= Canebrake, California =

Unincorporated community in California, United States

Canebrake
- Unincorporated community
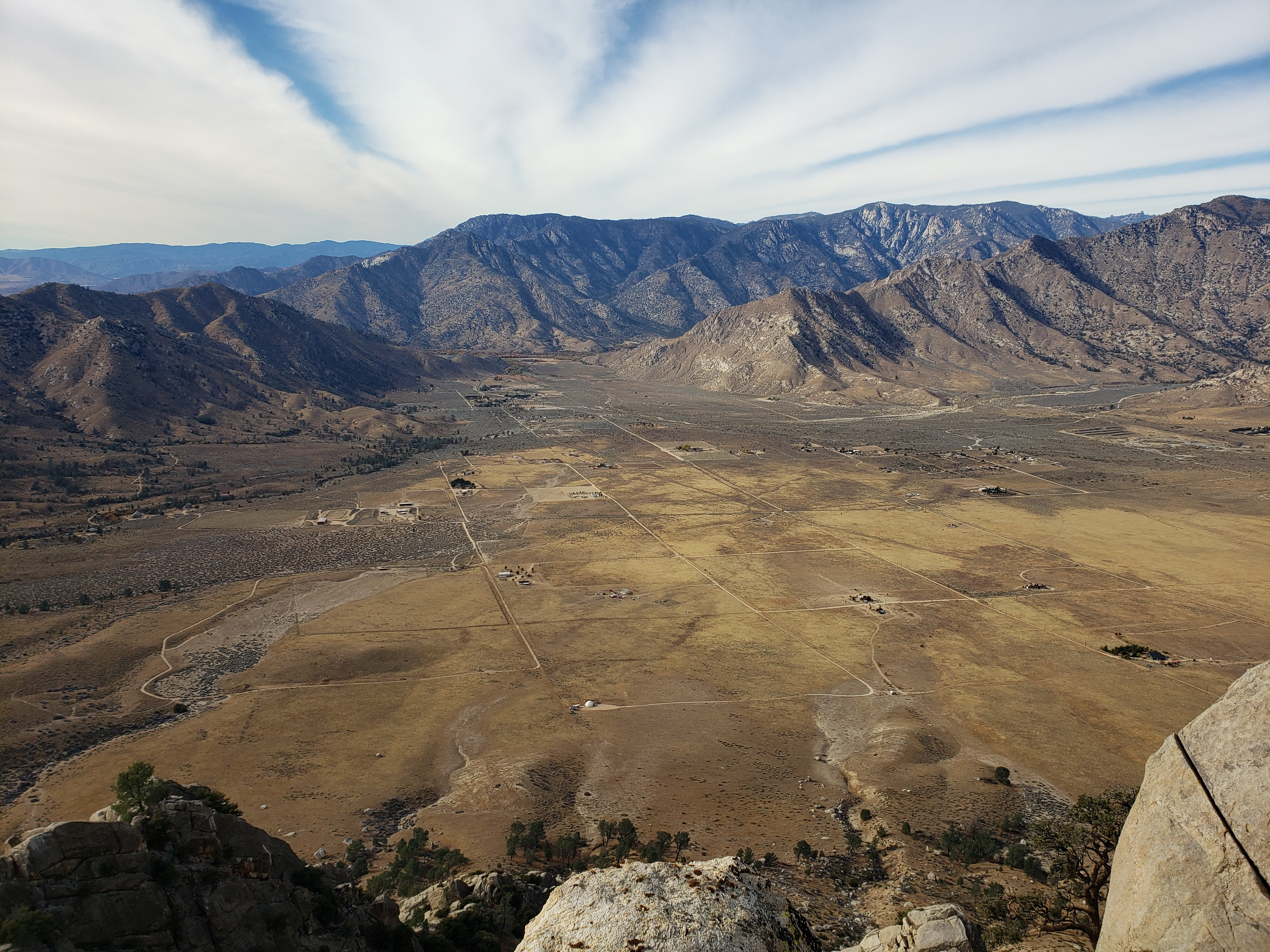
- Overview of Canebrake, nestled in the Kern River Valley as seen facing northwest from near Pinyon Peak

- Location in California Canebrake (the United States)
- Coordinates: 35°43′42″N 118°08′18″W
- Country: United States
- State: California
- County: Kern
- Elevation: 3,031 ft (924 m)

Canebrake is an unincorporated community in Kern County, California, United States. It is located along California State Route 178 in the South Fork Valley, 5.3 miles (9 km) east-northeast of Onyx at an elevation of 3,031 feet (924 m).

Canebrake Creek, which State Route 178 follows down to Canebrake from the Walker Pass, was named by Robert S. Williamson in the fall of 1853 after he observed Indians there collecting the sugary reeds from a canebrake, or bulrush patch. The creek is a major tributary of the South Fork Kern River, which it flows into at Bloomfield Ranch, part of the Canebrake Ecological Reserve.

The original town site was located about three miles further east on Isabella-Walker Pass Road. The area was the site of a speakeasy and alcohol still during Prohibition, run by a local bootlegger named Victor Hugo. The Chimney Peak Back Country Byway splits off from Route 178 in Canebrake, leading to the Chimney Peak Wilderness and connecting to some of the most rugged and remote areas of the Southern Sierra Nevada.

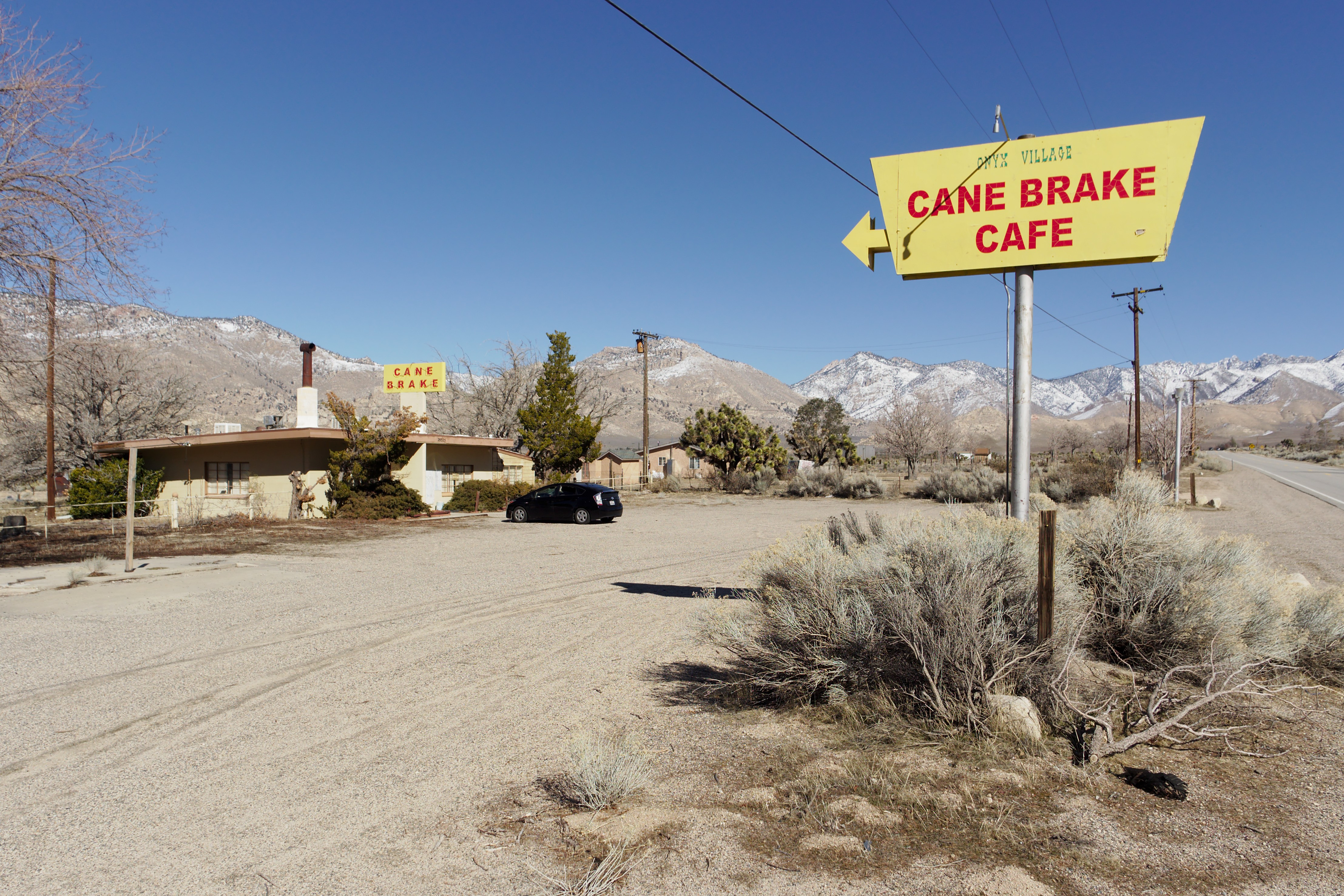
Canebrake Cafe, possibly the only commercial establishment in Canebrake
