= South Fork Kern River =

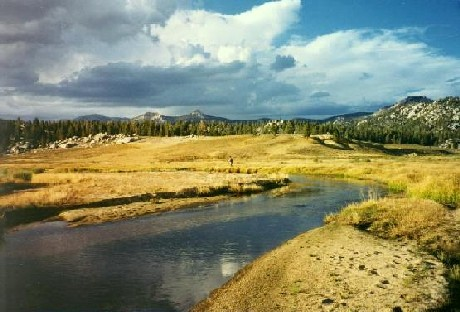
- Headwaters of the South Fork Kern River in Tulare County

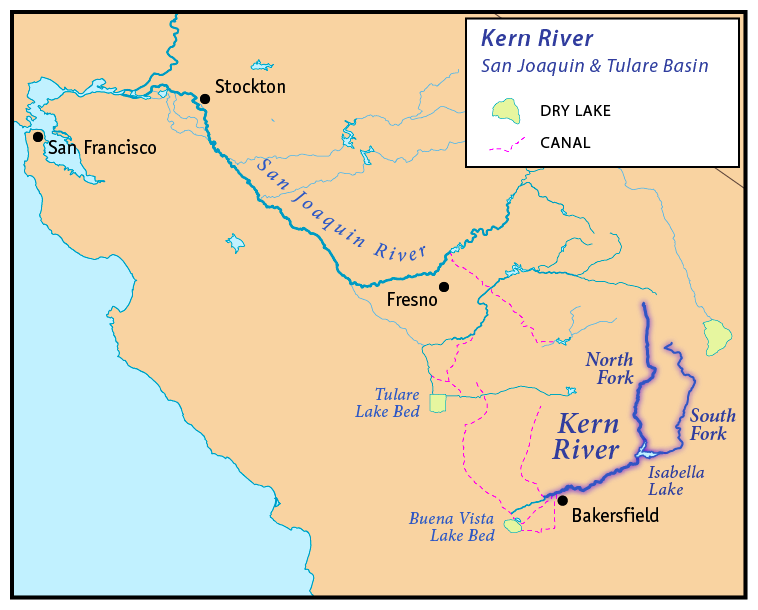
- Map showing the Kern River and the South Fork Kern River (to the east of the main stem)

Location
- Country: United States
- State: California
- Region: Inyo County, Tulare County, Kern County
- Cities: Onyx, Weldon

Physical characteristics
- Source: Southwest side of unnamed peak
  - location: near Horseshoe Meadow, Inyo National Forest, Tulare County
  - coordinates: 36°25′55″N 118°12′48″W
  - elevation: 10,850 ft (3,310 m)
- Mouth: Lake Isabella
  - location: Mountain Mesa, Kern County
  - coordinates: 35°39′34″N 118°27′51″W
  - elevation: 2,490 ft (760 m)
- Length: 95 mi (153 km), North-south
- Basin size: 982 sq mi (2,540 km^{2})
- Discharge
  - location: Isabella, California
  - average: 105 cu ft/s (3.0 m^{3}/s)
  - minimum: 4 cu ft/s (0.11 m^{3}/s)
  - maximum: 4,100 cu ft/s (120 m^{3}/s)

Basin features
- River system: Kern River watershed
- Tributaries
  - left: Canebrake Creek
  - right: Trout Creek (Kern River)

National Wild and Scenic River
- Designated: November 24, 1987

The South Fork Kern River is a tributary of the Kern River in the Sierra Nevada of the U.S. state of California. It is one of the southernmost rivers on the western slope of the mountains, and drains a high, relatively dry plateau country of 982 square miles (2,540 km^{2}) along the Sierra Crest. The upper South Fork flows through a series of rugged canyons, but it also drains a flat, marshy valley before joining the Kern River at Lake Isabella.

== Course ==
It rises in the Inyo National Forest on the Tulare side of the Inyo County-Tulare County line, in a small meadow on the Sierra Crest near the Pacific Crest Trail. The river flows south through meadows and broad valleys, drawing very close to Golden Trout Creek, a tributary of the Kern River to the west. Much of the river's course south is just to the west of Owens Valley, which lies to the east at the base of the Sierra.

The river then enters the Sequoia National Forest and receives Trout Creek from the right. Entering a gorge, the river courses through a 2,000-foot (610 m)-deep canyon before coming out of the mountains near Onyx. There it receives Canebrake Creek and turns southwest. The South Fork Kern then passes Weldon and the Kern River Preserve. As it nears Lake Isabella its fast waters slow and spread into extensive marshes. The river enters the reservoir at the end of a small delta. Its original confluence with the Kern is submerged under the lake, which is formed by Isabella Dam.

== History ==
The valley of the lower South Fork Kern River was once inhabited by the Tübatulabal and Kawaiisu tribes. Humans have lived along the river for approximately 3,000 years. In 1834, Joseph R. Walker and his company of explorers surveyed along the river trying to find a low pass over the Sierra Nevada mountains. During their journey, they discovered Walker Pass, a mile above sea level, which lies at the headwaters of Canebrake Creek, a major tributary of the South Fork. Walker returned in 1843, leading an early party of emigrants over the Sierra by way of the pass. Gold strikes brought miners to the area in the 1850s and 1860s, and the first permanent settlements along the river were built in 1859. Conflicts ensued between the newcomers and the native inhabitants, and a U.S. Army outfit, Camp Leonard, was established on the river to provide military control over the area.

== River modifications ==
Most of the river is free-flowing – with no dams and few diversions – with one exception. In 1953, the Isabella Dam was built on the Kern River near Bodfish by the U.S. Army Corps of Engineers, flooding the lower parts of the North Fork Kern (the main stem above Isabella) and the South Fork Kern under Isabella Lake to provide flood control and hydroelectric power. However, problems have developed with the dam's structure, creating a high risk of failure. A collapse of the dam, which could be caused by a quake on the Kern Canyon fault that lies directly under the structure, could inundate the city of Bakersfield within hours.

In addition, the lower Kern, South Fork Kern and Canebrake Creek valleys provide an important transportation route. California State Route 178 runs through them, linking Bakersfield and Inyokern, which lie on opposite sides of the Sierra, via Walker Pass. SR178 is one of the few routes that cross this section of the mountain range. The road was first built in the 1890s. It was added to the California state highway system in 1919, and was paved in 1940.

== See also ==
- Golden Trout Wilderness
- Kings Canyon National Park
- Sequoia National Park
- Tulare Lake
- List of rivers of California
