= Tübatulabal =

Ethnic group in the Sierra Nevada range of California

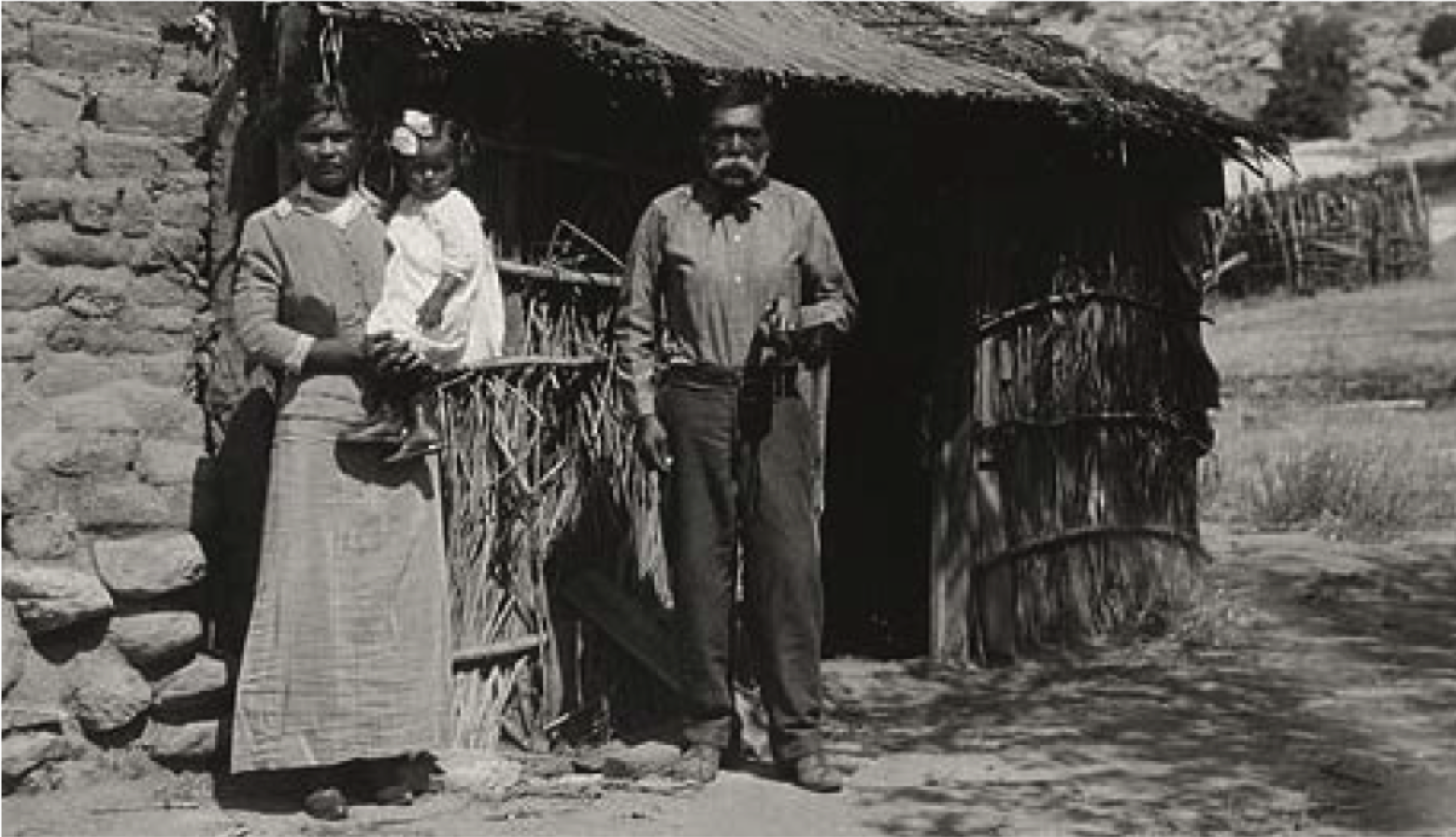
- Tübatulabal family in 1916

Total population
- 900

Regions with significant populations
- United States (California)

Languages
- English, formerly Tübatulabal

Religion
- Traditional tribal religion, Christianity

Related ethnic groups
- Kawaiisu people

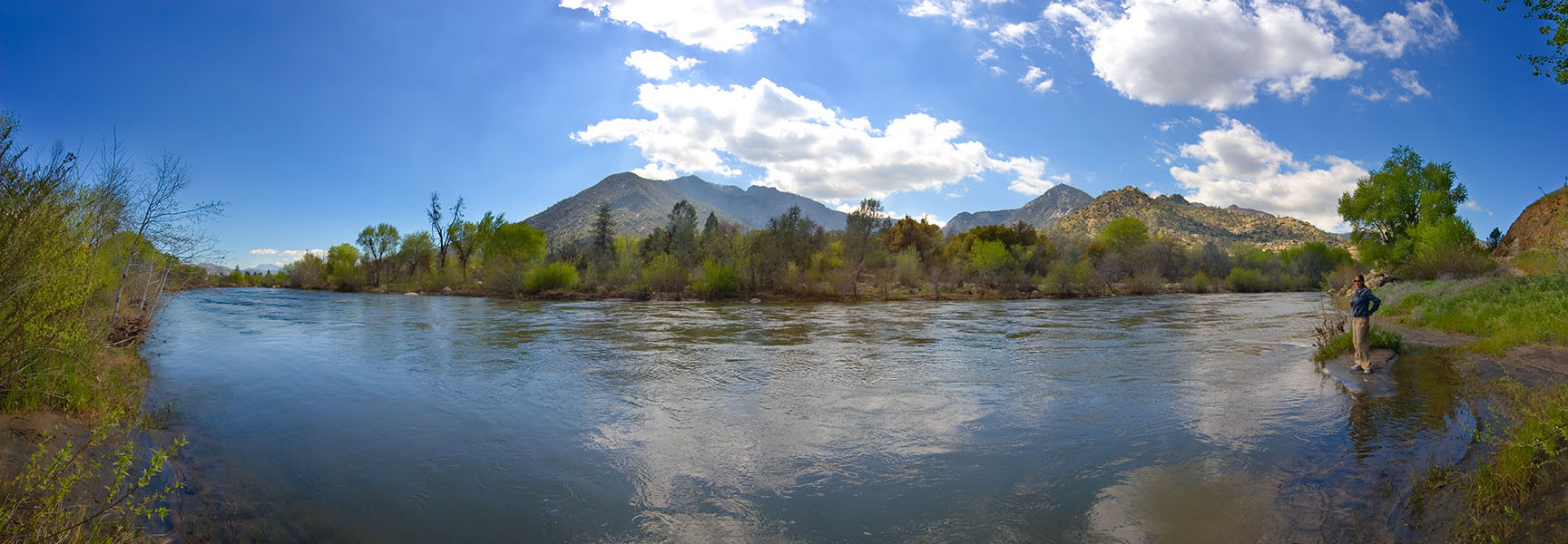
Upper fork of Kern River

The Tübatulabal are an indigenous people of Kern River Valley in the Sierra Nevada range of California, including part of the area that makes up Sequoia National Park in the modern day. They may have been the first people to make this area their permanent home. Today many of them are enrolled in the Tule River Indian Tribe. They are descendants of the people of the Uto-Aztecan language group, separating from Shoshone people about 3000 years ago.

== Territory ==
The Tübatulabal's traditional homelands extended over 1,300 square miles (3,400 km^{2}) including the Kern and South Fork Kern Rivers drainages (located in the Kern Valley area of California) extending from very high mountainous terrain in the north to about 41 miles (66 km) below the junction of the two rivers in the south. The high mountains in the north (2,500–14,500 feet [760–4,420 m]) are interspersed with lakes and meadows. The southern area (2,500–3,000 feet [760–910 m]) has three connected valleys: Kern Valley, South Fork Kern Valley, and Hot Springs Valley, where summers are hot and winters cold and rainy. The valleys are grasslands and chaparral with cacti, scrub oaks, willows, elderberry, and cottonwoods as primary vegetation with some joshua trees, junipers, piñons, oaks, and sugar pines.

== Name ==
The valley of the Kern River has been the home of three distinct bands which are collectively named Tübatulabal. The name Tübatulabal (“a people that go to the forest to gather tubat (piñon nuts)”) loosely translates as "pine-nut eaters." The name is paralleled by one name used by the neighboring Yokuts, Wateknasi, which is likewise based on the Yokuts word watak 'pine-nut'. The Yokuts also called the Tübatulabals Pitanisha, which comes from the place-name of a location where the Kern River forks. The name for the north fork of the river has the Indian name of, Palegewanap or "place of the big river." The south fork of the river conversely was given the name of Kutchibichwanap Palap, or "place of the little river."

== Bands ==
The three bands that comprise the Tübatulabal tribe are (from west to east):

- Bankalachi, Pong-ah-lache or Toloim / Tulamni (lived in the Greenhorn Mountains and from Poso Creek and Poso Flats around Glennville, California, north along Cedar Creek, White River to Deer Creek, sometimes they were farther up along the South Fork Tule River, territory of the Tule River Yokuts, with the Foothill Yokuts (Tule River and Poso Creek Yokuts) they practiced extensive exogamy marriages, so that they are described as an intermediate group)
  - Bankalachi or Bokninuwiad (northern group, oft considered Foothill Yokuts)
  - Kumachisi (southern group, oft considered Foothill Yokuts)
  - Toloim or Tulamni (southwestern group, oft identified with the Tulamni Band of Buena Vista Yokuts)
- Pahkanapil, Bahkanapil, Tubatulabal proper (from Mount Whitney south along the South Fork Kern River to Lake Isabella - around Onyx, California and Weldon, California - to Ridgecrest, California near Walker Pass)
- Palagewan (Little Kern River, North Fork Kern River, south through Kern River Canyon into Hot Springs Valley (Lake Isabella) and the Kern River down to Bakersfield, California)

== Culture ==
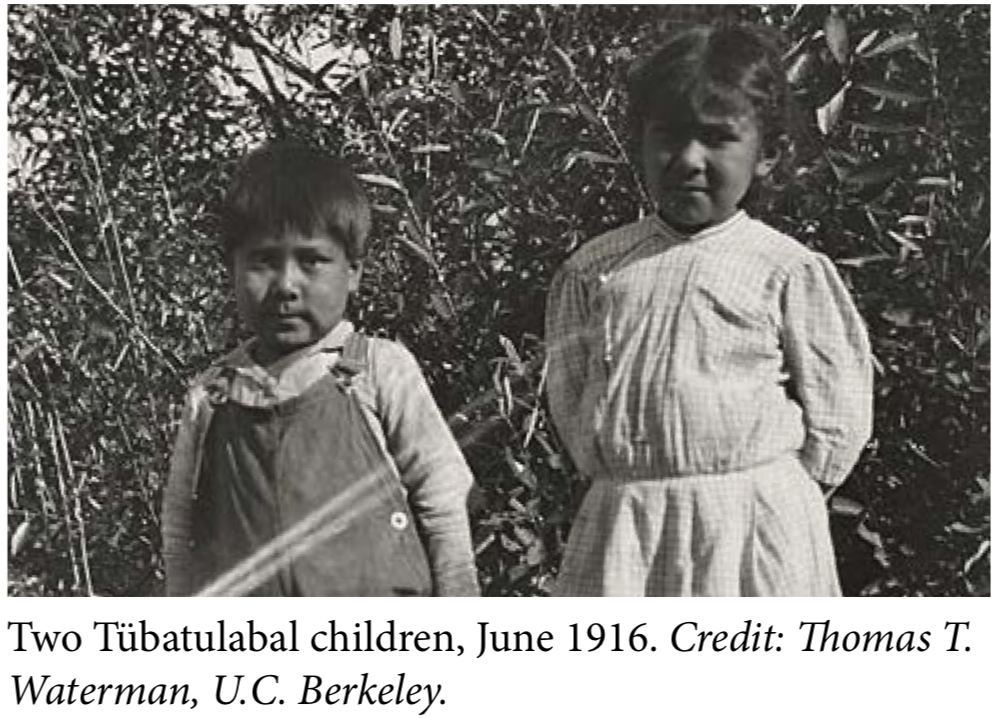
Two Tubatulabal children in 1916

Tübatulabal traditional culture was similar to that of the Yokuts, who occupied most of the southern half of the California's Central Valley. Acorns, piñon nuts, and game animals were key elements in Tubatulabal subsistence. Located in the Kern Valley, the tribe had contact with the Poso Creek Yokuts to the southwest and the Tule-Kaweah Yokuts west, as well as to Western and Southern Numic speaking groups to the north and east (Western and Eastern Mono, and Timbisha (Panamint)). On their southern border were living the Kawaiisu, and further south the Tübatulabal had ties with Kitanemuk, Serrano, and Tataviam (Alliklik) peoples who spoke the Takic branch of Uto-Aztecan. The Tübatulabal were significant participants and go-betweens in the trade networks connecting the Great Basin, the southern deserts, the Central Valley, and the coastal groups.

Compared to other tribes in the Sierra Nevada, Tübatulabal had higher status and privilege. Though the tribe followed traditional patriarchy, women had an equal voice in decisions. Marriage had to be mutually consensual, and women could practice birth control.

According to the tribe's oral history, the deep crags, crevices, and crooks of the canyon moving upward (east from the mouth of the Kern Canyon) to the upper reaches of the Kern River were "created by hawk and duck as they bounced back and forth, to and from along the canyon walls as they raced up the river."

The Tübatulabal are well known for their red pottery and coiled baskets. Today, many of their baskets are housed at the National Smithsonian Anthropological Archives, University of California Berkeley, California State Parks Archives, and many other museums and universities. Louisa Francisco, a Bankalachi was well known for her wonderful baskets. Some Tübatulabal families in Kern Valley are related to Francisco. Many of their ancestors married into the Tule River Tribe, Tachi Yokuts, and Tejon Indian Tribe. Tribal families shared in their basket making designs, materials, and weaving techniques. Louisa had a brother named Peter, both came from Poso Flat—a Bankalachi (Toloim) Village. Louisa was born 1865 at Poso Flat (Kern County) and died at age 95 in 1954. She was living on the Tule River Indian Reservation just prior to her death.

Estefana Miranda, a Pakanapul, lived in Weldon, California (born in 1895 and died in 1957) on the Miranda Allotment. Estefana was the daughter of Steban Miranda, the last Tübatulabal chief. Estefana knew how to harvest native tobacco, acorns, salt grass, and other native foods of the South Fork of Kern Valley and Kelso Valley areas. She knew how to make "flat round" basket used for both sifting and ceremonies. Her baskets were also used to process piñon nuts picked from Walker Pass, Kennedy Meadows, and Greenhorn Mountain areas. "Estefana was also an excellent horseman—she could make her horses jump side to side and jump over large dirt ditches."

== Language ==
Their ancestral language, Tübatulabal belongs to the Uto-Aztecan language family. In the current state of the linguistics of the Uto-Aztecan family, it is classified as a branch unto itself.

Tübatulabal is a Uto-Aztecan language that, although definitely part of the Uto-Aztecan stock, is not closely related to other languages in that group. Unlike the related languages, the Tübatulabal most often ended in consonant sounds. They used individual names and suffixes to denote place in the family and relation to the dead.

Tübatulabal have two dialects "paka'anil" and "bankalachi". Today, in Mountain Mesa, California, the Tübatulabal tribe has a Pakanapul Language Program that teaches the "paka'anil" dialect. The last fluent "paka'anil" dialect speaker was James Andreas, who died in 2009. He lived on the Miranda Allotment, located in Weldon, California. James Andreas spent his last 10 years teaching the Pakanapul Language Team the "paka'anil" dialect. The "bankalachi" dialect is similar to the "paka'anil", however, there is little known about the "bankalachi" dialect.

== Historical trauma ==
The Tubatulabal people of the Kern river valley have survived historical trauma. Of the three bands of the Tubatulabal, the Pahkanapul were the only ones to survive the Keyesville massacre of 1863, where 35 Tübatulabal and Mono people were killed by United States Army troops and American settlers led by Captain Moses A. McLaughlin. The Tubatulabal tribe was almost wiped out because most were adult men who died in the massacre. "They never seemed to blame the local whites or act vengeful towards those who had made such a change in their lives." In an interview with one of the tribe members about the massacre conducted for a study stated " That morning the soldiers killed our people it caused a lot of heartache to our people physically, emotionally, and mentally. They took away all our people who tell stories, who could read the stars at night, who could farm. They took away all our old traditions, our songs, our language, and our pride. It affected us a lot. Even to this day it affects us."

== Population ==
Estimates for the precontact populations of most native groups in California have varied substantially. By two estimates, the Tübatulabal were a small to very small nation. Alfred L. Kroeber (1925:883) put the 1770 population of the Tübatulabal as 1,000. Erminie W. Voegelin considered Kroeber's estimate too high (Voegelin 1938:39). For the time of initial European-American settlement, around 1850, she estimated 200–300.

Kroeber in 1910 reported the population of the Tübatulabal as 150. Yamamoto in 2000 estimated the population at 900.

== Contemporary tribe ==
Today, a Tübatulabal tribe is seeking federal recognition. They have an office located in Mountain Mesa, California, and include descendants of several tribal families who were awarded allotment lands under the US Dawes Allotment Act 1887. Tribal membership is at 287 members, however, a new open enrollment process has been established as of October 2012. The tribe estimates about 400–600 total members.

== See also ==
- Tubatulabal traditional narratives
