= Kern River Preserve =

Nature reserve in California, United States

Audubon Kern River Preserve
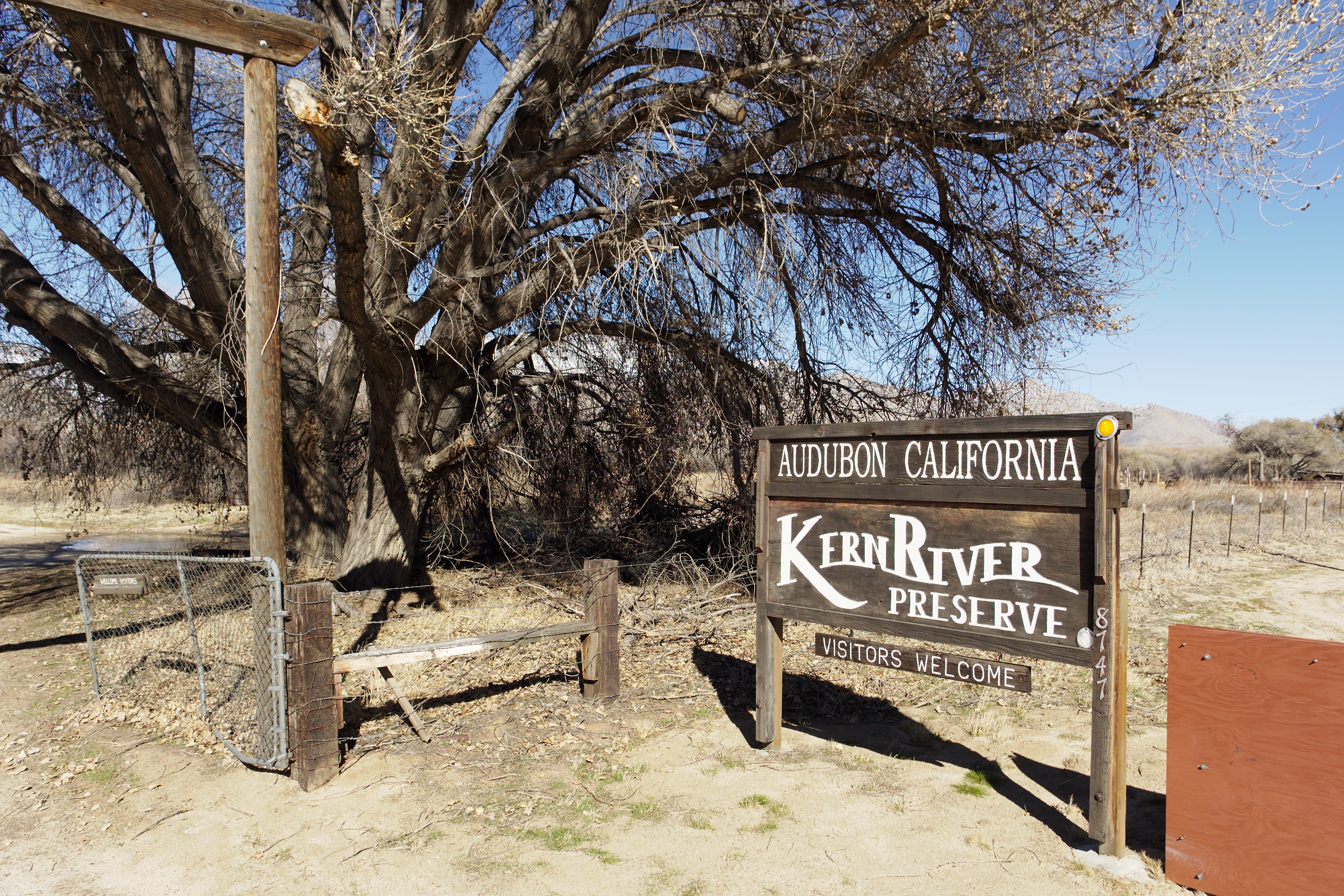
- Entrance from SR 178

- Location within California
- Location: Weldon, California, State Route 178 northeastern Kern County
- Nearest city: Bakersfield, California
- Coordinates: 35°40′10″N 118°18′58″W
- Area: 2,987 acres (12.09 km^{2})
- Established: 1979
- Governing body: National Audubon Society

The Audubon Kern River Preserve is a riparian nature reserve owned by the National Audubon Society in the US state of California, near Weldon in Kern County.

The preserve is located in one of the largest contiguous riparian forests remaining in the state. The 3,000-acre (12 km^{2}) preserve provides habitat for rare and Audubon's endangered birds, one of which is the federally listed endangered southwestern willow flycatcher, a subspecies of the willow flycatcher. The preserve is located within a designated Globally Important Bird Area, a program of the National Audubon Society with its partner BirdLife International to identify and protect critical avian habitats.

The South Fork Kern River, designated a national Wild and Scenic River since 1987. flows down the South Fork Valley, through the Kern River Preserve and then into Lake Isabella. The South Fork is the source for irrigation water for agriculture and the rare riparian forests of the valley. The river's upper reaches have populations of golden trout, California's state fish. The golden trout is being reviewed by United States Fish and Wildlife Service for listing under the Endangered Species Act.

Scientific research studies are conducted at the Kern River Preserve, including the Grinnell Resurvey Project, a 2008-09 resurvey by University of California, Berkeley students of zoologist Joseph Grinnell's 1914 landmark survey of California species.

The preserve features a visitor center, a self-guided nature trail, monthly nature events, monthly volunteer work days and a variety of festivals during the year.

== History ==
The Preserve is located on the former cattle ranch of Andrew Brown, which dates to the 1860s. The ranch was bought by The Nature Conservancy in 1979 and the deed transferred to National Audubon Society in 1998.

=== Pioneer Andrew Brown ===
Andrew Brown was born in Ireland in 1829, arrived in California in 1852, and eventually settled in Kern County. He operated a general store in Kernville, and expanded into Weldon township with the purchase of a second store and a ranch. Brown raised cattle, sheep, hogs and wheat. He built a flour mill in Weldon and later a sawmill near what is now Wofford Heights. Business success enabled Brown to purchase and trade for other ranch and farm land, and he incorporated all his interests into the A. Brown Company in 1901. Brown was company president until his death in 1909. The Brown family continued operations until the 1970s. when the heirs sold the Brown Ranch to the Kern County Land and Cattle Company.

Development of the property was a possibility, however, The Nature Conservancy moved quickly to purchase 1,600 acres (6.5 km^{2}) of the ranch. The purchase was accomplished in 1979 with funds from donors, two of which were Getty Oil Company and the W. M. Keck Foundation.

=== Expansion of the preserve ===
The Nature Conservancy acquired adjacent acreage through a program of land trades which swapped pasture land parcels for riparian forest parcels with nearby Sprague Ranch and the Prince Ranch in 1980. The preserve now bordered the Army Corps of Engineers' (now Sequoia National Forest) South Fork Wildlife Area on the west and the eastern end of Lake Isabella where the South Fork Kern River enters the reservoir. In 1981, a fence was constructed to protect the streamside vegetation from grazing cattle.

On March 31, 2005, Audubon California chapter and California Department of Fish and Game bought 4,358 acres (17.64 km^{2}) of the Sprague Ranch. The purchase was in part to mitigate for the flooding of the South Fork Wildlife Area from Lake Isabella during high water years and resulting loss of willow flycatcher habitat. A total of 1,640 acres (6.6 km^{2}) was added to the preserve, the remaining 2,718 acres (11.00 km^{2}) of Sprague Ranch went to California Department of Fish and Game. Funding was provided by US Army Corps of Engineers; California Wildlife Conservation Board; and the National Audubon Society from a grant from the Packard Foundation's Conserving California's Landscape Initiative.

On January 31, 2006, the purchase of 105 acres (0.42 km^{2}) of the Alexander Ranch that flanks the South Fork Kern River was completed with funds from the Resources Legacy Foundation. The riverfront property has nesting sites of vermilion flycatchers, yellow warblers, Bullock's orioles and southwestern willow flycatcher. The land is in good condition, with ponds of duckweed and other wetland plants that harbor several pond turtles.

There were two land acquisitions in 2009: On August 28, the 26-acre (110,000 m^{2}) Vig property was purchased by Audubon, and November 20, the 80-acre (320,000 m^{2}) Pond Ranch sale closed a gap between Fay Ranch Road and Sierra Way Road. The Pond Ranch purchase added one-quarter mile of the South Fork Kern River frontage to the preserve

=== Cattle and conservation ===
In addition to real estate purchases, the Audubon California organization continues to work with private land owners in the South Fork Valley on conservation issues. Bruce Hafenfeld, of the California Cattlemen's Association, operates a family ranch raising commercial calves and cows on both private property and public lands on a federal grazing allotment. Hafenfeld has entered into a perpetual conservation easement with the Natural Resources Conservation Service (formerly Soil Conservation Service) to ensure the property is maintained as a working ranch. "We developed a management plan for 1.3 acres along the Kern River Preserve, went after a wetland reserve grant, and developed habitat that increased opportunities for species to come onto my land. We were trying to show that we were not a liability, but an asset." Hafenfeld said, speaking at the 2007 Conference of the Riparian Habitat Joint Venture. The Riparian Habitat Joint Venture is a cooperative conservation agreement between federal, state and private entities modeled after the joint venture projects of the North American Waterfowl Management Plan. It was started in 1994 by Partners in flight.

It took eight years, working with multiple agencies, to form the conservation easement for the Hafenfeld Ranch.

== Flora and fauna ==
=== South Fork Kern River and Valley ===
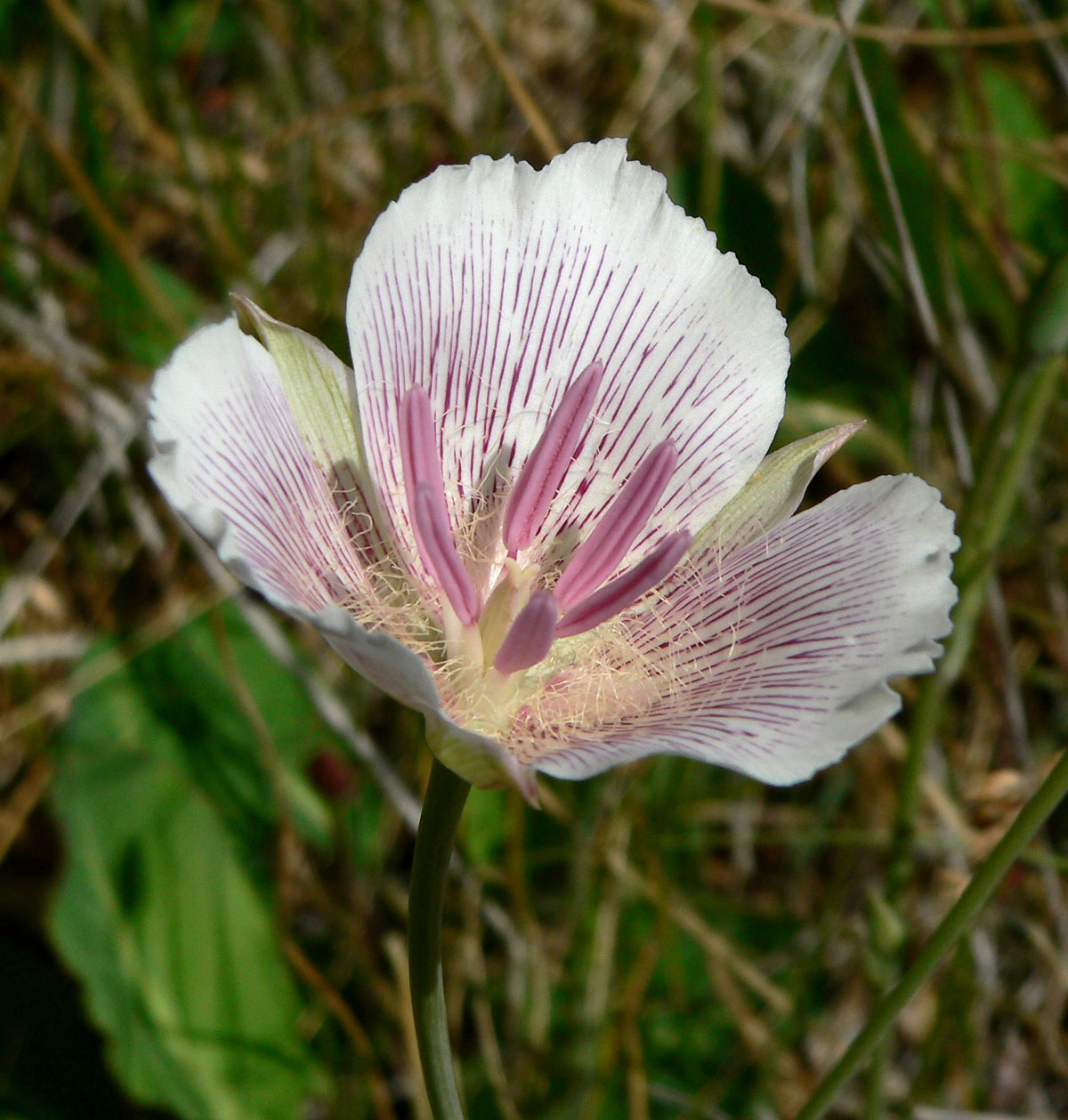
Alkali mariposa lily.

The South Fork Kern River is the heart of the preserve and the South Fork Valley. The river begins at elevation 10,400 feet (3,200 m) in the Inyo National Forest at Mulkey Meadows, named after Cyrus Mulkey, sheriff of Inyo County, California from 1871 to 1874. The river flows down the South Fork Valley, through the Audubon Kern River Preserve to Lake Isabella at 2,605 feet (794 m) elevation. The South Fork Valley, only a few miles wide and 15 miles (24 km) in length, is at the southern end of the Sierra Nevada Mountains in northeastern Kern County. Although the valley was the first area settled in the county, it contains the largest contiguous riparian forest still remaining in the state. There are several types of riparian forest, the South Fork Valley has the Great Valley Cottonwood Forest, distinguished by a majority of Fremont cottonwood and willow tree species. The understory is dense with wild rose and shade-tolerant Oregon ash. The soils are fine-grained alluvial with annual river flooding that maintains fertility.

The University of California, Santa Barbara's Biogeography Lab report describes the distribution of this type of riparian forest as "Formerly extensive along the major low-gradient (depositional) streams throughout the Great Valley, but [are] now reduced to scattered, isolated remnants or young stands because of flood control, water diversion, agricultural development, and urban expansion..."

Rare wildflowers include the alkali mariposa lily. Listed by California Native Plant Society as "rare, threatened or endangered in California and elsewhere", it has been observed near the South Fork Kern River, as well as the surrounding counties and in the state of Nevada. It is a perennial bulb that blooms in April and May, and is threatened by grazing, trampling, road construction, urbanization and horticultural collecting. Water diversions can also impact this primarily wetland species.

=== Bird species ===
The streamside habitat provides nesting sites for riparian-dependent bird species: The federally threatened western yellow-billed cuckoo, endangered in California; the brown-crested flycatcher, a cavity-nester; the yellow warbler, the yellow-breasted chat, and the southwestern willow flycatcher.

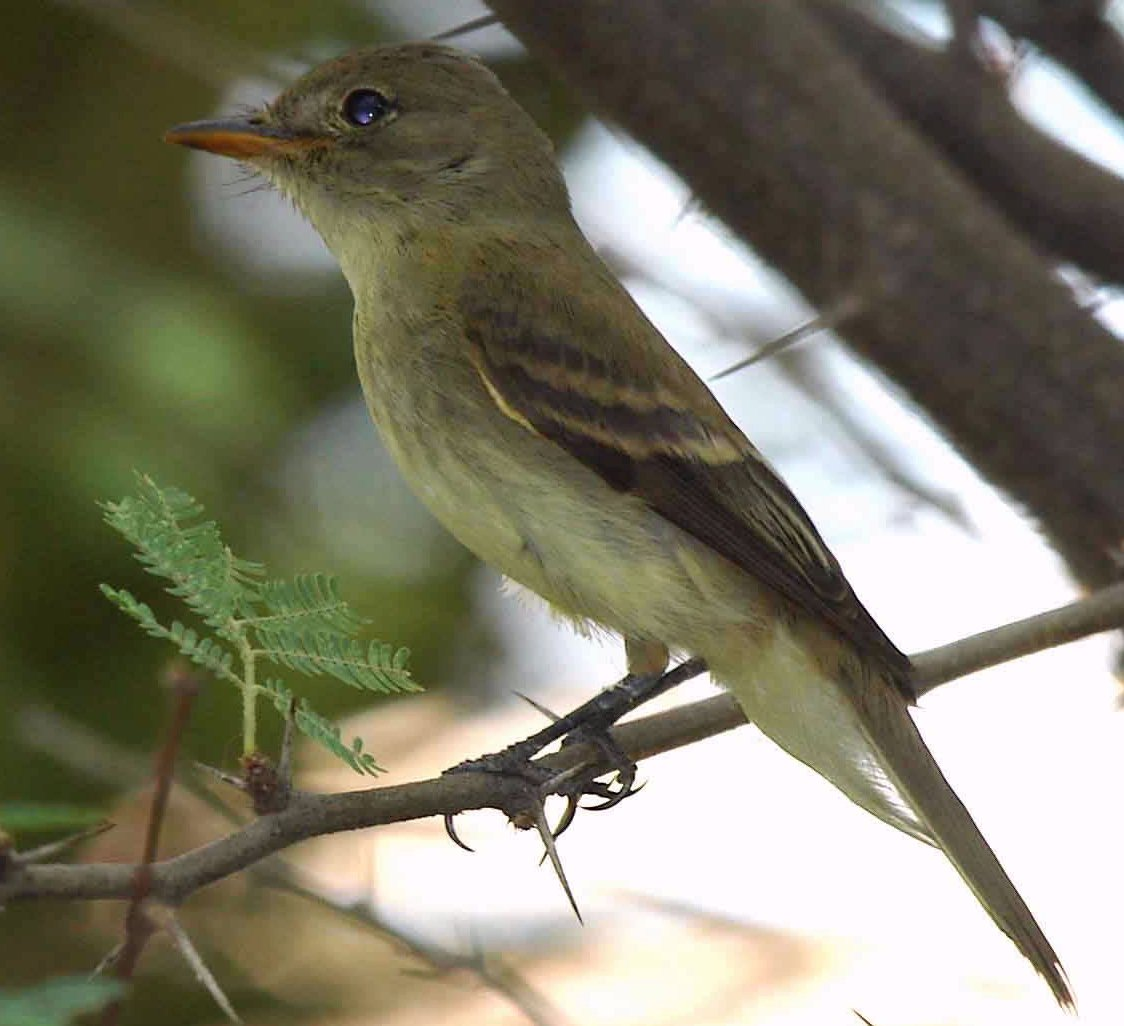
Southwestern willow flycatcher USFWS photo.

The federally listed endangered southwestern willow flycatcher has small populations in the preserve and is closely monitored by Audubon volunteers and staff. The US Fish and Wildlife Service designated critical habitat for the southwestern willow flycatcher which includes 9.6 miles (15.4 km) of the South Fork Kern River and excludes Hafenfeld Ranch which has the conservation easement in place.

Another notable bird is the summer tanager. The summer tanager breeds in lowlands along streams and is known as a bee and wasp specialist. The summer tanager will remove the bee's stinger before ingesting by rubbing the bee on a branch. The least Bell's vireo is a species that will hopefully reestablish nesting in the South Fork Kern River Valley. It is one of four subspecies of Bell's vireo, which disappeared from California's Central Valley by the 1960s, and has been federally listed as endangered since 1986. The US Fish and Wildlife Service's 5-year review of least Bell's vireo, dated September 2006, attributes the primary cause of population declines to loss of riparian habitat in California. Another threat listed by the review is from the brown-headed cowbird which lays its eggs in other birds' nests, called brood parasiteism. The Southern Sierra Research Station, which conducts research on the Kern River Preserve, has a cowbird eradication program which has reduced the rate of parasitism to 20 percent from 60 to 70 percent (percentage of willow flycatcher nests studied by Southern Sierra Research Station staff).

=== Mammals, amphibians, reptiles and insects ===
Common mammals include mule deer, coyote, dusky-footed woodrat, long-tailed weasel, California ground squirrel, American black bear, and bobcat. Uncommon species include mountain lion and an introduced species of beaver. There are 50 species of mammals found on the Kern River Preserve.

There are three species of amphibians and 24 species of reptiles, including the common garter snake, California kingsnake, several lizard species and the California toad. The only venomous snake at the preserve is the Northern Pacific rattlesnake. Also found at the preserve is the Pacific pond turtle, a species of concern in California and listed as endangered in Washington state.

The South Fork Valley is unique in California, as three of the ten floristic provinces in the nation meet and overlap here. The floristic provinces are: Great Basin Desert, Mojave Desert, and Californian Province (in which one finds numerous ecotypes: grassland, riparian forest, oak woodland, interior chaparral, mixed conifer, sequoia, red fir, subalpine.) The resulting diversity is evident in the numbers of species: There are 31 species dragonfly, of and 53 species of butterfly, including the alkali skipper (grass skipper) and the rare San Emigdio blue butterfly.
The San Emigdio blue butterfly is a species of concern due to its limited local range consisting of Southern California from Inyo County south through the Mojave Desert, San Joaquin Valley, Bouquet and Mint canyons of Los Angeles County.

== Scientific research ==
=== Grinnell Resurvey Project ===
Joseph Grinnell was one of the founding directors of the Museum of Vertebrate Zoology at the University of California, Berkeley from 1908 until his death in 1939. Grinnell undertook a biological survey project in 1908, which lasted 30 years and covered more than 700 locations in the state of California. The resulting database has more than 20,000 specimens, 13,000 pages of field notes, and 2,000 photographs. The Grinnell Survey database is one of the most comprehensive collections of its kind in the world.

A resurvey of Grinnell's original route was begun by the museum to research, document and model changes in the distribution and habits of animal species in the timespan between the early 1900s and the current century. The Kern River Valley area, called the Whitney transect, was studied in June and September 2008 and in May 2009 by the resurvey teams. The original Grinnell 1911-1914 field notes are online and searchable. (See External links section.) Parts of the resurvey of California are completed, including Yosemite National Park, and show changing trends in wildlife territory and range; some expanding, some contracting and some species moving to higher elevations.

=== Other research ===
A subspecies of the Pacific (western) pond turtle is the southern Pacific pond turtle (Actinemys marmorata pallida). A project for headstarting pond turtle hatchlings on the preserve began in 2006 with grants from the Fish and Wildlife Foundation. As of July 2010, 17 juvenile turtles were released from captivity. This process is known as headstarting, where hatchlings are raised in captivity until they are large enough to avoid predators and then released to the wild.

The Southern Sierra Research Station, a non-profit organization, conducts research at the preserve on the western yellow-billed cuckoo and southwestern willow flycatcher.

Biologist Donald Mitchell from the University of Minnesota studied migration of hummingbirds at the preserve. Mitchell is a federally permitted hummingbird bander and has served as Vice President of the Minnesota Ornithologists' Union.

== Public access and education ==
Audubon's Kern River Preserve hosts four festivals annually, monthly nature education programs, and monthly volunteer days. The preserve is open sunrise to sunset all year, including holidays.

- In April is the Kern River Valley Bioregions Festival, and has guided hikes, workshops, crafts vendors, musical entertainment and exhibits.
- Held in August is the Kern Valley Hummingbird Celebration, and includes nature walks, workshops on identification of hummingbirds, information on gardening for hummingbirds, and musical entertainment.
- In September the Kern Valley Autumn Nature & Vulture Festival is held, and begins with a "Turkey Vulture Lift Off" and includes turkey vulture interpretation during the birds departure from their overnight roost between 8:30 and 10 a.m. The festival includes free bird walks, informational booths, interactive exhibits and displays featuring live reptiles, plants and wildlife along with musical entertainment. Activities are scheduled throughout the day.
- Monthly Nature Exploration events are held on the first Saturday of the month from 9 a.m. to 11 a.m. Topics vary each month with experts from fields across the spectrum of outdoor adventures.
- Monthly volunteer workdays are held on the third Saturday of the month from 8 a.m. to noon (with a summer hiatus in June, July and August). Projects vary each month depending on season. Rewarding projects have included: habitat restoration (riparian, upland and marshland), fence removal, cleanups, participation in the KRP Valley Pride Day team, and trail maintenance.

== See also ==
- Canebrake Ecological Reserve
- Riparian zone restoration
- Stream restoration
- Wetland conservation

== Notes ==
=== General references ===
US Fish and Wildlife Service Endangered Species Program.

Dirkson, Diane and James, Recreational Lakes of California 12th ed. Recreation Sales Publishing 1999
