= South Lake, California =

South Lake, California may refer to:

- South Lake, Kern County, California
- South Lake, Tulare County, California
- South Lake Tahoe, California
