= Tubatulabal traditional narratives =

Tubatulabal traditional narratives include myths, legends, tales, and oral histories preserved by the Tubatulabal people of the Kern River basin of the southern Sierra Nevada in California.

Tubatulabal oral literature was most similar to that of the Great Basin, rather than central California. (See also Traditional narratives (Native California).)

== On-Line Examples of Tubatulabal Narratives ==
- Myths and Legends of California and the Old Southwest by Katharine Berry Judson (1912)

== Sources for Tubatulabal Narratives ==
- Judson, Katharine Berry. 1912. Myths and Legends of California and the Old Southwest. A. C. McClurg, Chicago. (Four "Pai Ute" narratives, pp. 48–49, 75–76, 106, 193.)
- Luthin, Herbert W. 2002. Surviving through the Days: A California Indian Reader. University of California Press, Berkeley. (A myth on "The Contest between Men and Women," slightly revised from Voegelin 1938, pp. 363–381.)
- Powers, Stephen. 1877. Tribes of California. Contributions to North American Ethnology, vol. 3. Government Printing Office, Washington, D.C. Reprinted with an introduction by Robert F. Heizer in 1976, University of California Press, Berkeley. (Several narratives, pp. 394–395.)
- Voegelin, Charles F. 1935. "Tübatulabal Texts". University of California Publications in American Archaeology and Ethnology 34:191-246. Berkeley. (Assorted types of narratives, including Earth Diver and Orpheus.)
- Voegelin, Erminie W. 1938. "Tübatulabal Ethnography". Archaeological Records 2:1-90. University of California Press, Berkeley. (One Tubatulabal myth, pp. 53–55.)
