= Canebrake Ecological Reserve =

Ecological reserve in Kern County, California

- IUCN category Ia (strict nature reserve)
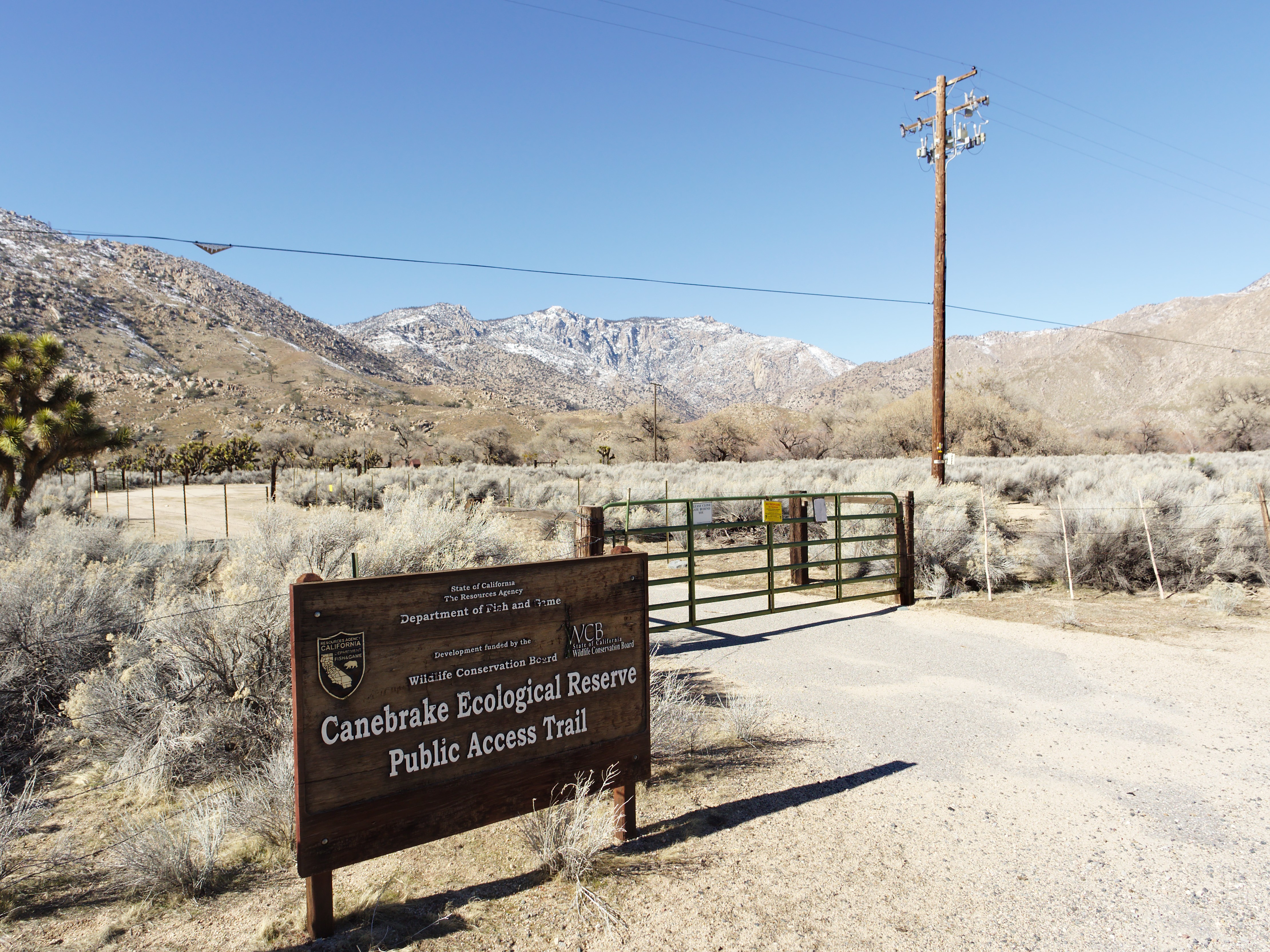
- Access gate along SR 178

- Location within California
- Location: Kern County, California
- Nearest city: Ridgecrest
- Coordinates: 35°43′40″N 118°10′26″W
- Area: 6,700 acres (27 km^{2})
- Established: 1996
- Governing body: California Department of Fish and Game

Canebrake Ecological Reserve is a 6,700-acre (27 km^{2}) nature reserve in the South Fork Valley of Kern County, 20 miles (32 km) east of Lake Isabella, California. It is located in the Southern Sierra Nevada region.

Historian Wallace M. Morgan, in History of Kern County, California, wrote that the South Fork Valley was the first area settled around 1846, and described the valley as "a fertile strip of bottomland that forms the most important of the mountain farming districts". The first acreage purchased for reserve was part of the 129-year-old Bloomfield Ranch.

== Description ==
The California Department of Fish and Game acquired the land in 1994 and by 1996, 1,300 acres (5.3 km^{2}) became the Canebrake reserve, named after Canebrake Creek, a tributary of South Fork Kern River. A 1.2-mile (1.9 km) nature trail crosses Canebrake Creek, is wheelchair accessible, and has views of cottonwood-willow forest with several willow species (Salix gooddingii, S . lasiandra, and S . laevigata) and Fremont cottonwood (Populus fremontii) that intergrade with a relict stand of Joshua trees (Yucca brevifolia).

The reserve was enlarged by land purchases in 2002 and 2005 through the state Wildlife Conservation Board. Although not contiguous, one segment is in Cap Canyon, the other in Scodie Canyon, the lands are important corridors for wildlife connecting the reserve to Sequoia National Forest. The 2005 purchase by the Wildlife Conservation Board (WCB) used Proposition 117 funds. Proposition 117, known as the California Wildlife Protection Act of 1990, created the Habitat Conservation Fund with an annual budget of $30 million, for various state agencies such as the WCB.

=== Bird species ===
Rare bird species in the area include the federally listed endangered southwestern willow flycatcher (Empidonax traillii extimus), state listed endangered western yellow-billed cuckoo (Coccyzus americanus occidentalis) and the tricolored blackbird (Agelaius tricolor), a species of concern. The South Fork Kern population of southwestern willow flycatcher is one of the largest in the US.

The Kern red-winged blackbird is on the state's species of concern list. . Part of the historic nesting area on the South Fork Kern River was lost from land clearing. In 1954, the filling of Lake Isabella reservoir inundated and destroyed several miles of riparian and wetland nesting areas for the Kern red-winged blackbird. The largest breeding population still occurs in the South Fork Valley and may number as many as 500 individuals. The current nesting area is from Canebrake Ecological Reserve to the area around the town of Lake Isabella.

== Habitat restoration ==
Habitat restoration includes planting of Fremont cottonwood, red willow, Oregon ash, white alder, hoary nettle and California black walnut. One goal of the restoration is to increase suitable riparian areas for the Kern red-winged blackbird and southwestern willow flycatcher, both of which require dense cottonwood-willow forest.

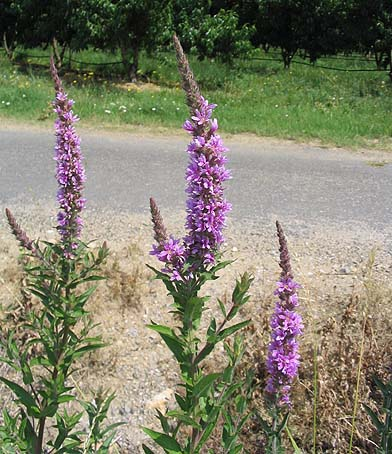
Invasive species: Purple-loosestrife (Lythrum salicaria).

Restoration work in the Canebrake Ecological Reserve and South Fork Valley includes removing damaging invasive species, such as tamarisk (Tamarix) trees and exotic purple loose-strife (Lythrum salicaria).

A total of 340 acres (1.4 km^{2}) were replanted with Fremont cottonwood and red willow on the South Fork Kern River, from 1987 to 1993. The plantings are on floodplain sites from which these species had been removed and the land cleared for agriculture. The survival rates for these plantings have exceeded 90 per cent.

== See also ==
- Kern River Preserve
- Canebrake, California
- Riparian forest
- Riparian zone
- Riparian zone restoration
- Floodplain restoration
- List of plants of the Sierra Nevada (U.S.)
