= South Lake, Kern County, California =

Unincorporated community in California, United States

South Lake
- Unincorporated community
- Location in California Location within the United States
- Coordinates: 35°38′01″N 118°21′23″W
- Country: United States
- State: California
- County: Kern
- Elevation: 2,890 ft (880 m)

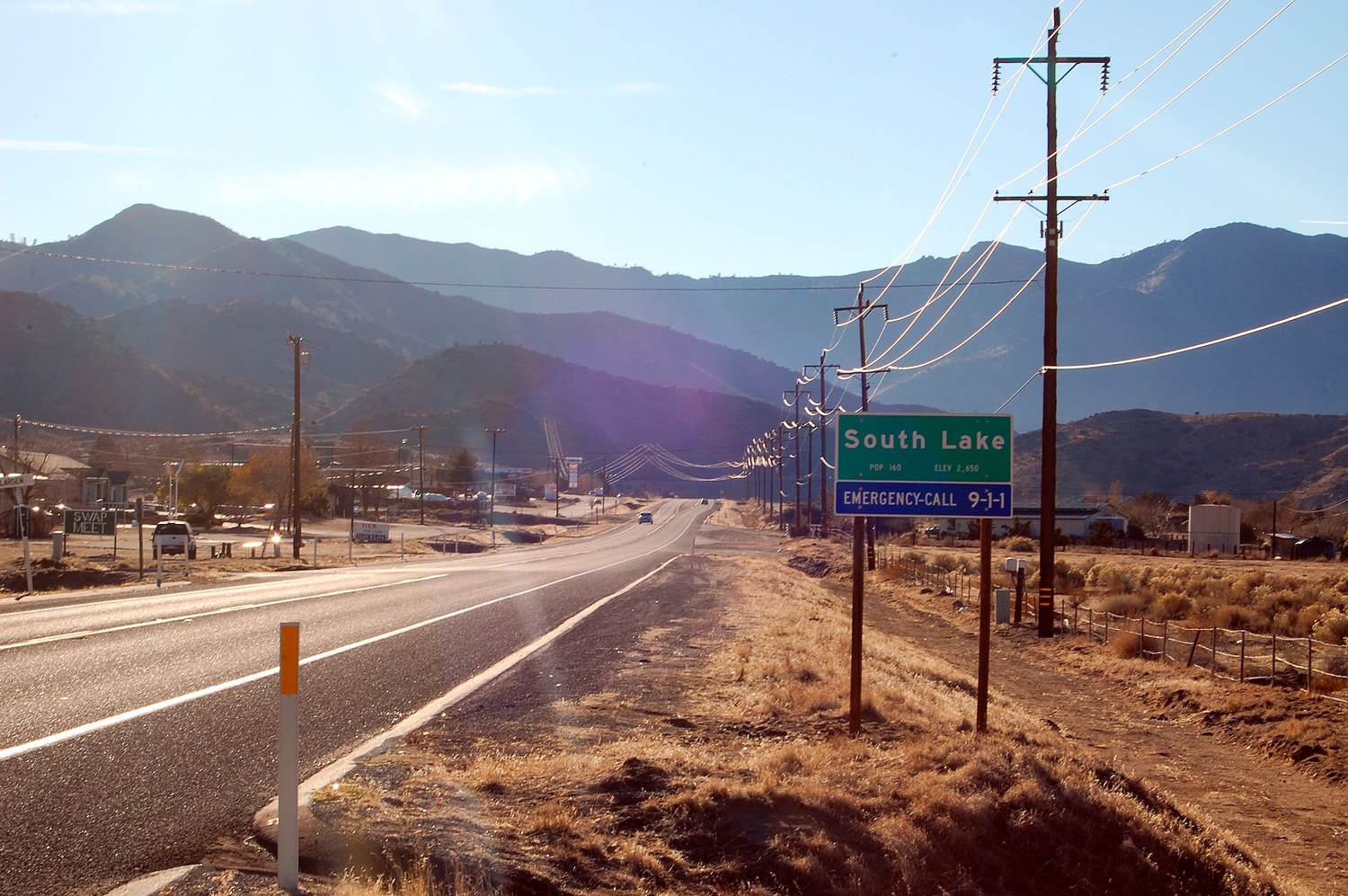
Guide sign at the east extent of South Lake.

South Lake is an unincorporated community in the Kern River Valley, in Kern County, California, United States. It is located 4.5 miles (7.2 km) west-southwest of Weldon, at an elevation of 2,887 feet (880 m).

South Lake is located along the south shore of Lake Isabella. A CalTrans G9-2 guide sign posted along SR178 identifies the population as 160. The community uses the Weldon, California ZIP Code of 93283, and is contained within Area code 760.

== History ==
According to the National Register for Historic Places, a Tübatulabal tribal settlement existed in this area circa 1499.

From June 23 to July 11, 2016, the community was devastated by the 43,000-acre Erskine fire, which burned over 100 mobile home trailers and houses to the ground in a 1-square-mile area, killing two.

== Geography ==
This populated place has a US Geological Survey (USGS), National Geographic Names Database feature ID of either 1867057 (current) or 1661474 (in older editions). Elevation above mean sea level is shown as 2,887 feet (880 m).

South Lake, California is located along SR178 between Bella Vista and Mountain Mesa. The community is in the South Fork portion of the Kern River Valley.

Kern County Fire Department, "South Lake" Station 71 is located at 9000 Navajo Ave. The station is identified as part of organizational unit "Battalion 7."

South of town, Goat Ranch Canyon extends into the Piute Mountains.

Climate data for South Lake, California, 1991–2020 normals
Month	Jan	Feb	Mar	Apr	May	Jun	Jul	Aug	Sep	Oct	Nov	Dec	Year
Mean daily maximum °F (°C)	59.1 (15.1)	61.7 (16.5)	66.6 (19.2)	72.8 (22.7)	82.4 (28.0)	92.0 (33.3)	98.1 (36.7)	97.7 (36.5)	91.4 (33.0)	80.5 (26.9)	68.7 (20.4)	58.1 (14.5)	77.4 (25.2)
Daily mean °F (°C)	44.6 (7.0)	47.6 (8.7)	51.5 (10.8)	56.6 (13.7)	67.2 (19.6)	75.6 (24.2)	81.6 (27.6)	80.0 (26.7)	73.1 (22.8)	61.6 (16.4)	51.4 (10.8)	43.9 (6.6)	61.2 (16.2)
Mean daily minimum °F (°C)	30.1 (−1.1)	33.5 (0.8)	36.3 (2.4)	40.3 (4.6)	52.0 (11.1)	59.1 (15.1)	65.1 (18.4)	62.3 (16.8)	54.7 (12.6)	42.6 (5.9)	34.1 (1.2)	29.7 (−1.3)	45.0 (7.2)
Source: NOAA

== Demographics ==
Historical population
Census	Pop.	Note	%±
2000	1,059		—
U.S. Decennial Census; 1850–1870 1880-1890; 1900 1910 1920; 1930 1940 1950; 1960 1970 1980; 1990 2000 2010

South Lake first appeared as a census designated place in the 1990 U.S. Census. Deleted as a CDP prior to the 2000 U.S. Census; part absorbed by the Weldon CDP.

== See also ==
- Weldon, California
