= Tübatulabal language =

Extinct Uto-Aztecan language of Kern County, California, US

Tübatulabal
- Pahkaʼanil
- Native to: United States
- Region: Kern River, California
- Ethnicity: 900 Tübatulabal (2007)
- Extinct: July 30, 2008, with the death of Jim Andreas
- Language family: Uto-Aztecan: Tübatulabal
- Dialects: Bakalanchi; Pakanapul; Palegawan
- Writing system: transcribed in the Latin script

Language codes
- ISO 639-3: tub
- Glottolog: tuba1278
- ELP: Tubatulabal
- Tübatulabal

- Tubatubalal is classified as Critically Endangered by the UNESCO Atlas of the World's Languages in Danger.

Tübatulabal /təˈbɑːtələbɑːl/ is a Uto-Aztecan language, traditionally spoken in Kern County, California, United States. It is the traditional language of the Tübatulabal, who have switched to English. The language originally had three main dialects: Bakalanchi, Pakanapul and Palegawan.

In English, the name Tübatulabal refers to both the Tübatulabal people and their language. However, in the language itself, the term Tübatulabal refers only to the Tübatulabal people. Its origin is unclear, but it may be related to the noun stem tɨba- "pine nuts". The Tübatulabal term for the Tübatulabal language is Pahkaʼanil.

== Phonology ==
=== Vowels ===
There are six phonemic vowels in Tübatulabal:

	Front	Central	Back
Close	i	ɨ	u
Mid	e		ɔ
Open		a	

Contrastive short and long versions of each vowel are found in both stressed and unstressed syllables. The vowels have various allophones which occur in different environments, most notably more central lax allophones when the vowels are short and occur in unstressed syllables. i and u can occur as the second member of a diphthong with any other vowel, resulting in ten possible diphthongs (Voegelin reports that ɨu is rare). Phonologically, the members of a diphthong are treated as distinct segments. For example, the common initial reduplication process, which copies the first stem vowel, copies only the first member of a diphthong, e.g.:

ʔuinul 'the sucker fish'
ʔuʔuinul 'the many suckers in one place'

Vowel length is contrastive. However, according to (Jensen 1973), in the suffixing morphology length is typically predictable. In most cases, the first suffix is short, the second suffix is long, the third suffix is short, and so on. For example, the verbal stem tɨk- 'to eat' can be expanded to tɨk-ilɔːɡ-ɔ-maːla 'let us go and pretend to eat'. In this word, each suffix alternates in length compared to its neighbors. When arranged differently, the same suffixes will have different lengths. Thus compare maːla 'let us' with the realization of the same morpheme in tɨk-al-aː-mala 'let us go eat'.

Tübatulabal consonants show a basic voicing distinction, with a corresponding alternately voiced phoneme present for almost every obstruent. Tübatulabal voiceless consonants are unaspirated, like those in English after an initial /s/, e.g. as in 'spin', 'stiff', 'skin'.

Non-contrastive allophones of all vowels occur, usually when a vowel follows a nasal consonant, and especially when it also precedes a glottal consonant.

=== Consonants ===
		Labial	Alveolar		Palatal	Velar	Glottal
Nasal		m	n			ŋ	
Plosive	voiceless	p	t	ts	tʃ	k	ʔ
Plosive	voiced	b	d	dz	dʒ	ɡ	
Fricative					ʃ		h
Approximant			l		j	w	

All consonants except the glottal stop can occur as geminates. Gemination is often phonologically predictable. In particular, all consonants except the voiced stops and the glottal stop geminate when following a short vowel. All stops and affricates are geminated in word-final position, regardless of the length of the preceding vowel.

=== Prosody ===
Tübatulabal has predictable word stress, which is tied to morphological constituency and syllable weight. Primary stress falls on the final syllable of the stem. Secondary stress is assigned right to left from the final syllable, falling on every other mora:

ˌʔɨmbɨŋˌwibaˈʔat "he is wanting to roll string on his thigh"
ˌjuːuˌduːˌjuːuˈdat "the fruit is mashing"

Words with the form VːCVCV will be stressed as ˌVːCVˈCV:

ˌnaːwiˈʃul "the pine-nut pole"

For the purposes of stress assignment, two identical short vowels that are separated only by a glottal stop are treated as a single vowel if and only if they belong to the same morpheme:

ˌkuʔud͡ʒuˈbil "the little one"

== Orthography ==
Transcriptions in this article follow the International Phonetic Alphabet (IPA). Much published material concerning Tübatulabal uses the Americanist orthography. In addition, the most important linguistic work on Tübatulabal, the original grammatical description of the language, (Voegelin 1935) uses a somewhat different orthography.

Voegelin writes the following as:

/ɨ/	/ɔ/	/ʃ/	/t͡ʃ/	/ʔ/	/d͡ʒ/	/j/
⟨ï⟩	⟨ô⟩	⟨c⟩	⟨tc⟩	⟨‘⟩	⟨dž⟩	⟨y⟩

He also uses a number of special symbols for vocalic allophones.

⟨ι⟩ is an allophone of ⟨i⟩
⟨μ⟩ (IPA /ʊ/) is an allophone of ⟨u⟩
⟨o⟩ is an allophone of ⟨ô⟩ (IPA /ɔ/)
⟨ŏ⟩ is an allophone of both ⟨a⟩ and ⟨ô⟩

The letter ⟨ü⟩ in the name Tübatulabal represents the central unrounded vowel /ɨ/.

In Voegelin 1958, Voegelin notes: "the University of California Press replaced my back high open manuscript vowel [ʊ] by Greek mu (sic!), and placed an inverted wedge over [o] to indicate my open [ɔ]."

== Morphology ==
There are three basic word types in Tübatulabal: verbs, nouns, and particles. Verbs may be formed from verbal stems or from noun stems with verbalizing morphology; similarly, nouns can be formed from noun stems or from verbal stems with nominalizing morphology. Particles have their own stems, but they have comparatively little inflection, whereas both verbs and nouns tend to be very morphologically complex.

There are four word-formation processes in Tübatulabal: suffixation, reduplication, conjunction and compounding.

=== Suffixation ===
Suffixation is the most common and productive process in agglutinative word-formation. Suffixes form a closed class and occur in a fixed order according to the word type.

=== Reduplication ===
There are two kinds of reduplication: full reduplication and partial reduplication. Full reduplication is the less common type and marks the iterative aspect in verbs.

Partial reduplication can occur as initial or final reduplication. Final reduplication is very rare and always expresses the idea of plural allegiance. It is also apparently limited to occurring with noun stems or suffixes that end in wa. Voegelin illustrates with an example:

tɔhat͡siŋwan 'his hunting partner'
tɔhat͡siŋwawaːn 'his hunting partner (in the sense that the partner referred to, being very proficient, has many companions in hunting)'

Initial reduplication is far more productive. It is used to express collective plurality in nouns and to express aspect reversal in verbs. Initial reduplication prefixes a copy of the first vowel of the stem (as well as any immediately following nasal), preceded by a fixed ʔ. The underlying stem-initial consonant (if any) may also undergo changes, particularly in voicing and length. Some examples illustrate the reduplication process:

Base form gloss	Base form	Reduplicated form
to eat	tɨk-	ʔɨtːɨk
to get down	tana-	ʔandana
to be tired	paːabɨ-	ʔaːbaːabi
the duck	kulaːabiʃt	ʔukːulaːabiʃt

=== Conjunction ===
Conjunction involves the combination of a particle with a word of another type. According to Voegelin, the behavior of particles is similar to that of enclitics in other Uto-Aztecan languages but distinct enough from them that it should not be considered to be a kind of cliticization.

=== Compounding ===
Compounding appears to have been a much more productive process at an earlier stage of the language. It now has very limited productivity, and in many cases, it appears to have been completely lexicalized if it occurs.

=== Verb morphology ===
Each verb stem has an unpredictable inherent aspect value (either telic or atelic; by default, a bare stem is inherently atelic), and an inherent value for transitivity (transitive, intransitive or impersonal). The inherent values can be changed by morphological addition to yield a verb stem with any of the other possible values. Aspect reversal is indicated by initial reduplication. Transitivity change is indicated by the use of one (or more) of a number of derivational suffixes with which verbs are constructed.

The full verb structure can be summarized as (A) + B + (C) + (D), where B is the verb root, and the other positions (all optional) represent classes of morphemes. A indicates initial reduplication, which can occur only once per word. C indicates a class of derivational morphemes, which can be divided into ten ordered positions, each of which allows at most one morpheme per word. D is the final position; there are nine possible morphemes in final position, but only one can occur in any single word.

The C class morphemes are given with examples in the table below. When these morphemes co-occur in a word, they must occur in the order given. They have a different effect depending on the inherent transitivity of the verb root, as well as the presence of other transitivity-changing morphology.

Suffix	Gloss	Example
-(i)n	causative (Note: Transitivity changing morpheme)	hɔːhinat 's/he is coughing (through the agency of a crumb)'
-(a)n	benefactive	weleʔanat kɔːimi 's/he is crawling to the woman' (perhaps in the sense of "he is crawling there for the erotic benefit of the woman")
-(a)la/-(a)ɡiːm/-(a)kin/-(a)min	movement	ʔɨtːɨkːamin 's/he ate it here and went away'
-(i)niːnɨm	distributive	ʔawaʃiniːnɨm 's/he dug first here, then there'
-(i)lɔːk	pretending to	ʔanaŋaːlilɔːɡibaʔat 's/he wants to go along pretending he is crying'
-(i)baʔ	desiderative	ʔamaɡiːibaʔ 's/he is on the verge of learning about it'
-(i)ʃa	future	ʔapaʔaniʃa 'it will get plugged up'
-(i)w	passive	weːhiwat 's/he is being licked' (e.g. kitten by mother cat)
-(i)wɨːt	collective-intensive	ʔapahkaniwɨːdiʃa 'they will speak Tübatulabal'
-(a)puw-	similative	wɨʃɨpuwat 'it seems to be ripening'

The possible verbal final morphemes (class D) are shown below. Unlike the class C morphemes, only one of these final-position morphemes can occur in any single word. Therefore, the ordering of morphemes in this table does not indicate anything about a linear relationship among the morphemes.

Suffix/suffix type	Gloss	Example
Nominalizers	–	kabobaːʔinaːnat͡siŋwajinɨʔɨŋ 'my partner in rattling for it (the dance)'
Subordinaters	–	ʔalaːwiʔima tɨkːat 's/he is eating while talking'
Imperatives	–	tɔhaːhai tɔhiːla 'hunt the deer after a while'
-(a)t	present tense	ʔɔhtatni 's/he is asking me'
-(a)ma	exhortative	waʃamaːala 'let's dig it'
-(a)ha	permissive	wɔːʔiʃɨhatd͡za 's/he might get jealous'
-(i)ukaŋ	past habituative	t͡saːijinaːniukaŋ 's/he used to make lace'
-(aː)haiwɨt	irrealis	muːdakaːhaiwɨt 's/he should have dodged'
-(a)htajat	adversative	pɨːminahtajat 's/he is making it full (despite the fact that the thing to be filled is very large)'

=== Noun morphology ===
All nouns (whether derived from verb stems or noun stems) are obligatorily marked as absolute or relative. Nouns must also be marked with one of the three basic cases: subject, object, or genitive. Relative nouns make a finer distinction between suus and ejus objects and genitives. In addition to this obligatory morphology, nouns may also receive suffixes indicating several secondary cases (inessive, ablative, allative and instrumental) as well as many other derivational suffixes.

Nouns may be divided into three basic classes according to their stem shape and morphological behavior and sometimes according to their semantic contribution as well. The basic test for classification is how the noun occurs when it is absolute. The absolute suffix has a different allomorph when it occurs with a noun from each of these classes.

- Class A nouns all have vowel-final stems, and add the absolute suffix as -l.
- Class B noun stems may be vowel-final or consonant-final, but in either case the absolute suffix is -t.
- Class C is a small class of nouns, many of which are kinship terms or other inalienable nouns. The absolute noun is phonologically null when it occurs with class C nouns.

Each of the classes can be subdivided into two or more classes, depending on phonological differences in the noun stem that lead to divergent behavior in certain case forms.

- Class A
  1. stems end with a long vowel
  2. stems end with a short vowel
- Class B
  1. stem ends in a short vowel
  2. stem ends in a long vowel
  3. stem ends in n
  4. stem ends in m
  5. stem ends in a voiceless consonant
- Class C
  1. nouns which take an overt relative suffix
  2. nouns with no overt relative suffix

noun classes and subclasses, with all obligatory cases (Note: The forms in this table except for ejus are taken directly from (Voegelin 1935). The few forms that are hypothetical are marked with *.)
Class		Stem	Gloss	Absolute			Relative (Note: Relative nouns typically require a suffix indicating the possessor or entity to which the suffixed noun is related. Forms in this table are those for a third-person singular possessor -n. The exception is suus forms, which do not allow a possessive suffix (since they are inherently possessed by/related to the grammatical subject of the clause).)				
Class		Stem	Gloss	Subject	Object	Genitive	Subject	Object		Genitive	
Class		Stem	Gloss	Subject	Object	Genitive	Subject	Suus	Ejus	Suus	Ejus (Note: The ejus forms are not given in (Voegelin 1935). The forms in this table are hypothesized on the basis of the suffix charts that Voegelin gives.)
A	1	haniː	house	haniːl	haniːla	haniːliŋ	haniːn	haniː	haniːjin	haniː	haniːnin
A	2	t͡ʃaːmi	acorn gravy	t͡ʃaːmil	t͡ʃaːmila	t͡ʃaːmilaʔaŋ	t͡ʃaːmin	t͡ʃaːmi	t͡ʃaːmijin	t͡ʃaːmiʔin	t͡ʃaːmiʔinin
B	1	pit͡ʃiliː	squirrel	pit͡ʃiliːt	pit͡ʃiliːida	pit͡ʃiliːidiŋ	pit͡ʃiliːn	pit͡ʃiliː	pit͡ʃiliːijip	pit͡ʃiliʔin	pit͡ʃiliːʔinin
B	2	maːaʃa	sack	maːaʃat	maːʃata	maːʃatiŋ	maːaʃap	maːaʃat͡s	maːʃat͡sip	maːʃaʔadin	maːaʃaʔinin
B	3	ʃulun	fingernail	ʃulunt	ʃulunda	ʃulundiŋ	ʃulunin *	ʃulun	ʃuluninip	ʃulunʔin	ʃulunʔinin
B	4	pɔm	egg	pɔmt	pɔmda	pɔmdiŋ	pɔmin *	pɔm	pɔmd͡zip	pɔmin *	pɔminin
B	5	muːʃ	fish spear	muːʃt	muːʃta	muːʃtiŋ	muːʃn *	muːʃ *	muːʃip	muːʃin	muːʃinin
C	1	tahambiʃ	old man	tahambiʃ	tahambiʃi	tahambiʃiŋ	tahambiʃin *	tahambiʃ	tahambiʃin *	tahambiʃʔin	tahambiʃʔinin
C	2	naːadɨʔ	cat	naːadɨʔ	naːadɨʔi	naːadɨʔiŋ	naːadɨʔap	naːadɨʔai	naːadɨʔajin	naːadɨʔaʔin	naːadɨʔaʔinin

=== Particle morphology ===
Morphemes belonging to the particle class are distinguished by the fact that they undergo little or no inflection and suffixation, unlike verbs and nouns. The particle class includes two subclasses of morphemes which behave quite differently: conjunctive particles and independent particles.

Conjunctive particles resemble clitics in that they never appear independently but always lean on another word. However, unlike clitics, conjunctive particles typically bear their own stress, and they do not alter the stress of the word on which they lean. Conjunctive particles include various discourse and modal morphemes as well as the typical pronominal agreement morphemes that occur with verbs.

Independent particles are fully independent words. They include prepositional, modal and exclamatory morphemes, numerals, and one class of pronouns.

The table below shows the pronominal morphemes of Tübatulabal. Like nouns, pronouns distinguish between three cases: subject, object and possessive. (Pronouns do not make a distinction between absolute and relative entities.) Different forms exist for first-, second- and third-person entities. Second- and third-person forms distinguish only singular and plural numbers, but first-person forms distinguish between singular, dual inclusive, dual exclusive, and plural numbers. All pronouns may be expressed bu conjunctive particles. The subject pronouns are unique in that they can also be expressed by an independent particle.

			Subject		Object	Possessive
			independent	conjunctive	conjunctive	conjunctive
1st person	singular		nik	-ɡi	-ni	-nɨʔɨŋ
1st person	dual	inclusive	iŋɡila	-ɡila	? (Note: Forms missing without explanation in (Voegelin 1935).)	?
1st person	dual	exclusive	iŋɡilaʔaŋ	-ɡilaʔaŋ	-d͡ʒijaʔaŋ	-t͡ʃ
1st person	plural		iŋɡiluːt͡s	-ɡiluːt͡s	-d͡ziː	-t͡s
2nd person	singular		imbi	-bi	-diŋ	-iŋ
2nd person	plural		imbuːmu	-buːmu	-dulu	ulu
3rd person	singular		in	(-d͡za)	– (Note: Phonologically null.)	-n
3rd person	plural		inda	-da	-tɨpɨ	-p

The first-person subject conjunctive forms have special allomorphs when they occur with the exhortative suffix -ma:

1sg.	–
1d.inc.	-la
1d.inc.	-laʔaŋ
1pl.	-luːt͡s

The third-person conjunctive form is usually null, but it is expressed by -d͡za after the exhortative or permissive suffixes. (The suffix often undergoes syncope and devoicing, yielding -t͡s.) The second-person conjunctive plural subject form may also syncopate, and medial vowel then shortens as well: -bum. The first-person conjunctive singular subject form may also syncopate, triggering devoicing but no irregular phonology: the suffix then has the form -k.

Subject pronouns typically lean on verbs (if conjunctive) and correspond to grammatical subject: iwikkːɨki "I discarded (it)" (with devoicing); anabaːhaʃta "they can throw it" (with metathesis of the components of the affricate and a change of s > ʃ).

Object pronouns also lean on verbs and indicate any non-possessive oblique function, including transitive objects, ditransitive objects or benefactives, objects of imperative verbs, and subjects of subordinate verbs if not equivalent to the subject of the matrix verb.

Possessive pronouns typically lean on the possessum: haniːnɨʔɨŋ "my house"; ʃɔːɔjin "his wife".

== Syntax ==
Word order is generally flexible. According to (Voegelin 1935, p. 185), "Word-order in general is stylistic rather than obligatory."

== Bibliography ==
- Aion, Nora (2003). Selected Topics in Nootka and Tübatulabal Phonology (PhD dissertation). City University of New York.
- Arvidson, Lucy (1976). Alaawich (Our Language): First Book of Words in the Tübatulabal Language of Southern California.
- Crowhurst, Megan (1991). "Demorification in Tübatulabal: Evidence from Initial Reduplication and Stress". NELS. 21: 49–63. hdl:20.500.14394/36661.
- Gifford, Edward Winslow (1917). Tübatulabal and Kawaiisu kinship terms. Berkeley, CA: University of California Press.
- Heath, Jeffrey (1981). "Tübatulabal Phonology". Harvard Studies in Phonology. 2.
- Jensen, James R. (1973). Stress and the Verbal Phonology of Tübatulabal (PhD dissertation). Indiana University.
- Manaster Ramer, Alexis (1992). "Proto-Uto-Aztecan Phonology: Evidence From Tübatulabal Noun Morphophonemics". International Journal of American Linguistics. 58 (4): 436–446. doi:10.1086/ijal.58.4.3519778. JSTOR 3519778. S2CID 147964960.
- Voegelin, Charles F. (1935a). "Tübatulabal Grammar". University of California Publications in American Archaeology and Ethnology. 34: 55–190.
- Voegelin, Charles F. (1935b). "Tubatulabal Texts". University of California Publications in American Archaeology and Ethnology. 34: 191–246.
- Voegelin, Charles F. (1958). "Working Dictionary of Tübatulabal". International Journal of American Linguistics. 24 (3): 221–228. doi:10.1086/464459. S2CID 145758965.
