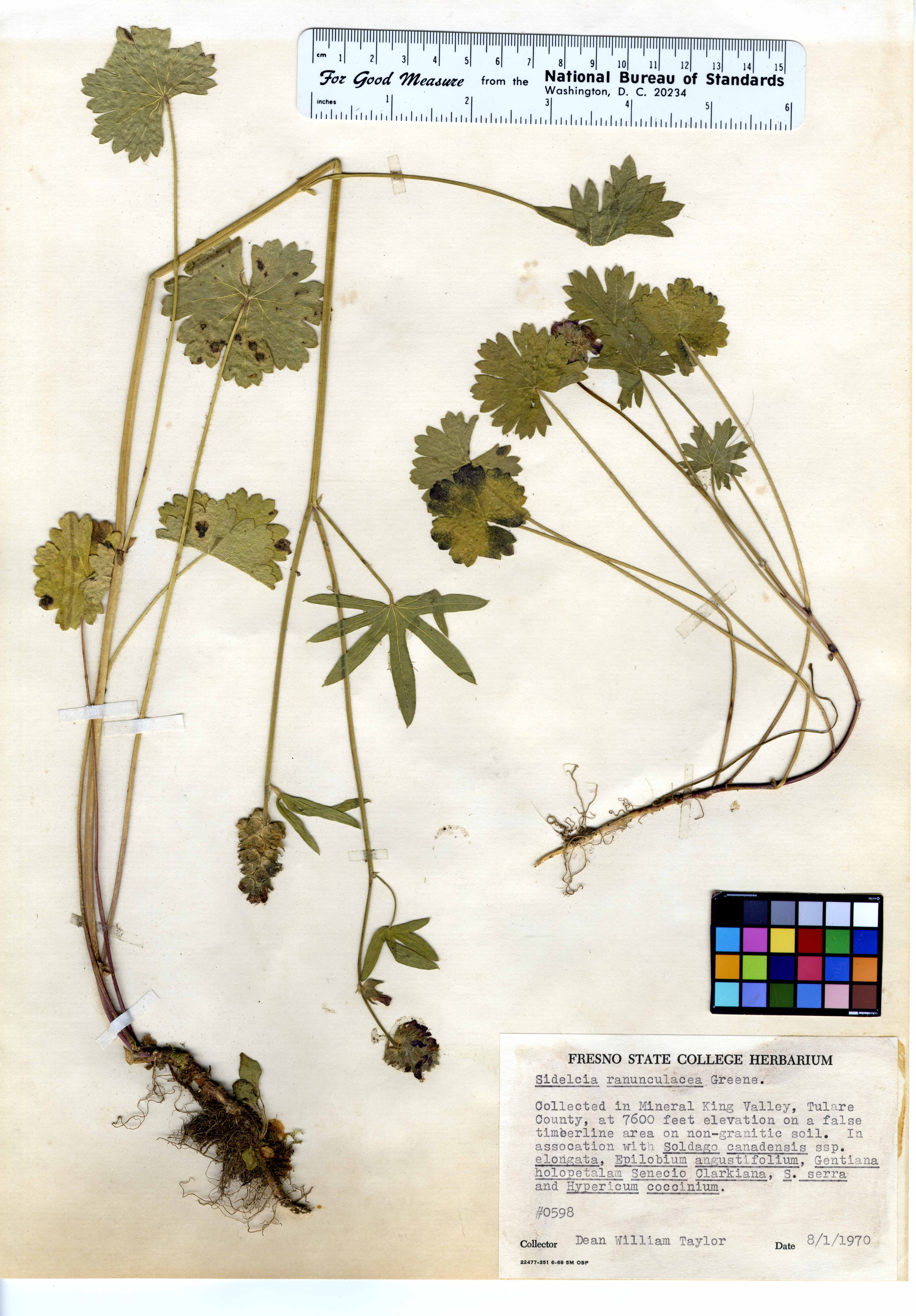

Scientific classification
- Kingdom: Plantae
- Clade: Tracheophytes
- Clade: Angiosperms
- Clade: Eudicots
- Clade: Rosids
- Order: Malvales
- Family: Malvaceae
- Genus: Sidalcea
- Species: S. ranunculacea

Binomial name
- Sidalcea ranunculacea Greene

= Sidalcea ranunculacea =

Species of flowering plant

Sidalcea ranunculacea is a species of flowering plant in the mallow family known by the common name marsh checkerbloom and marsh checker mallow.

== Distribution ==
The plant is endemic to California, known only within Tulare County and Kern County. It grows in the Southern Sierra Nevada and Greenhorn Mountains at 1,820–3,050 metres (5,970–10,010 ft) in elevation. Many populations are within the Sequoia National Forest, Sequoia National Park, or Kings Canyon National Park.

It grows in moist areas, such as wet meadows and on stream banks, in yellow pine forest, red fir forest, lodgepole forest habitats.

== Description ==
Sidalcea ranunculacea is a rhizomatous perennial herb reaching up to 0.5 metres (1.6 ft) tall. It is coated in hairs, the lower ones becoming bristly. The fleshy lobed leaf blades also have hairs and bristles.

The inflorescence is a dense, spikelike cluster or series of clusters of flowers. Each flower has five pink to purple petals up to 1.5 centimeters long. The blooming period is June to August.

== See also ==
- Flora of the Sierra Nevada
