= Mountain Mesa, California =

Mountain Mesa
- census-designated place
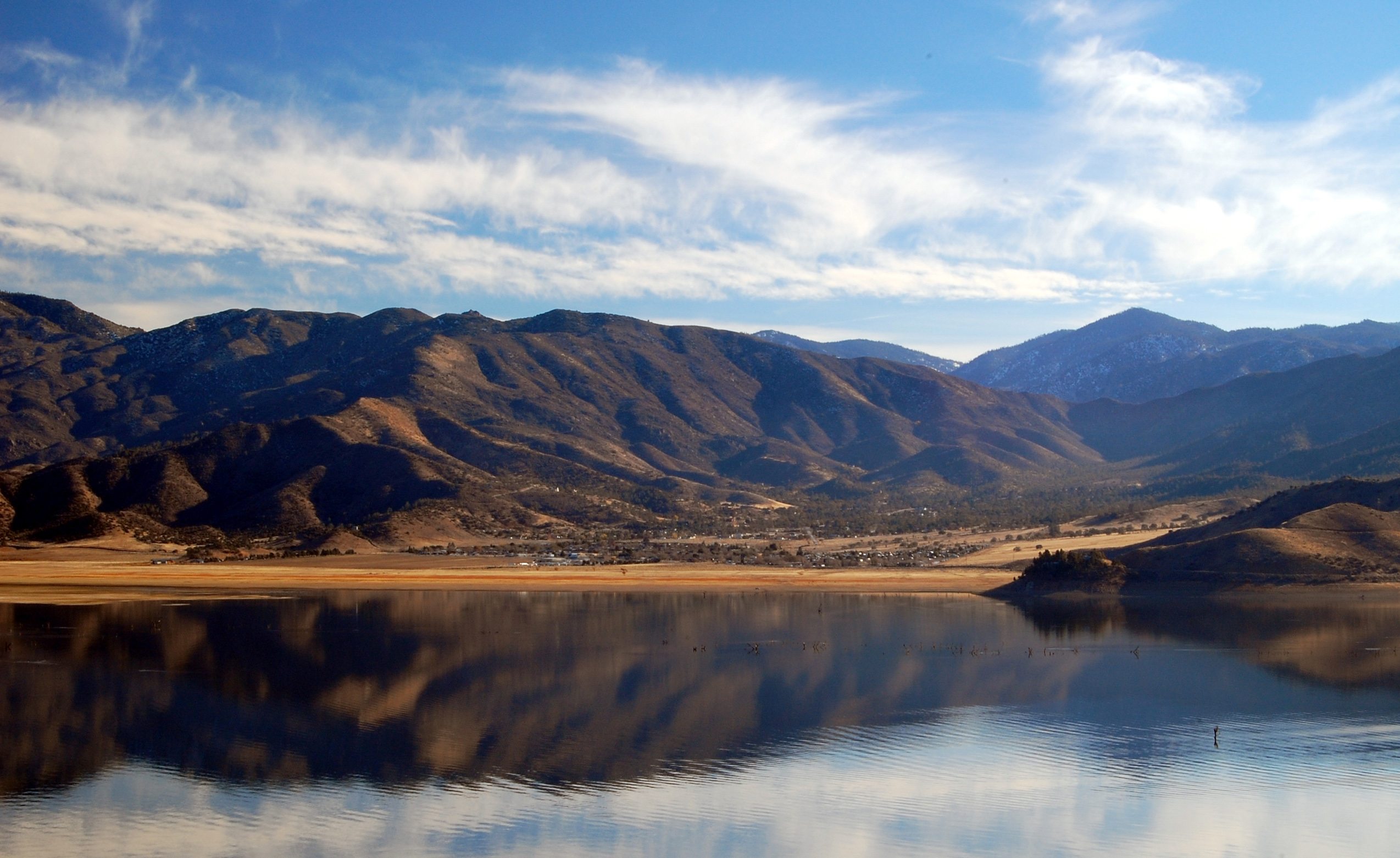
- Mountain Mesa viewed from across Lake Isabella

- Location in Kern County and the state of California

- Location in the United States
- Coordinates: 35°38′22″N 118°24′20″W
- Country: United States
- State: California
- County: Kern

Government
  - State senator: Shannon Grove (R)
  - Assemblymember: Stan Ellis (R)
  - U. S. rep.: Vince Fong (R)

Area
  - Total: 0.867 sq mi (2.246 km^{2})
  - Land: 0.867 sq mi (2.246 km^{2})
  - Water: 0 sq mi (0 km^{2}) 0%
- Elevation: 2,641 ft (805 m)

Population (2020)
  - Total: 823
  - Density: 949/sq mi (366/km^{2})
- Time zone: UTC-8 (PST)
  - Summer (DST): UTC-7 (PDT)
- ZIP code: 93240
- Area codes: 442/760
- FIPS code: 06-49600
- GNIS feature ID: 1661074

Mountain Mesa (often shortened to Mt. Mesa) is a census-designated place (CDP) in Kern County, California, United States. Mountain Mesa is located 2 miles (3.2 km) west of South Lake at an elevation of 2,641 feet (805 m). The population was 823 at the 2020 census, up from 777 at the 2010 census.

== Geography ==
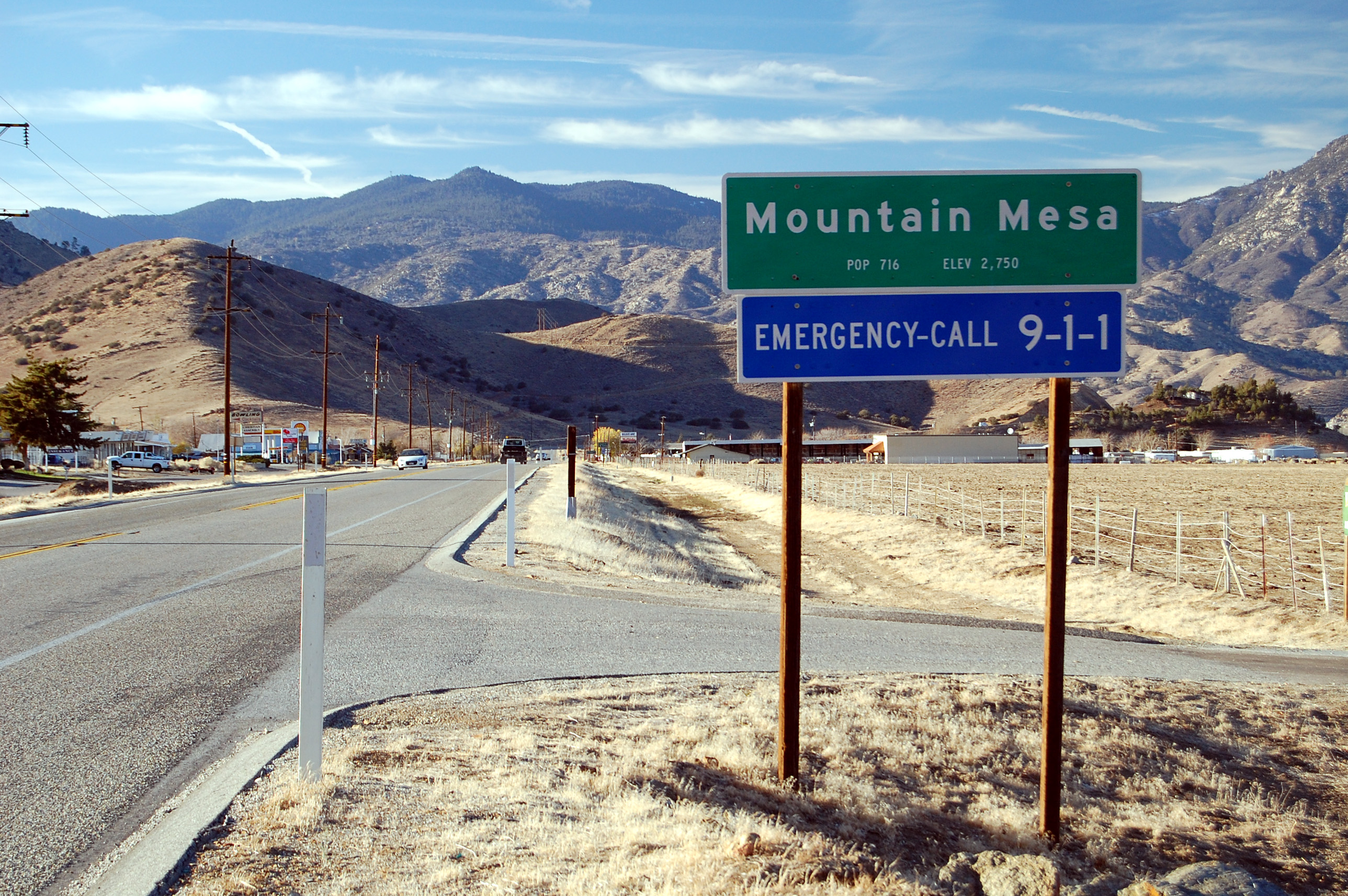
CalTrans guide sign marking the eastern extent of town along SR178

Mountain Mesa is located along the south shore of Lake Isabella at 35°38′22″N 118°24′20″W.

According to the United States Census Bureau, the CDP has a total area of 0.867 square miles (2.246 km^{2}), all land.

== Demographics ==
Historical population
Census	Pop.	Note	%±
1990	1,153		—
2000	716		−37.9%
2010	777		8.5%
2020	823		5.9%
U.S. Decennial Census; 1860–1870 1880-1890; 1900 1910 1920; 1930 1940 1950; 1960 1970 1980; 1990 2000 2010; 2020

Mountain Mesa first appeared as a census designated place in the 1990 United States census.

=== 2020 ===
Mountain Mesa CDP, California – Racial and ethnic composition Note: the US Census treats Hispanic/Latino as an ethnic category. This table excludes Latinos from the racial categories and assigns them to a separate category. Hispanics/Latinos may be of any race.
Race / Ethnicity (NH = Non-Hispanic)	Pop 2000	Pop 2010	Pop 2020	% 2000	% 2010	% 2020
White alone (NH)	663	647	664	92.60%	83.27%	80.68%
Black or African American alone (NH)	2	7	5	0.28%	0.90%	0.61%
Native American or Alaska Native alone (NH)	2	12	10	0.28%	1.54%	1.22%
Asian alone (NH)	0	6	7	0.00%	0.77%	0.85%
Native Hawaiian or Pacific Islander alone (NH)	1	2	1	0.14%	0.26%	0.12%
Other race alone (NH)	0	0	2	0.00%	0.00%	0.24%
Mixed race or Multiracial (NH)	21	26	50	2.93%	3.35%	6.08%
Hispanic or Latino (any race)	27	77	84	3.77%	9.91%	10.21%
Total	716	777	823	100.00%	100.00%	100.00%

The 2020 United States census reported that Mountain Mesa had a population of 823. The population density was 949.3 inhabitants per square mile (366.5/km^{2}). The racial makeup of Mountain Mesa was 705 (85.7%) White, 5 (0.6%) African American, 11 (1.3%) Native American, 7 (0.9%) Asian, 1 (0.1%) Pacific Islander, 25 (3.0%) from other races, and 69 (8.4%) from two or more races. Hispanic or Latino of any race were 84 persons (10.2%).

The census reported that 765 people (93.0% of the population) lived in households and 58 (7.0%) were institutionalized.

There were 330 households, out of which 59 (17.9%) had children under the age of 18 living in them, 146 (44.2%) were married-couple households, 16 (4.8%) were cohabiting couple households, 60 (18.2%) had a female householder with no partner present, and 108 (32.7%) had a male householder with no partner present. 114 households (34.5%) were one person, and 66 (20.0%) were one person aged 65 or older. The average household size was 2.32. There were 191 families (57.9% of all households).

The age distribution was 136 people (16.5%) under the age of 18, 40 people (4.9%) aged 18 to 24, 156 people (19.0%) aged 25 to 44, 269 people (32.7%) aged 45 to 64, and 222 people (27.0%) who were 65 years of age or older. The median age was 51.9 years. For every 100 females, there were 100.7 males.

There were 420 housing units at an average density of 484.4 units per square mile (187.0 units/km^{2}), of which 330 (78.6%) were occupied. Of these, 252 (76.4%) were owner-occupied, and 78 (23.6%) were occupied by renters.

=== 2010 ===
At the 2010 census Mountain Mesa had a population of 777. The population density was 934.7 inhabitants per square mile (360.9/km^{2}). The racial makeup of Mountain Mesa was 687 (88.4%) White, 7 (0.9%) African American, 16 (2.1%) Native American, 6 (0.8%) Asian, 2 (0.3%) Pacific Islander, 27 (3.5%) from other races, and 32 (4.1%) from two or more races. Hispanic or Latino of any race were 77 people (9.9%).

The census reported that 715 people (92.0% of the population) lived in households, no one lived in non-institutionalized group quarters and 62 (8.0%) were institutionalized.

There were 304 households, 80 (26.3%) had children under the age of 18 living in them, 139 (45.7%) were opposite-sex married couples living together, 26 (8.6%) had a female householder with no husband present, 27 (8.9%) had a male householder with no wife present. There were 18 (5.9%) unmarried opposite-sex partnerships, and 5 (1.6%) same-sex married couples or partnerships. 88 households (28.9%) were one person and 44 (14.5%) had someone living alone who was 65 or older. The average household size was 2.35. There were 192 families (63.2% of households); the average family size was 2.88.

The age distribution was 155 people (19.9%) under the age of 18, 51 people (6.6%) aged 18 to 24, 133 people (17.1%) aged 25 to 44, 222 people (28.6%) aged 45 to 64, and 216 people (27.8%) who were 65 or older. The median age was 49.8 years. For every 100 females, there were 101.3 males. For every 100 females age 18 and over, there were 93.2 males.

There were 368 housing units at an average density of 442.7 per square mile, of the occupied units 235 (77.3%) were owner-occupied and 69 (22.7%) were rented. The homeowner vacancy rate was 2.9%; the rental vacancy rate was 18.6%. 520 people (66.9% of the population) lived in owner-occupied housing units and 195 people (25.1%) lived in rental housing units.

=== 2000 ===
At the 2000 census, the median household income was $23,875 and the median family income was $32,656. Males had a median income of $26,161 versus $14,797 for females. The per capita income for the CDP was $13,759. About 28.9% of families and 27.7% of the population were below the poverty line, including 59.2% of those under age 18 and 31.5% of those age 65 or over.
