= Onyx, California =

Onyx
- Unincorporated Community; Census Designated Place
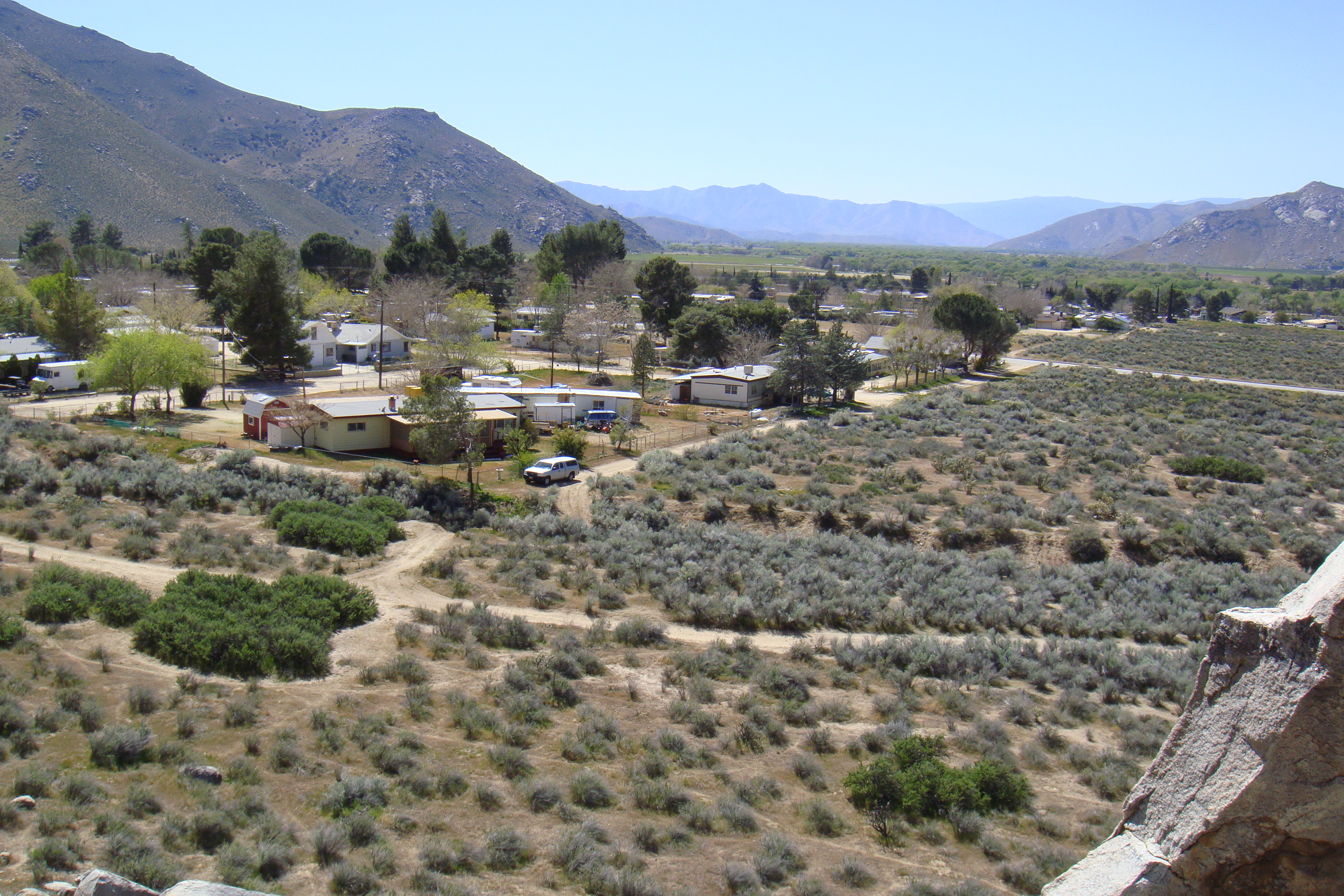
- Overview of Onyx, CA

- Location in Kern County and the state of California

- Location in the United States
- Coordinates: 35°41′25″N 118°13′14″W
- Country: United States
- State: California
- County: Kern

Government
  - State senator: Shannon Grove (R)
  - Assemblymember: Stan Ellis (R)
  - U. S. rep.: Vince Fong (R)

Area
  - Total: 11.529 sq mi (29.860 km^{2})
  - Land: 11.451 sq mi (29.658 km^{2})
  - Water: 0.078 sq mi (0.202 km^{2}) 0.677%
- Elevation: 2,795 ft (852 m)

Population (2020)
  - Total: 457
  - Density: 39.9/sq mi (15.4/km^{2})
- Time zone: UTC-8 (PST)
  - Summer (DST): UTC-7 (PDT)
- ZIP code: 93255
- Area codes: 442/760
- FIPS code: 06-53910
- GNIS feature ID: 1661150

Onyx (formerly, Scodie) is a census-designated place (CDP) in Kern County, California, United States. Onyx is located 3.5 miles (6 km) east-northeast of Weldon in the South Fork Valley at an elevation of 2,795 feet (852 m). The population was 457 at the 2020 census, down from 475 at the 2010 census.

== Geography ==
Onyx is located at 35°41′25″N 118°13′14″W.

According to the United States Census Bureau, the CDP has a total area of 11.5 square miles (30 km^{2}), over 99% of which is land.

== History ==
The place was originally called Scodie in honor of William Scodie, who opened a store in 1861. The first post office at Onyx opened in 1889.

== Demographics ==
Historical population
Census	Pop.	Note	%±
2000	476		—
2010	475		−0.2%
2020	457		−3.8%
U.S. Decennial Census; 1860–1870 1880-1890; 1900 1910 1920; 1930 1940 1950; 1960 1970 1980; 1990 2000 2010; 2020

Onyx first appeared as a census designated place in the 2000 U.S. census.

=== 2020 ===
Onyx CDP, California – Racial and ethnic composition Note: the US Census treats Hispanic/Latino as an ethnic category. This table excludes Latinos from the racial categories and assigns them to a separate category. Hispanics/Latinos may be of any race.
Race / Ethnicity (NH = Non-Hispanic)	Pop 2000	Pop 2010	Pop 2020	% 2000	% 2010	% 2020
White alone (NH)	425	402	339	89.29%	84.63%	74.18%
Black or African American alone (NH)	0	4	0	0.00%	0.84%	0.00%
Native American or Alaska Native alone (NH)	9	7	22	1.89%	1.47%	4.81%
Asian alone (NH)	0	0	0	0.00%	0.00%	0.00%
Native Hawaiian or Pacific Islander alone (NH)	0	0	0	0.00%	0.00%	0.00%
Other race alone (NH)	2	2	3	0.42%	0.42%	0.66%
Mixed race or Multiracial (NH)	18	30	32	3.78%	6.32%	7.00%
Hispanic or Latino (any race)	22	30	61	4.62%	6.32%	13.35%
Total	476	475	457	100.00%	100.00%	100.00%

The 2020 United States census reported that Onyx had a population of 457. The population density was 39.9 inhabitants per square mile (15.4/km^{2}). The racial makeup of Onyx was 360 (78.8%) White, 5 (1.1%) African American, 22 (4.8%) Native American, 0 (0.0%) Asian, 0 (0.0%) Pacific Islander, 16 (3.5%) from other races, and 54 (11.8%) from two or more races. Hispanic or Latino of any race were 61 persons (13.3%).

The whole population lived in households. There were 214 households, out of which 39 (18.2%) had children under the age of 18 living in them, 88 (41.1%) were married-couple households, 24 (11.2%) were cohabiting couple households, 42 (19.6%) had a female householder with no partner present, and 60 (28.0%) had a male householder with no partner present. 76 households (35.5%) were one person, and 42 (19.6%) were one person aged 65 or older. The average household size was 2.14. There were 122 families (57.0% of all households).

The age distribution was 63 people (13.8%) under the age of 18, 21 people (4.6%) aged 18 to 24, 89 people (19.5%) aged 25 to 44, 156 people (34.1%) aged 45 to 64, and 128 people (28.0%) who were 65 years of age or older. The median age was 54.9 years. For every 100 females, there were 103.1 males.

There were 265 housing units at an average density of 23.1 units per square mile (8.9 units/km^{2}), of which 214 (80.8%) were occupied. Of these, 140 (65.4%) were owner-occupied, and 74 (34.6%) were occupied by renters.

=== 2010 ===
At the 2010 census Onyx had a population of 475. The population density was 41.2 inhabitants per square mile (15.9/km^{2}). The racial makeup of Onyx was 406 (85.5%) White, 4 (0.8%) African American, 9 (1.9%) Native American, 0 (0.0%) Asian, 0 (0.0%) Pacific Islander, 16 (3.4%) from other races, and 40 (8.4%) from two or more races. Hispanic or Latino of any race were 30 people (6.3%).

The whole population lived in households, no one lived in non-institutionalized group quarters and no one was institutionalized.

There were 214 households, 40 (18.7%) had children under the age of 18 living in them, 89 (41.6%) were opposite-sex married couples living together, 19 (8.9%) had a female householder with no husband present, 13 (6.1%) had a male householder with no wife present. There were 13 (6.1%) unmarried opposite-sex partnerships, and 1 (0.5%) same-sex married couples or partnerships. 82 households (38.3%) were one person and 44 (20.6%) had someone living alone who was 65 or older. The average household size was 2.22. There were 121 families (56.5% of households); the average family size was 2.97.

The age distribution was 82 people (17.3%) under the age of 18, 28 people (5.9%) aged 18 to 24, 68 people (14.3%) aged 25 to 44, 184 people (38.7%) aged 45 to 64, and 113 people (23.8%) who were 65 or older. The median age was 51.4 years. For every 100 females, there were 98.7 males. For every 100 females age 18 and over, there were 98.5 males.

There were 295 housing units at an average density of 25.6 per square mile, of the occupied units 154 (72.0%) were owner-occupied and 60 (28.0%) were rented. The homeowner vacancy rate was 8.8%; the rental vacancy rate was 14.3%. 343 people (72.2% of the population) lived in owner-occupied housing units and 132 people (27.8%) lived in rental housing units.

=== 2000 ===
At the 2000 census, the median household income was $16,058 and the median family income was $29,583. Males had a median income of $31,818 versus $13,438 for females. The per capita income for the CDP was $9,370. About 25.7% of families and 34.7% of the population were below the poverty line, including 52.1% of those under age 18 and none of those age 65 or over.

== Images ==
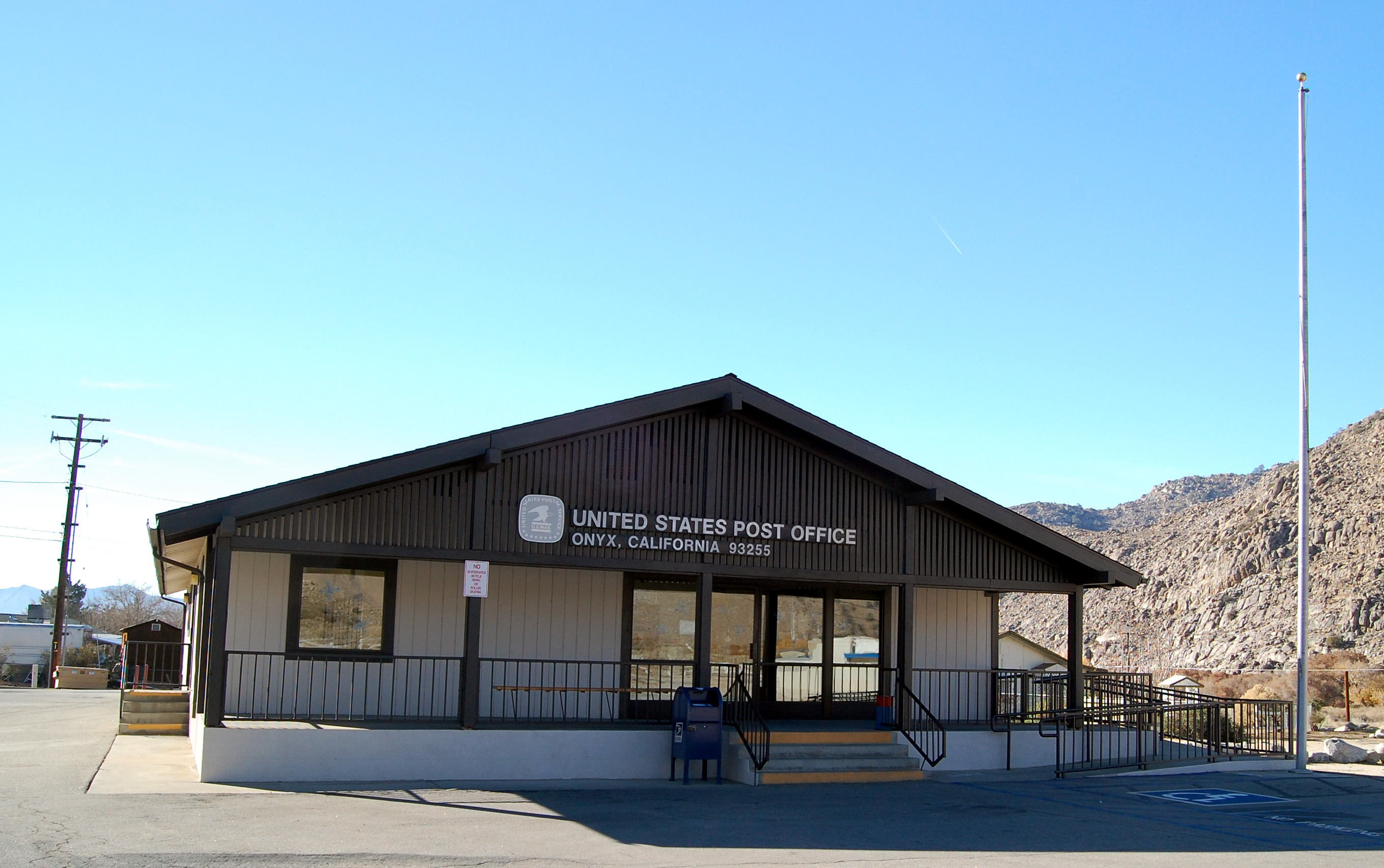
Onyx California post office.

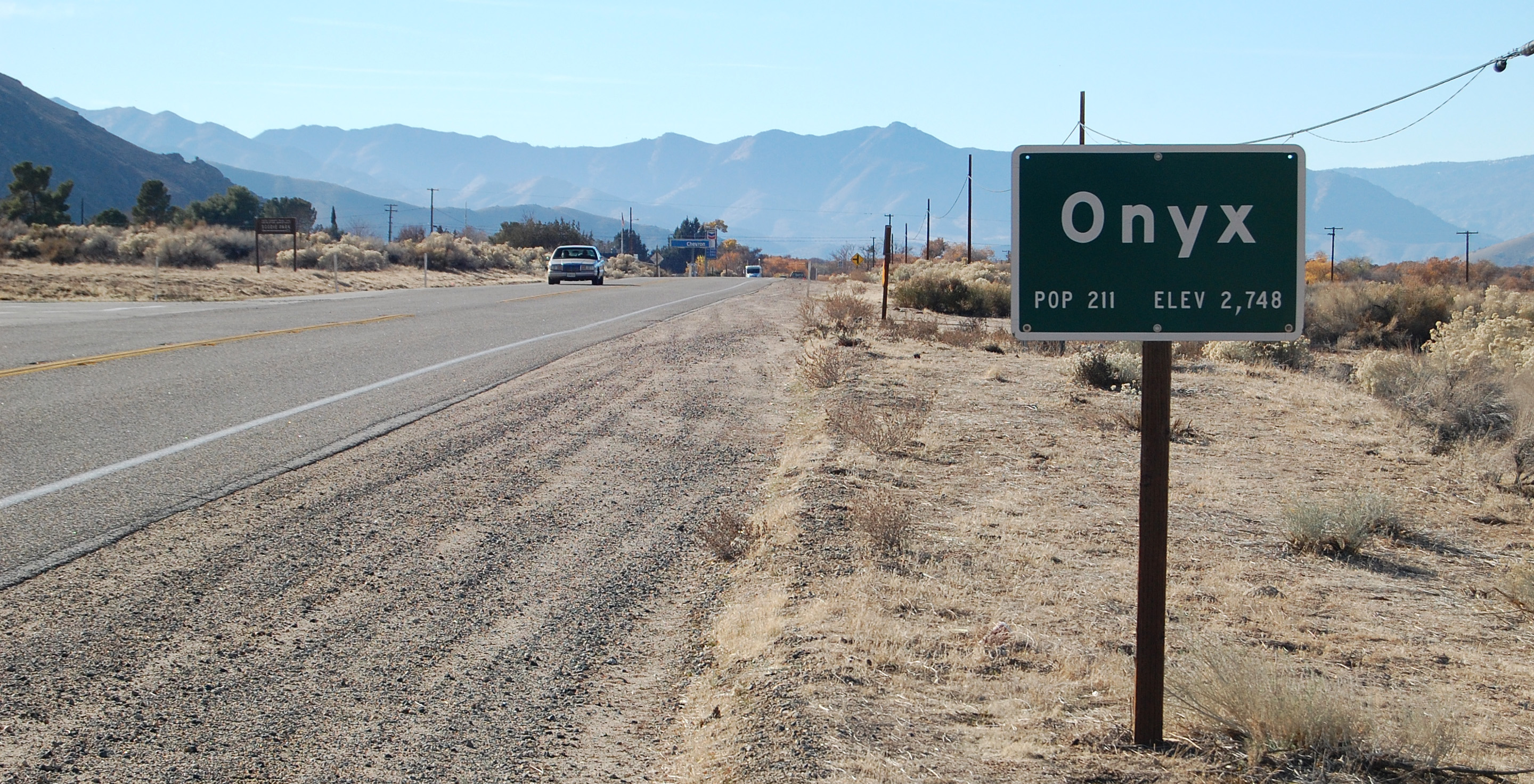
CalTrans guide sign along State Route 178.

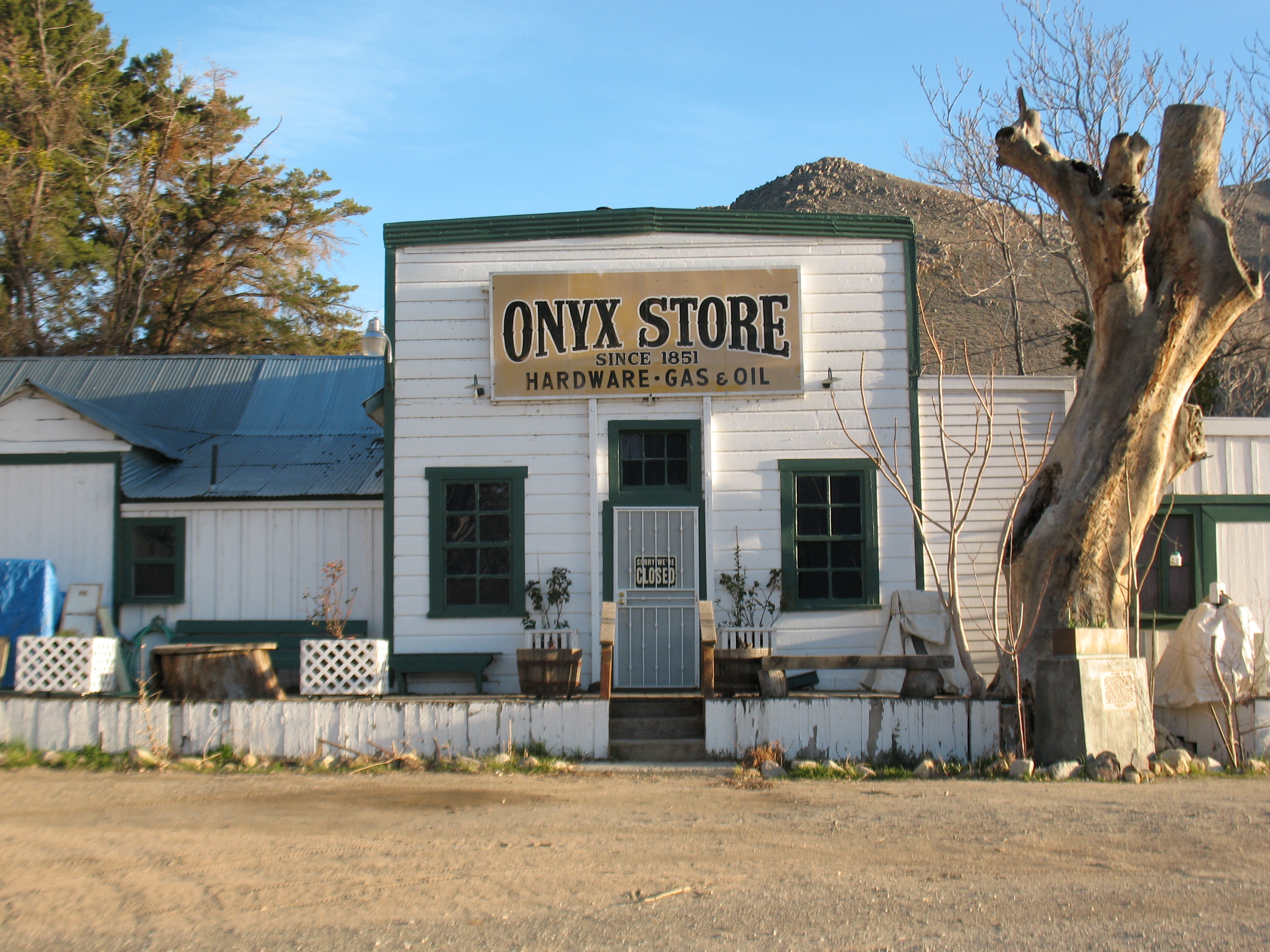
The Onyx store, Since 1851.
