= Weldon, California =

Weldon
- Unincorporated Community; Census Designated Place
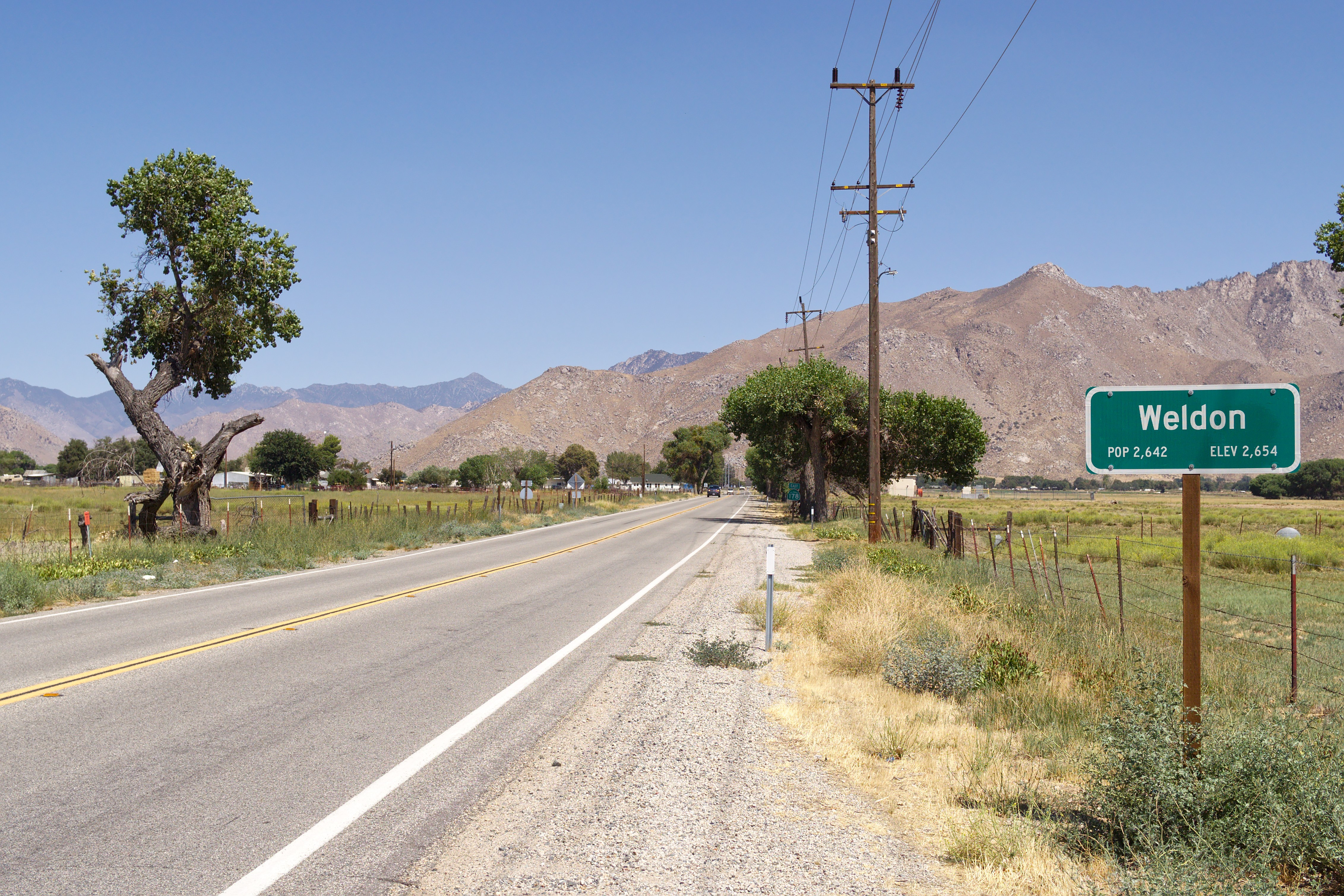

- Location in Kern County and the state of California

- Location in the United States
- Coordinates: 35°39′57″N 118°17′25″W
- Country: United States
- State: California
- County: Kern

Government
  - State senator: Shannon Grove (R)
  - Assemblymember: Stan Ellis (R)
  - U. S. rep.: Vince Fong (R)

Area
  - Total: 26.815 sq mi (69.450 km^{2})
  - Land: 26.663 sq mi (69.058 km^{2})
  - Water: 0.151 sq mi (0.392 km^{2}) 0.56%
- Elevation: 2,654 ft (809 m)

Population (2020)
  - Total: 2,303
  - Density: 86.37/sq mi (33.35/km^{2})
- Time zone: UTC-8 (PST)
  - Summer (DST): UTC-7 (PDT)
- ZIP code: 93283
- Area codes: 442/760
- FIPS code: 06-83948
- GNIS feature ID: 0255860

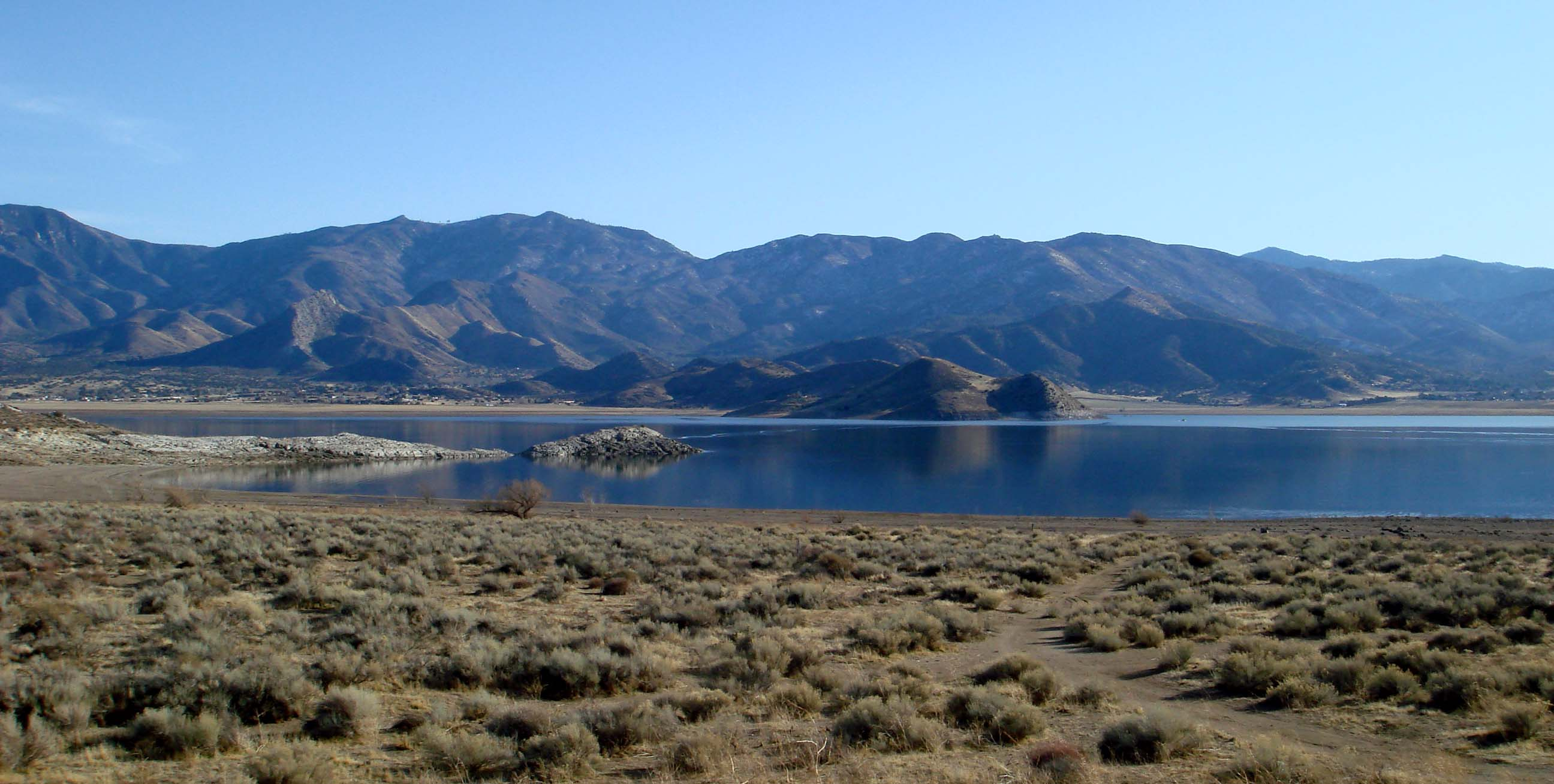
Weldon and neighboring South Lake sit on the southeast tip of the Lake Isabella, in the picture at far left

Weldon is a census-designated place (CDP) in Kern County, California, United States. It sits at the southeastern tip of Lake Isabella. Weldon is located 9 miles (14 km) east-southeast of Wofford Heights, at an elevation of 2,654 feet (809 m). The population was 2,303 at the 2020 census, down from 2,642 at the 2010 census.

== Geography ==
Weldon is located at 35°39′57″N 118°17′25″W.

According to the United States Census Bureau, the CDP has a total area of 26.8 square miles (69 km^{2}), over 99% of which is land.

== History ==
The Weldon post office opened in 1871. The name honors William B. Weldon, a cattle rancher. Camp Leonard, a temporary army camp, was established at Weldon in 1863.

The 1941 western film Doomed Caravan was partially filmed in Weldon. Other movies filmed here include Borderland (1937), In Old Mexico (1938) and Hidden Gold (1940).

== Demographics ==
Historical population
Census	Pop.	Note	%±
2000	2,387		—
2010	2,642		10.7%
2020	2,303		−12.8%
U.S. Decennial Census; 1860–1870 1880-1890; 1900 1910 1920; 1930 1940 1950; 1960 1970 1980; 1990 2000 2010; 2020

Weldon first appeared as a census designated place in the 2000 U.S. census formed out of a portion of the deleted South Lake CDP.

=== Racial and ethnic composition ===
Weldon CDP, California – Racial and ethnic composition Note: the US Census treats Hispanic/Latino as an ethnic category. This table excludes Latinos from the racial categories and assigns them to a separate category. Hispanics/Latinos may be of any race.
Race / Ethnicity (NH = Non-Hispanic)	Pop 2000	Pop 2010	Pop 2020	% 2000	% 2010	% 2020
White alone (NH)	2,073	2,269	1,803	86.85%	85.88%	78.29%
Black or African American alone (NH)	10	5	7	0.42%	0.19%	0.30%
Native American or Alaska Native alone (NH)	79	62	58	3.31%	2.35%	2.52%
Asian alone (NH)	11	11	25	0.46%	0.42%	1.09%
Native Hawaiian or Pacific Islander alone (NH)	3	1	3	0.13%	0.04%	0.13%
Other race alone (NH)	4	1	1	0.17%	0.04%	0.04%
Mixed race or Multiracial (NH)	58	76	149	2.43%	2.88%	6.47%
Hispanic or Latino (any race)	149	217	257	6.24%	8.21%	11.16%
Total	2,387	2,642	2,303	100.00%	100.00%	100.00%

=== 2020 census ===
As of the 2020 census, Weldon had a population of 2,303. The population density was 86.4 inhabitants per square mile (33.4/km^{2}). The racial makeup was 82.8% White, 0.3% African American, 3.3% Native American, 1.2% Asian, 0.1% Pacific Islander, 2.0% from other races, and 10.2% from two or more races. Hispanic or Latino of any race were 11.2% of the population.

The whole population lived in households. 0.0% of residents lived in urban areas, while 100.0% lived in rural areas.

There were 1,062 households, out of which 19.9% included children under the age of 18, 35.9% were married-couple households, 7.9% were cohabiting couple households, 30.4% had a female householder with no spouse or partner present, and 25.8% had a male householder with no spouse or partner present. 36.8% of households were one person, and 21.4% had one person aged 65 or older. The average household size was 2.17. There were 597 families (56.2% of all households).

The age distribution was 16.9% under the age of 18, 4.1% aged 18 to 24, 20.0% aged 25 to 44, 29.7% aged 45 to 64, and 29.3% who were 65 years of age or older. The median age was 53.9 years. For every 100 females, there were 103.4 males, and for every 100 females age 18 and over, there were 103.1 males.

There were 1,443 housing units at an average density of 54.1 units per square mile (20.9 units/km^{2}), of which 1,062 (73.6%) were occupied and 381 (26.4%) were vacant. The homeowner vacancy rate was 5.9% and the rental vacancy rate was 10.2%. Of the occupied units, 75.5% were owner-occupied and 24.5% were occupied by renters.

=== Income and poverty ===
In 2023, the US Census Bureau estimated that the median household income was $27,353, and the per capita income was $24,896. About 30.9% of families and 31.7% of the population were below the poverty line.

=== 2010 census ===
At the 2010 census Weldon had a population of 2,642. The population density was 98.6 inhabitants per square mile (38.1/km^{2}). The racial makeup of Weldon was 2,375 (89.9%) White, 5 (0.2%) African American, 82 (3.1%) Native American, 11 (0.4%) Asian, 1 (0.0%) Pacific Islander, 53 (2.0%) from other races, and 115 (4.4%) from two or more races. Hispanic or Latino of any race were 217 people (8.2%).

The census reported that 2,636 people (99.8% of the population) lived in households, no one lived in non-institutionalized group quarters and 6 (0.2%) were institutionalized.

There were 1,167 households, 254 (21.8%) had children under the age of 18 living in them, 541 (46.4%) were opposite-sex married couples living together, 117 (10.0%) had a female householder with no husband present, 78 (6.7%) had a male householder with no wife present. There were 78 (6.7%) unmarried opposite-sex partnerships, and 18 (1.5%) same-sex married couples or partnerships. 351 households (30.1%) were one person and 179 (15.3%) had someone living alone who was 65 or older. The average household size was 2.26. There were 736 families (63.1% of households); the average family size was 2.74.

The age distribution was 484 people (18.3%) under the age of 18, 178 people (6.7%) aged 18 to 24, 443 people (16.8%) aged 25 to 44, 856 people (32.4%) aged 45 to 64, and 681 people (25.8%) who were 65 or older. The median age was 50.7 years. For every 100 females, there were 98.3 males. For every 100 females age 18 and over, there were 100.0 males.

There were 1,583 housing units at an average density of 59.1 per square mile, of the occupied units 901 (77.2%) were owner-occupied and 266 (22.8%) were rented. The homeowner vacancy rate was 4.2%; the rental vacancy rate was 7.8%. 1,923 people (72.8% of the population) lived in owner-occupied housing units and 713 people (27.0%) lived in rental housing units.
