= Pacific Heights (film) =

1990 film by John Schlesinger

- Theatrical release poster
- Directed by: John Schlesinger
- Written by: Daniel Pyne
- Produced by: Scott Rudin; William Sackheim
- Starring: Melanie Griffith; Matthew Modine; Michael Keaton; Mako; Laurie Metcalf
- Cinematography: Amir Mokri
- Edited by: Steven Ramirez; Mark Warner
- Music by: Hans Zimmer
- Production company: Morgan Creek Productions
- Distributed by: 20th Century Fox
- Release date: September 28, 1990
- Running time: 102 minutes
- Country: United States
- Language: English
- Budget: $18 million
- Box office: $55 million

Pacific Heights is a 1990 American neo noir psychological horror thriller film directed by John Schlesinger, written by Daniel Pyne, and starring Melanie Griffith, Matthew Modine, and Michael Keaton. Its plot follows a San Francisco couple who restore a Victorian home in Pacific Heights and unwittingly rent a studio apartment inside it to a psychopathic con artist.

Pacific Heights was released by 20th Century Fox in the United States on September 28, 1990. The film received mixed reviews from critics, but was a box-office success, grossing $55 million worldwide against an $18 million budget.

== Plot ==
Carter Hayes and Ann Miller are suddenly attacked and beaten by two men. After the men have gone, Hayes calmly tells Ann, "The worst part's over now...."

In San Francisco, couple Drake Goodman and Patty Palmer purchase a 19th-century Victorian house in the exclusive Pacific Heights neighborhood. They rent one of the building's two first-floor apartments to the Watanabes, a kindly Japanese couple. Soon after, Hayes visits to view the remaining vacant unit, driving an expensive 1987 Porsche 911 and carrying large amounts of cash, but is reluctant to undergo a credit check. He convinces Drake to waive the credit check in exchange for a list of references and an upfront payment of the first six months' rent, to be paid by wire transfer.

Before any of this money is paid, however, Hayes arrives unannounced and shuts himself in the apartment. As the days pass, Hayes' promised wire transfer fails to materialize. From inside the apartment, sounds of loud hammering and drilling are heard at all hours of the day and night; however, the door is seldom answered. When Drake finally attempts to enter Hayes' apartment, he finds that the locks have been changed. Drake cuts the electricity and heat to the apartment. Hayes summons the police, who side with Hayes and reprimand Drake.

Drake and Patty hire a lawyer, Stephanie MacDonald. The eviction case is thwarted by Drake's actions attempting to force Hayes out. Hayes, safe from eviction for the time being, infests the house with cockroaches, which prompts the Watanabes to move out and pushes Drake and Patty further into debt. The stress takes its toll on the couple; Drake drinks heavily and Patty suffers a miscarriage. Hayes visits the couple, supposedly to offer his condolences. An infuriated Drake attacks him and is arrested by the police, whom Hayes had already called to the scene in anticipation of an assault.

The assault allows Hayes to file a civil lawsuit against Drake. Unbeknownst to the couple, he assumes control of Drake's possessions and identity. Hayes also files a restraining order, which forces Drake from the building. Once Drake is gone, Hayes begins stalking and harassing Patty. When Drake tries to enter the home to check on Patty, Hayes confronts Drake and shoots him, then plants a crowbar at the scene to prevent any criminal charges.

While Drake is in the hospital, the eviction is finally handed down and authorities force entry into Hayes' apartment. By this time, however, Hayes has disappeared, and the apartment has been destroyed and stripped bare. Later, while cleaning out the destroyed apartment, Patty finds an old photograph of Hayes as a young boy. Written on the back is the name "James Danforth". She phones Bennett Fidlow, the Texas attorney whom Danforth had provided as a reference. Fidlow tells her that Danforth has a long history of wrongdoing and has been disowned by his family.

Patty travels to Danforth's last-known address, a condominium in Desert Spring. There she finds Ann, his girlfriend and previous co-conspirator who had earlier come looking for him in San Francisco. Ann tells Patty that Carter Hayes is the name of the property's former landlord, and that Danforth assumed Hayes' identity and took possession of the condominium after (the genuine) Hayes hired two thugs to carry out the assault on Hayes and Miller. Ann also shows Patty a postcard from Danforth, written on the letterhead of a hotel in Century City, which had just arrived the day before.

Patty tracks Danforth at the hotel, where he has checked in under Drake's name. Patty bluffs her way into his suite by posing as his wife, and while rummaging through his personal effects discovers he is using legal and financial documents in Drake's name. She calls Drake and tells him to cancel all of his credit cards and freeze the couple's joint bank account. She then places an exorbitant order for room service, which leads to Danforth being arrested.

Danforth is bailed out of prison by a wealthy widow, Florence Peters, whom he was vetting to be his next victim. Once out on bail, Danforth returns to San Francisco to seek revenge on Patty and Drake, unwilling to accept responsibility for his actions and blaming them for his desires being ruined forever. Upstairs, he bludgeons Drake with a golf club, then attacks Patty in the downstairs apartment where she is busy making repairs. A struggle ensues, and a badly wounded Drake makes his way into the crawl space between the basement and the first-floor apartment. He reaches through a hole in the floor and grabs Danforth by the ankle while Patty pushes him away, causing Danforth to lose his balance and fall backward, getting impaled on a water supply line and dying.

Some time later, Patty and Drake have put their newly repaired building up for sale and show the property to another couple. The story ends with the couple having a private discussion about making an offer of $825,000-$850,000, which is $75,000-$100,000 more than what Drake and Patty had originally paid for it.

== Cast ==
- Melanie Griffith as Patricia "Patty" Palmer
- Matthew Modine as Drake Goodman
- Michael Keaton as Carter Hayes / James Danforth
- Mako as Toshio Watanabe
- Nobu McCarthy as Mira Watanabe
- Laurie Metcalf as Stephanie MacDonald
- Carl Lumbly as Lou Baker
- Dorian Harewood as Dennis Reed
- Luca Bercovici as Greg
- Tippi Hedren as Florence Peters
- Sheila McCarthy as Liz Hamilton
- Guy Boyd as Warning Cop
- Jerry Hardin as Bennett Fidlow
- Dan Hedaya as Loan Officer
- James Staley as District Attorney Henry
- Miriam Margolyes as Realtor
- Luis Oropeza as Revilla
- F. William Parker as Judge Mitchell Black
- Nicholas Pryor as Hotel Front Office Manager Neil Spisak
- Tony Simotes as Desk Clerk Victor
- O-Lan Jones as Hotel Maid Patricia
- Seth Isler as Sergeant Bobby Amato
- Dabbs Greer as Mr. Thayer
- Florence Sundstrom as Mrs. Thayer
- Noel Evangelisti as Mrs. Smith
- Nick Rutherford as Child
- Tim Pulice as Younger Man
- Ray Hanis as Older Man
- Takayo Fischer as Bank Teller
- Tom Nolan as Al
- Daniel MacDonald as George
- J.P. Bumstead as 1st Deputy Sheriff
- Hal Landon Jr. as 2nd Deputy Sheriff
- Hy Anzell as Locksmith Manford Bagel
- Tracey Walter as Exterminator
- William Paterson as Mr. Hill
- D. W. Moffett as Bill
- Barbara Tyson as Amy
- Beverly D'Angelo (uncredited) as Ann Miller

== Production ==
=== Development ===
Screenwriter Daniel Pyne based the screenplay for Pacific Heights on several stories he had heard from actual landlords in San Francisco.

=== Filming ===
The story location for the film is the Pacific Heights area of San Francisco. However, the actual film location for Drake and Patty's house is in Potrero Hill in San Francisco, specifically at the corner of 19th and Texas Streets. Other portions of the film were shot in Palm Springs, California. Principal photography began on January 23, 1990. Additional filming took place on sets at Culver Studios in Culver City, California.

== Release ==
20th Century Fox released Pacific Heights theatrically on September 28, 1990, in 1,278 theaters in North America. A premiere was held several days prior, on September 24, 1990, at the Avco Cinema in Los Angeles.

=== Home media ===
The film was released on VHS by CBS/Fox Video on March 21, 1991. It was then released on DVD by Warner Home Video on August 31, 1999. It was released on Blu-ray by Sony Pictures Home Entertainment on July 23, 2019.

== Reception ==
=== Box office ===
The film opened with a gross of $7.1 million from 1,284 theaters, replacing Goodfellas atop the U.S. box office.

Pacific Heights grossed $29.4 million in the United States and Canada, and $26 million in other territories, for a worldwide total of $55 million.

=== Critical response ===
On the review aggregator website Rotten Tomatoes, 52% of 33 critics' reviews are positive. The website's consensus reads: "Michael Keaton certainly proves himself as an effective villain, but Pacific Heights sticks too closely to well-worn thriller conventions." Metacritic, which uses a weighted average, assigned the film a score of 55 out of 100, based on 25 critics, indicating "mixed or average" reviews. Audiences polled by CinemaScore gave the film an average grade of "B" on an A+ to F scale.

Janet Maslin of The New York Times characterized the film as "perhaps the first eviction thriller," writing that it "taps into a previously unexplored subject, the source of so much excitement and so many conversational gambits within young urban professional circles. It is, of course, real estate." Roger Ebert called the film "a horror film for yuppies", and said the script relied on too many horror clichés. Owen Gleiberman of Entertainment Weekly agreed, writing, "the actors are stranded with a perfunctory, deadwood script that's all concept and no follow-through." Desson Howe of The Washington Post summed up the film this way: "This is a yuppie conceit; this is not interesting to human beings." Hal Lipper of the Tampa Bay Times echoed this sentiment, noting that he felt Griffith and Modine's characters are "nearly as reprehensible" as Keaton's, and similarly to Ebert, described it as "yuppie horror" film.

Ted Mahar of The Oregonian praised the film, comparing to the works of Alfred Hitchcock and noting that it is "better than most of Hitchcock's post-Psycho output." Peter Travers of Rolling Stone also felt the film was derivative of the works of Hitchcock, albeit "jolting and hypnotic... thanks to fleet directing from John Schlesinger and a twisty script by Daniel Pyne."

Chris Hicks of the Deseret News was among the critics who praised the acting, especially of Keaton, and found enjoyment in having Patty getting her revenge on a man who had manipulated the law to wreck her dreams and hurt the man she loved. In contrast, The Washington Post's Howe criticized Modine's acting, remarking that as he "goes from clean cut boyfriend to arrested, frothing debtor in screen minutes, loses his cool so easily and maniacally, you wonder if he'll turn out to be the real psycho." Stephen Hunter of The Baltimore Sun was also critical of Modine's performance, deeming it "bland," but he conceded that the film is a "mordant thriller [that] has a nifty, original premise and an intriguing set of antagonists." Variety praised Griffith's performance in the film, as well as the screenwriting, though they noted that the film "loses its grip when it tips over into psycho-chiller territory."

This film was listed as No. 94 on Bravo's The 100 Scariest Movie Moments.

Daniel Pyne later reflected, " I learned my first commercial marketplace lesson, which was that I’d written almost a thriller. When Morgan Creek bought it, they decided they wanted it to be a thriller, through and through. So the ending became much more straightforward. But I still like it. I think it had a lot more depth than some of the critics saw in it. And it’s done reasonably well."

== TV series ==
A TV series adaptation was confirmed by Morgan Creek Entertainment in 2021 to be in the works with "a surprising and cheeky gender role reversal."

== See also ==
- List of films featuring home invasions

== Sources ==
- Muir, John Kenneth (2011). Horror Films of the 1990s. Jefferson, North Carolina: McFarland & Company. ISBN 978-0-786-48480-5.
- Niemann, Greg (2006). Palm Springs Legends: Creation of A Desert Oasis. San Diego, California: Sunbelt Publications. ISBN 978-0-932653-74-1.
