= Joe Walker Town, California =

Joe Walker Town
- Unincorporated community
- Location in California
- Coordinates: 35°25′20″N 118°29′35″W
- Country: United States
- State: California
- County: Kern County

Joe Walker Town is a former settlement in Kern County, California, United States. It was located in the Walker Basin near Joe Walker Mine. The place was named after Joe Walker (as was the mine and basin). At least 100 single miners lived in the town, along with 12 families. The town largely existed to support operations at the Joe Walker Mine.

== Joe Walker Mine ==
The Joe Walker gold mine was founded on 20 March 1866 by Hamp Williams, father of another Hamp Williams who discovered silver at Randsburg. Williams sold the mine for $2,000 to investors who could properly equip it. A 20-stamp mill was hauled in from San Francisco. The mine quickly proved to be one of the most profitable in the area, netting $12,000 in six days and a total production over its lifetime of $600,000. However, the mine began to flood faster than it could be pumped out, despite a Cornish engine being shipped in from England.

After several changes of ownership and attempts to restart operations, ending with senator John P. Jones of Nevada in 1873, the mine was mothballed. It was acquired by the Phoebe Hearst estate in lieu of a debt but remained unused for sixty years. It was bought by Tom Duffin in 1939 and reopened in 1941. However, flooding remained a problem and the mine was again abandoned. The mine is now used as a reservoir of water to irrigate crops.
