= Caliente, California =

Unincorporated community in California, United States

Caliente
- Unincorporated community
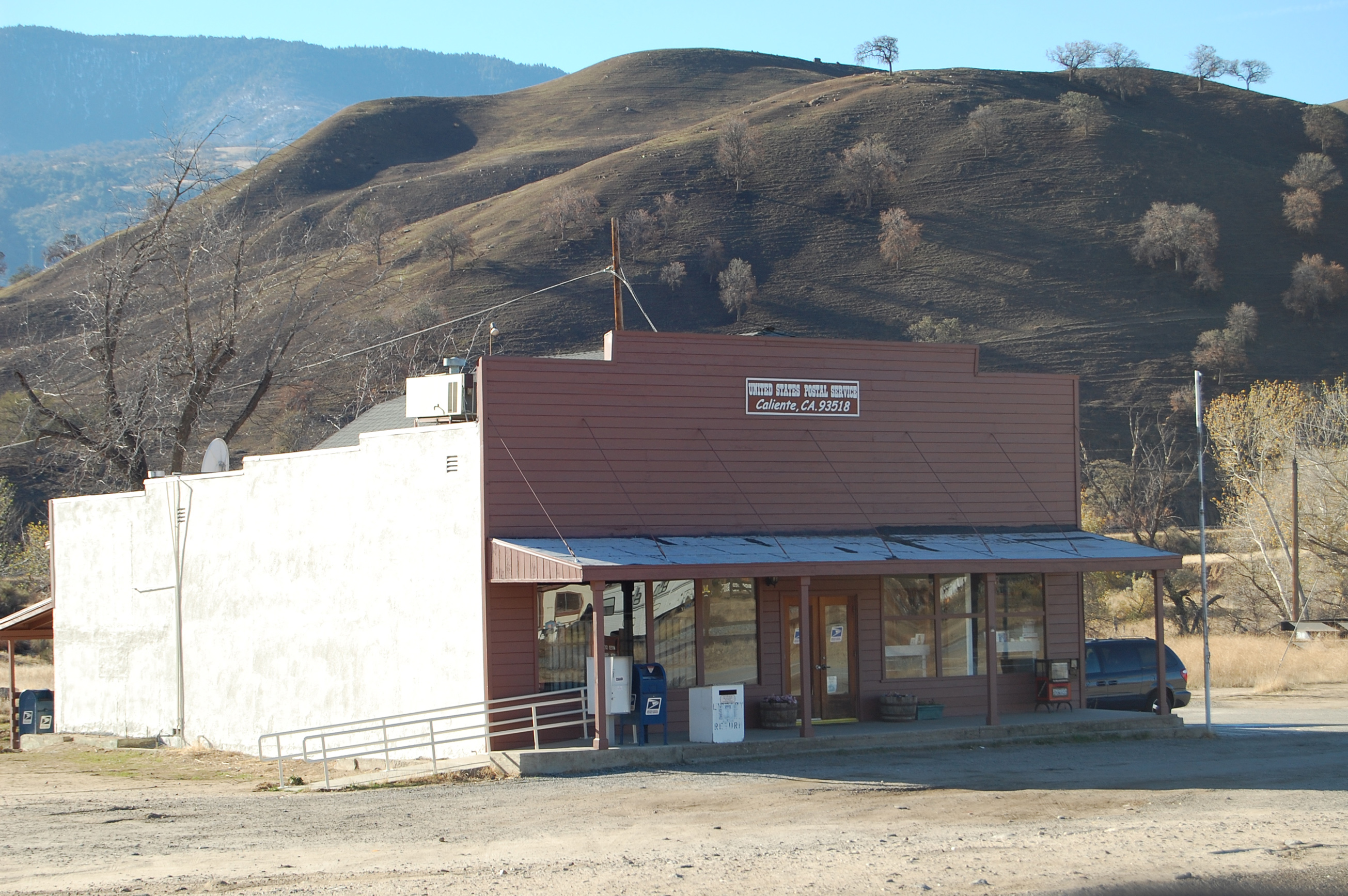

- Location in California Location within the United States
- Coordinates: 35°17′28″N 118°37′40″W
- Country: United States
- State: California
- County: Kern
- Elevation: 1,300 ft (400 m)

California Historical Landmark
- Reference no.: 757

Caliente (Spanish for "Hot") is an unincorporated community in Kern County, California, United States. It is located 22 miles (35 km) east-southeast of Bakersfield, at an elevation of 1,312 feet (400 m).

Caliente has a population of 1,019. Telephone numbers in Caliente follow the format (661) 867-xxxx and the ZIP Code is 93518. It is located south of a small community named Walker Basin in the same telephone exchange area.

== History ==
Established in the 1870s, Caliente was originally named Allens Camp for a cattle rancher and settler named Gabriel Allen. Later, the name Agua Caliente, coming from hot springs in the area, was proposed and may have been used. This name conflicted with the community of the same name in Sonoma County. With the railroad's arrival in 1875, the shortened name Caliente was adopted.

Caliente prospered during Southern Pacific Railroad's construction of Tehachapi Pass line. For a time, the Telegraph Stage Line and the Cerro Gordo Freighting Co. also ran through Caliente and its full-time population grew to 200. There were approximately 60 buildings, including 20 or more saloons.

The Caliente post office opened in 1875, closed in 1883, and was re-established in 1890. The Caliente General Store was remodeled in 1980 to house the post office which is still in operation today.

Bealville is a district about one mile (1.6 km) to the south toward SR58 and along Caliente-Bodfish Road. It is named for Edward Fitzgerald Beale who served in the US Army, and also as Superintendent of Indian Affairs for California and Nevada. He was also appointed as US Surveyor General of California. Beale established a home in this area about 1855. The location is now registered as California Historical Landmark #757

California Historical Landmark reads:

NO. 757 CALIENTE - Originally known as Allen's Camp after Gabriel Allen, who in the 1870s had a cabin and stock pasture near here, the settlement was named Caliente when railroad construction reached this point in April 1875. The town became a railroad terminal for about 16 months while a force of up to three thousand men, most of them Chinese, labored on the heavy railroad construction on the mountain.

== Today ==
The sound of diesel locomotives and railroad horns are present day and night. The community is along the track of the Union Pacific Railroad, Mojave Subdivision. The track loops around the post office as it winds through the local hills. Trains climb toward the Tehachapi summit eastbound or descend toward Bakersfield if westbound.

California State Route 58 is about two driving miles south of Caliente.

== Images ==
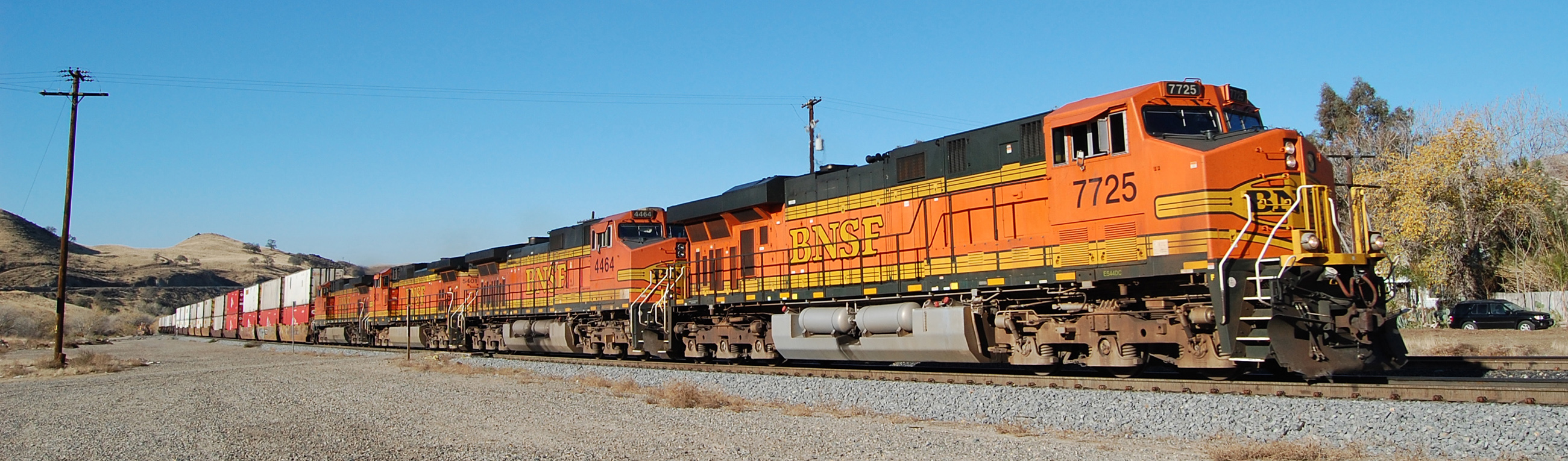
A BNSF freight passing through Caliente climbs eastbound toward Mojave, California.

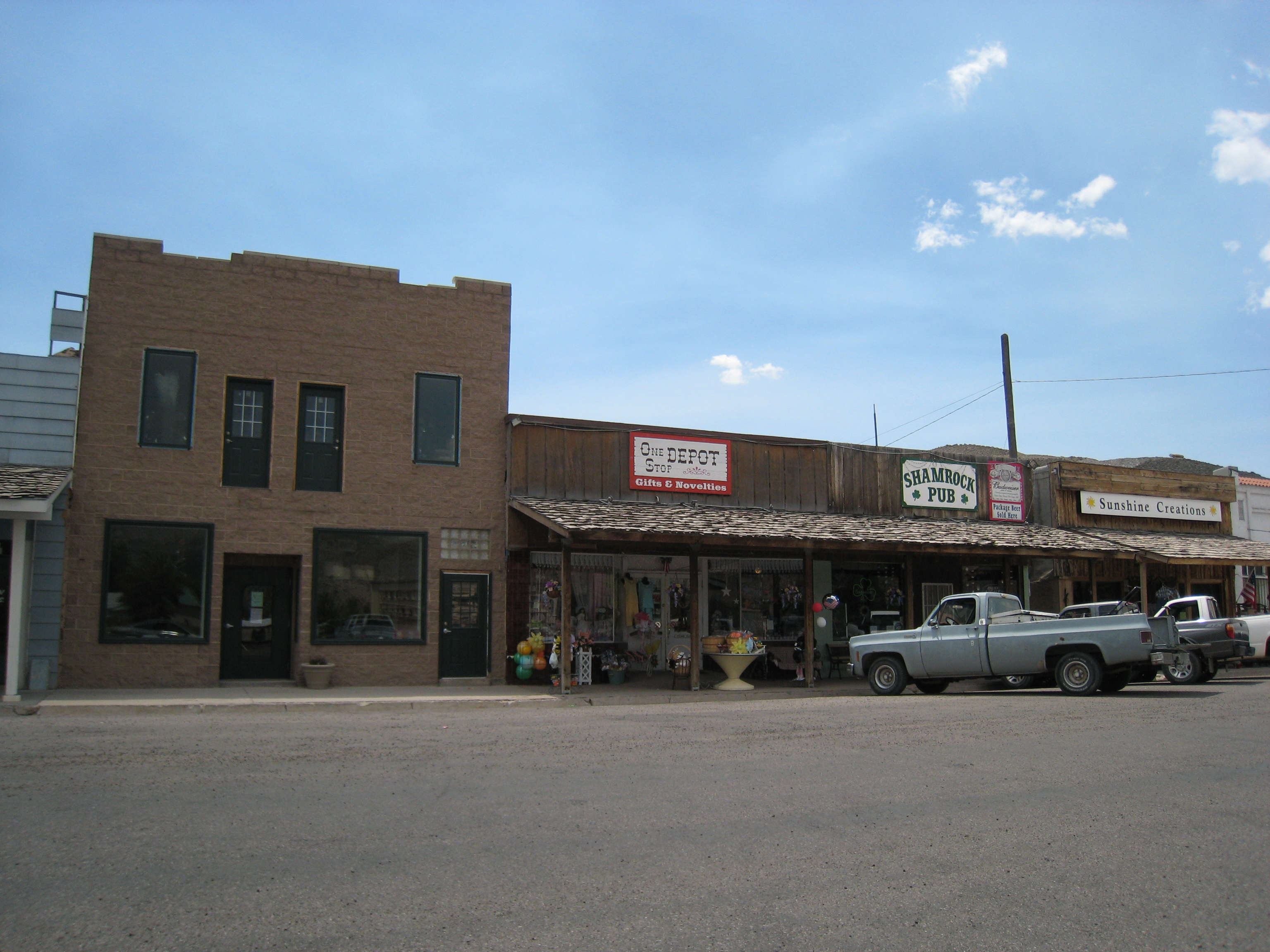
Storefront in Caliente

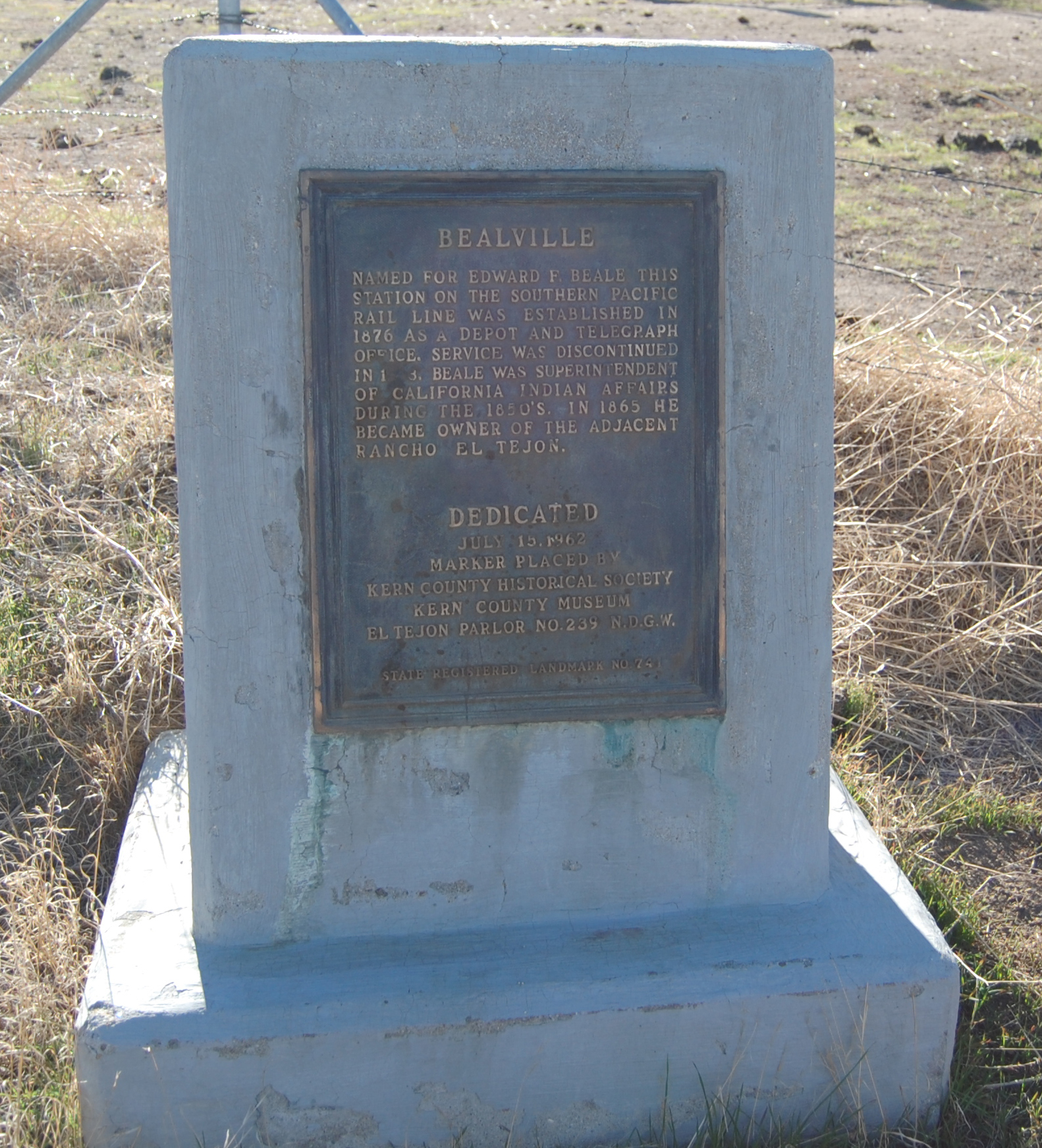
Bealville marker along Caliente-Bodfish Rd.

== See also ==
- Keene, California
- Tehachapi Loop
- California Historical Landmarks in Kern County
- California Historical Landmark
