= Indian Wells =

Indian Wells may refer to:

== Places ==
- Indian Wells, Arizona, community within the Navajo Nation
- Indian Wells, California, city in Riverside County
- Indian Wells, Kern County, California, community in Kern County
- Indian Wells (Kern County, California), a California Historical Landmark
- Indian Wells, Imperial County, California, a former settlement, and stage station, in Imperial County
- Indian Wells Valley, valley in the Mojave Desert of California

== Others ==
- Indian Wells Open, annual tennis tournament held in Indian Wells, California
- Indian Wells (musician), Italian electronic musician
