= Desert Spring =

Desert Spring may refer to:

- Desert Spring, California, a former settlement in Kern County, California
- Operation Desert Spring, an operation in Kuwait by the United States

== See also ==
- Desert Springs (disambiguation)
- Desert Hot Springs
