= Woody, California =

Unincorporated community and Census Designated Place in California, US

Woody
- Unincorporated community Census-designated place
- Location in California Woody (the United States)
- Coordinates: 35°42′29″N 118°48′52″W
- Country: United States
- State: California
- County: Kern

Area
  - Total: 4.036 sq mi (10.45 km^{2})
  - Land: 4.036 sq mi (10.45 km^{2})
  - Water: 0 sq mi (0 km^{2})
- Elevation: 2,251 ft (686 m)

Population (2020)
  - Total: 108
  - Density: 26.8/sq mi (10.3/km^{2})
- Time zone: UTC-8 (PST)
  - Summer (DST): UTC-7 (PDT)
- ZIP codes: 93287
- GNIS feature ID: 2804433

Woody (formerly, Weringdale) is an unincorporated community and census-designated place (CDP) in Kern County, California, United States. It is located in the foothills of the Greenhorn Mountains, 25 miles (40 km) north-northeast of Bakersfield at an elevation of 2,251 feet (686 m). As of the 2020 census, Woody had a population of 108.

== History ==
Woody was named after Sparrell Walter Woody, who homesteaded with his wife at the foot of Blue Mountain in 1862. The Woody School District was founded in 1873 and a post office opened in 1889. Copper was discovered near Woody in 1891 by Joseph Weringer, who founded the Greenback Mine and built the nine-room Weringdale Hotel. Quartz gold was found on Blue Mountain in 1894, and the population of the town, then known as Weringdale, grew to over a hundred. By the time the townsite was subdivided by Weringer in 1909, the community's name had reverted to Woody.

A small ranch town, the total population of Woody has changed little since the mid-1890s. The post office, fire department, and Blue Mountain Graveyard are situated on the outskirts of town. There is also an elementary school and a community hall where the Woody residents have gatherings and events. There used to be a restaurant/ bar in Woody, but financial problems caused it to close.

A local legend states that the outlaw Joaquin Murrieta once had a cave/hideout in the area that he used while on the run.

== Mountain House station ==
Just outside of Woody is California Historical Landmark number 589, the Mountain House Station. The spot was a Butterfield Overland Mail Stagecoach stop and station from 1858 to 1861. The location of the Mountain House station was on Dry Creek, on Bakersfield-Glenville Roads about 6.3 miles from Woody.

== Demographics ==
Historical population
Census	Pop.	Note	%±
2020	108		—
U.S. Decennial Census; 1860–1870 1880-1890; 1900 1910 1920; 1930 1940 1950; 1960 1970 1980; 1990 2000 2010; 2020

Woody first appeared as a census designated place in the 2020 U.S. census.

=== 2020 Census ===
Woody CDP, California – Racial and ethnic composition Note: the US Census treats Hispanic/Latino as an ethnic category. This table excludes Latinos from the racial categories and assigns them to a separate category. Hispanics/Latinos may be of any race.
Race / Ethnicity (NH = Non-Hispanic)	Pop 2020	% 2020
White alone (NH)	78	72.22%
Black or African American alone (NH)	0	0.00%
Native American or Alaska Native alone (NH)	6	5.56%
Asian alone (NH)	1	0.93%
Native Hawaiian or Pacific Islander alone (NH)	1	0.93%
Other race alone (NH)	0	0.00%
Mixed race or Multiracial (NH)	9	8.33%
Hispanic or Latino (any race)	13	12.04%
Total	108	100.00%

== See also ==
- Glennville Adobe a California Historical Landmark in Woody
- California Historical Landmarks in Kern County
- California Historical Landmark
