= Shafter Cotton Research Station =

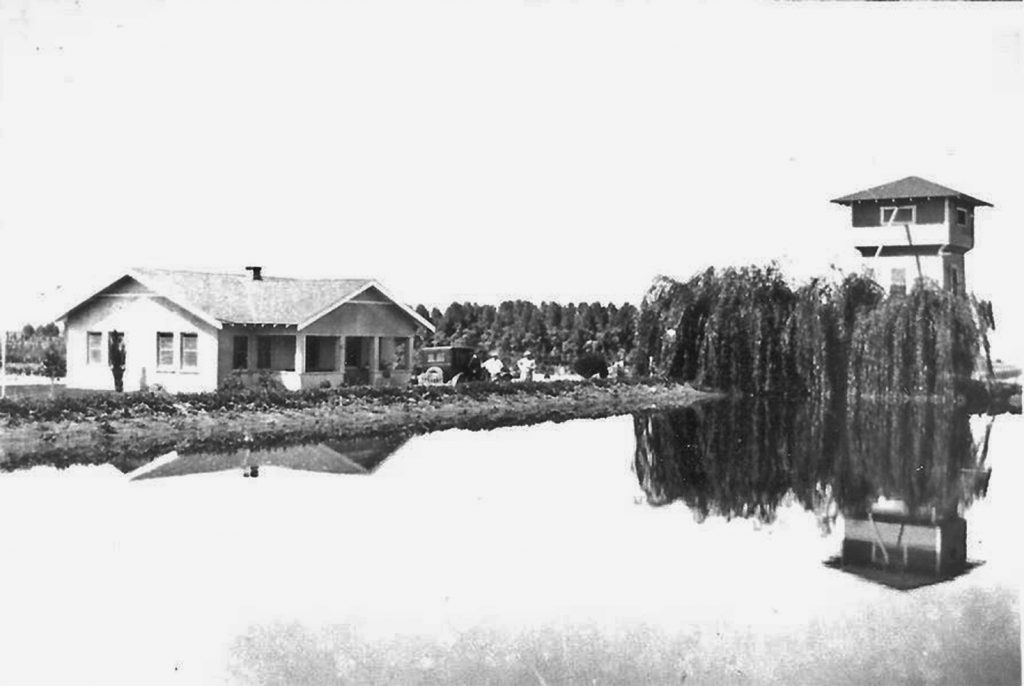
- Shafter Cotton Research Station in 1922
- Interactive map of Shafter Cotton Research Station
- 35.53245°N 119.278067°W
- Location: 17053 Shafter Avenue, Shafter, Kern County, California

History
- Built: 1922

California Historical Landmark
- Official name: Shafter Cotton Research Station
- Designated: March 3, 1997
- Reference no.: 1022
- Shafter Research Station
- U.S. National Register of Historic Places
- Location within California Location within the United States
- Nearest city: Shafter, California
- Area: 20 acres (8.1 ha)
- Built: 1922
- NRHP reference No.: 97001211
- Added to NRHP: October 17, 1997

The Shafter Cotton Research Station is a California Historical Landmark, located at 17053 Shafter Avenue just north of the town of Shafter, California. Built in 1922 by the U.S. Department of Agriculture (USDA), the station became California Historical Landmark No. 1022 on March 3, 1997. That same year, on October 17, the station was added to the National Register of Historic Places.

In accordance with the Hatch Act of 1887, which provided funding of agricultural science in the U.S., the Shafter Cotton Research Station was built to provide California with high-quality cotton. The first director was W.B. Camp, who moved to California from South Carolina in 1917. Camp studied agronomy at Clemson University and also worked in the USDA Cotton Breeding Office. Along with the USDA, Camp worked to come up with strong cotton fabric to be used in World War I plane wings. Camp and Shafter Cotton Research Station worked with Egyptian Pima cotton and later Acala #8 cotton, named after Acala, Texas.

Shafter Cotton Research Station changed from a USDA research station to a private one in June 2012. The San Joaquin Valley Quality Cotton Growers Association now runs the facility. With this change, the Shafter Research Station now works other crops including orchard crops. Today the facility consists of a 20-acre campus with 20 buildings, and 60 acres of experimental crops.

- The California Historical Landmark state plaque reads:

NO. 1022 SHAFTER COTTON RESEARCH STATION - The Shafter Cotton Research Station, established here in 1922 by the U.S. Department of Agriculture, developed the "Acala" varieties which were exceptionally well suited to the San Joaquin Valley. The quality of the Acala cottons and the marketing advantage of the one-variety cotton district, created in 1925, resulted in premium cottons with a worldwide demand. Through the continued vision and cooperative efforts of growers and researchers, production of Acala cotton became one of California's largest agricultural enterprises.

== See also ==
- California Historical Landmarks in Kern County
- California Historical Landmark
- History of agriculture in California.
