= Glennville Adobe =

California Historical Landmark

- Glennville Adobe in 1940
- Location: 7977 Highway 155, Woody, California, in Kern County, California
- Coordinates: 35°43′36″N 118°42′03″W

California Historical Landmark
- Official name: Glennville adobe
- Designated: October 17, 1951
- Reference no.: 495

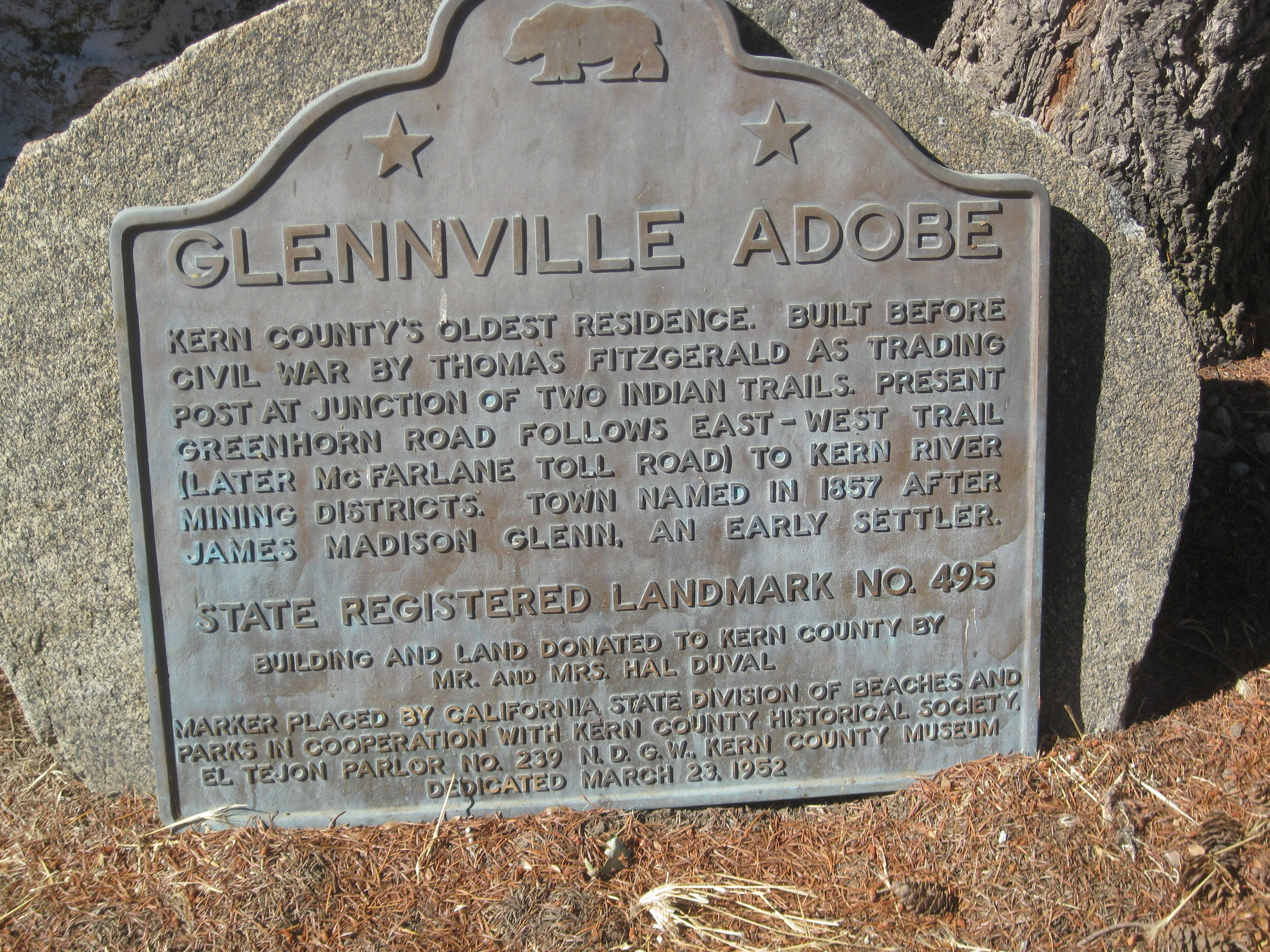
Glennville Adobe Historical Marker

The Glennville Adobe is a California Historical Landmark number 495 in Kern County, California. The house is the oldest in Kern County, built about 1858. The adobe became a California State Historical Landmark No. 495 on October 17, 1951. The house is located at 7977 Highway 155, Woody, California. The house was built by Thomas Fitzgerald. Fitzgerald owned a trading post nearby on an Indian trail when he built the adobe brick house. Since the 1950s the Glennville Adobe has been used as a Fire Department substation. Woody is a small town 7 miles west of the larger town of Glennville, California, north of Bakersfield, California.

- California State Historical Landmark reads:

NO. 495 GLENNVILLE ADOBE - This is Kern County's oldest residence, built before the Civil War by Thomas Fitzgerald as a trading post at the junction of two Indian trails. The present Greenhorn Road follows the east-west trail (later the McFarland Toll Road) to the Kern River mining districts. The town was named in 1857 after James Madison Glenn, an early settler.

== See also ==
- California Historical Landmarks in Kern County
- California Historical Landmark
