= Bealville, California =

Unincorporated community in California, United States

Bealville
- Unincorporated community
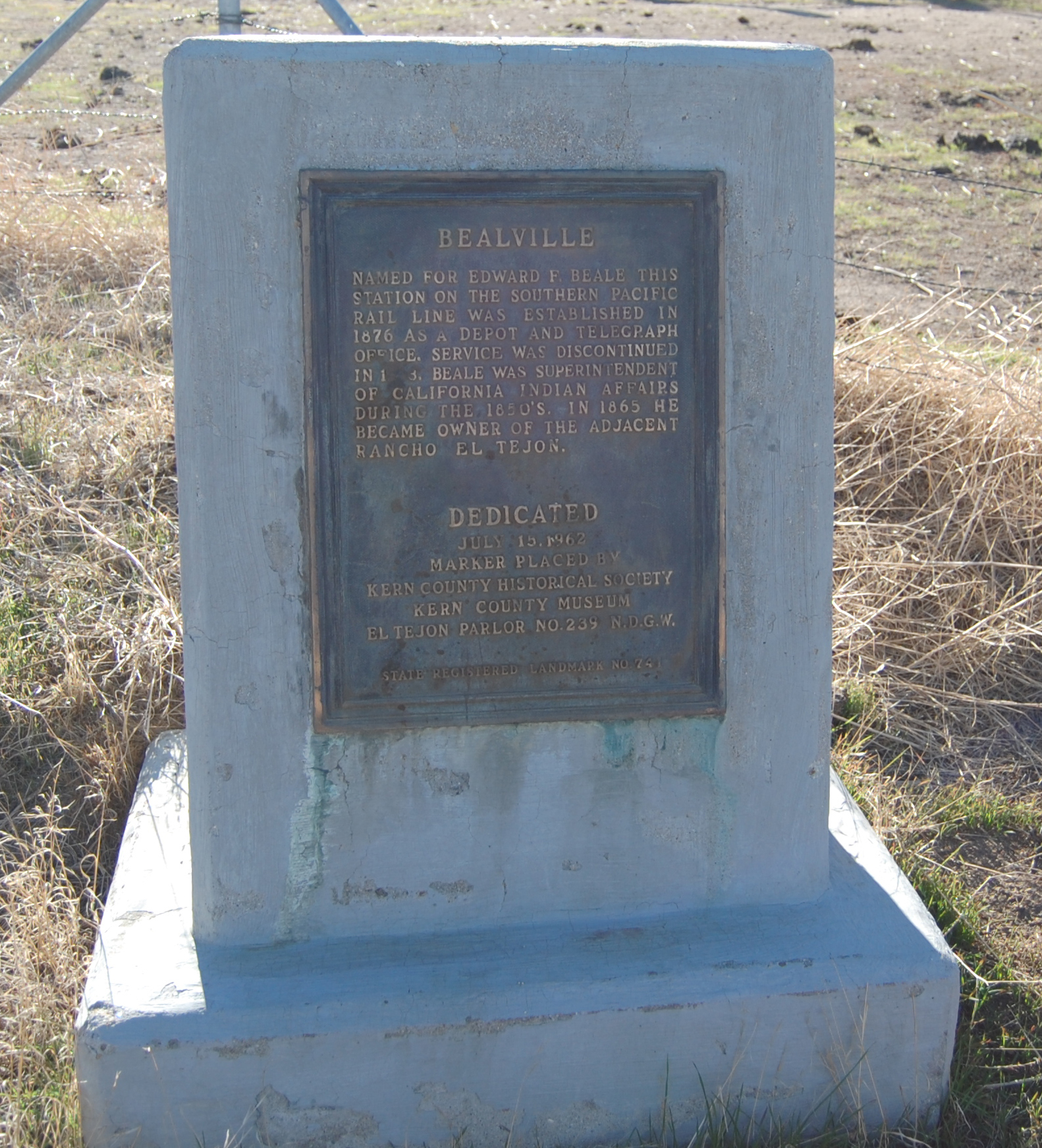
- Historic marker at Bealville

- Location in California Bealville (the United States)
- Coordinates: 35°16′20″N 118°37′34″W
- Country: United States
- State: California
- County: Kern
- Elevation: 1,811 ft (552 m)

California Historical Landmark
- Reference no.: 741

Bealville is an unincorporated community in Kern County, California, United States. It is located on the Union Pacific Railroad, (formerly Southern Pacific Railroad) 1.25 miles (2 km) south of Caliente, at an elevation of 1,811 feet (552 m). The area was named after Edward Fitzgerald Beale, who owned the adjacent Rancho El Tejon.

The Southern Pacific Railroad established the Bealville depot and telegraph office on the railroad in 1876 and it remained in service until 1913. A post office operated at Bealville from 1879 to 1881. The town is now registered as California Historical Landmark #741.

California Historical Landmark reads:

NO. 741 BEALVILLE - Edward Fitzgerald Beale, serving under Commodore Stockton in 1846, established his home here on Rancho le Libre in 1855. He also engaged in mining and became Superintendent of Indian Affairs for California and Nevada, and Minister to Vienna.

== See also ==
- California Historical Landmarks in Kern County
- California Historical Landmark
