= History of agriculture in California =

The history of agriculture in California began with California's indigenous peoples and was radically altered by colonization and statehood. Throughout its history agriculture has formed an important part of the state's economy. California has led the nation in farm production sales since 1948.

== Pre-1850 ==
=== Indigenous Californian Land Management ===
Peake & Fleure 1927 propose that many crop wild relatives and a climate with both a rainy season and a dry season are necessary for an area to become a center of agriculture. Before human arrival a wide variety of crop wild relatives were already found there – and although most of the land has a monotonously desert or near-desert rain supply – some areas have a climate type called Mediterranean. Archaeologists have uncovered seeds from sunflowers and marsh elder that have been altered by the domestication process.

Since initial contact between Europeans and Indigenous American peoples, the topic of Native American agriculture has been debated. While agriculture in pre-contact California certainly did not fit into the Western definition of agriculture, the keen stewardship of California's natural ecosystem by Indigenous Californians to achieve the best possible output of resources is "agricultural," with California's ecosystems acting as a large, unbounded agricultural site. Because of this difference in ideology, agricultural practices in pre-contact California often took a different form than those of Europe. However, the concept of Indigenous Californians as hunter-gatherers has shifted over time. While Native Californians did not have domesticated crops or animals, their knowledge and methods of land stewardship and cultivation allowed them to thrive successfully on the California land. Thus, Indigenous Californians are now considered proto-agriculturists.

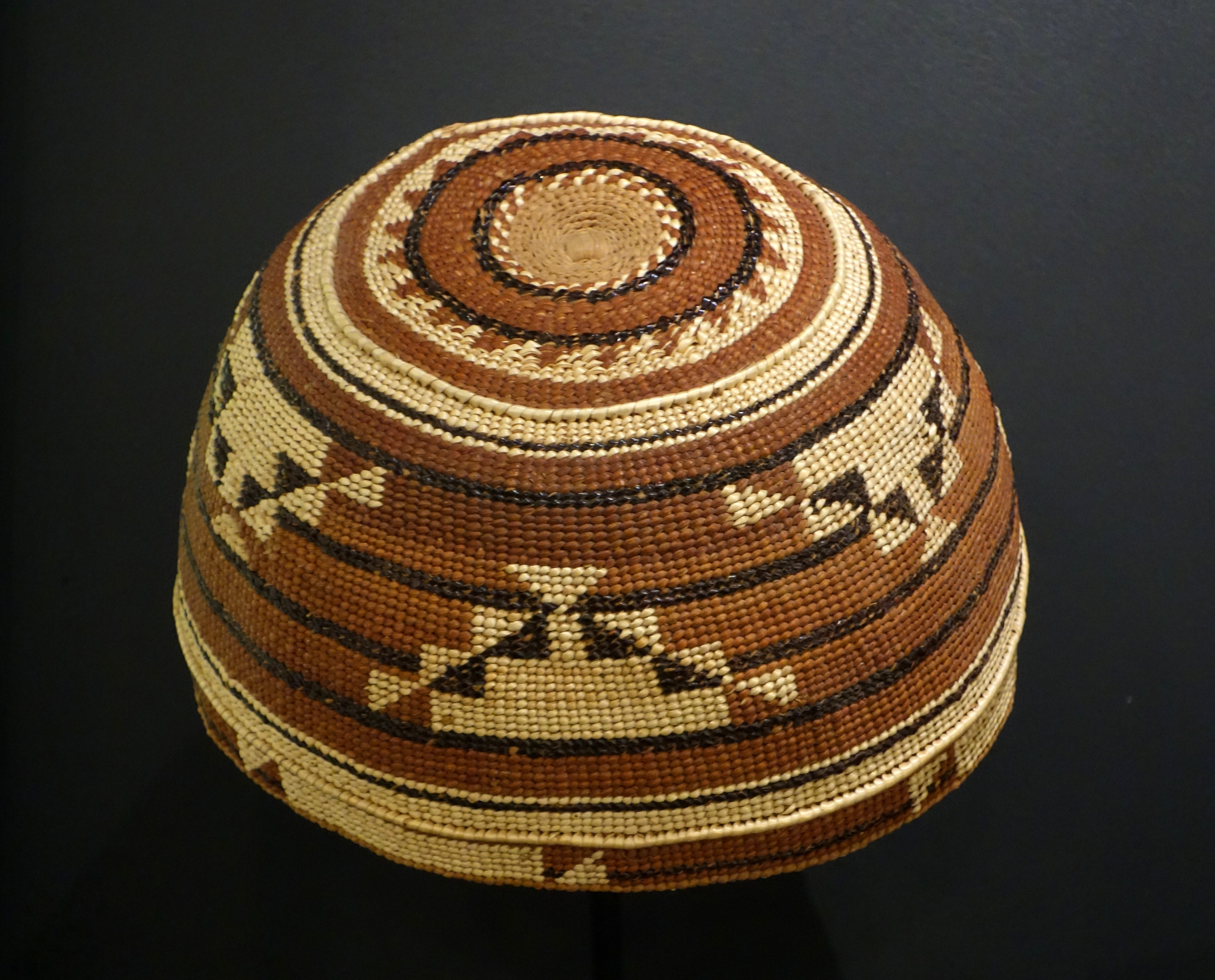
A basket cap made by the Karuk, Yurok, or Hupa peoples, using stems of plants that would have been harvested as a result of cultural burning.

Some California hunter-gatherer tribes, including the Owens Valley Paiute, developed irrigation. In addition, the Kumeyaay created water and erosion management systems where rocks, boulders, and plants were placed on slopes to create a drainage system that would keep the soil wet for planting. Plants alongside the system served as food and for medicinal purposes; thus, the system would often be maintained and repaired when needed.

Native Californians were skilled at gathering materials from plants at all times of the year, allowing the consistent gathering of materials from any and all local plants. Depending on when various plants—including succulents, flowers, and trees—bloomed or became ripe, different aspects of the plant could be accessed or harvested by Native California peoples.

Native Californians also developed strategies when it came to competing with animals for resources. The Kashaya Pomo, for example, timed their harvest of dogwood to be before insects and worms would be able to access the inner parts of the plant. Indigenous Californians also developed strategies for acquiring black oak acorns directly from tree branches using a long pole, increasing harvest yields that would otherwise have been disturbed by animals.

Black oak acorn harvests were further increased by cultural burning, which stimulated acorn growth and increased biodiversity in the area. Cultural burning was commonly practiced throughout California to maintain a healthy landscape that produced quality resources, as the Karuk, Yurok, and Hupa peoples all regularly burned areas of bear grass and California hazelnut and to encourage the growth of stronger stems that could be used for basketry. The Pomo indigenous peoples of California utilized intentional cutting of Carex rhizomes. When cut, the rhizomes regrew straight, which the Pomo utilized extensively in the weaving of baskets.

Some researchers have suggested that the oak trees are going through a population collapse. Citing the lack of Native American silviculture as a large factor to the decline in Oak, Walnut, and possibly even redwoods. Opponents of this theory have argued that the change in climate due to global warming and modern human industrial behavior as the culprit behind the decline.

Native Californians practiced cultural burning and practiced pruning, coppicing, sowing, and weeding to maintain the land. These management methods mimicked the natural disturbances plants often experienced such as annual flooding and lightning fires. These practices kept the shrubs that were used for basketry from re-entering the adult stage; therefore, keeping the branches of the shrubs pliable for basketry and free from insects, mosses, and lichens.

Evidence of agricultural tools is sparse, however the Yuma of the lower Colorado River were documented utilizing various wooden tools to manage the plants. These tools may have been made out of stone or other materials but none have been found. The tools found were constructed from wood and each tool served a specific purpose. For example, a special planting stick was used only to plant teparies. Other types of sticks such as side-scraper hoes and regular planting sticks were used for weeding, pruning, digging and planting.

These methods of management also created many Indigenous foodways. Indigenous Californians gathered and processed a variety of resources, such as nuts and seed from gray pin and sugar pine trees. After collecting these resources, Indigenous Northern Californians would then process the nuts by either grinding or steaming the nuts. Various foods such as flour and butter were created from these processing methods.

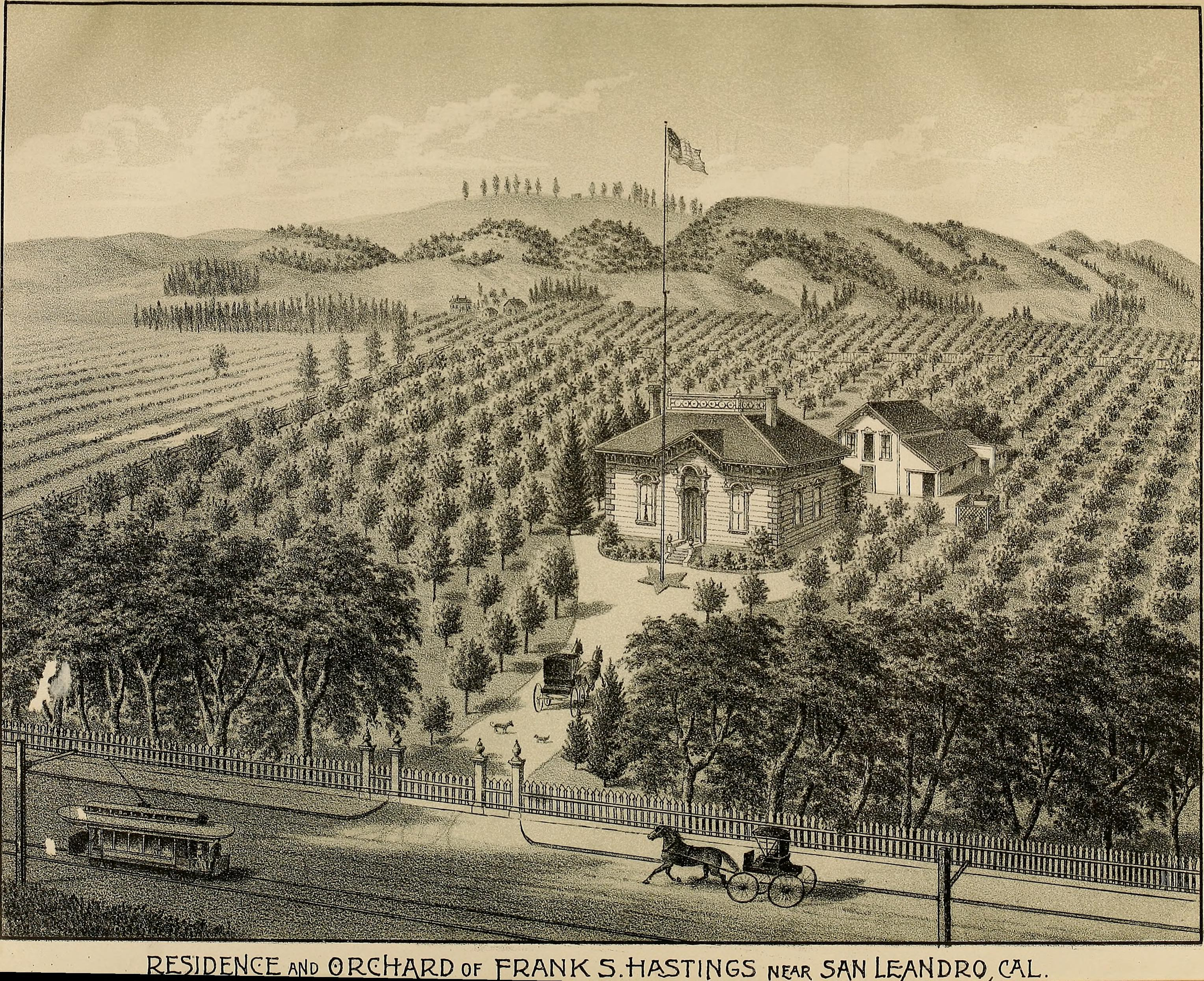
1893 engraving of a Mission with nectarine trees

=== Colonial Mission Establishment ===
In the late 1700s, Franciscan missionaries established Spanish missions in California. Like earlier Spanish missions established in Baja California, these missions were surrounded by agricultural land, growing crops from Europe and the Americas, and raising animals originating from Europe. Indigenous workers from Baja California made up a large part of the initial labor force on California missions. In the early 1800s, this flow of laborers from Baja California had largely stopped, and the missions relied on converts from local tribes. By 1806, over 20,000 Mission Indians were "attached" to the California missions. As missions were expected to become largely self-sufficient, farming was a critically important Mission industry. George Vancouver visited Mission San Buenaventura in 1793 and noted the wide variety of crops grown: apples, pears, plums, figs, oranges, grapes, peaches, pomegranates, plantain, banana, coconut, sugar cane, indigo, various herbs, and prickly pear. Livestock was raised for meat, wool, leather, and tallow, and for cultivating the land. In 1832, at the height of their prosperity, the missions collectively owned over 150,000 cattle and over 120,000 sheep. They also raised horses, goats, and pigs.

While the Spanish were the most successful farmers active in California in the early 1800s, they were not the only ones. In 1812, the Russians established Fort Ross in what is now Sonoma County, California, and intended the fort in part as an agricultural supply point for other Russian activity on the west coast. Despite Russian plans for the colony, agriculture at Fort Ross had low yields, significantly lower than the California missions. Inefficient farming methods, labor shortages, coastal fog, and rodents all contributed to limit agriculture at the fort.

The Spanish (1784–1810) and Mexican (1819–1846) governments made a large number of land grants to private individuals from 1785 to 1846. These ranchos included land taken from the missions following government-imposed secularization in 1833, after which the missions' productivity declined significantly. The ranchos were focused on cattle, and hides and tallow were their main products. There was no market for large quantities of beef (before refrigeration and railroads) until the California Gold Rush.

== 1850–1900 ==
In 1848, before the Gold Rush, the population of California was about 15,000, not counting Native Americans. By 1852, there were over 250,000 people in the new state. and by 1870, 560,000 people. This rapid population growth drove an increase in importation of agricultural products, and, within a few years, a massive growth in in-state agriculture. In the first years of the gold rush, the state relied on agricultural imports arriving by ship, from Australia, Chile, and Hawaii. During these years, there was rapid growth in vegetable farming for local markets. This was followed by an expansion of grain farming. A shift in the economic dominance of grain farming over cattle raising was marked by the passage of the California "No-Fence Law" of 1874. This repealed the Trespass Act of 1850, which had required farmers to protect their planted fields from free-ranging cattle. The repeal of the Trespass Act required that ranchers fence stock in, rather than farmers fencing cattle out. The ranchers were faced with either the high expense of fencing large grazing tracts or selling their cattle at ruinous prices. By the 1890s, California was second in US wheat production, producing over one million tons of wheat per year, but mono-crop wheat farming had depleted the soil in some areas resulting in reduced crops.

The Wakamatsu Tea and Silk Farm Colony (1869 - 1871) is believed to be the first permanent Japanese settlement in North America. The group exhibited their produce during the 1869 California State Agricultural Fair in Sacramento and the 1870 Horticultural Fair in San Francisco.

David Jacks (businessman) popularised Monterey Jack cheese in the 1860s.

During the 1890s, the oyster industry thrived until it became the single most important fishery in the state, with the San Leandro Oyster Beds being of particular importance.

Irrigation was almost nonexistent in California in 1850, but by 1899, 12 percent of the state's improved farmland was irrigated.

Luther Burbank moved to Santa Rosa, California in 1875, and developed numerous commercially successful varieties of plants over the next 50 years.

== 1900–1950 ==
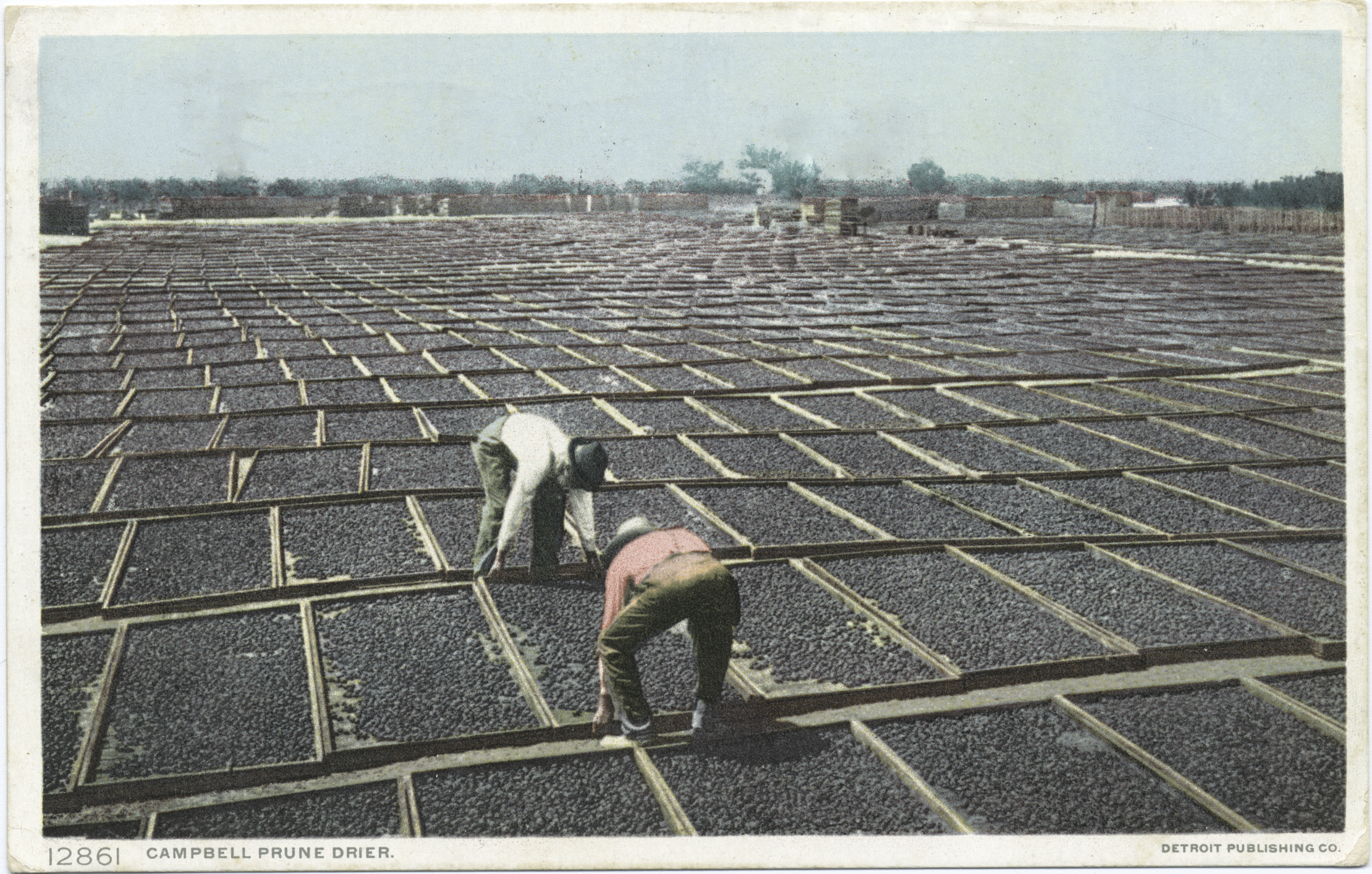
Drying prunes, 1908 or 1909

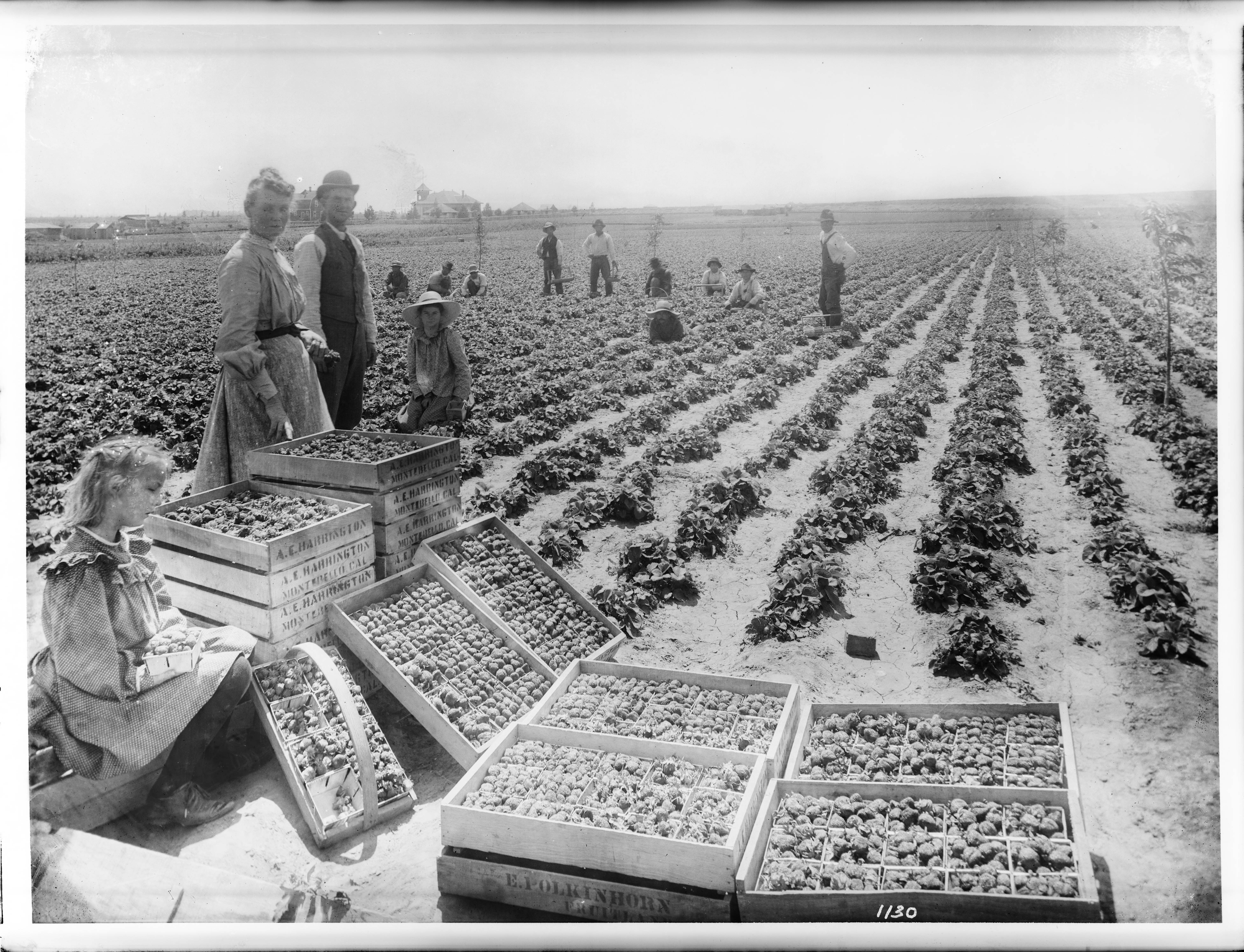
strawberry pickers in 1910

The 1902 Newlands Reclamation Act funded irrigation projects on arid lands in 20 states including California.

The 1903 Oxnard strike was a labor rights dispute in southern California where Japanese and Mexican sugar beet laborers challenged sugar beet companies over wages, commissions, and worker freedoms.

In 1905, the California legislature passed the University Farm Bill, which called for the establishment of a farm school for the University of California (at the time, Berkeley was the sole campus of the university). The commission took a year to select a site for the campus, a tiny town then known as Davisville. UC Davis opened its doors as the "University Farm" to 40 degree students (all male) from UC Berkeley in January 1909.

The California Alien Land Law of 1913 prohibited "aliens ineligible for citizenship" from owning agricultural land or possessing long-term leases over it, but permitted leases lasting up to three years. It affected the Chinese, Indian, Japanese, and Korean immigrant farmers in California.

The 1913 Wheatland hop riot was a violent confrontation during a strike of agricultural workers demanding decent working conditions in Wheatland, California. The riot, which resulted in four deaths and numerous injuries, was among the first major farm labor confrontations in California.

In 1915, the Pure Milk Act defined margarine and pasteurization and established statewide milk grading.

In 1919, the California Department of Food and Agriculture was established. The department covers state food safety, state protection from invasive species, and promoting the state's agricultural industry.

In 1924, a major foot-and-mouth disease outbreak lead to quarantines, interstate embargoes, and the culling of over 100,000 animals.

The California water wars were a series of political conflicts between the city of Los Angeles and farmers and ranchers in the Owens Valley of eastern California over water rights.

The Dust Bowl of the 1930s drove many people from the American prairie, and a significant number of these economic migrants relocated to California. Poor migrants from Oklahoma and nearby states were sometimes referred to as Okies, generally a pejorative term. In 1933, the state saw a number of agricultural labor strikes, with the largest actions against cotton growers. Cherry, grape, peach, pear, sugar beet, and tomato workers were also involved.

In 1936, strikes in southern California included the Venice celery strike and Citrus Strike of 1936.

Japanese immigrants, who had arrived with agricultural skills early in the 20th century, played a significant role in cultivating strawberries prior to World War II.

In 1942, the United States began the Bracero program. Lasting until 1964, this agreement established decent living conditions and a minimum wage for Mexican workers in the United States.

== 1950–2000 ==
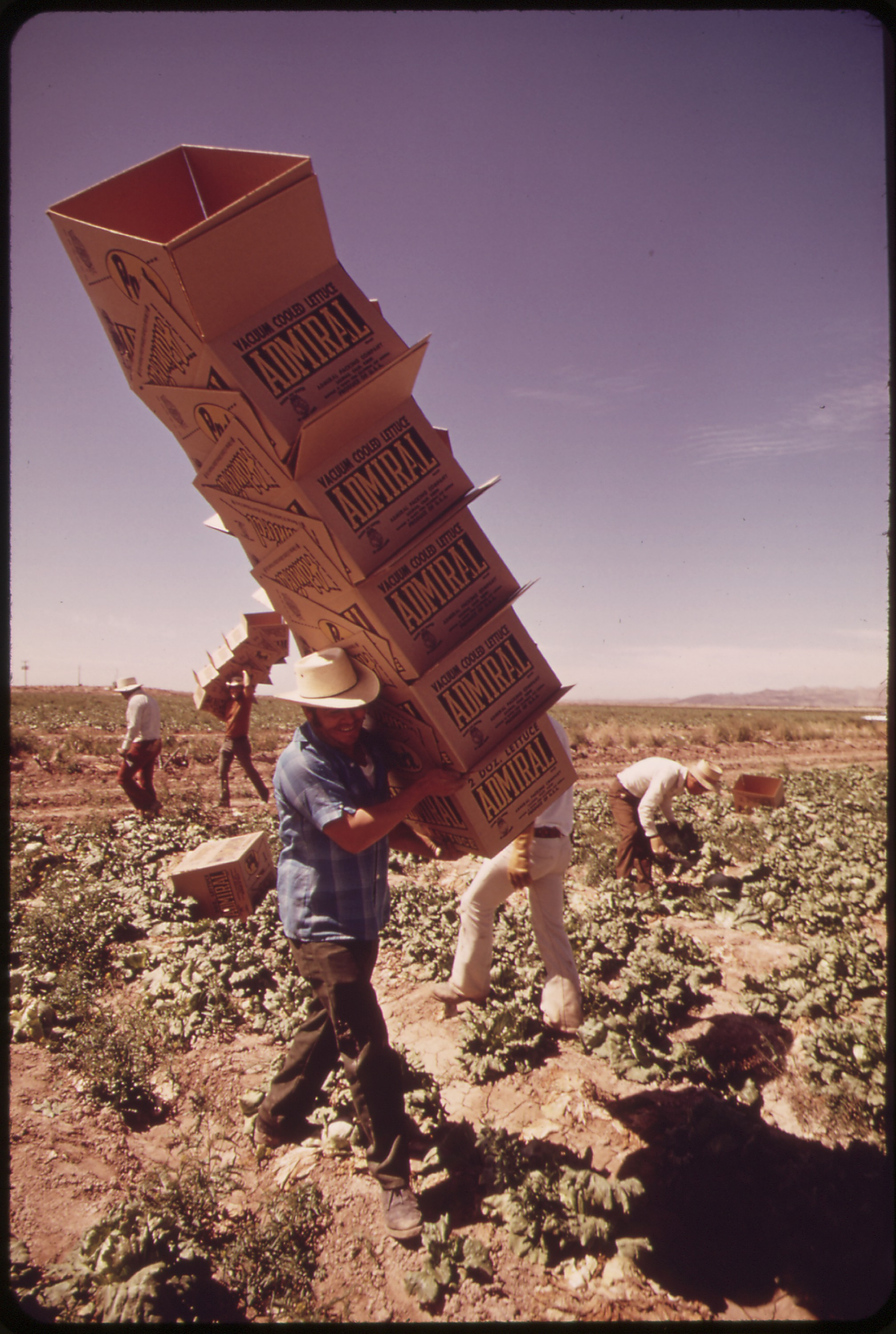
Mexican farm workers along the Colorado River (1970s)

The 1963 Chualar bus crash in which a freight train collided with a flatbed truck carrying 58 migrant farmworkers outside of Chualar CA is ranked as the deadliest automobile accident in U.S. history, according to the National Safety Council. 32 people died.

In 1965, the Williamson Act became law, providing property tax relief to owners of California farmland and open-space land in exchange for agreement that the land will not be developed.

The 1965-68 Tulare labor camps rent strike were actions by tenants of the Woodville and Linnell farm labor camps against rent increases by the Tulare County Housing Authority and the uninhabitable conditions of the tin huts they lived in.

The 1960s and 1970s saw major farm worker strikes including the 1965 Delano grape strike and the 1970 Salad Bowl strike. In 1975, the California Agricultural Labor Relations Act of 1975 was enacted, establishing the right to collective bargaining for farmworkers in California, a first in U.S. history. Individuals with prominent roles in farm worker organizing in this period include Cesar Chavez, Dolores Huerta, Larry Itliong, and Philip Vera Cruz.

In 1973, California Certified Organic Farmers is established, one of the first organic certification entities in the United States.

In 1985, a serious Listeria outbreak in California was linked to Queso blanco made by Jalisco Mexican Products Inc. based in Artesia, California. There were 52 confirmed deaths, including 19 stillbirths and 10 infant deaths. At the time, it was the deadliest foodborne illness outbreak in the United States, measured by the number of deaths, since the Centers for Disease Control and Prevention had begun tracking outbreaks in the 1970s. Alta Dena supplied the raw milk to Jalisco to make the cheese. Jalisco had a non-licensed technician perform the pasteurization, though pasteurized milk might have been diluted with non-pasteurized milk by the technician. On July 15, 1989, Alta Dena was absolved of any blame.

In the late 1980s the Ives flower ranch was the site of a notorious employment case. This ranch was in Ventura and involved Mixtec farm workers (from the southern Mexican state of Oaxaca) and illegal employment conditions. The ranch paid $1.5 million in unpaid wages and fines.

Through 1995 there were 50,000 Mixtecs every year in California agriculture. They were about 70% of the 10,000 agricultural laborers in San Diego County, and had been spreading northwards to also work in Oxnard, Santa Maria and Madera County, and even into Oregon and Washington. They were usually not the only indigenous Mexican ethnic groups – Zapotecs and Mayans were also usually working the same jobs. In the 1990s it was common to arrive in Arizona first, work on an Arizonan farm, and then move to California.

In 1993, the first year registered organic farms were counted under 1990 California Organic Foods Act, there were 1157 Organic farms covering over 40,000 acres. By 2000, there were 1,903 farms covering almost 150,000 acres.

== 2001–present ==
In 2007–2008, the light brown apple moth controversy involved arial spraying or a pheromone formulation to try to eradicate an agricultural pest in Monterey and Santa Cruz counties and the subsequent legal challenges and public pushback.

In the 2000s and 2010s, Californians voted for propositions which established new protections for farm animals. 2008 California Proposition 2 and 2018 California Proposition 12 both established minimum requirements for farming egg-laying hens, breeding pigs, and calves raised for veal. Few veal and pig factory farm operations exist in California, so these propositions mostly affect farmers who raise California's 15 million egg-laying hens.

The 2022–2023 California floods devastated berry and greens cultivation areas, and impacted worker housing.

== Citrus industry ==
Citrus cultivation in California began with the Spanish missionaries, who planted oranges and lemons at Baja California around 1739 and at Alta California missions by 1769. Early fruit was thick-skinned and sour, not suited for commercial markets. The first sizable grove was established at Mission San Gabriel in 1804, with about 400 trees on six acres. This mission-based agriculture ended with secularization which closed the missions and gave away their lands in 1835. Jean-Louis Vignes likely planted the first private orange grove in Los Angeles in 1834. William Wolfskill was the first commercial citrus grower in California, planting his orchard in Los Angeles in 1841. By 1862, his orchards held two-thirds of California's orange trees, marking him as the founder of the state's commercial citrus industry. The California gold rush (from 1849) increased demand for oranges, especially for their vitamin C, which helped prevent scurvy among miners. This spurred gradual expansion of orchards. After 1869 the opening of transcontinental railroads gave farmers the opportunity to serve the national demand for highly profitable fruit crops like oranges, lemons, apples and cherries. In the early 1870s, Wolfskill's reported profits of $1,000 per acre attracted more farmers to citrus growing.

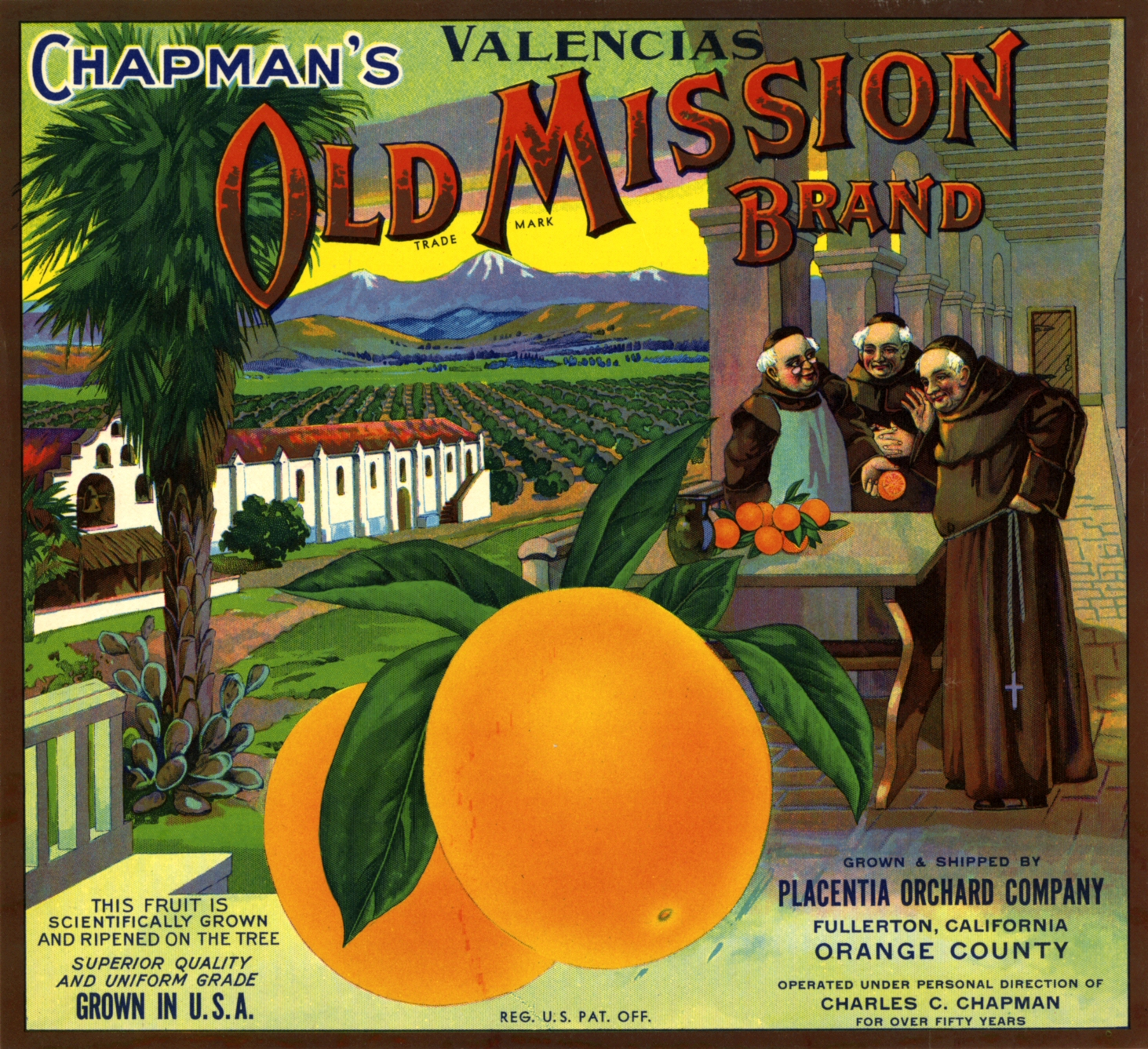
Advertisement for the Valencia orange, which became the major industrial crop by the 1920s--but despite the illustration this particular variety was unknown in the mission era.

The 1870s saw the introduction of improved fruit varieties. In 1873, navel orange plants from Brazil were distributed by the U.S. Department of Agriculture. Luther C. Tibbets and Eliza Tibbets successfully cultivated these in Riverside, leading to widespread planting of the sweet, seedless navel orange, which became the backbone of the California citrus industry. The Valencia orange, introduced in 1876, matured in summer and fall, complementing the winter-ripening navel and providing oranges year-round. The Eureka lemon (from Sicily) and Lisbon lemon (from Spain) were introduced in the same period, offering improved varieties and year-round crops. Grapefruit was introduced from Florida in the 1880s. The completion of major railroads (Southern Pacific in 1877, and the Santa Fe in 1885) and the introduction of ventilated boxcars revolutionized distribution, opening national markets and triggering a planting frenzy in southern California. By 1885, the number of citrus trees in California had grown from 90,000 (in 1875) to 2 million, and to 4.5 million by 1901.

The 1890s brought pest control advances (spraying, fumigation) and frost protection (heaters, later wind machines). The University of California established its Citrus Experiment Station in 1907, supporting research and innovation. Cooperative marketing emerged with the formation of the California Fruit Growers Exchange in 1905, later known as Sunkist Growers Inc., which helped standardize and market California citrus worldwide.

According to H. Vincent Moses, citrus growers considered themselves market-oriented businessmen, not land-oriented "ordinary" farmers. By the 1890s forward they relied on modern business ideas to enlarge the national markets and high price of citrus fruit. In 1905 they organized the California Fruit Growers Exchange (CFGE) to coordinate their efforts. The growers in Riverside County took the lead in adapting industrial methods to grow, package, advertise and sell their product. They treated farm workers like factory workers and strongly opposed labor unions, sometimes with violence.

In the early 20th century California dominated the nation's citrus supply, especially from Los Angeles and Orange counties. Since then the geography has shifted. Florida is now dominant in oranges. By the 1980s, California supplied about 75% of the nation's lemons. It was the second largest orange producer in the U.S., ranked third in grapefruit, and was a major source of limes and tangerines. Today about 90% of the state's citrus production is located in five counties: Fresno, Kern, Tulare, Ventura and Riverside. Apart from home gardens, citrus is no longer a factor in the Los Angeles area.

== Cotton farming ==
Cotton was first introduced to California by padres, who brought it from Mexico and cultivated it at missions in both Baja California and Alta California during the early 19th century. These efforts were small-scale and mainly aimed at providing clothing for mission communities; they ended with the closure of the missions in 1834. During the Civil War, the Union lost access to Southern cotton, prompting a short-lived experiment in California where about 2,000 acres were planted in 1863. However, the region's cool weather and limited rainfall led to poor results, and the attempt was abandoned.

Significant commercial cotton production began in the early 20th century in the Imperial Valley. It then expanded rapidly in the San Joaquin Valley, which proved ideal for cotton due to its medium sandy loam soils, a long rain-free growing season, large-scale irrigation, and relative freedom from pests like the boll weevil that ravaged the Southern states. In sharp contrast to the small family farms in the South, California's large well-capitalized farms invested heavily in machinery and tractors, making planting and harvesting more efficient. A major breakthrough came with the introduction of the Acala cotton strain developed at the Shafter Cotton Research Station. It was well-suited to California conditions and led to increased yields and higher quality. State laws passed in 1925 mandated the exclusive cultivation of Acala cotton in key regions to prevent cross-pollination and support marketing efforts.

Production grew substantially in the 1930s, and after World War II, mechanical cotton pickers from International Harvester and Allis-Chalmers dramatically reduced the need for labor provided by Mexican immigrants. Meanwhile, in the southern United States, millions of small-scale family farmers—many of them Black—left agriculture for urban jobs. California's cotton output surged, especially in the San Joaquin, Imperial, and Coachella valleys. By 1970, cotton had become California's leading cash crop. However, after 2000, production declined due to new insect pests and the higher profitability of alternative crops. Cotton manufacturing never flourished in the state, as high labor costs made it uncompetitive with mills in the South and abroad.

== See also ==
- Bibliography of California history
- History of California wine
- Mother Orange Tree, planted 1854 and still growing
- James Griffin Boswell (1882–1952), his company ran the world's largest privately owned farm.
- Henry Miller (rancher) (1827–1916) and Charles Lux (1823–1887); owned the most land in California
- Tejon Ranch, The biggest ranch
