= California Historical Landmarks in Kern County =

Properties and districts listed as California Historical Landmarks within Kern County.

- Note: Click the "Map of all coordinates" link to the right to view a Google map of all properties and districts with latitude and longitude coordinates in the table below.

== Listings ==
Image		Landmark name	Location	City or town	Summary
20 Mule Team Borax Terminus	652	20 Mule Team Borax Terminus	16246 Sierra Hwy. 35°03′24″N 118°10′31″W	Mojave	
Bealville	741	Bealville	Bealville Rd. 35°16′19″N 118°37′34″W	Caliente	
Buena Vista Refinery	504	Buena Vista Refinery	Hwy 33 & LoKern Rd. 35°23′52″N 119°39′54″W	McKittrick	
Buttonwillow Tree	492	Buttonwillow Tree	Buttonwillow Dr. 35°24′25″N 119°28′27″W	Buttonwillow	
Caliente	757	Caliente	35°17′26″N 118°37′36″W	Caliente	
California Standard Oil Well 1	376	California Standard Oil Well 1	McKittrick Oil Field; 35°17′54″N 119°38′02″W	McKittrick	
Campsite of Edward M. Kern	742	Campsite of Edward M. Kern	Old Isabella Road Recreation Area; 35°38′58″N 118°27′30″W	Lake Isabella	
Colonel Thomas Baker Memorial	382	Colonel Thomas Baker Memorial	Bakersfield City Hall; 35°22′23″N 119°01′10″W	Bakersfield	
Desert Spring	476	Desert Spring	Pappas Ranch on Pappas Rd. 35°18′06″N 117°57′15″W	Cantil	
Discovery well of Kern River Oilfield	290	Discovery well of Kern River Oilfield	Round Mountain Rd. 35°25′42″N 118°57′17″W	Bakersfield	Appointment must be made to view.
Fages-Zalvidea Crossing	291	Fages-Zalvidea Crossing	State Hwy 166; 35°03′33″N 119°04′00″W	Bakersfield	
Fort Tejon	129	Fort Tejon	Fort Tejón State Historic Park; 34°52′24″N 118°53′44″W	Lebec	Also on the NRHP list as NPS-71000140
Freeman Junction	766	Freeman Junction	Historic district 35°36′07″N 117°54′26″W	Inyokern	
Garcés Baptismal Site	631	Garcés Baptismal Site	State Hwy 155; 35°44′48″N 118°55′34″W	Woody	
Garcés Circle	277	Garcés Circle	Chester Ave & 30th St. 35°23′13″N 119°01′08″W	Bakersfield	
Site of the town of Garlock	671	Site of the town of Garlock	Historic district 35°24′09″N 117°47′26″W	Randsburg	
Glennville Adobe	495	Glennville Adobe	Kern County Fire Department Glennville Substation; 35°43′36″N 118°42′02″W	Glennville	
Gordon's Ferry	137	Gordon's Ferry	Kern River; 35°25′29″N 118°58′05″W	Bakersfield	
Havilah	100	Havilah	Miller St. & Kern River Canyon Rd. 35°31′06″N 118°30′59″W	Caliente	
Indian Wells	457	Indian Wells	Indian Wells Lodge, 2565 Aerospace Highway; 35°40′04″N 117°52′20″W	Inyokern	
Kern River Slough Station	588	Kern River Slough Station	Panama Rd. 35°15′35″N 118°58′03″W	Lamont	
Kernville	132	Kernville	Old Kernville Cemetery, Wofford Rd. 35°43′13″N 118°26′09″W	Kernville	
Keysville	98	Keysville	Black Gulch Rd. 35°37′33″N 118°30′39″W	Lake Isabella	
Lakeview Gusher	485	Lakeview Gusher	Petroleum Club Rd. 35°05′29″N 119°24′05″W	Maricopa	
Upload Photo	672	Lavers' Crossing	White River & Jack Ranch rds. 35°44′10″N 118°43′13″W	Glennville	
McKittrick Brea Pit	498	McKittrick Brea Pit	State Hwy 33 and State Hwy 58; 35°17′47″N 119°37′33″W	McKittrick	
Mountain House	589	Mountain House	Dry Creek on Bakersfield-Glennville Rd. 35°39′52″N 118°54′58″W	Woody	
Oak Creek Pass	97	Oak Creek Pass	Willow Pass Rd. 35°03′40″N 118°23′19″W	Tehachapi	
Old Town (Tehachapi)	643	Old Town (Tehachapi)	Old Town Rd. & Woodford-Tehachapi Rd. 35°08′35″N 118°29′40″W	Tehachapi	
Outermost point in the South San Joaquin Valley visited by Padre Garcés in 1776	371	Outermost point in the South San Joaquin Valley visited by Padre Garcés in 1776	Saint Thomas the Apostle Church, 350 E. Bear Mountain Blvd. 35°12′29″N 118°49′17″W	Arvin	Located in the courtyard of the church
Place where Francisco Garcés crossed the Kern River	278	Place where Francisco Garcés crossed the Kern River	State Hwy 178 and Rancheria Rd. 35°24′58″N 118°49′59″W	Bakersfield	
Point on the Jedediah Smith Trail	660	Point on the Jedediah Smith Trail	Old Bena & Tower Line Rd. 35°19′56″N 118°48′24″W	Edison	
Posey Creek Station of Butterfield Overland Mail Lines	539	Posey Creek Station of Butterfield Overland Mail Lines	Bakersfield-Glennville Rd. & Round Mountain Rd. 35°31′50″N 118°57′41″W	Bakersfield	
Rand Mining District	938	Rand Mining District	Kern County Desert Museum; 35°22′05″N 117°39′20″W	Randsburg	
Rose Station	300	Rose Station	Grapevine Rd. & D St. 34°56′29″N 118°55′57″W	Lebec	
Sebastian Indian Reservation	133	Sebastian Indian Reservation	Grapevine Rd. & D St. 34°56′28″N 118°55′57″W	Lebec	
Shafter Cotton Research Station	1022	Shafter Cotton Research Station	17053 Shafter Avenue; 35°31′57″N 119°16′41″W	Shafter	Also on the NRHP list as NPS-97001211
Sinks of Tejon	540	Sinks of Tejon	David and Wheeler Ridge rds. 35°05′34″N 118°54′54″W	Mettler	Brick monument is at 35.092833, -118.915050. The California Historical Landmark reads: NO. 540 SINKS OF THE TEJÓN, ALSO KNOWN AS ALAMO, STATION OF BUTTERFIELD OVERLAND MAIL LINES - Six miles east of this point was the site of the Butterfield Stage Line station Sinks of Tejón. Operating through present Kern County during 1858-61, this famous line ran from St. Louis, Missouri to San Francisco until the outbreak of the Civil War. The station may have been here 35.092834, -118.819310
Site of the flight of the Gossamer Condor	923	Site of the flight of the Gossamer Condor	Shafter Airport; 35°30′00″N 119°10′54″W	Shafter	
Site of the last home of Alexis Godey	690	Site of the last home of Alexis Godey	414 19th St. 35°22′35″N 119°00′29″W	Bakersfield	
Site of the home of Elisha Stevens	732	Site of the home of Elisha Stevens	W. Columbus & Isla Verde sts. 35°23′50″N 119°00′21″W	Bakersfield	
Tehachapi Loop	508	Tehachapi Loop	Old State Highway; 35°12′03″N 118°32′13″W	Tehachapi	
Top of Grapevine Pass where Don Pedro Fages passed in 1772	283	Top of Grapevine Pass where Don Pedro Fages passed in 1772	Lebec Rd., W side of Interstate 5, 0.2 mi. S of exit 207; 34°50′03″N 118°51′56″W	Lebec	
Tulamniu Indian Site	374	Tulamniu Indian Site	SE of Blockhouse #BV4	Taft	
Walker's Pass	99	Walker's Pass	State Hwy 178; 35°39′46″N 118°01′37″W	Onyx	Also on the NRHP list as NPS-66000210
Well 2-6	581	Well 2-6	Broadway Ave; 35°10′47″N 119°32′56″W	Fellows	Marker is across the street from Fellows Park
Willow Springs	130	Willow Springs	Manly Rd. 34°52′38″N 118°17′51″W	Rosamond	

== See also ==
- List of California Historical Landmarks
- National Register of Historic Places listings in Kern County, California
