= Joseph R. Walker =

American explorer

Joseph Rutherford Walker
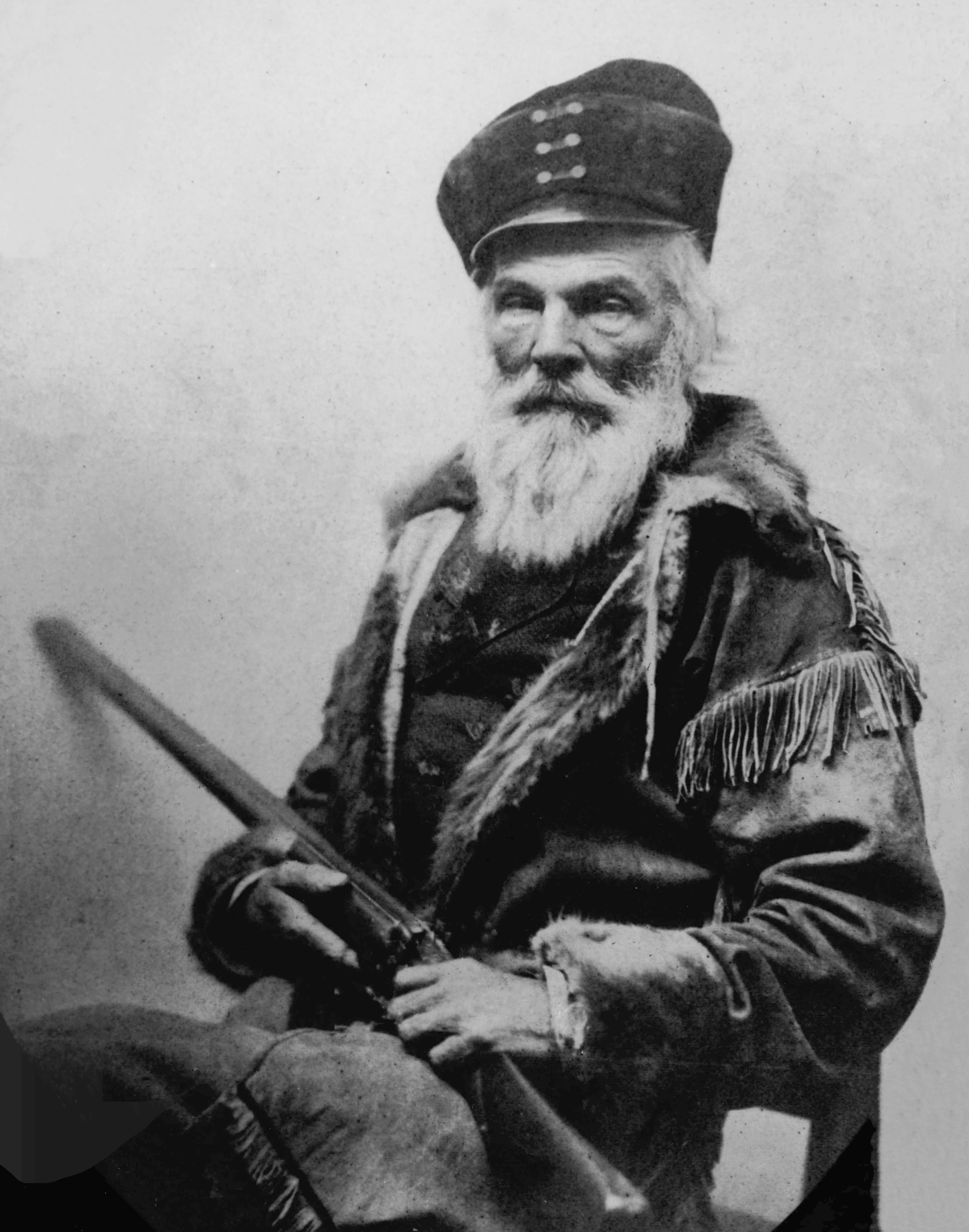
- Joseph Walker circa 1860-1865 by Mathew Brady
- Born: December 13, 1798; Roane County, Tennessee
- Died: October 27, 1876 (aged 77); Manzanita Ranch, Contra Costa County, California
- Other names: Joseph Reddford Walker, Joseph Reddeford Walker, Joseph Redeford Walker
- Occupations: Explorer; mountain man; scout

Joseph Rutherford Walker (December 13, 1798 – October 27, 1876) was a mountain man and experienced scout. He established the segment of the California Trail, the primary route for the emigrants to the gold fields during the California gold rush, from Fort Hall, Idaho to the Truckee River. The Walker River and Walker Lake in Nevada were named for him by John C. Frémont. (Note: Oak Creek Pass was also named for him by Frémont, but the designation was later changed to another pass to the north, now known as Walker Pass.)

== Early life ==
The R. stood for Rutherford, but is also found as Reddford, Reddeford, and Redeford. "Rutherford" came from his great-grandmother's, Kathleen Rutherford Walker, line, and not his mother's, as incorrectly stated in some sources.

== Early years ==
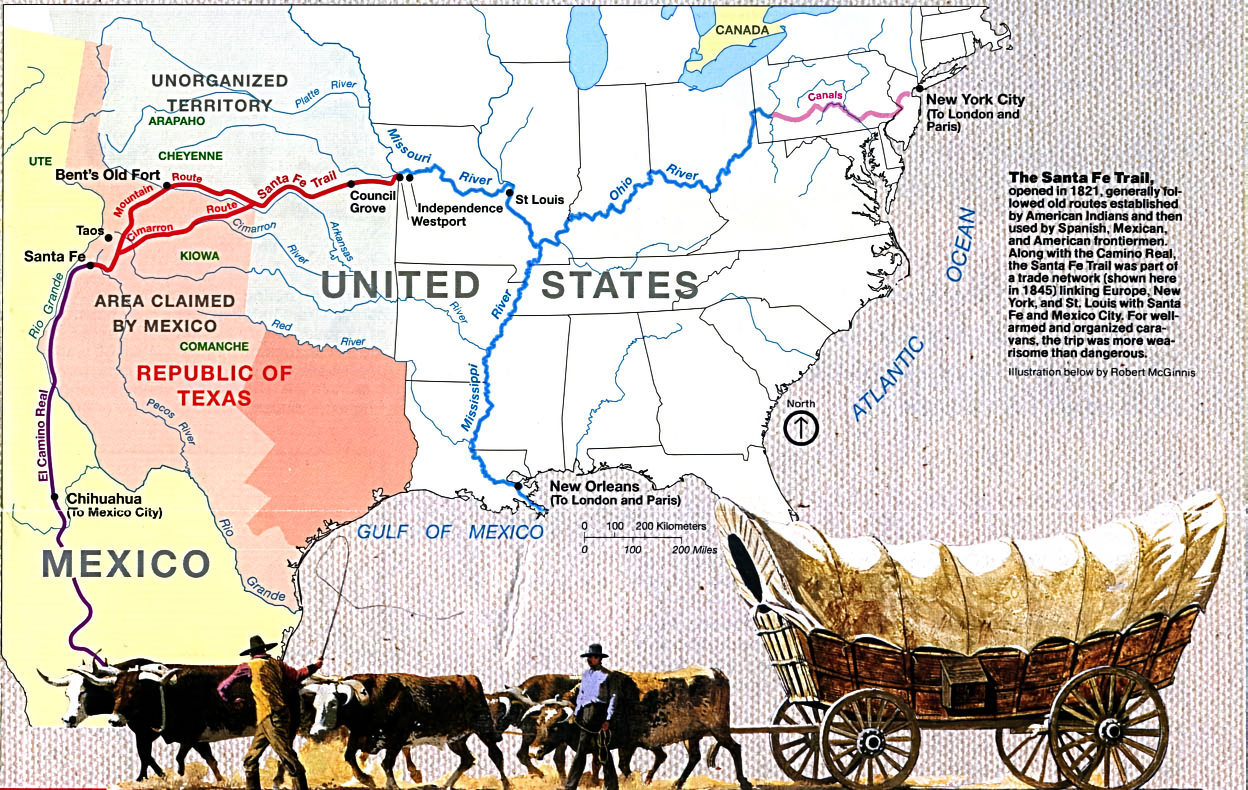
Map of Santa Fe Trail

Walker was born in Roane County, Tennessee, the fourth child of seven born to Joseph and Susan Willis Walker. In 1819, the family emigrated to Missouri, settling west of Fort Osage. In 1820, he traveled to Santa Fe and was detained for a short while by Spanish authorities. He may have become one of the "Taos trappers" trapping beaver in the Spanish/Mexican (Note: Mexico declared independence from Spain in 1822) territory of Alta California, then working on the Santa Fe Trail from Missouri to Santa Fe with "Old" Bill Williams. He returned to Missouri and in 1827 was appointed sheriff of Jackson County.

== Explorations of California and the Great Basin ==
In 1830, Walker was driving horses to Fort Gibson in Oklahoma, where he met Benjamin Bonneville. Walker wanted to explore the American frontier, and Bonneville offered him an opportunity to join him in his expeditions. In 1832, Walker left from Fort Osage with Bonneville and 110 other men, traveling to the Green River in Wyoming.

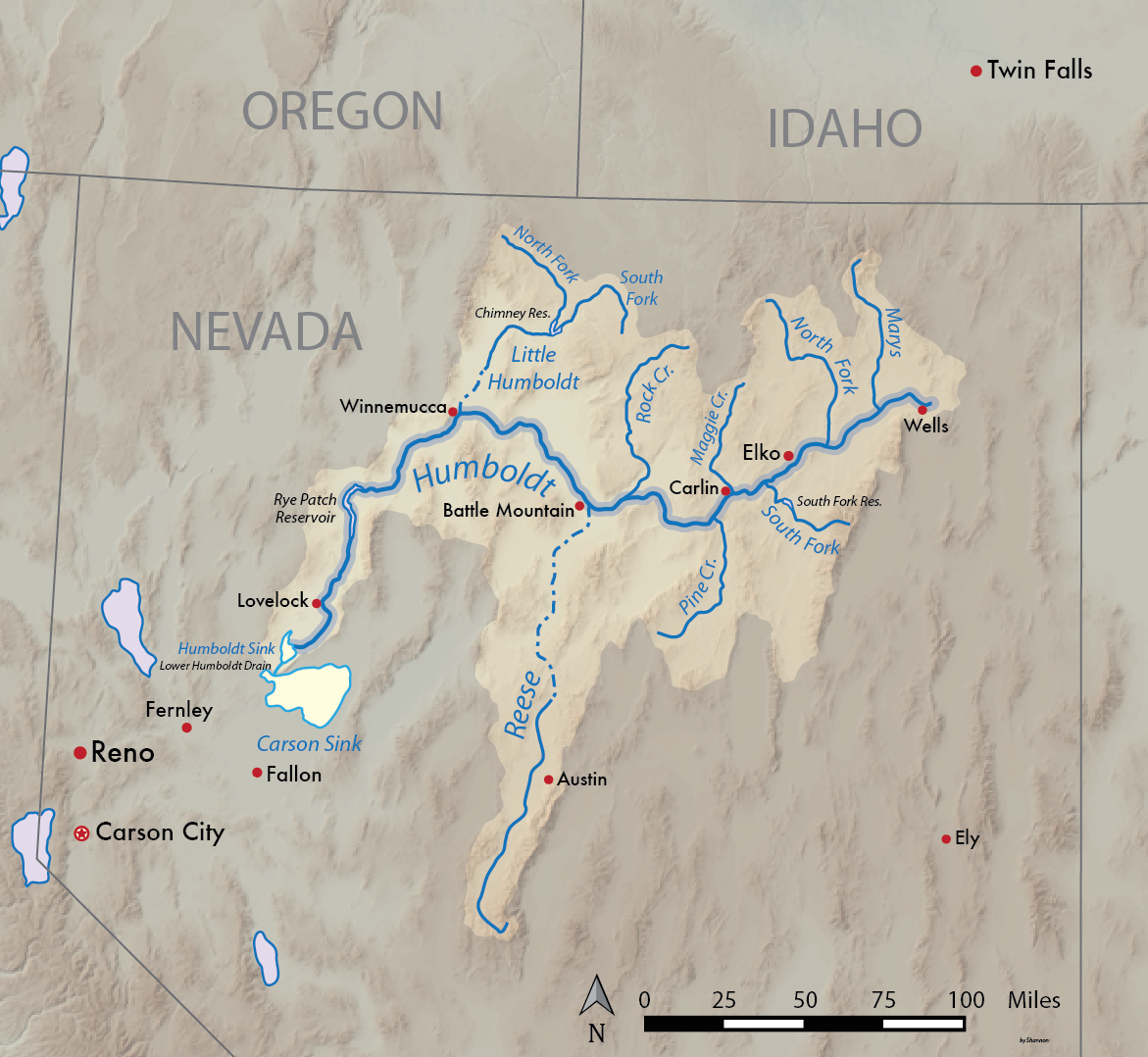
Watershed of the Humboldt River

In 1833, Bonneville sent Walker in command of a party of men, including Old Bill Williams and Zenas Leonard, from the Green River to explore the Great Salt Lake and to find an overland route to California. They left on July 27 and eventually discovered a route along the Humboldt River across present-day Nevada. In contrast to earlier historical interpretations, Scott Stine, professor emeritus from California State University East Bay, determined that reasonable travel rates did not permit them to reach the Sierran foothills near Yosemite within constraints from Leonard's account of the journey. Stine proposed that they followed the Humboldt River to the Humboldt Sink, then made their way to present day Genoa, Nevada at the base of the Sierra Nevada. They began their ascent of the Sierra by traveling up the west fork of the Carson River to Hawkins Peak. At that point, they began wandering, trying to find a path to a dividing ridge and down the western slope. They finally made their way to the headwaters of the Stanislaus River and descended on the ridgeline north of the river canyon. They eventually made it to the river itself, then followed it down to the Central Valley of California. More recently, Patrick Vaughan proposed that modifications and combinations of previous Yosemite routing via the eastern Pine Nut Mountains and headwaters of the West Walker River met Stine's reasonable travel rate constraints through the Eastern Sierran foothills, and that independent accounts by party members George Nidever, Stephen Meek, Leonard and Walker himself, later corroborated by Sierran explorer Lafayette Bunnell, favored the Yosemite routing proposed by earlier historians. Improvements in Yosemite region topography in John Fremont's 1845 and 1848 maps of the West, changes that could only be attributed to Walker's knowledge and influence in their depiction, further corroborates a Yosemite route. According to Walker's gravestone, he camped in Yosemite on Nov. 13 1833, and though this date is more likely in error, the Yosemite camping assertion is more likely correct. After crossing the Sierra's Leonard's journal clearly says that they followed the river (San Joaquin River) that empties into San Francisco Bay and that they reached the Pacific, about 40 miles south from San Francisco. The approach to the Sierra via the Humboldt River route later became known as the California Trail, the primary route for the emigrants to the gold fields during the California gold rush.

On February 14, 1834, Walker and his party of fifty-two men left on their return trip from California, crossing back over the Sierra Nevada through one of the southern passes. (Note: Which pass Walker used is disputed. While it is generally accepted that the Native American guides he engaged took him over what is today known as "Walker Pass", G. Andrew Miller avers that the party crossed over 50 miles north of there, descending the eastern Sierra at Haiwee Pass.) The group made it to Owens Valley on May 1, 1834, and traveled up it but became impatient to turn east. They crossed out of the valley on May 10 but soon became alarmed by the lack of water. They went back west to the base of the Sierra and traveled north to the Humboldt Sink, then they traveled back to the Rocky Mountains the way they had come the previous summer.

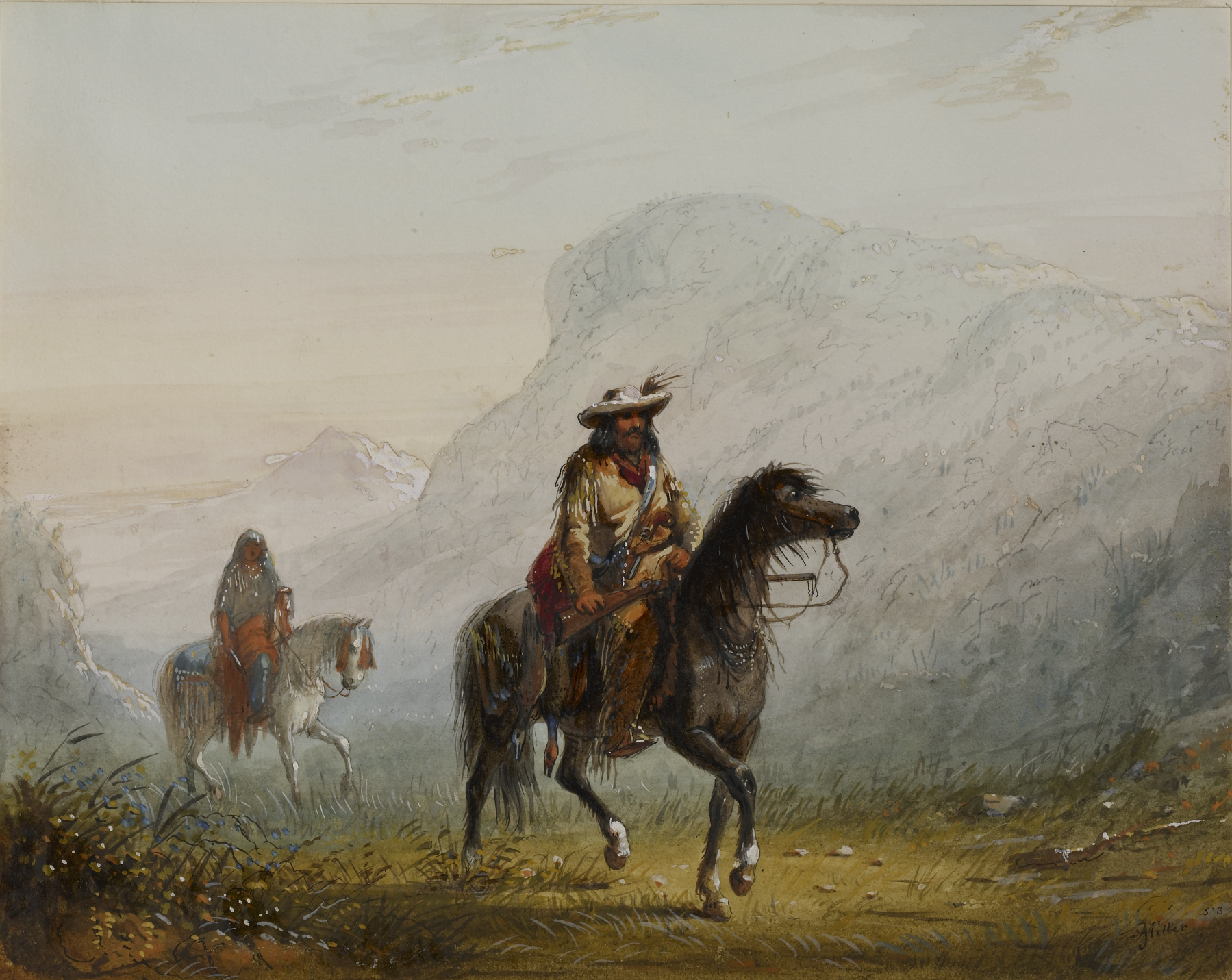
"Painting by Alfred Jacob Miller, titled Bourgeois W—r, and His Squaw"

At some point in the ensuing years, Walker took a Shoshone wife.

In 1840 Walker and a band of followers made the first known north to south crossing of the eastern Great Basin by Americans. Starting from Browns Park (Brown's Hole) along the Green River, Walker and his men crossed the Wasatch Range to the Sevier Lake and traveled south to the upper Virgin River which they descended until reaching its confluence with the Colorado River. From the Colorado, they crossed the Mojave Desert to Los Angeles where Walker sold 417 pounds of beaver pelts to Abel Stearns, an American expatriate living in Los Angeles, who became Walker's business agent in purchasing horses. Walker left California with a hundred mares and an unknown number of mules.

== Emigrant leader ==
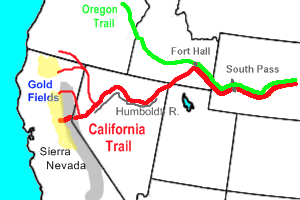
Main route of California Trail (thick red line), including Applegate-Lassen and Beckwourth variations (thinner red lines)

After travelling to California in the Bartleson–Bidwell Party of 1841 Joseph B. Chiles returned to western Missouri and organized the first wagon train of California bound emigrants in 1843. (Note: The Bartleson-Bidwell Party had to abandon their wagons at the Great Salt Lake and had used pack animals to cross the Sierras at Ebbetts Pass) At Fort Laramie, Chiles hired Walker to guide the wagon train to California for $300. In August, at Black's Fork of the Green River, the party stopped to rest the animals and hunt, trying to stock dried meat for the trail. They were marginally successful, and being able to only acquire four head of cattle at Ft. Hall, Walker and Chiles decided to split the party in order to make best use of the remaining provisions. After leaving Fort Hall on September 16, Chiles took 13 men on horseback to Fort Boise for further provisions. If food was not available, he was to cross the Sierra Nevada in the vicinity of the Truckee River, proceed to Sutter's Fort for food, and bring it across the Sierra to Humboldt Sink where Walker and the wagon train would be waiting. (Note: Another account (Bancroft 1886:IV:394 395) places the proposed rendezvous at the west end of Walker Pass. The Walker party reached the Humboldt Sink on approximately October 22, 1843.) Once reunited they would proceed south through the Owens Valley, along the eastern scarp of the Sierra Nevada to a southern pass, possibly Oak Creek Pass where Walker believed the wagons could cross. (Note: Haiwee Pass was too steep for wagons, and it was probably too late in the year to cross such a higher (8500') pass.) The Chiles group was unable to obtain provisions at Fort Boise and circumvented the Sierra Nevada far to the north, rather than crossing at the Truckee River. Chiles reached Sutter's Fort on 11 November. Walker's group left the Humboldt Sink about 1 November and traded horseshoe nails for fish with the Paiute at what would later be known as Walker Lake. Possibly because of inadequate forage (it was a drought year) the animals were unable to pull the wagons beyond Owens Lake where the vehicles were abandoned along with a disassembled saw mill (see also Bancroft 1886:IV:392 395). The party proceeded on horseback and crossed Walker pass into the San Joaquin Valley on December 3, 1843. Thereafter they proceeded northward, crossed the Coast Range and wintered pleasantly in Peachtree Valley on the headwaters of a tributary to the Salinas River in the Salinas Valley (Bancroft 1886:IV:395). About the journey Gilbert states, "The overland caravan had done no true exploring but had laid down 500 miles of what was to become the California Trail". The trail segment referred to appears to extend from Fort Hall (Idaho) to the Truckee River (Nevada and California).

== Scouting with Frémont ==
After the expedition dispersed, Walker once again presented his passport to the authorities and was granted permission to trade. As before, he left southern California with a herd of horses and mules in April 1844 along the Old Spanish Trail and overtook John C. Frémont's third military topographic expedition (his first to California) somewhere beyond Las Vegas. The two had met previously in 1842 at Independence, Missouri, when Walker declined Frémont's invitation to guide the expedition. Walker's group traveled with Frêmont to Bent's Fort (Colorado) where they went their separate ways. In 1845, by prearrangement, Walker, with his wife and retainers, joined Frémont's third government expedition at White River (eastern Utah) bound for California and Oregon. Frémont had recruited Bill Williams and Kit Carson but Walker was appointed the chief guide. Walker and his followers had previously camped with one of the first U.S. dragoon units to patrol the emigration trails and was described as follows by Captain Philip St. George Cooke:

This afternoon Mr. Walker, whom we met at Independence Rock, visited our camp: he has picked up a small party at Fort Laramie; and wild looking creatures they are white and red. This man has abandoned civilization, married a squaw or squaws, and prefers to pass his life wandering in these deserts; carrying on, perhaps, an almost nominal business of hunting, trapping and trading but quite sufficient to the wants of a chief of savages. He is a man of much natural ability, and apparently of prowess and ready resource.

Walker led the main body of the expedition down the Humboldt River to Walker Lake where they met Frémont and a smaller group who had taken a more southerly route after leaving the vicinity of the Great Salt Lake. The party again divided, with Walker taking the main body to the current location of Lake Isabella in December while Frémont and a small group crossed the Sierra Nevada in the vicinity of Truckee River, eventually reaching Sutter's Fort (California). The two parties missed their planned rendezvous along the Kings River in the San Joaquin Valley but were reunited in February 1846.

== Later life ==
In 1862–63, Walker led a gold-hunting expedition of 34 men into the mountains of central Arizona, near what is now the city of Prescott. The company discovered gold along the Hassayampa Creek and Lynx Creek, which was the impetus for subsequent white settlement in the area. The village of Walker, Arizona, is named for him.

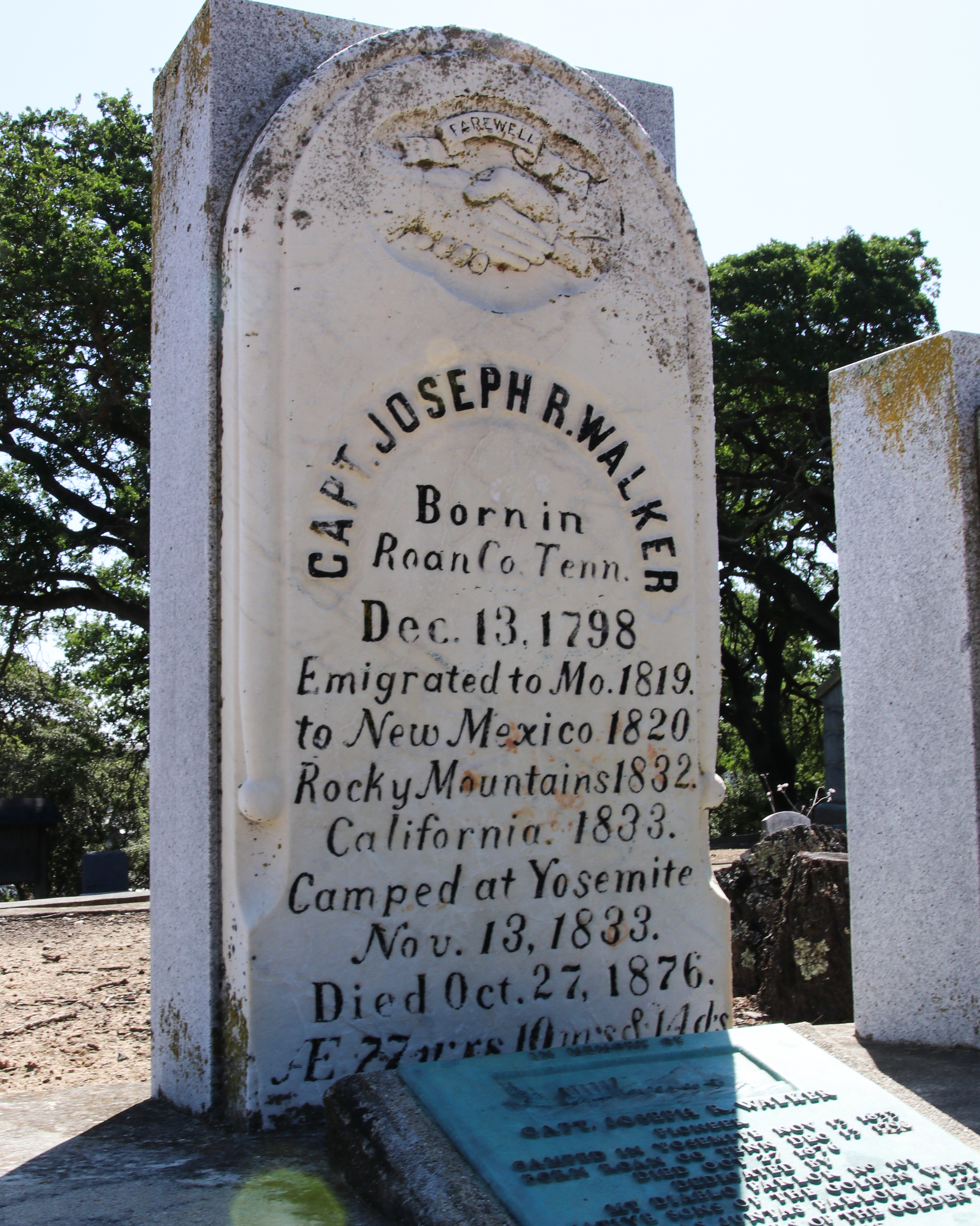
Walker's grave at the Alhambra Cemetery, Martinez, California

Walker returned to the family base of Manzanita Ranch in Contra Costa County, California, in 1867. He died there on October 27, 1876, and is buried in the Alhambra Cemetery in Martinez, California.

== Legacy ==
Several different places are named for Walker, including:

- Walker Pass
- Walker Basin
- Walker Lake (Nevada) – Lake in Nevada, United States
- Walker River – River in Nevada, United States
- Joe Walker Town, California
- Walker, Arizona
