= Elijah Stephens =

American blacksmith, trapper (1804–1887)

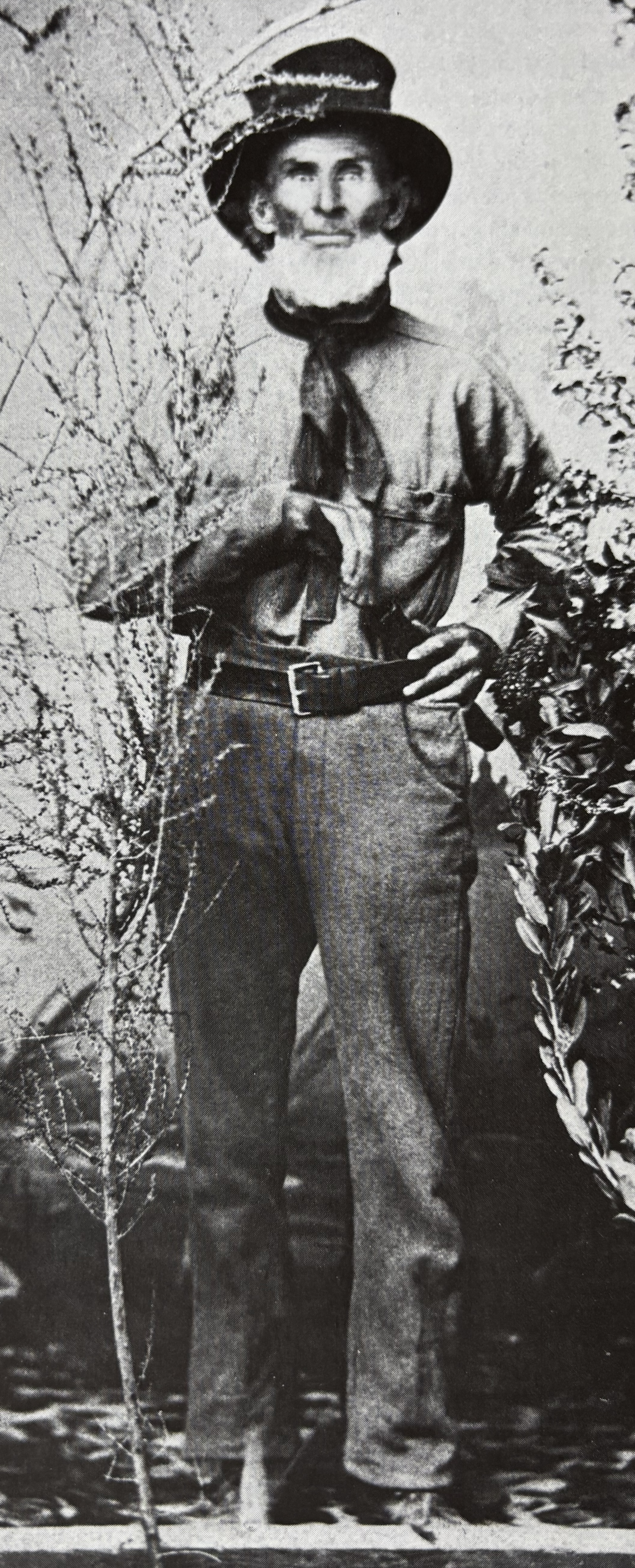
- Only known image of Elijah Stephens (ca. 1860) taken in San Jose, California
- Born: c. 1804; South Carolina, U.S.
- Died: September 9, 1887 (age 84); Kern County Hospital, Bakersfield, California, U.S.
- Resting place: Union Cemetery, Bakersfield, California
- Other name: Elisha Stephens
- Occupations: American pioneer, Blacksmith, and trapper

Elijah Stephens, commonly spelled as Elisha Stevens (c. 1804 – September 9, 1887) was an American blacksmith and trapper. He was an early settler in California.

== Life and career ==
He was born in either South Carolina or Georgia (state). In 1844, he left Council Bluffs, Iowa as the captain of the Stephens-Townsend-Murphy Party, the first wagon train to cross the Sierra Nevada mountains into Alta California. He then moved to Cupertino, California, in 1848. Stevens Creek (then called Cupertino Creek) is named after him.

In 1862, Stephens left the area, heading to Kern County in central California. A state historic plaque in that city marks the approximate site of his homestead. Stephens died on September 9, 1887, at the Kern County Hospital in Bakersfield, California. He was buried in Union Cemetery in Bakersfield.

His gravesite was discovered in 2009 by members of the Kern County Genealogical Society. On May 1, 2010, the Oregon-California Trails Association (OCTA) California/Nevada Chapter in cooperation with the Kern County Historical Society (KCHS) installed a historical plaque at the gravesite of Elijah Stephens.

== Home of Elisha Stevens and California Historical Landmark ==
Site of The Home of Elisha Stevens
- Interactive map of Site of The Home of Elisha Stevens
- 35°23′51″N 119°00′22″W
- Location: West Columbus and Isla Verde Street in Bakersfield, in Kern County, California

California Historical Landmark
- Official name: Site of the home of Elisha Stevens
- Designated: April 8, 1960
- Reference no.: 732

The Site of the Home of Elisha Stevens' is a California Historical Landmark number 732. The site is located at the corner of West Columbus and Isla Verde Street in Bakersfield, California. The site became a California State Historical Landmark No. 732 on April 8, 1960.

California State Historical Landmark reads:

"Near this spot stood the last home of Elisha Stevens, noted American pathfinder and scout. Born in Georgia April 5, 1804, he learned blacksmithing during his youth - then, drifting west, he became a trapper on the upper Missouri for more than two decades. In 1844, he led the 50-member Murphy-Townsend wagon train safely from Council Bluffs, Iowa to Sutter's Fort. During the Mexican War he served as an ordnance mechanic under Commodore Stockton. For a time he lived in Santa Clara County, then settled here on a 38-acre tract, the first permanent settler in the Bakersfield district. He died September 9, 1887, and is buried in Union Cemetery"

— No. 732 Site Of The Home of Elisha Stevens

X

== See also ==
- California Historical Landmarks in Kern County
- California Historical Landmark
