= Desert Springs =

Desert Springs may refer to:

- Desert Springs, Northern Territory, Australia
- Desert Springs, Arizona, an unincorporated community that shares a post office with Beaver Dam, Arizona, US
- “Desert Springs”, an episode of the US TV show Without a Trace
- Desert Springs, Inc, owner of the former TV station KPDC-LP in Indio, California, US
- Desert Springs Cricket Ground, cricket ground in Spain

== See also ==
- Desert Spring (disambiguation)
- Desert Hot Springs
