= Indian Wells (Kern County, California) =

Historical landmark in California, USA

- Location within California
- 35.668°N 117.872°W
- Location: Indian Wells Lodge, 2565 Aerospace Highway, near Inyokern, California

California Historical Landmark
- Reference no.: 457

An Indian Wells California Historical Landmark was erected near the Indian Wells Lodge, 4.9 miles north of Freeman Junction on Highway 14 where William L. Manly found water after his group left Death Valley.

This marker was placed by California Centennials Commission in cooperation with Kern County Historical Society and dedicated on July 9, 1950. This site is California Historical Landmark #457.

The inscription on the plaque reads:

Indian water hole on Joseph R. Walker trail of 1834 where Manly-Jayhawker parties of 1849 found their first water after five days of travel from Argus Range. During 1860s was site of stage and freight station from Los Angeles to Coso and Cerro Gordo mines.

== See also ==
- List of California Historical Landmarks
- California Historical Landmarks in Kern County
- California Historical Landmark
