= Desert Spring, California =

Desert Spring
- Former settlement
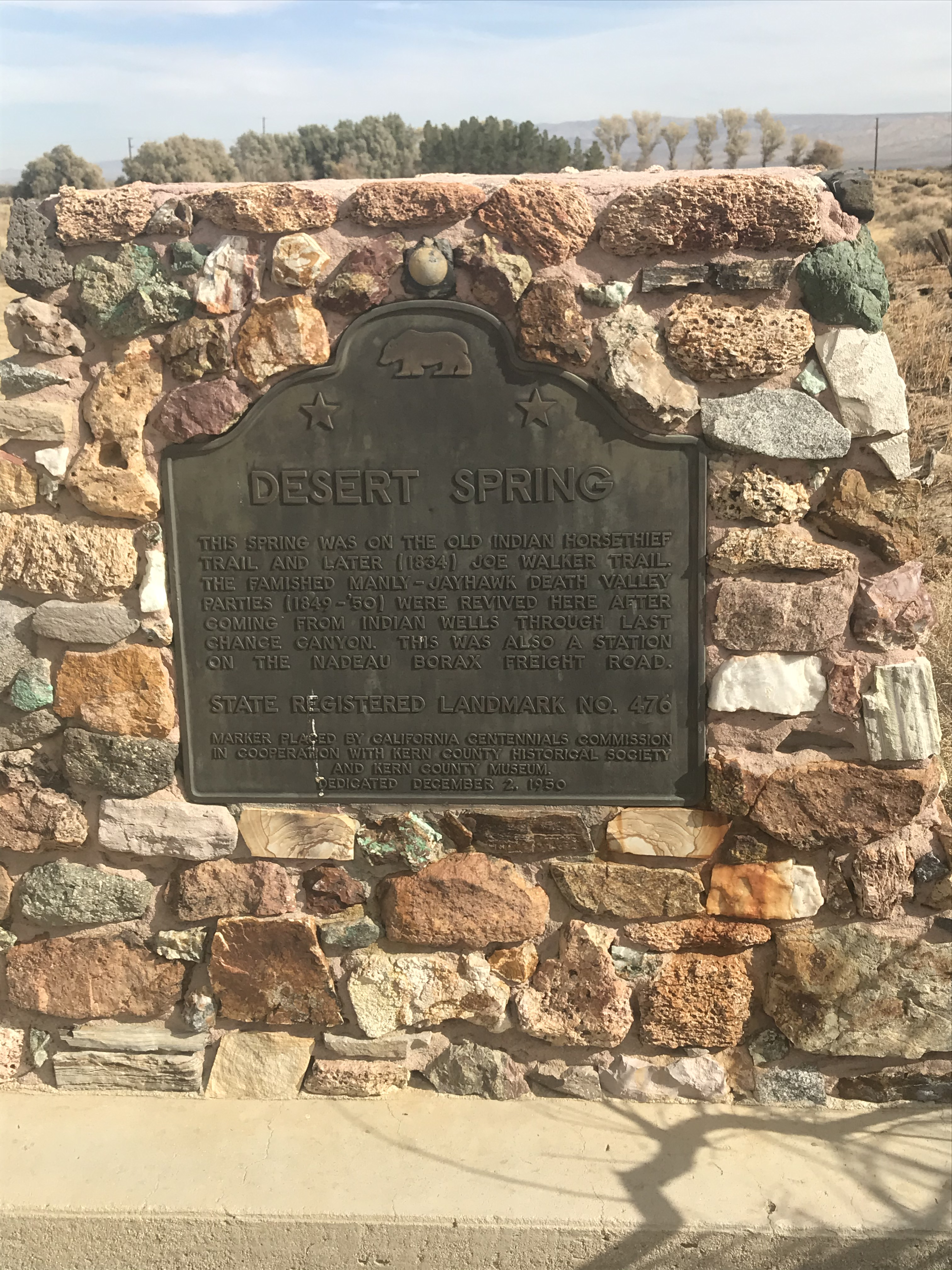
- The California Historic Landmark plaque for Desert Spring

- Location in California Desert Spring (the United States)
- Coordinates: 35°18′06″N 117°57′15″W
- Country: United States
- State: California
- County: Kern

California Historical Landmark
- Reference no.: 476

Desert Spring is a former settlement in Kern County, California, United States, in the Fremont Valley, south of Red Rock Canyon State Park. It was located 1.5 miles (2.4 km) northeast of Cantil.

The place, with natural springs, was important as a source of fresh water to the Native Americans, explorers, prospectors, and others in the Mojave Desert. Visitors included Joseph R. Walker in 1834, John C. Fremont in 1844, and migrants entering California in 1850 who had used the El Paso Range route. Later in the 19th century the water source was used by "ore freighters and prospectors".

The site is now registered as California Historical Landmark #476.

California Historical Landmark reads:

NO. 476 DESERT SPRING - This spring was on an old Indian horse thief trail and later (1834) Joe Walker Trail. The famished Manly-Jayhawk Death Valley parties (1849-50) were revived here after coming from Indian Wells through Last Chance Canyon. This was also a station on the Nadeau Borax Freight Road.

== See also ==
- Death Valley '49ers
- California Historical Landmarks in Kern County
- California Historical Landmark
