= Oak Creek Pass =

Mountain pass through Tehachapi Mountains, California

- Location within California
- Elevation: 4,820 feet (1,470 m)
- Traversed by: Tehachapi Willow Springs Road

Third Approach
- Location: Tehachapi, California, United States
- Range: Tehachapi Mountains
- Coordinates: 35.061°N 118.389°W

California Historical Landmark
- Reference no.: 97

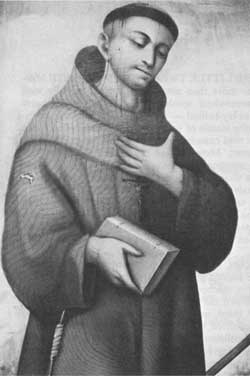
Francisco Garcés in 1775, first European to use the pass

Oak Creek Pass (elevation 4,820 feet (1,470 m)) is a mountain pass through the Tehachapi Mountains, in Kern County, California. The road across it connects the City of Tehachapi with the Mojave Desert.

== History ==
The first European to use the pass was Francisco Garces in 1776, who used it to return to the Mojave Desert after exploring the San Joaquin Valley.

It was later used by John C. Frémont during his exploration of the west from 1843 to 1844. Like Garces, he also used it to cross from the San Joaquin Valley to the Mojave Desert. That route would also later be used by present-day California State Route 58.

Oak Creek Pass was the only route between the San Joaquin Valley and the Mojave Desert over the Tehachapi Mountains until 1876, when the railroad was built to the north through Tehachapi Pass. Ironically, the railroad was built on the 100th anniversary of Garces first use of the pass.

Oak Creek Pass is a California Historical Landmark (# 97), date of registration March 29, 1933.

The California Historical Landmark reads:

NO. 97 OAK CREEK PASS - In 1776, Father Francisco Garcés used the Oak Creek Pass to return to the Mojave after exploring the San Joaquin Valley, as did Frémont in 1844-1845. Until the railroad was built through the Tehachapi Pass in 1876, Oak Creek Pass was the only route used through the Tehachapi Mountains.

== See also ==
- California Historical Landmarks in Kern County
- California Historical Landmark
