= Walker Basin =

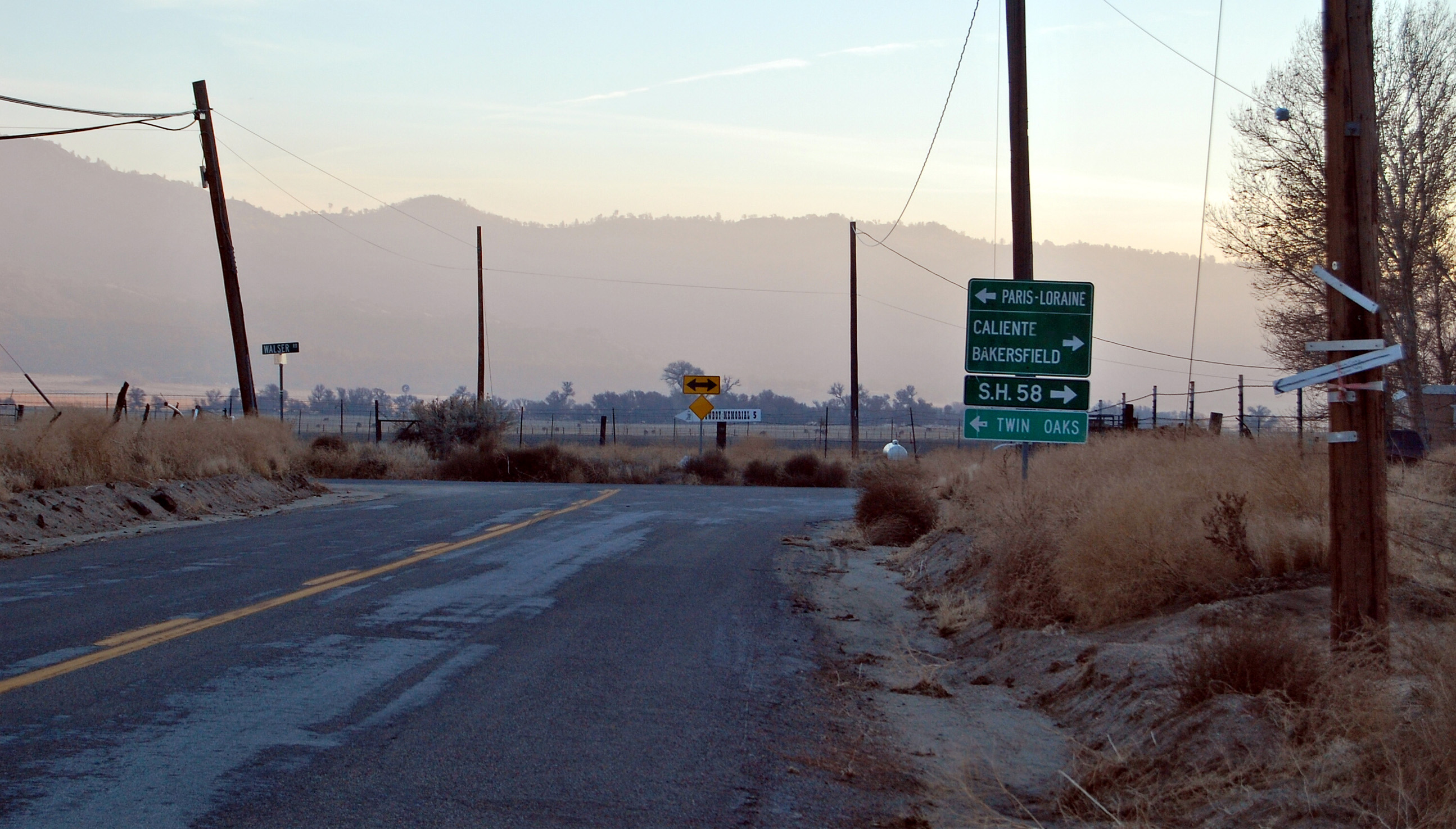
- South view of Caliente Bodfish/Walser roads intersection in the basin

- Location within California
- Floor elevation: 3,376 ft (1,029 m)
- Area: 10–11 square miles (26–28 km^{2})

Geography
- Location: California, United States
- District: Kern County
- Borders on: Breckenridge Mountain (west); Piute Mountain (northeast)
- Coordinates: 35°24′35″N 118°31′17″W
- Interactive map of Walker Basin

Walker Basin is a valley in the Southern Sierra Nevada, in Kern County, California. It is named for Joseph R. Walker, a pioneer in the area.

== Geography ==
Walker Basin is located south of Lake Isabella and the Kern River Valley, east of Bakersfield, and north of Tehachapi Pass, near the southern boundary of the Sequoia National Forest. It is framed by Breckenridge Mountain at 7,548 feet (2,301 m) on the west side and Piute Mountain on the east. The community of Havilah is to the north up a canyon, and the communities of Fig Orchard and Millersville are to the south over a ridge.
