= Delonegha Hot Springs =

Geothermal site in California

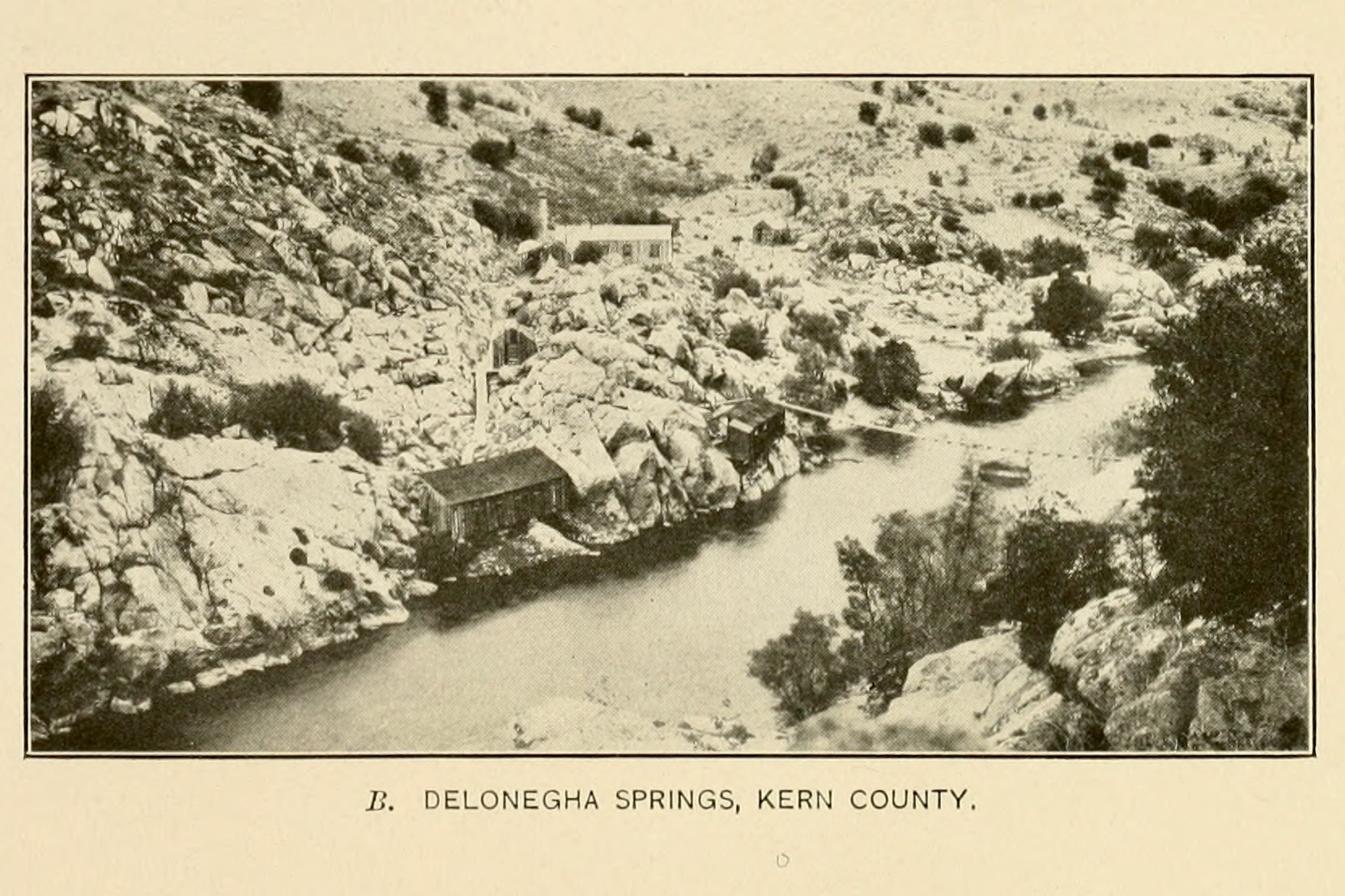
- Delonegha Springs c. 1909; the swinging bridge persisted until at least 1975
- Interactive map of Delonegha Hot Springs
- Coordinates: 35.558°N 118.612°W
- Elevation: 641 metres (2,103 ft)
- Type: Thermal
- Discharge: 95 L/min (25 U.S. gal/min)
- Temperature: 44 °C (111 °F)

Delonegha Hot Springs are located in Kern County, California, United States, northeast of the city of Bakersfield and southwest of Lake Isabella. Delonegha is one of several hot springs adjacent to the Kern River and State Route 178. The springs lie within the boundaries of Sequoia National Forest, "100 yd (91 m) down a steep dirt trail" from the highway. Except for a brief period in the first years of the 20th century when there was a small resort at the site, the Delonegha springs have remained largely undeveloped.

== History ==
The geothermally heated groundwater at Delonegha (also spelled Delonagha) was known to the indigenous people of the area, who reportedly used them "for medicinal purposes". The springs take their name from the Dahlonegah Mining District where gold was found in 1866. Dahlonegah was in turn named after Dahlonega, Georgia, itself the site of an early 19th-century gold rush. In the late 1860s, the first settlers of the springs district built a road to the top of Greenhorn Mountain "to connect with Eugene and Burke Grades" leading to Poso Flats and then into Bakersfield. A stage ran this road twice a week.

Homesteader William Crawford took possession of the springs and surrounding land in 1886, and according to his daughter, "Hot water poured out of the middle of big rocks and splashed into the river. I guess it still does. Papa built the bath house and the tubs on the edge of the river and piped water to it from a big spring up the mountain." The springs were remote, accessible only by a single terrible road, and the surrounding land was still almost entirely wild, and populated by native California fauna including mountain lions, bobcats, foxes, bears, rattlesnakes, and scorpions. A historian who interviewed Crawford's daughter Mae in 1965 wrote that "Miners and homesteaders stopped by occasionally. Most took baths in the bath house built by Mr. Crawford, soaking in the concrete tub filled with hot spring water, then lying, blanket-wrapped, on the sweat-board for an hour or so. Some bought cheese, goat's milk, and goat meat, and the family income was further augmented by the sale of the tough little burros to sheepherders." After the Kern River flooded out the Crawford family for the third time, William Crawford "mortgaged the Springs to H. H. Fish, the man he was driving a hack for in Bakersfield, so he'd have the money to repair things with". When Crawford defaulted on the mortgage, Fish evicted the family from the land. Fish then leased Delonegha to Simeon and Dell Hill in about 1898. The Hills built "a hotel, boarding house, several dwellings, and a bath," and the resort flourished for a time, particularly in 1905 and 1906. According to a history of Kern County, "Hotel guests paid by the week, ate at the boardinghouse and bathed in the effervescent waters of the mineral springs. In spring, the hillsides around the resort blazed with orange poppies, blue lupine, and stately waxen yuccas. The thick trees and mountain shrubs shaded the resort from the summer sun and in the damp, shadowed places near the springs grew a multitude of violets." However, in 1905, a new road was constructed between Bodfish and Democrat Hot Springs that bypassed Delongha and, over time, their resort business collapsed. A young visitor who was there in 1909 later recalled "the steep ride down the mountain from the cow camp to the Springs, the handsome hotel with wide, shaded verandas, and the bustle of guests." However, business was already in decline and the hotel closed by 1912.

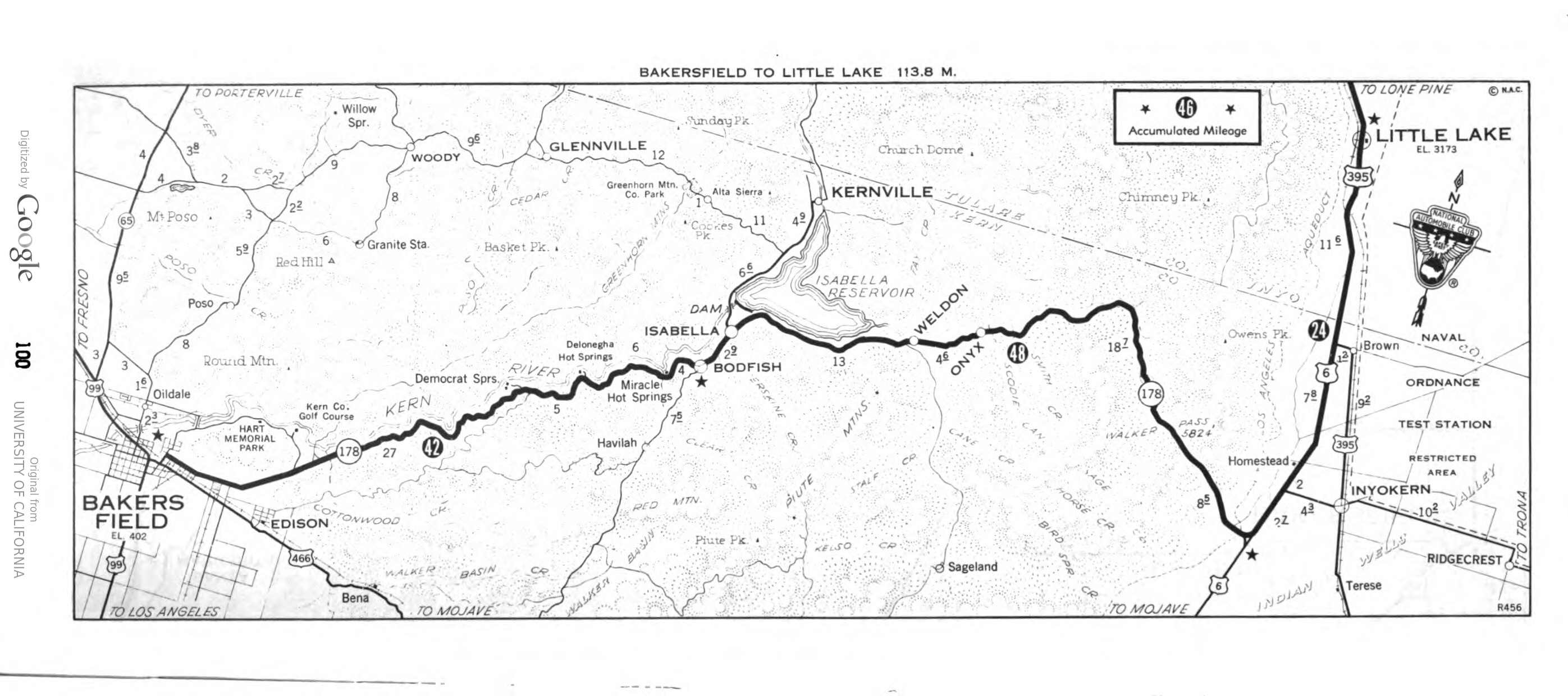
Delonegha Springs on a map of the route between Bakersfield and Little Lake, 1959

Local historians who visited the site in 1956 found that "several dwellings remain intact and a small bathhouse is all that remains of the 'curative' pools, but the picturesque swinging footbridge across the Kern River that charmed a generation of years ago still spans the river, sturdy and exciting. Another item of nostalgia was the discovery of signs posted on nearby boulders in the heyday of the springs by early merchants in Bakersfield: the Toggery, Hochheimer's Department Store, Harrington's and C. N. Johnston's Blacksmith Shop, businesses that faded from the Bakersfield scene long ago."

As of 1967, the property was owned by B. N. Kershaw but was "not at present open to the public". In the 1970s, one side of the spring rock had no place for soaking tubs so visitors used hoses to move water into porcelain bathtubs put in the river, and built a masonry soaking pool on the east side of the big rock. Today, springs lie within the boundaries of the Sequoia National Forest, and the old bath tubs were destroyed by U.S. Forest Service as a public safety measure in June 1977.

== Water profile ==
The spring vent is "under a giant rock just above water level," and the water from both sides of said big rock. According to a U.S. government geologist in 1915, "At the western edge of Kern River, about 6 miles below the Clear Creek Springs, is a group of three hot springs that are called after a prospector named Delonegha. These springs issue a few feet above the river surface from crevices in fractured, massive granite. The water is distinctly sulphureted, but it does not seem to be otherwise notably mineralized. In 1908 there was a resort here, consisting of a small hotel and two bathhouses. The flow of two of the springs was collected in cement basins and used in the bathhouses, which were perched on the rocks above the river. The third spring issues too close to the river to be easily available." A geothermal research project sponsored by NOAA found that the temperature of Delonegha water is 44 °C (111 °F) when it emerges from the source. Flow rate is approximately 95 liters per minute.

== See also ==
- Miracle Hot Springs
- Remington Hot Springs
- Kern Canyon Fault
