= Rudy Salas =

American politician (born 1977)

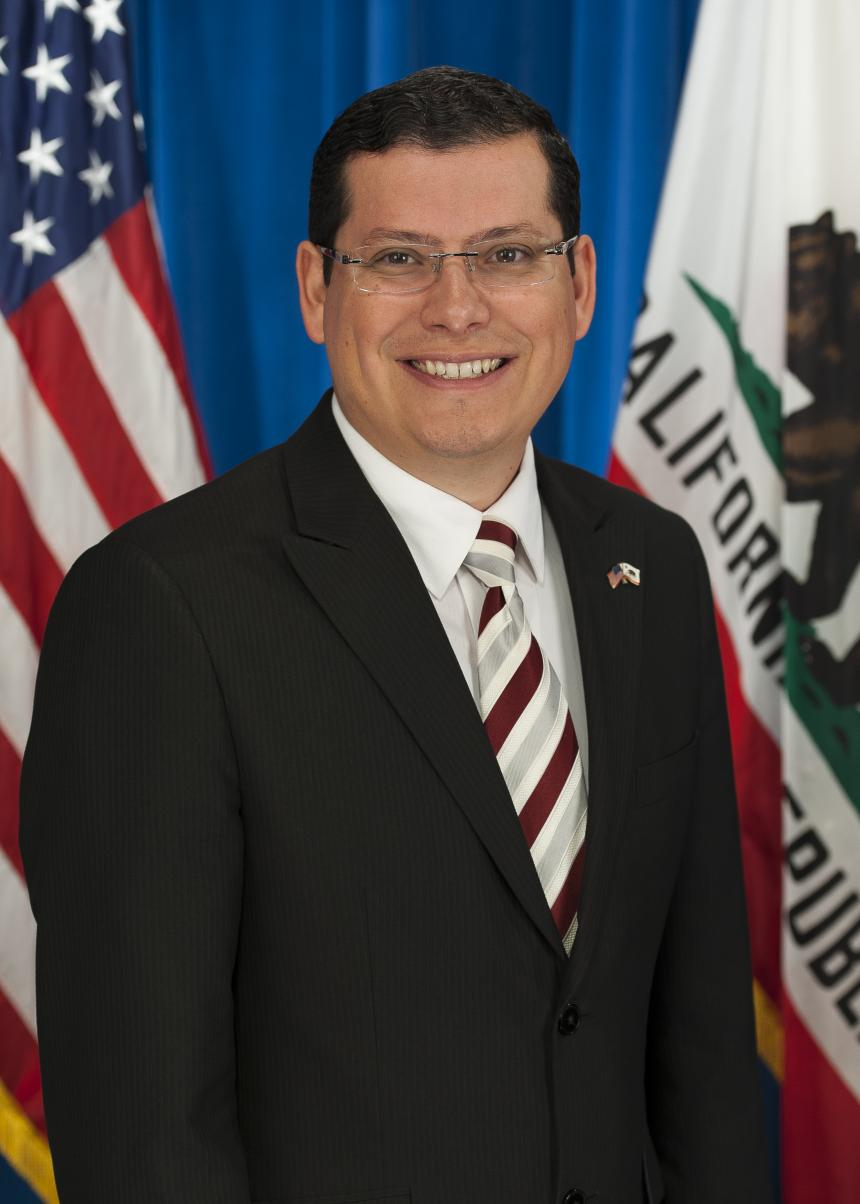
- Official portrait, 2015

Member of the California State Assembly from the 32nd district
- In office December 3, 2012 – December 5, 2022
- Preceded by: Shannon Grove (redistricting)
- Succeeded by: Vince Fong (redistricting)

Personal details
- Born: Rodolfo Salas; March 12, 1977 (age 49) Bakersfield, California, U.S.
- Party: Democratic
- Education: University of California, Los Angeles (BA)
- Website: Campaign website

Rodolfo "Rudy" Salas (born March 12, 1977) is an American politician who served in the California State Assembly from 2012 to 2022. A member of the Democratic Party, he represented the 32nd Assembly district, which encompasses Kings County and parts of northwestern Kern County. Prior to being elected to the Assembly, he was on the Bakersfield City Council.

Salas left his seat in the Assembly to run as the Democratic nominee for California's 22nd congressional district in 2022, losing to incumbent Republican David Valadao. Salas ran again in 2024 for the 22nd congressional district, losing once again to Valadao.

== Early life and education ==
Salas was born and raised in southeastern Bakersfield, California. He worked for his family's construction business. He went to South High School in Bakersfield.

After graduating from high school, Salas attended the University of California, Los Angeles. He earned a bachelor of arts degree in history and political science in 2000. He then worked at the White House under Vice President Al Gore for a year.

== Early career ==
Following his time in Washington D.C., Salas returned to California and worked as a counselor for the Upward Bound Program at California State University, Bakersfield. He later switched to government, and served as district director for State Senator Dean Florez from 2004 to 2010.

Salas made history in 2010 by becoming the first Latino elected to the Bakersfield City Council. Two years later, he was elected to represent Bakersfield in the California State Assembly, leaving the City Council to serve in Sacramento.

== California State Assembly ==
=== Elections ===
==== 2012 ====
California's 32nd State Assembly district in green

When incumbent Assemblyman David Valadao announced that he would not run for reelection for California's 32nd State Assembly district, instead seeking a congressional bid, the seat was left vacant. In the June 5 primary, Salas ran unopposed for the Democratic nomination of the 32nd assembly district and won the overall primary with 41.4% of the vote, or 13,053 votes, ahead of the three Republican candidates. He faced off against the primary runner-up, Republican former Delano Mayor Pedro Rios, in the November 6 general election. Salas came in first by a smaller margin than before, with 38,759 total votes (52.9%) to Rios's 34,476 (47.1%). He was sworn in on December 3, 2012.

==== 2014 ====
Salas ran for re-election in November 2014, again against former Delano Mayor Pedro Rios, who defeated Delano Union School Board trustee Romeo Agbalog in the June 2014 Republican primary election. He was described as a moderate Democrat, colloquially referred to as a "Valleycrat" by some. He won the rematch in the November 4 general election with 54.8% to Rios's 45.2%.

==== 2016 ====
Salas ran for a third term in 2016. He faced minimal opposition in the primary, with Republican Manuel Ramirez running a write-in campaign that garnered 1% of the primary vote. In the general election, he won his largest victory yet with 65% to Ramirez's 35%.

==== 2018 ====
Salas ran for a fourth consecutive term in 2018. He was challenged by Republican Hanford City Councilman Justin Mendes, a staffer for Congressman David Valadao (whom Salas succeeded in the Assembly in 2012).

==== 2020 ====
Salas ran for reelection and faced Republican Todd Cotta, a Hanford gun store owner in the general election.

== U.S. House campaigns ==
=== Elections ===
==== 2022 ====
2022 U.S. House election results

Salas left his seat in the State Assembly to run for California's 22nd congressional district in 2022. He was defeated by incumbent Republican David Valadao in a close race.

==== 2024 ====
Salas announced he would run again for Congress in 2024. He was defeated by incumbent Republican David Valadao in the 2024 general election by over 11,000 votes.

== Electoral history ==
2012 California State Assembly 32nd district election
Primary election
| Party | Candidate | Votes | % |
|---|---|---|---|
| Democratic | Rudy Salas | 13,053 | 41.4 |
| Republican | Pedro A. Rios | 7,550 | 23.9 |
| Republican | Jon McQuiston | 6,530 | 20.7 |
| Republican | David Thomas | 4,420 | 14.0 |
| Total votes | | 31,553 | 100.0 |
General election
| Democratic | Rudy Salas | 38,759 | 52.9 |
| Republican | Pedro A. Rios | 34,476 | 47.1 |
| Total votes | | 73,235 | 100.0 |
| Democratic gain from Republican | | | |

2014 California State Assembly 32nd district election
Primary election
| Party | Candidate | Votes | % |
|---|---|---|---|
| Democratic | Rudy Salas (incumbent) | 11,577 | 43.9 |
| Republican | Pedro A. Rios | 9,183 | 34.8 |
| Republican | Romeo Agbalog | 5,628 | 21.3 |
| Total votes | | 26,388 | 100.0 |
General election
| Democratic | Rudy Salas (incumbent) | 26,721 | 54.8 |
| Republican | Pedro A. Rios | 22,031 | 45.2 |
| Total votes | | 48,752 | 100.0 |
| Democratic hold | | | |

2016 California State Assembly 32nd district election
Primary election
| Party | Candidate | Votes | % |
|---|---|---|---|
| Democratic | Rudy Salas (incumbent) | 30,806 | 98.9 |
| Republican | Manuel Ramirez (write-in) | 334 | 1.1 |
| Total votes | | 31,140 | 100.0 |
General election
| Democratic | Rudy Salas (incumbent) | 53,056 | 65.1 |
| Republican | Manuel Ramirez | 28,502 | 34.9 |
| Total votes | | 81,558 | 100.0 |
| Democratic hold | | | |

2018 California State Assembly 32nd district election
Primary election
| Party | Candidate | Votes | % |
|---|---|---|---|
| Democratic | Rudy Salas (incumbent) | 16,690 | 50.4 |
| Republican | Justin Mendes | 16,438 | 49.6 |
| Total votes | | 33,128 | 100.0 |
General election
| Democratic | Rudy Salas (incumbent) | 39,328 | 56.7 |
| Republican | Justin Mendes | 30,089 | 43.3 |
| Total votes | | 69,417 | 100.0 |
| Democratic hold | | | |

2020 California State Assembly 32nd district election
Primary election
| Party | Candidate | Votes | % |
|---|---|---|---|
| Democratic | Rudy Salas (incumbent) | 27,679 | 58.1 |
| Republican | Todd Cotta | 19,957 | 41.9 |
| Total votes | | 47,636 | 100.0 |
General election
| Democratic | Rudy Salas (incumbent) | 63,450 | 60.0 |
| Republican | Todd Cotta | 42,328 | 40.0 |
| Total votes | | 105,778 | 100.0 |
| Democratic hold | | | |

2022 California's 22nd congressional district election
Primary election
| Party | Candidate | Votes | % |
|---|---|---|---|
| Democratic | Rudy Salas | 25,337 | 45.2 |
| Republican | David Valadao (incumbent) | 14,331 | 25.6 |
| Republican | Chris Mathys | 13,111 | 23.4 |
| Republican | Adam Medeiros | 3,250 | 5.8 |
| Total votes | | 56,029 | 100.0 |
General election
| Republican | David Valadao (incumbent) | 52,994 | 51.5 |
| Democratic | Rudy Salas | 49,862 | 48.5 |
| Total votes | | 102,856 | 100.0 |
| Republican hold | | | |

2024 California's 22nd congressional district election
Primary election
| Party | Candidate | Votes | % |
|---|---|---|---|
| Republican | David Valadao (incumbent) | 20,479 | 32.7 |
| Democratic | Rudy Salas | 19,592 | 31.3 |
| Republican | Chris Mathys | 13,745 | 22.0 |
| Democratic | Melissa Hurtado | 8,733 | 14.0 |
| Total votes | | 62,549 | 100.0 |
General election
| Republican | David Valadao (incumbent) | 89,484 | 53.4 |
| Democratic | Rudy Salas | 78,023 | 46.6 |
| Total votes | | 167,507 | 100.0 |
| Republican hold | | | |

California Assembly
| Preceded by David Valadao | Member of the California State Assembly from the 32nd district 2012–2022 | Succeeded by Vince Fong |
