= Remington Hot Springs =

Thermal spring in Kern County, California

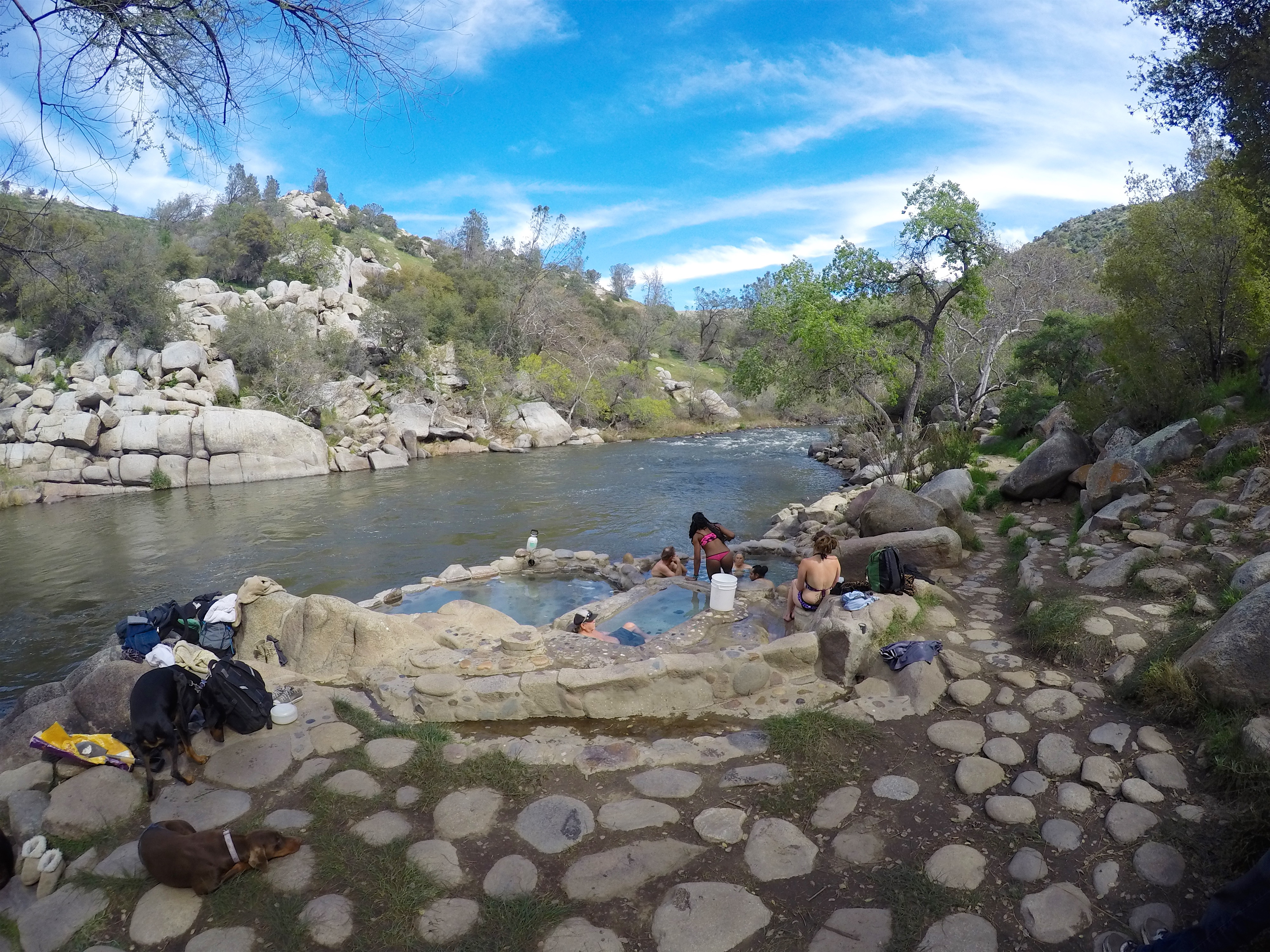
- Remington Hot Springs
- Interactive map of Remington Hot Springs
- Location: near Bodfish, California in the Sequoia National Forest
- Coordinates: 35°34′40″N 118°33′11″W
- Elevation: 2,217 feet (676 m)
- Type: geothermal
- Temperature: 80 °F (27 °C) to 115 °F (46 °C)

Remington Hot Springs are an undeveloped thermal spring system located on the banks of the Kern River near Bodfish, California and Lake Isabella in the Sequoia National Forest in Kern County.

== Description ==
There are four rock and cement lined soaking pools at the site. The small Miners Tub is located 50 feet above the larger three pools which are located at the river's edge. The hot springs are maintained by volunteers, the Kern River Hot Springs Angels. The Angels periodically power wash the hot springs soaking tubs in the area.

The springs are approximately one-and-one-half miles from Miracle Hot Springs. The three lower soaking pools are known for their "elaborate stone masonry work." Areas of the cement are embedded with "colored stones and jewelry, and "the word "Paradise" as is written in one of the steps leading to the pools."

The three lower soaking pools consist of a 3'x7' rectangular pool, a 6'x8' oval pool, and an 8'x12' teardrop shaped soaking pool. Two of the pools have stone benches, and all three have stone and cement bottoms with drains that are used for cleaning. The upper spring Miners Tub is smaller, and built of stone and cement set against a boulder.

== Location ==
The springs are located in Old Kern Canyon, 2 miles west of Hobo Campground. A hiking trail descends 1/4 mile downward to the hot springs.

== History ==
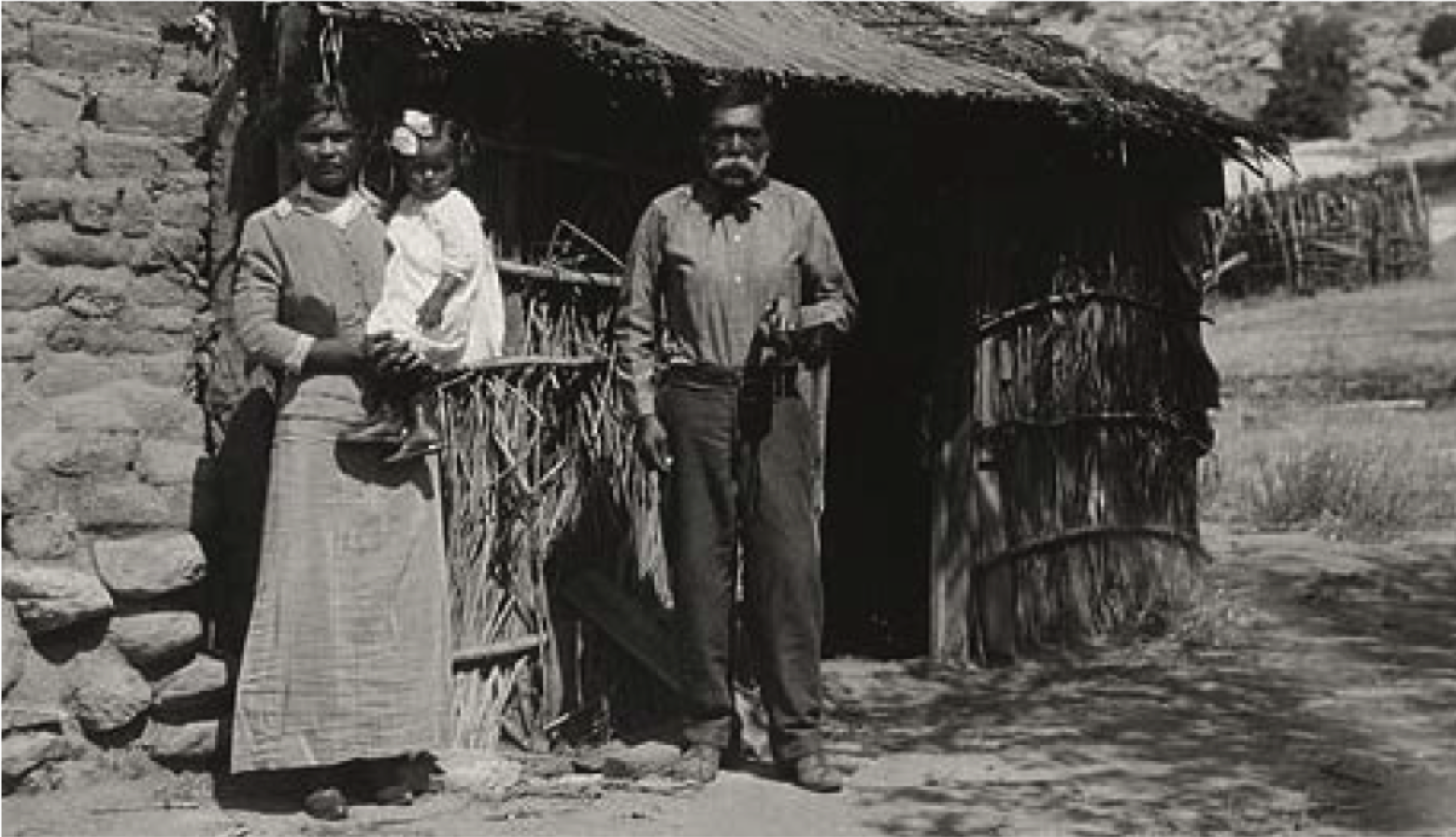
Tübatulabal family in the Kern River area in 1916

This area of the Kern River was inhabited by local Indigenous peoples including the Tübatulabal, who often built villages near springs. The Tübatulabal used the springs in the area for thousands of years and hunted, fished, and raised their families, along the banks for the river.

During the California Gold Rush miners used the hot springs.

Over the years, the hot spring waters were considered to have "healing powers."

There is no remaining development at the hot springs.

== See also ==
- Miracle Hot Springs
- Scovern Hot Springs
- List of hot springs in the United States
- Kern Canyon Fault

== Water Profile ==
The water emerges from the various spring sources at a range of approximately 80 °F (27 °C) to 115 °F (46 °C). Another account measured the temperature of the source of the spring at 106 °F (41 °C) which cools to about 100 °F (38 °C) as it flows into the soaking pools. The upper spring emerges from the source at 86 °F (30 °C) to 90 °F (32 °C).
