= Bodfish, California =

Bodfish
- census-designated place
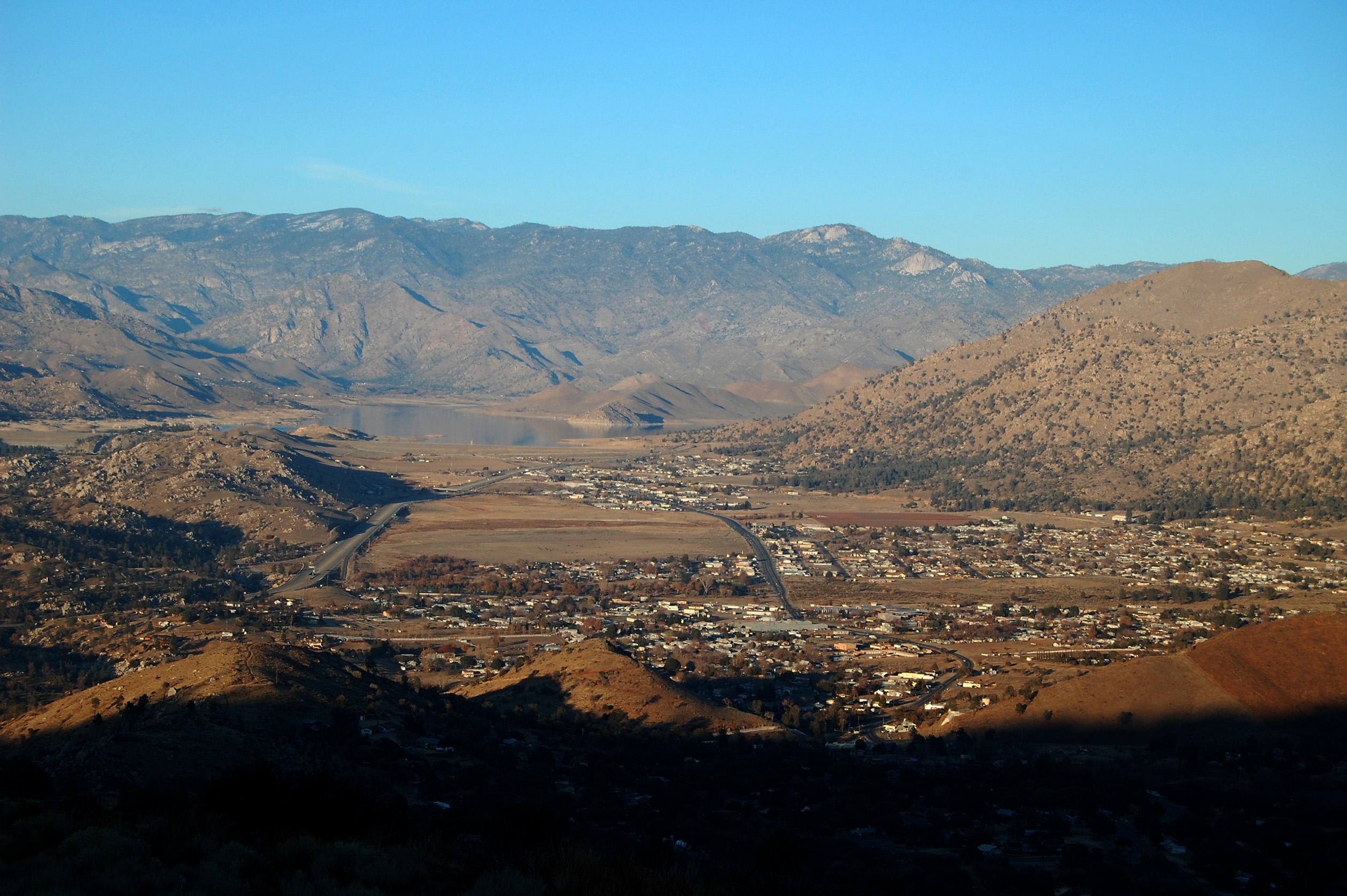
- View of Bodfish from Caliente-Bodfish Road in the hills west of town

- Location in Kern County and the state of California

- Location in the United States
- Coordinates: 35°35′17″N 118°29′31″W
- Country: United States
- State: California
- County: Kern

Government
  - State senator: Shannon Grove (R)
  - Assemblymember: Stan Ellis (R)
  - U. S. rep.: Vince Fong (R)

Area
  - Total: 8.23 sq mi (21.31 km^{2})
  - Land: 8.21 sq mi (21.27 km^{2})
  - Water: 0.012 sq mi (0.03 km^{2}) 0.15%
- Elevation: 2,687 ft (819 m)

Population (2020)
  - Total: 2,008
  - Density: 244.5/sq mi (94.39/km^{2})
- Time zone: UTC-8 (PST)
  - Summer (DST): UTC-7 (PDT)
- ZIP code: 93205
- Area codes: 442/760
- FIPS code: 06-07274
- GNIS feature ID: 1660353

Bodfish is a census-designated place (CDP) in the southern Kern River Valley of the Southern Sierra Nevada, in Kern County, California, United States.

Bodfish is located 32 miles (51 km) east-northeast of Bakersfield, at an elevation of 2,687 feet (819 m).

The population was 2,008 at the 2020 census, up from 1,956 at the 2010 census.

== History ==
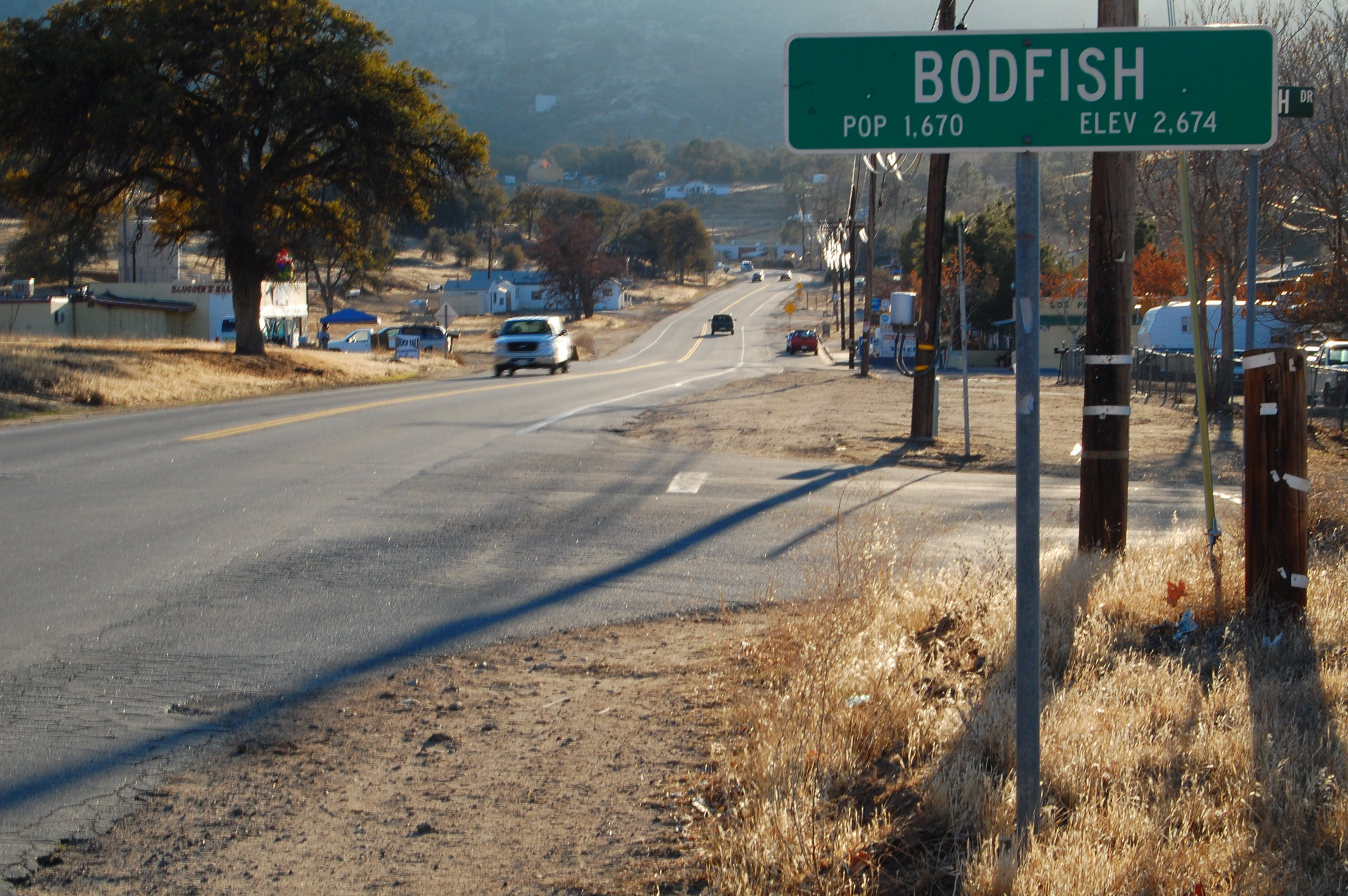
Guide sign along Lake Isabella Boulevard at the east extent of Bodfish

The place was named for George Homer Bodfish, who settled nearby in 1867.

The Bodfish post office first opened in 1892, closed in 1895, and re-opened in 1906. The Vaughn post office was moved to Bodfish in 1906.

== Demographics ==
Historical population
Census	Pop.	Note	%±
1980	1,379		—
1990	1,283		−7.0%
2000	1,823		42.1%
2010	1,956		7.3%
2020	2,008		2.7%
U.S. Decennial Census; 1860–1870 1880-1890; 1900 1910 1920; 1930 1940 1950; 1960 1970 1980; 1990 2000 2010; 2020

Bodfish first appeared as a census designated place in the 1980 United States census.

=== Racial and ethnic composition ===
Bodfish CDP, California – Racial and ethnic composition Note: the US Census treats Hispanic/Latino as an ethnic category. This table excludes Latinos from the racial categories and assigns them to a separate category. Hispanics/Latinos may be of any race.
Race / Ethnicity (NH = Non-Hispanic)	Pop 2000	Pop 2010	Pop 2020	% 2000	% 2010	% 2020
White alone (NH)	1,607	1,643	1,602	88.15%	84.00%	79.78%
Black or African American alone (NH)	3	4	21	0.16%	0.20%	1.05%
Native American or Alaska Native alone (NH)	40	42	32	2.19%	2.15%	1.59%
Asian alone (NH)	11	13	18	0.60%	0.66%	0.90%
Native Hawaiian or Pacific Islander alone (NH)	1	3	2	0.05%	0.15%	0.10%
Other race alone (NH)	0	5	13	0.00%	0.26%	0.65%
Mixed race or Multiracial (NH)	62	57	108	3.40%	2.91%	5.38%
Hispanic or Latino (any race)	99	189	212	5.43%	9.66%	10.56%
Total	1,823	1,956	2,008	100.00%	100.00%	100.00%

=== 2020 census ===
As of the 2020 census, Bodfish had a population of 2,008 and a population density of 244.5 inhabitants per square mile (94.4/km^{2}).

The age distribution was 14.7% under the age of 18, 6.1% aged 18 to 24, 17.2% aged 25 to 44, 33.0% aged 45 to 64, and 29.0% who were 65 years of age or older. The median age was 55.4 years. For every 100 females, there were 111.8 males, and for every 100 females age 18 and over, there were 109.2 males age 18 and over.

The whole population lived in households. There were 958 households, of which 15.4% had children under the age of 18, 34.4% were married-couple households, 8.9% were cohabiting couple households, 27.9% had a female householder with no spouse or partner present, and 28.8% had a male householder with no spouse or partner present. Of all households, 37.7% were one-person households, and 19.0% were one-person households with someone aged 65 or older. The average household size was 2.10, and there were 511 families (53.3% of all households).

There were 1,215 housing units at an average density of 147.9 units per square mile (57.1 units/km^{2}), of which 958 (78.8%) were occupied and 21.2% were vacant. Of occupied units, 72.5% were owner-occupied and 27.5% were renter-occupied. The homeowner vacancy rate was 5.3% and the rental vacancy rate was 4.0%.

In 2020, 27.6% of residents lived in urban areas, while 72.4% lived in rural areas.

=== Income and poverty ===
In 2023, the US Census Bureau estimated that the median household income was $33,295, and the per capita income was $16,165. About 42.4% of families and 54.8% of the population were below the poverty line.
