= 1982 California Secretary of State election =

- November 2, 1982
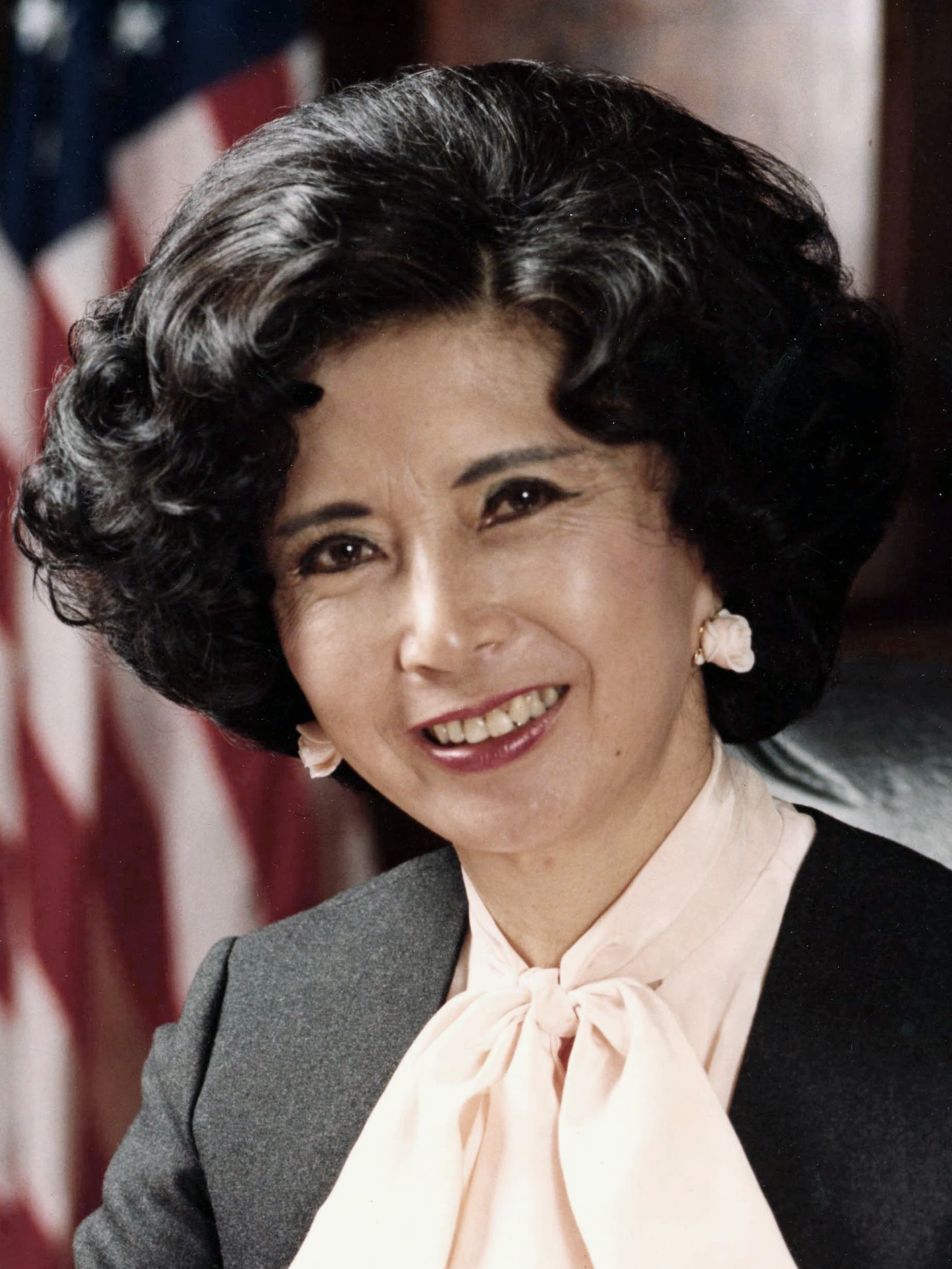

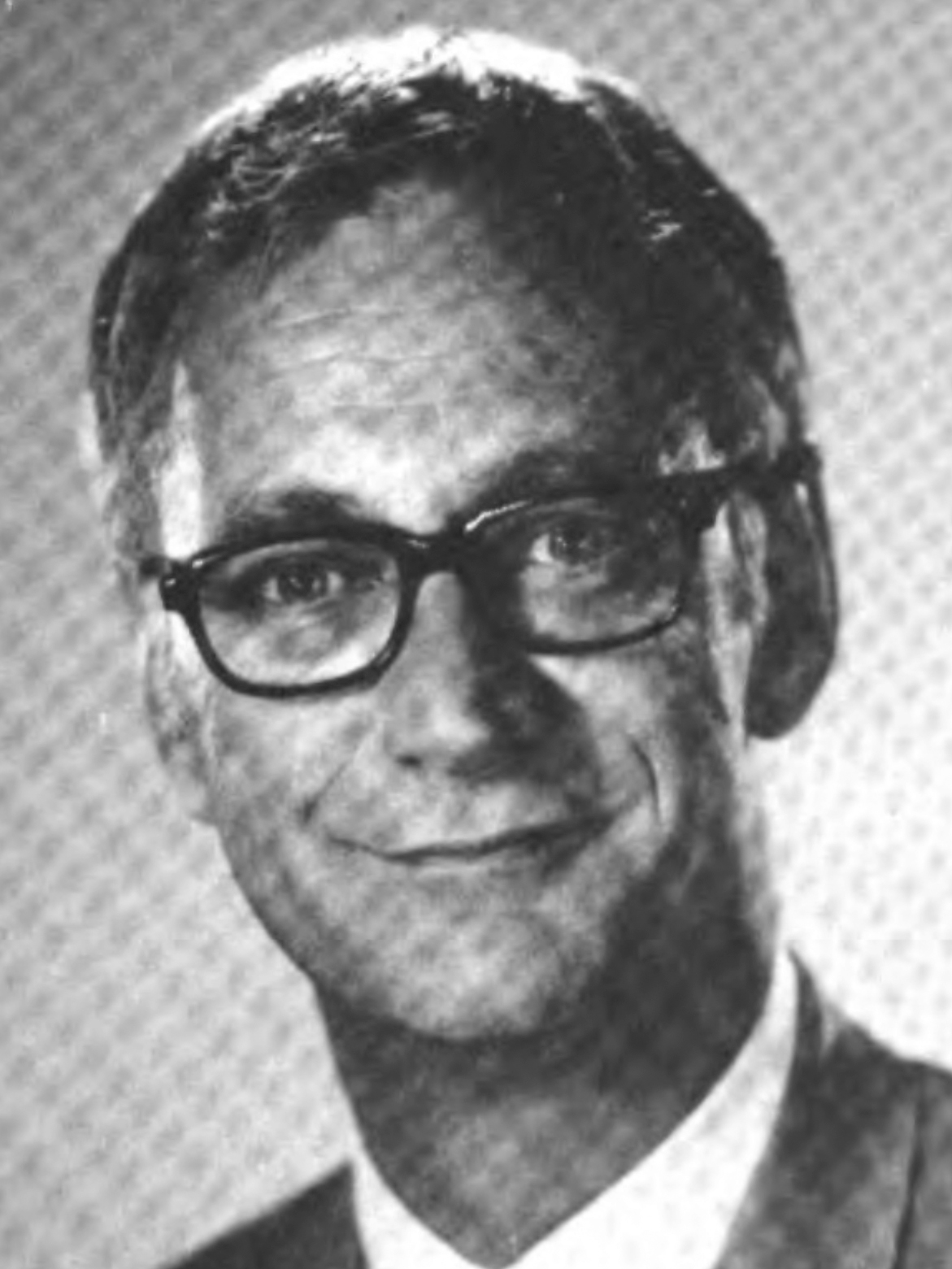
Nominee	March Fong Eu	Gordon W. Duffy
Party	Democratic	Republican
Popular vote	4,586,121	2,634,541
Percentage	60.54%	34.78%
- County results Fong Eu: 40–50% 50–60% 60–70% 70–80% Duffy: 40–50% 50–60% 60–70%
Secretary of State before election
March Fong Eu
Democratic
Elected Secretary of State
March Fong Eu
Democratic

The 1982 California Secretary of State election was held on November 2, 1982. Democratic incumbent March Fong Eu defeated Republican nominee Gordon W. Duffy with 60.54% of the vote.

== Primary elections ==
Primary elections were held on June 8, 1982.

=== Democratic primary ===
==== Candidates ====
- March Fong Eu, Secretary of State of California
- Kenneth R. Smith
- Alice Keyser
- Helen Howard

==== Results ====
Democratic primary results
Party	Candidate	Votes	%
Democratic	March Fong Eu	2,015,197	76.31
Democratic	Kenneth R. Smith	245,617	9.30
Democratic	Alice Keyser	196,908	7.46
Democratic	Helen Howard	182,951	6.93
Total votes		2,640,673	100.00

=== Republican primary ===
==== Candidates ====
- Gordon W. Duffy, State Assemblyman from Hanford
- Glenn Rose
- Jacob "Jay" Margosian

==== Results ====
Republican primary results
Party	Candidate	Votes	%
Republican	Gordon W. Duffy	1,078,658	59.21
Republican	Glenn Rose	371,632	20.40
Republican	Jacob "Jay" Margosian	371,397	20.39
Total votes		1,821,687	100.00

== General election ==
=== Candidates ===
Major party candidates

- March Fong Eu, Democratic
- Gordon W. Duffy, Republican

Other candidates

- Martin E. Buerger, Libertarian
- Alfred W. Smith, American Independent
- Milton Shiro Takei, Peace and Freedom

=== Results ===
1982 California Secretary of State election
Party	Candidate	Votes	%	±%
Democratic	March Fong Eu	4,586,121	60.54%	
Republican	Gordon W. Duffy	2,634,541	34.78%	
Libertarian	Martin E. Buerger	152,464	2.01%	
American Independent	Alfred W. Smith	103,400	1.37%	
Peace and Freedom	Milton Shiro Takei	99,400	1.31%	
Majority		1,951,580		
Turnout				
Democratic hold		Swing		
