= Miracle Hot Springs, California =

Unincorporated community in California, United States

Miracle Hot Springs Hobo Hot Springs Compressor Hot Springs Clear Creek Hot Springs
- Unincorporated community
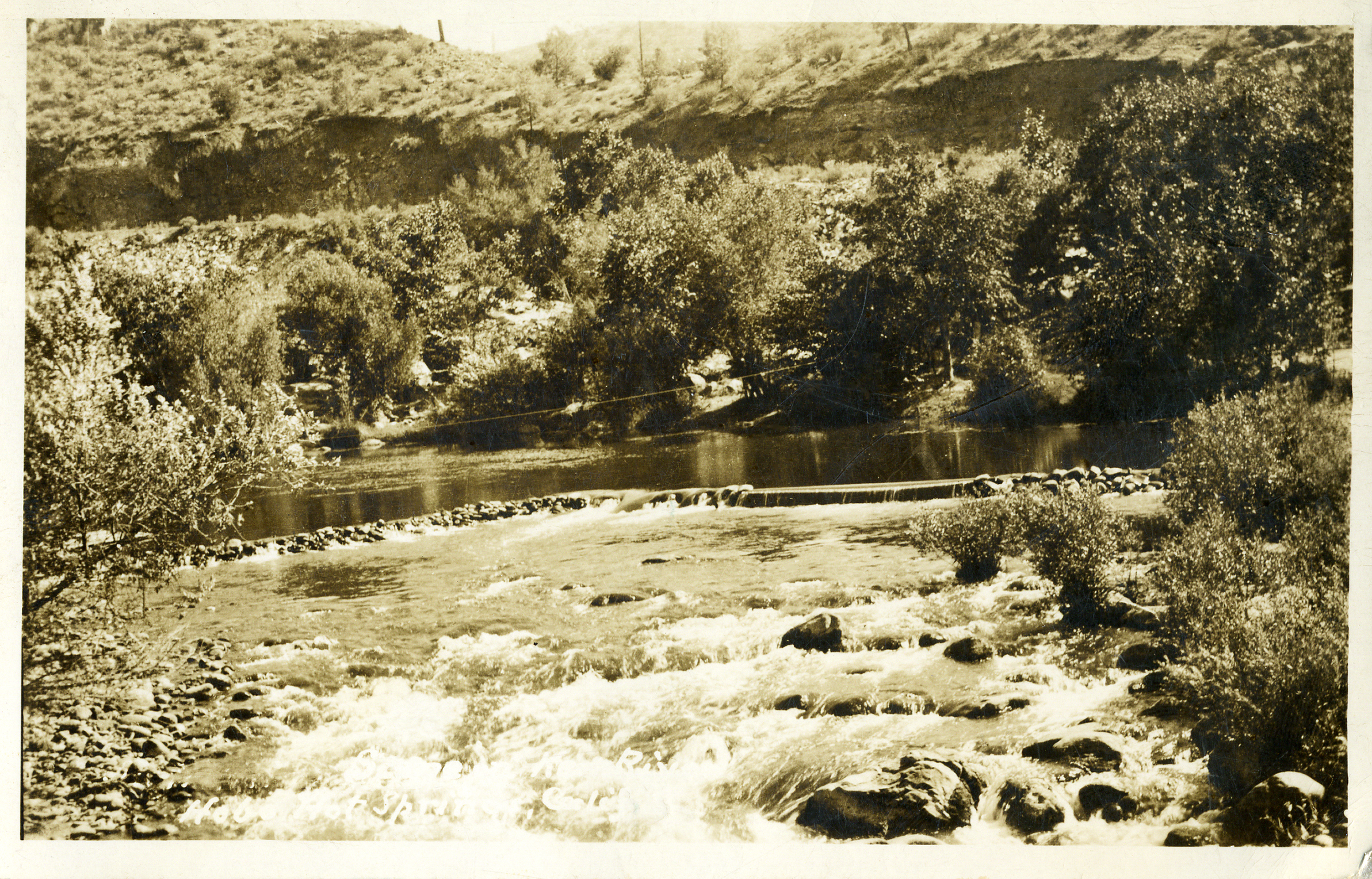
- Hobo Hot Springs on the Kern River, Miracle Hot Springs, California

- Location in California
- Coordinates: 35°34′33″N 118°32′04″W
- Country: United States
- State: California
- County: Kern
- Elevation: 2,382 ft (726 m)

Miracle Hot Springs (formerly Hobo Hot Springs; also known as Compressor Hot Springs and Clear Creek Hot Springs) is an unincorporated community in the Kern River Valley, in Kern County, California, United States. It is located along the Kern River in the Sequoia National Forest, 10 miles (16 km) west of Lake Isabella, California, at an elevation of 2,382 feet (726 m).

The earliest known name for this hot spring was Compressor, named after a turbine built by an indigenous miner. The turbine was supplied with water from Clear Creek that drove a compressor that provided air to miners working underground.

The name Hobo was based on the rancher's name for the workmen who lived there, who were accused of stealing sheep and cattle. Another account of the name Hobo Hot Springs claims that a hobo camp that included several bathhouses was built in 1901 when the Borel power plant was under construction.

== History ==
In 1927, a hotel was constructed on land leased from the U.S. Forest Service.

The Hobo Hot Springs post office opened in 1932, and changed its name to Miracle Hot Springs in 1947. The post office operated for 50 years.

In 1933 a two-lane highway was built. The nearby Delongha Hot Springs resort went defunct, whereas Miracle Hot Springs flourished.

The hotel burned down in 1975, leaving only the rock and concrete soaking pools. In 1976, a 4-lane highway was built, cutting off access to the springs. What was left of the hot springs resort fell into disrepair, and was closed. The area of the soaking pools has been prone to illegal camping, vandalism and trash; a volunteer group, the Hot Springs Angels, cleaned it and educated visitors under an agreement with the Forest Service.

The water is high in uranium and radon. After a death in October 2022, the Forest Service destroyed the pools as a public danger. The area flooded in 2023; after the river level fell, the pools were reconstructed without permission. Another death in February 2024 led the Forest Service to again destroy the pools and to announce that the area of the hot springs will be closed.

== Uranium mine ==
The Miracle Hot Springs uranium mine, also known as the Miracle Mine, is located one mile west of Miracle Hot Springs. In 1954 uranium deposits were found by the prospector Henry Brooks Mann and his associates. The highest radiation counts detected were 6,000 counts per second (background rate: 160 counts per second.) Robert Martin of Miracle Hot Springs owned the Last Chance prospect, one mile east of Miracle Hot Springs. It primarily contained tungsten, and also held low-grade radioactive minerals ten times above background counts. Geologists believe the uranium in the area to be "related to the thermal springs of the area", but D.E. White in 1956 stated that "hot-spring water generally contains less uranium than many other types of water." A 1960 publication of the Atomic Energy Commission states that most of the springs in the area are not radioactive.

== Water profile ==
The hot springs water emerges from the ground at 119 °F / 48 °C at a rate of 150 gallons per minute.

== See also ==
- List of hot springs in the United States
- Remington Hot Springs
- Delonegha Hot Springs
- Kern Canyon Fault
