= Democrat Hot Springs =

Geothermal site in California

- Democrat Spring
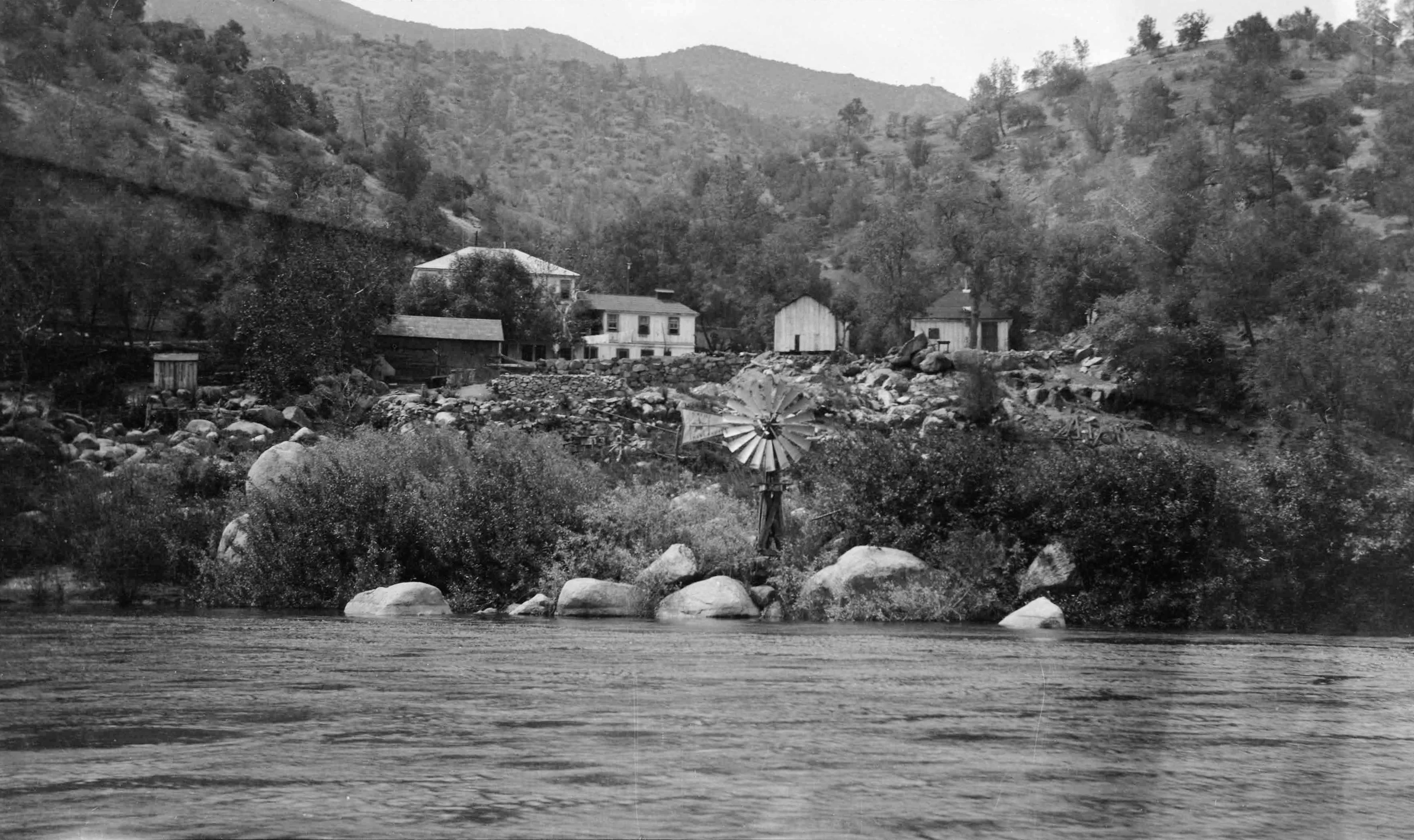
- "Kern River No. 1 – View of Democrat Hot Springs" c. 1912 (G. Haven Bishop, SoCal Ed collection, Huntington Library)
- Interactive map of Democrat Hot Springs
- Coordinates: 35.5068°N 118.679°W
- Elevation: 964 m (3,163 ft)
- Type: Thermal
- Discharge: 95 L/min (25 US gal/min)
- Temperature: 46 °C (115 °F)

Democrat Hot Springs, named for the Democratic political party, is a geothermally heated spring located 17 miles (27 km) northeast of Bakersfield, California, United States, on the south bank of the Kern River and on the north side of California State Route 178.

== History ==
The Democrat Hot Springs were named for the Democratic Party of the United States when they were developed beginning in 1903 by Delbert Hill. Hill and his father constructed a 15-room hotel surrounding by cottages for 100 additional guests. In the early days access was by the "Breckenridge Road to Rock Springs Station after an overnight stop continued down the Cow Flat Road"; this route was known as the Nightmare Trail. Later a four-horse stage coach picked people up in Bakersfield and reduced the travel time to the resort to a "mere five hours". The property has had many owners since the Hills sold out. A three-story clapboard hotel stood at Democrat Hot Springs in 1930. Charles W. West was the owner in 1967.

As of 2018, Democrat Hot Springs are still located on private property. They can be rented for private events.

== Ecology ==
Democrat Hot Springs is part of the habitat range for the rare and endangered Kern Canyon slender salamander. The Kern River near Democrat Hot Springs is a good spot for fishing rainbow trout.

== Water profile ==
The main group of springs is located about 100 yd (91 m) from the river. According to a U.S. government geologist in 1915, "At Democrat Springs, which are 5 miles below Delonegha Springs, hot water issues on the southwest side of Kern River, within 150 feet of its edge, but 50 or 75 feet above its surface. In 1908 there was a substantial hotel, having accommodations for 100 people...The waters of these springs are sulphureted, but they do not seem to carry notable amounts of other mineral matter...With reference to the fault origin of these springs, it was learned that although the earthquake of April 18, 1906, was not severely felt here, the main spring ceased flowing at that time. It was reopened a few months later by making a cut into the slope about 8 feet below the former point of issuance of the spring". The spring waters do contain "iron, sodium and other salts".

According to Kern River Country (1979), the resort had five springs. One that produced 115 °F (46 °C) at 20 US gallons per minute (0.0013 m^{3}/s) was used for bathing while the other four were piped to a reservoir near the hotel that was used as a swimming pool. According to an earlier source, "At a third place another small spring forms a drinking pool."

== See also ==
- List of hot springs in the United States § California
- Kern Canyon Fault
