= Scovern Hot Springs =

- Agua Caliente; Neills Hot Springs; Hot Springs House
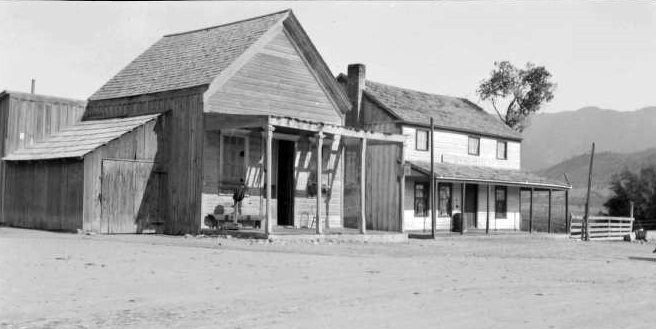
- Neills Hot Springs Hotel in 1911
- Interactive map of Scovern Hot Springs
- Location: Hot Springs Valley, Kern County, California
- Elevation: 2,490 ft (760 m)
- Type: geothermal
- Discharge: 140-to-149 gallons per minute
- Temperature: 113 °F (45 °C)

Scovern Hot Springs
- Former settlement
- Location in California
- Coordinates: 35°37′17″N 118°28′27″W
- Country: United States
- State: California
- County: Kern
- Elevation: 2,490 ft (759 m)

Scovern Hot Springs (also known as Agua Caliente, Neills Hot Springs and Hot Springs House) is a thermal spring system, and former settlement in the Kern River Valley of the Southern Sierra Nevada, in Kern County, California, United States.

== History ==
The thermal springs in the area have been used historically by Native Americans and later by Spanish settlers for their balneotheraputic qualities.

The Hot Springs Valley in Kern County was inhabited by the Palagewan people who lived along the Kern River's north fork. Other indigenous groups using the area were the Foothill Yokuts, Pahkanapil, Kawaiisu and Tübatulabal people.

A Tübatulabal village was located at the site of Scovern Hot Springs. The Tübatulabal, a Uto-Aztecan-speaking people, are considered to have been the "first stewards of the region." Their complex societal structure and innovative trade network was based on seasonal patterns in relation to the land. The Tübatulabal engaged in limited agriculture by harvesting local crops and herding animals in a semi-nomadic fashion. They maintained semi-permanent dwellings with rock foundations within their villages located throughout the valley.

When the Spanish first arrived in the area in the late 1700s, they came in contact with the Tübatulabal and Kawaiisu in the region. During the early 1800s these indigenous people had limited trade-related transactions with the Euro-Americans. These cultural dynamics shifted when gold was discovered in 1848 at Sutter's Mill which brought thousands of miners to inland California including many to the Kern River and Lake Isabella valleys. According to the Audubon California Kern River Preserve, the Tübatulabal first made contact with Francisco Garcés in 1776, and later with John C. Frémont in 1834, and with the Walker expedition in 1843.

The Scovern Hot Springs are located in the South Fork Kern River region. For a time, the springs were known as Agua Caliente, and as Neills Hot Springs.

== Former settlement ==
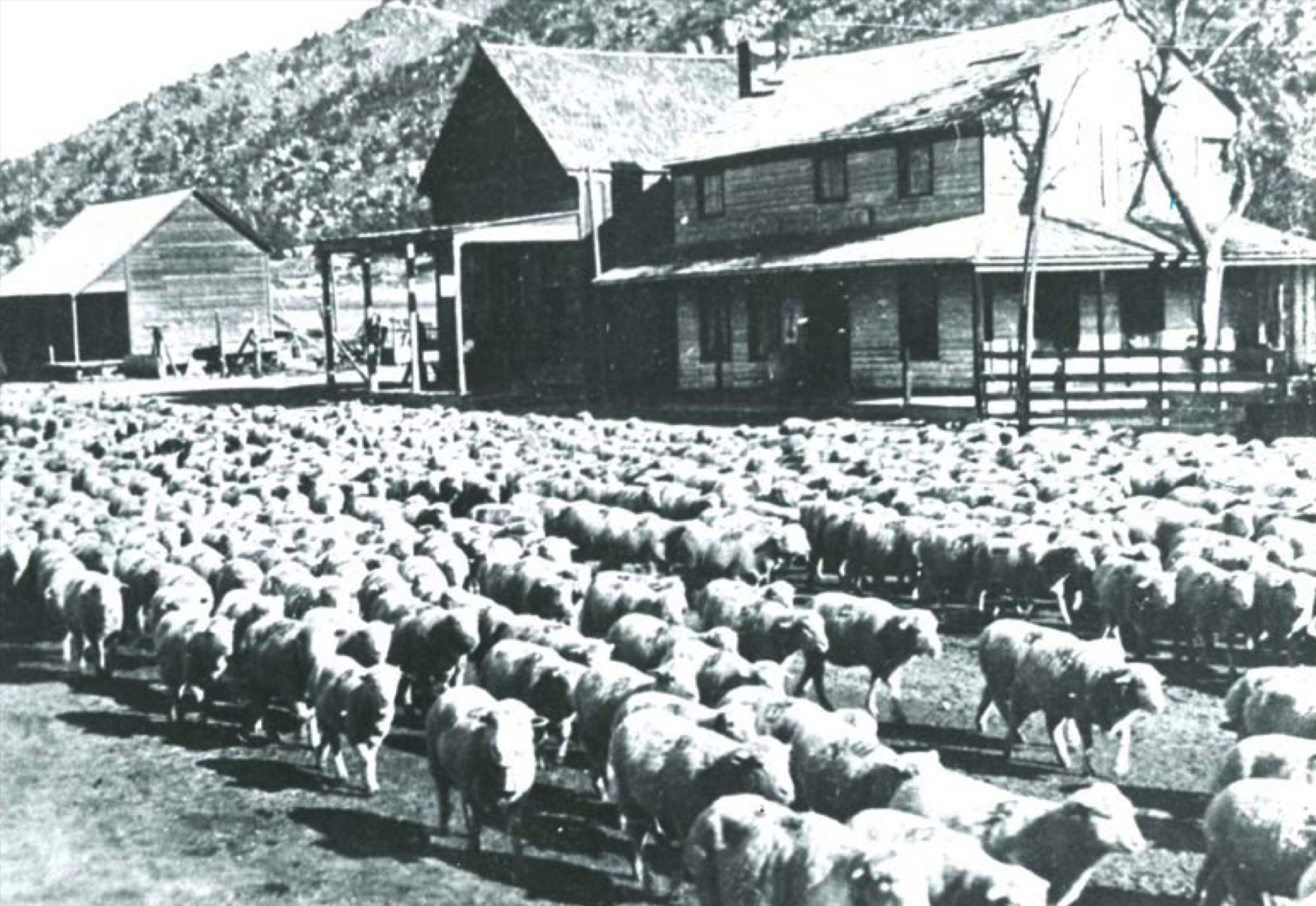
Sheep drive in front of Hot Springs House at Scovern Hot Springs, c. 1900

The California Department of Conservation states that Scovern hot springs as well as several other hot springs along the Kern River have "historically been developed for resort/spa use."

The former settlement of Scovern Hot Springs was located at the site of a geothermal spring system in the central area of Hot Springs Valley. In the 1800s it was a stop for horse-drawn stage coaches on the road between the town of Old Kernville and the railroad stop at Caliente. Ruins of the settlement that burned in 1971 could be seen until the mid-1990s when the remaining structure collapsed.

In 1866, the hot springs became known to local settlers when the "Hot Springs House", a hotel and bathhouse, was built on the site to accommodate miners. Visalia W. Delta wrote in 1866 that the thermal waters were presented as curative of "peculiar inducements to invalids, especially those suffering from chronic diseases." She goes on to write that the owners at the time guaranteed the spring water was a "speedy cure of the most obdurate cases." During this time, the owners planned to develop the facilities for "families wishing to sojourn here" to offer them accommodations to stay for weeks at a time. The cost of room and board was $15 per week, including the use of the mineral baths. In 1867 the "Ranch House" building was built at Scovern Hot Springs. The hot mineral spring water at the bathhouse was purported to cure various ailments. For a time the facility was operated by a subsidiary of the Kern County Hospital.

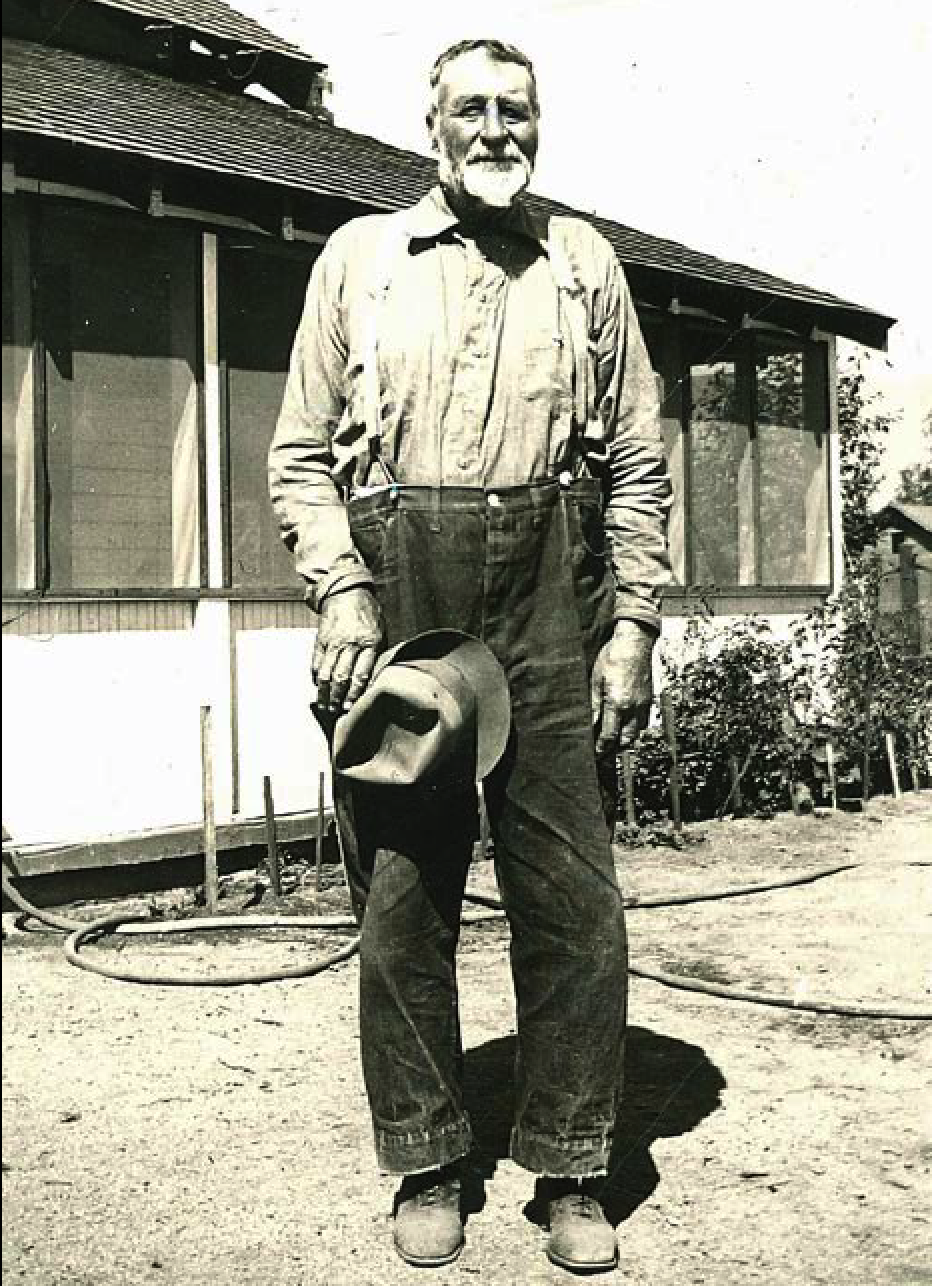
John Neill of Neills Hot Springs in the early 1900s

In 1902 John Neill purchased the "Hot Springs House", which at that time consisted of the hotel, a restaurant and a mineral spa. In 1915 the resort was completed with the addition of a swimming pool. Neill's wife Annie managed the hotel and its employees. John Neill's cousin, Robert Little, took care of the bath house. The old wooden mud-bath soaking tubs were updated with galvanized soaking tubs. Chinese cooks from the town of Kernville prepared food for guests. These upgrades brought tourists to the hot springs. Eventually, boarders rented rooms month-to-month, dined in the restaurant and participated in events such as weekend square dances.

The Neill family also bought the surrounding 840 acres which was farmed for alfalfa. The ranch raised sheep and cattle and a slaughterhouse was opened on-site. A local biographer wrote of the ranch and homestead that it had “ample barns and other out-buildings and [was] supplied with implements and appliances of every kind essential to diversified farming.”

In 1929, Louis G. Scovern and his wife Edna purchased the property, renamed it "The Scovern House". A swimming pool and additional bath houses were constructed at this time.

In 1938, the hot springs resort spa was described as a popular watering place. For a time a dude ranch was operated at Scovern Hot Springs. In the late 1930s, Mr. and Mrs. H.A. Page managed the Scovern's Hot Springs Ranch. In the 1930s and 40s the Sierra Roundup Rodeo took place at Scovern Hot Springs. The Scovern's daughter Pauline and her husband Johnny E. McNally, a ranch hand at the hot springs resort were married in 1936; McNally went on the produce the annual Sierra Rodeo Round-up held at Scovern Hot Springs. In 1941 Scovern Hot Springs was called a "leading settlement Kern's 19th century mining days" by the Bakersfield Californian newspaper.

In March, 1971 Scovern Hot Springs burned to the ground. All of the resort buildings are gone, leaving only the natural hot spring. Visitors to the areas can observe the steam rising throughout the wetland fields across from the spring system.

== Hot springs water profile ==
The hot water emerges from several spring sources in the Quaternary and Tertiary sedimentary rocks and alluvial material within the Kern Canyon geological fault zone.

The average temperature is 113 °F / 45 °C, flowing from the source at a rate of 140–to–149 gallons per minute. Spring no. 1 emerges from the ground at 132 °F / 56 °C, at a rate of flow of 330 liters per minute (87 gallons per minute). Two additional unnamed thermal wells are located near the primary Scovern hot springs. Unnamed well no. 1 is 116 °F / 47 °C, and unnamed well no. 2 is 127 °F / 53 °C. In addition to balneologic uses, the spring water was used for irrigation.

== Location ==
Scovern Hot Springs is located in the South Fork Kern River region near Isabella and 2.25 miles (3.6 km) north-northeast of Bodfish, at an elevation of 2490 feet (759 m). Scovern Hot Springs still appeared on maps as of 1943.

The springs are located in the Kern Canyon fault zone within the 225-acre Hot Springs Valley Wetlands complex. Due to the high-discharge rate of the springs, the water flows throughout the wetlands area at the daily average rate of 300,000 gallons.

== Gallery ==
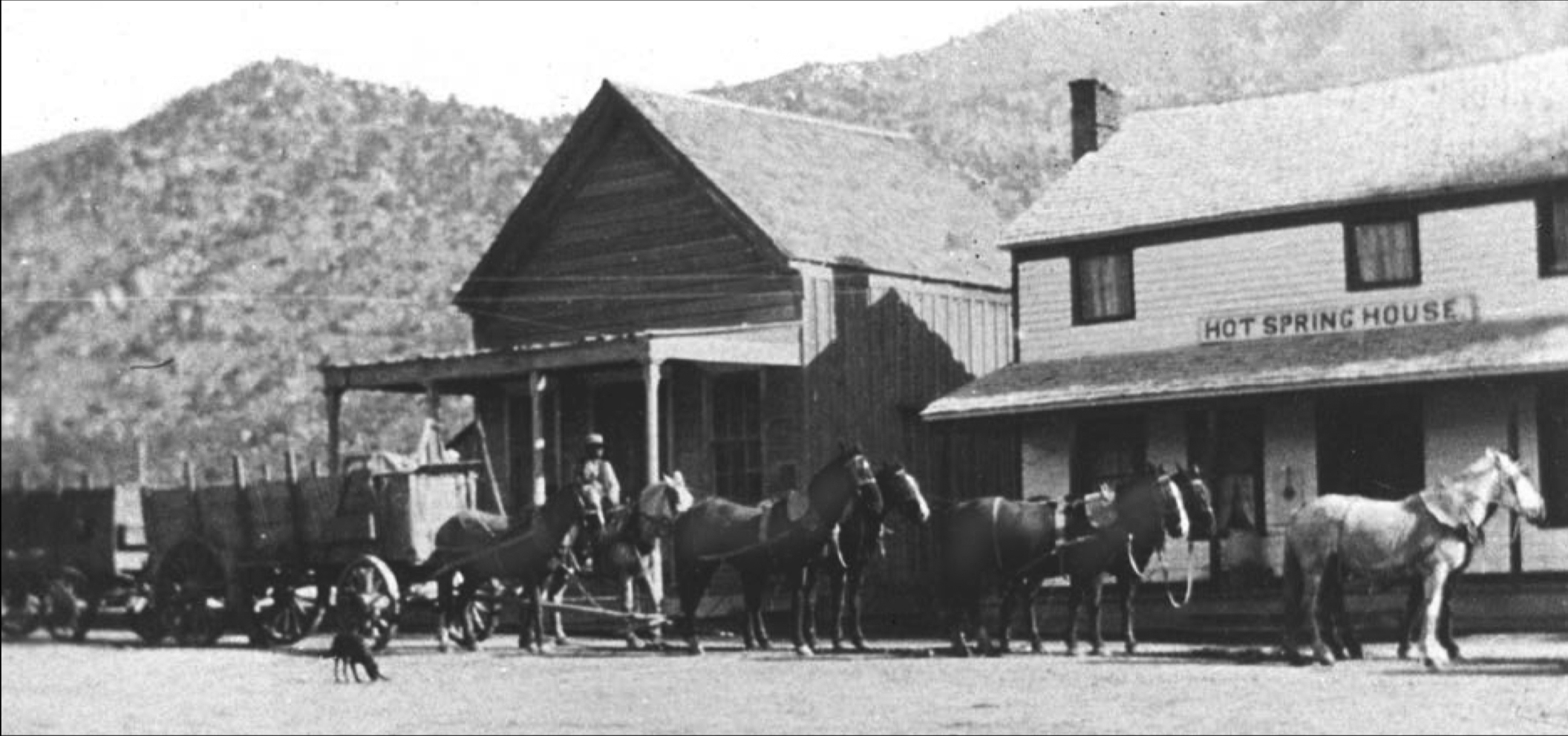
Horse-drawn mining carriages at Hot Springs House in 1900

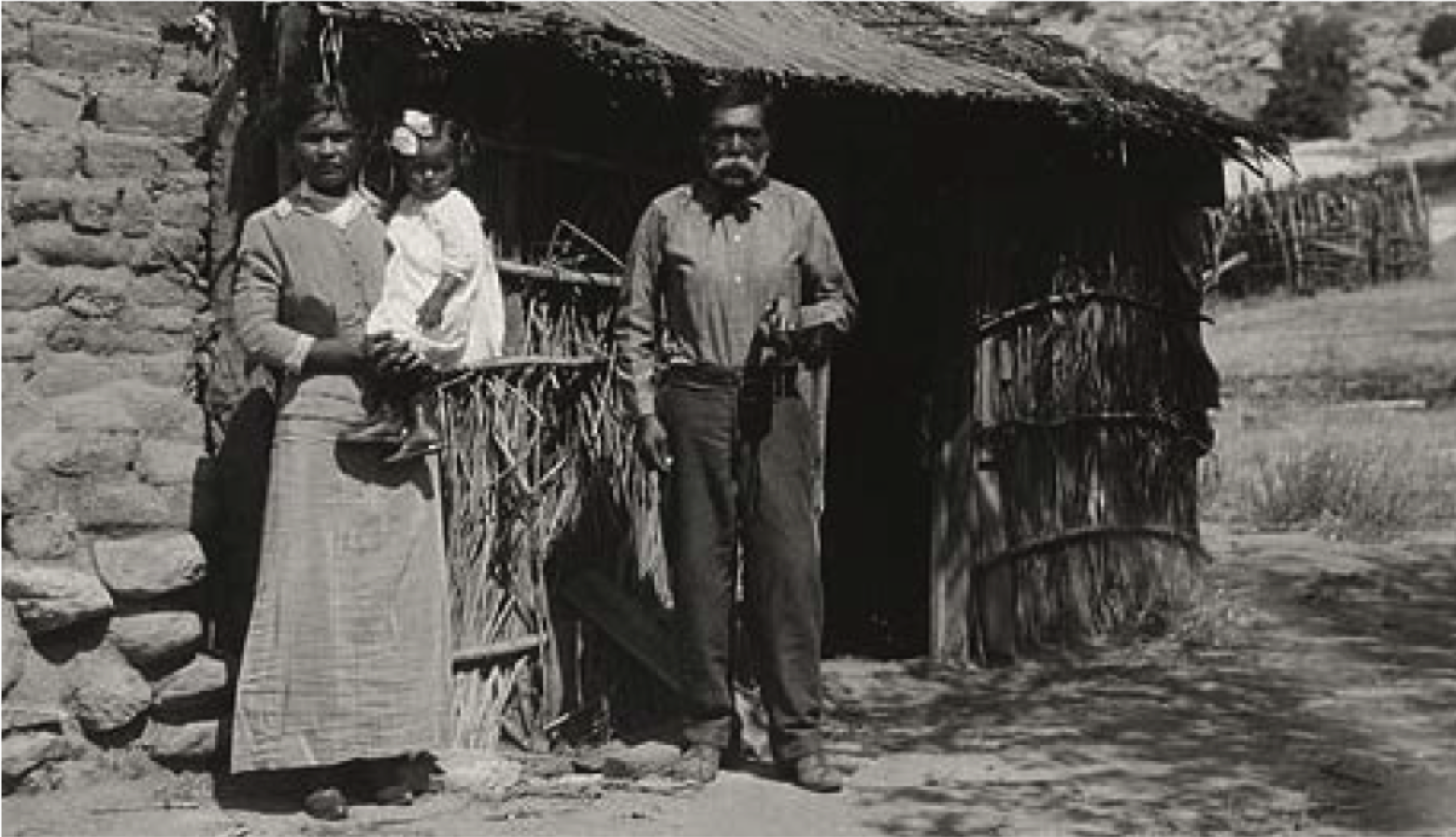
Tübatulabal family in 1916, photo: Thomas T. Waterman, U.C. Berkeley

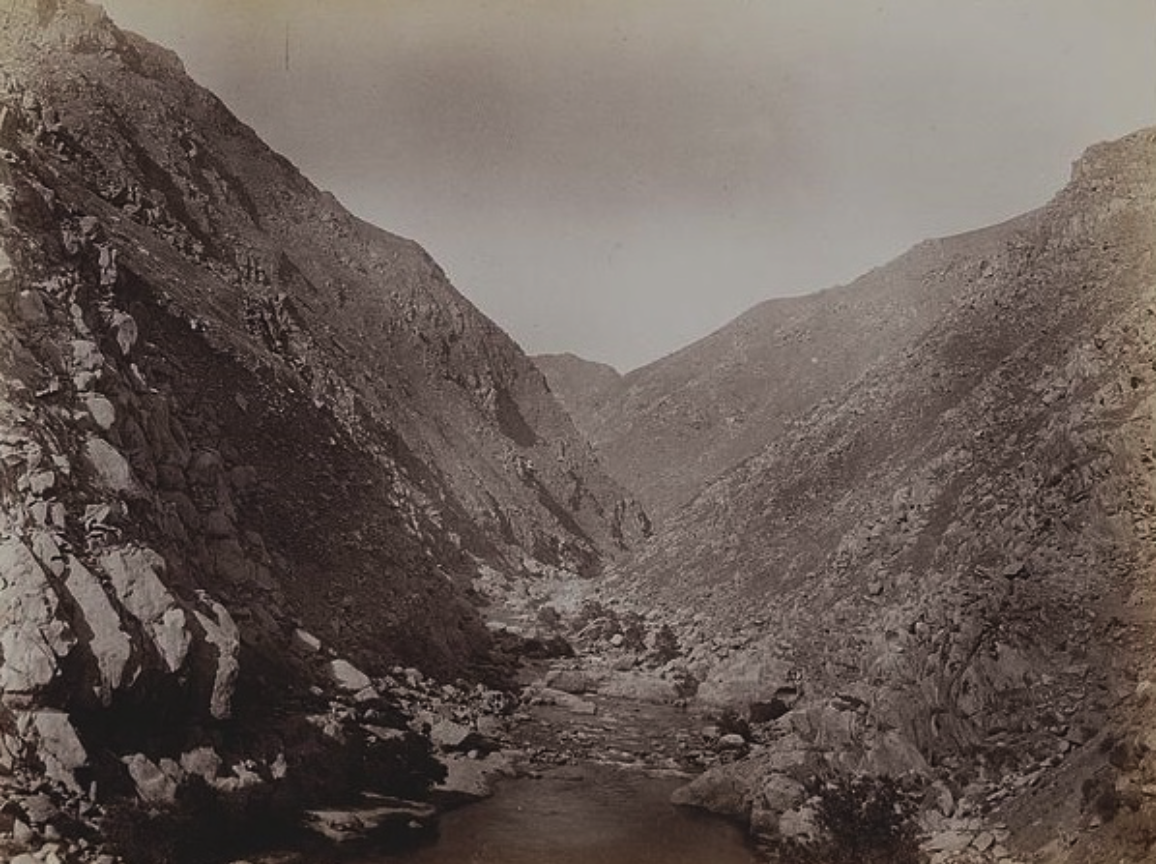
Kern River Canyon in 1888

== See also ==
- List of hot springs in the United States
- Kern Canyon Fault
