= Kern Canyon Fault =

Strike-slip fault in California, United States

Coordinates: 35.6°N 118.5°W

The Kern Canyon Fault (Late-Quaternary Active Kern Canyon Fault) is a dextral strike-slip fault (horizontal) that runs roughly around 150 km (93 mi) beside the Kern River Canyon through the mountainous area of the Southern Sierra Nevada Batholith. The fault was a reverse fault in the Early Cretaceous epoch during the primal stages of the Farallon plate subduction beneath the North American Continental Plate and fully transitioned into a strike-slip shear zone during the Late Cretaceous.

Professor Robert W. Webb of the University of Chicago was the first to research the fault in 1936; He found a lava flow (Pliocene age) that covered the northern end of the fault trace where the Little Kern and Kern River coincided. Without any evidence of deformation affecting the hardened lava and without any evidence found previously when investigating the fault line, Webb deemed the fault to be inactive.

In 2007, Professor Elisabeth Nadin (University of Alaska Fairbanks) discovered that while mapping the faults within the Southern Sierra Nevada, there had been several accounts of activity along the Kern Canyon Fault well into the Quaternary Era. Her research continued into 2010, which explicitly entailed the lines of evidence that overturn the proposition that the fault was inactive for more than 3.5 million years.

== Fault Zones ==
=== The Three Sub-Divisions ===
Due to the continued activity of the fault as well as its extension, the Kern Canyon Fault is sub-divided into three different zones; The proto-Kern Canyon Fault Zone, the Kern Canyon Fault Zone, and the late Quaternary active Kern Canyon Fault.

==== Proto-Kern Canyon Fault Zone ====
The proto-Kern Canyon Zone is an old ductile shear zone found at the northern segment of the fault line. Evidence of mylonitized zones, 90 Ma intrusive rocks, and Mesozoic-metamorphic rocks mention that this was where the Kern Canyon Fault (which shares these same rock specimens) first emerged and had drifted away from due to the constant activity within the batholith. Nadin exhumed the shear zone and recovered that it extended from the northern end of Harrison Pass, CA to the south-eastern arm of Lake Isabella, CA.

==== The Kern Canyon Fault Zone ====
The Kern Canyon Fault Zone is a north-striking feature that harbored pre-Quaternary crustal deformation such as right-lateral strike slip and east-down normal displacement. These episodes caused bedrock displacement along the fault line, allowing the fault itself to dip steeply. It extends from Walker Basin, CA to Harrison Pass and coincides with the proto-Kern Canyon Fault Zone starting from Kernville to Harrison Pass.

==== The Late-Quaternary Active "Kern Canyon Fault" ====
The late-Quaternary active Kern Canyon Fault extends the ~150 km (99) miles from Walker Basin past Harrison Pass. Its existence exploits both the Proto-Kern and Kern Canyon Fault Zones' weaknesses, resulting in ruptures along the zones over the past 15 thousand years.

== Fault Geology ==
The Kern Canyon fault, according to the early study of Webb, is made up of 90 percent of granodiorite (a phaneritic-textured intrusive igneous rock similar to granite) and although densely covered by soils and brush, Webb discovered traces of sheared breccias and mylonites in specific zones along the fault.

While conducting a study of the fault's capability of supporting Isabella Dams, Treaser (1948) recorded in-depth analysis of the fault's basement rocks. His method of understanding the geology of the fault included surface study, drilling and trenching; using this approach, he was able to discern the rocks affected by this fault zone at 800 feet in width (244m). These specimens include quartzite, olivine, gabbro, sheared granitic rocks, metasedimentary rocks, and diorite.

== See also ==
- Kern River
- Sequoia National Park
- Scovern Hot Springs
- Miracle Hot Springs
- Remington Hot Springs
- Delonegha Hot Springs
- Democrat Hot Springs
