= California's 32nd State Assembly district =

American legislative district

Current assemblymember
Stan Ellis; R–Bakersfield
- Population (2020) • Voting age • Citizen voting age: 515,015; 382,585; 333,916
- Demographics: 50.65% White; 2.62% Black; 35.15% Latino; 5.58% Asian; 0.91% Native American; 0.15% Hawaiian/Pacific Islander; 0.56% other; 4.38% remainder of multiracial
- Registered voters: 319,573
- Registration: 48.28% Republican; 24.98% Democratic; 18.03% No party preference

California's 32nd State Assembly district is one of 80 California State Assembly districts. It is currently represented by Republican Stan Ellis of Bakersfield.

== District profile ==
The district is located in the southwestern Central Valley and consists of eastern portions of Kern and Tulare Counties, including the whole Cities of Exeter, Ridgecrest, Tehachapi, Maricopa, and Taft, and portions of the Cities of Bakersfield and Visalia. The Cities of Bakersfield and Visalia were split to balance population while considering communities of interest. This district’s border is impacted by Voting Rights Act obligations in three neighboring districts. The district maintains local communities of interest along the Valley floor. Areas within the district share common social and economic characteristics as well as shared environmental concerns.

Kern County

- Bakersfield
- Bear Valley Springs
- Frazier Park
- Glenville
- Kernville
- Lake Isabella
- Maricopa
- Oildale
- Ridgecrest
- Taft
- Tehachapi

Tulare County

- Exeter
- Kaweah
- Springville
- Three Rivers
- Visalia

== Election results from statewide races ==
Year	Office	Results
2021	Recall	No 51.1 – 48.9%
2020	President	Biden 55 – 42.6%
2018	Governor	Newsom 54.3 – 45.7%
2018	Senator	de Leon 57.9 – 42.1%
2016	President	Clinton 56.5 – 38.0%
2016	Senator	Sanchez 55.9 – 44.1%
2014	Governor	Brown 54.4 – 45.6%
2012	President	Obama 56.2 – 41.8%
2012	Senator	Feinstein 57.2 – 42.8%

== List of assembly members representing the district ==
Due to redistricting, the 32nd district has been moved around different parts of the state. The current iteration resulted from the 2021 redistricting by the California Citizens Redistricting Commission.

Member	Party	Years served	Electoral history	Counties represented
Joseph Franklin (San Francisco)	Republican	January 5, 1885 – January 3, 1887	Elected in 1884. [data missing]	San Francisco
A. M. Lawrence (San Francisco)	Democratic	January 3, 1887 – March 7, 1888	Elected in 1886. Died.	San Francisco
Vacant		March 7, 1888 – January 7, 1889		San Francisco
John Staude (San Francisco)	Republican	January 7, 1889 – January 5, 1891	Elected in 1888. [data missing]	San Francisco
George E. Lewis (San Francisco)	Republican	January 5, 1891 – January 2, 1893	Elected in 1890. [data missing]	San Francisco
John E. Buckley (San Francisco)	Democratic	January 2, 1893 – January 7, 1895	Elected in 1892. [data missing]	San Francisco
John F. Twigg (San Francisco)	Democratic	January 7, 1895 – January 4, 1897	Elected in 1894. [data missing]	San Francisco
John W. Power (San Francisco)	Fusion	January 4, 1897 – January 2, 1899	Elected in 1896. [data missing]	San Francisco
James M. Hanley (San Francisco)	Democratic	January 2, 1899 – January 1, 1901	Elected in 1898. [data missing]	San Francisco
W. J. Evatt (San Francisco)	Republican	January 1, 1901 – January 5, 1903	Elected in 1900. [data missing]	San Francisco
Jay N. Copus (San Francisco)	Democratic	January 5, 1903 – January 2, 1905	Elected in 1902. [data missing]	San Francisco
Patrick J. Boyle (San Francisco)	Republican	January 2, 1905 – January 4, 1909	Elected in 1904. Re-elected in 1906. [data missing]	San Francisco
Charles A. Nelson (San Francisco)	Republican	January 4, 1909 – January 2, 1911	Elected in 1908. [data missing]	San Francisco
William P. Kennedy (San Francisco)	Republican	January 2, 1911 – January 6, 1913	Elected in 1910. [data missing]	San Francisco
Arthur L. Shannon (San Francisco)	Democratic	January 6, 1913 – January 4, 1915	Elected in 1912. [data missing]	San Francisco
Frank N. Rodgers (San Francisco)	Republican	January 4, 1915 – January 8, 1917	Elected in 1914. Retired to run for California State Senate.	San Francisco
Henry D. Byrne (San Francisco)	Republican	January 8, 1917 – January 6, 1919	Elected in 1916. Retired to run for California State Senate.	San Francisco
George W. Warren (San Francisco)	Republican	January 6, 1919 – January 8, 1923	Elected in 1918. Re-elected in 1920. [data missing]	San Francisco
Walter J. Rock (San Francisco)	Republican	January 8, 1923 – January 5, 1925	Elected in 1922. [data missing]	San Francisco
James A. Miller (San Francisco)	Republican	January 5, 1925 – January 2, 1933	Elected in 1924. Re-elected in 1926. Re-elected in 1928. Re-elected in 1930. Re-elected in 1932. Redistricted to the 22nd district.	San Francisco
Edwin H. Zion (Modesto)	Republican	January 2, 1933 – January 7, 1935	Redistricted from the 18th district and re-elected in 1932. [data missing]	Stanislaus
Hugh P. Donnelly (Turlock)	Democratic	January 7, 1935 – January 4, 1943	Elected in 1934. Re-elected in 1936. Re-elected in 1938. Re-elected in 1940. Retired to run for California State Senate.	Stanislaus
Jacob M. Leonard (San Benito)	Republican	January 4, 1943 – January 6, 1947	Redistricted from the 34th district and re-elected in 1942. Re-elected in 1944. [data missing]	San Benito, Santa Cruz
Donald L. Grunsky (Santa Cruz)	Republican	January 6, 1947 – January 5, 1953	Elected in 1946. Re-elected in 1948. Re-elected in 1950. Retired to run for California State Senate.	San Benito, Santa Cruz
Wallace Henderson (Fresno)	Democratic	January 5, 1953 – January 5, 1959	Redistricted from the 34th district and re-elected in 1952. Re-elected in 1954. Re-elected in 1956. Retired to run for Fresno City Council.	Fresno
Bert Delotto (Fresno)	Democratic	January 5, 1959 – April 15, 1962	Elected in 1958. Re-elected in 1960. Resigned after appointment to the Peace Corps.	Fresno
Vacant		April 15, 1962 – January 7, 1963		Fresno
George N. Zenovich (Fresno)	Democratic	January 7, 1963 – January 4, 1971	Elected in 1962. Re-elected in 1964. Re-elected in 1966. Re-elected in 1968. Retired to run for California State Senate.	Fresno
Kenneth L. Maddy (Fresno)	Republican	January 4, 1971 – November 30, 1974	Elected in 1970. Re-elected in 1972. Redistricted to the 30th district.	Fresno
Gordon W. Duffy (Hanford)	Republican	December 2, 1974 – November 30, 1982	Redistricted from the 21st district and re-elected in 1974. Re-elected in 1976. Re-elected in 1978. Re-elected in 1980. Retired to run for California Secretary of State.	Kern, Kings, Tulare
Bill Jones (Fresno)	Republican	December 6, 1982 – November 30, 1992	Elected in 1982. Re-elected in 1984. Re-elected in 1986. Re-elected in 1988. Re-elected in 1990. Redistricted to the 29th district.	Fresno, Madera, Mariposa, Tulare
Trice Harvey (Bakersfield)	Republican	December 7, 1992 – November 30, 1996	Elected in 1992. Re-elected in 1994. Retired to run for U.S. House of Representatives.	Kern, Tulare
Roy Ashburn (Bakersfield)	Republican	December 2, 1996 – November 30, 2002	Elected in 1996. Re-elected in 1998. Re-elected in 2000. Retired to run for California State Senate.	Kern, Tulare
Kevin McCarthy (Bakersfield)	Republican	December 2, 2002 – November 30, 2006	Elected in 2002. Re-elected in 2004. Retired to run for U.S. House of Representatives.	Kern, San Bernardino
Jean Fuller (Bakersfield)	Republican	December 4, 2006 – November 30, 2010	Elected in 2006. Re-elected in 2008. Retired to run for California State Senate.	Kern, San Bernardino
Shannon Grove (Bakersfield)	Republican	December 6, 2010 – November 30, 2012	Elected in 2010. Redistricted to the 34th district.	Kern, San Bernardino
Rudy Salas (Bakersfield)	Democratic	December 3, 2012 – November 30, 2022	Elected in 2012. Re-elected in 2014. Re-elected in 2016. Re-elected in 2018. Re-elected in 2020. Retired to run for U.S. House of Representatives.	Kern, Kings
Vince Fong (Bakersfield)	Republican	December 5, 2022 – May 24, 2024	Redistricted from the 34th district and re-elected in 2022. Resigned to run for U.S. House of Representatives.	Kern, Tulare
Vacant		May 24, 2024 – March 3, 2025	Fong was re-elected in 2024 but declined the seat.	Kern, Tulare
Stan Ellis (Bakersfield)	Republican	March 3, 2025 – present	Elected to finish Fong's term. Retiring at end of term.	Kern, Tulare

== Election results (1990-present) ==
=== 2025 (special) ===
2025 California State Assembly 32nd district special election Vacancy resulting from Vince Fong's refusal to take the seat after winning reelection
Party	Candidate	Votes	%
Republican	Stan Ellis	39,410	64.6
Democratic	Chris Cruz-Boone	17,474	28.7
Republican	Holli Willibey	2,665	4.4
Libertarian	William Brown Jr.	1,427	2.3
Total votes		60,976	100.0
Republican hold			

=== 2024 ===
2024 California State Assembly 32nd district election
Primary election
Party	Candidate	Votes	%
Republican	Vince Fong (incumbent) (withdrawn)	63,337	82.4
Republican	Ken Weir (write-in)	12,221	15.9
Democratic	David Wood (write-in)	777	1.0
Republican	Thomas Willis (write-in)	406	0.5
Republican	Ian David Smith (write-in)	139	0.2
Total votes		76,880	100.0
General election
Republican	Vince Fong (incumbent) (withdrawn)	115,091	59.1
Republican	Ken Weir	79,781	40.9
Total votes		194,872	100.0
Republican hold			

=== 2022 ===
2022 California State Assembly 32nd district election
Primary election
Party	Candidate	Votes	%
Republican	Vince Fong (incumbent)	77,776	100.0
Total votes		77,776	100.0
General election
Republican	Vince Fong (incumbent)	129,326	100.0
Total votes		129,326	100.0
Republican gain from Democratic			

=== 2020 ===
2020 California State Assembly 32nd district election
Primary election
Party	Candidate	Votes	%
Democratic	Rudy Salas (incumbent)	27,679	58.1
Republican	Todd Cotta	19,957	41.9
Total votes		47,636	100.0
General election
Democratic	Rudy Salas (incumbent)	63,450	60.0
Republican	Todd Cotta	42,328	40.0
Total votes		105,778	100.0
Democratic hold			

=== 2018 ===
2018 California State Assembly 32nd district election
Primary election
Party	Candidate	Votes	%
Democratic	Rudy Salas (incumbent)	16,690	50.4
Republican	Justin Mendes	16,438	49.6
Total votes		33,128	100.0
General election
Democratic	Rudy Salas (incumbent)	39,328	56.7
Republican	Justin Mendes	30,089	43.3
Total votes		69,417	100.0
Democratic hold			

=== 2016 ===
2016 California State Assembly 32nd district election
Primary election
Party	Candidate	Votes	%
Democratic	Rudy Salas (incumbent)	30,806	98.9
Republican	Manuel Ramirez (write-in)	334	1.1
Total votes		31,140	100.0
General election
Democratic	Rudy Salas (incumbent)	53,056	65.1
Republican	Manuel Ramirez	28,502	34.9
Total votes		81,558	100.0
Democratic hold			

=== 2014 ===
2014 California State Assembly 32nd district election
Primary election
Party	Candidate	Votes	%
Democratic	Rudy Salas (incumbent)	11,577	43.9
Republican	Pedro A. Rios	9,183	34.8
Republican	Romeo Agbalog	5,628	21.3
Total votes		26,388	100.0
General election
Democratic	Rudy Salas (incumbent)	26,721	54.8
Republican	Pedro A. Rios	22,031	45.2
Total votes		48,752	100.0
Democratic hold			

=== 2012 ===
2012 California State Assembly 32nd district election
Primary election
Party	Candidate	Votes	%
Democratic	Rudy Salas	13,053	41.4
Republican	Pedro A. Rios	7,550	23.9
Republican	Jon McQuiston	6,530	20.7
Republican	David Thomas	4,420	14.0
Total votes		31,553	100.0
General election
Democratic	Rudy Salas	38,759	52.9
Republican	Pedro A. Rios	34,476	47.1
Total votes		73,235	100.0
Democratic gain from Republican			

=== 2010 ===
2010 California State Assembly 32nd district election
Party	Candidate	Votes	%
Republican	Shannon Grove	97,470	72.1
Democratic	Holly Spohn-Gross	37,892	27.9
Total votes		135,362	100.0
Republican hold			

=== 2008 ===
2008 California State Assembly 32nd district election
Party	Candidate	Votes	%
Republican	Jean Fuller (incumbent)	120,628	69.2
Democratic	Virginia Martinez	53,789	30.8
Total votes		174,417	100.0
Republican hold			

=== 2006 ===
2006 California State Assembly 32nd district election
Party	Candidate	Votes	%
Republican	Jean Fuller	85,055	71.7
Democratic	Maribel Vega	33,594	28.3
Total votes		118,649	100.0
Republican hold			

=== 2004 ===
2004 California State Assembly 32nd district election
Party	Candidate	Votes	%
Republican	Kevin McCarthy (incumbent)	129,510	78.7
Democratic	Marvin Armas	35,130	21.4
Total votes		164,640	100.0
Republican hold			

=== 2002 ===
2002 California State Assembly 32nd district election
Party	Candidate	Votes	%
Republican	Kevin McCarthy	78,229	75.9
Democratic	Michael A. Shea, III	24,912	24.1
Total votes		103,141	100.0
Republican hold			

=== 2000 ===
2000 California State Assembly 32nd district election
Party	Candidate	Votes	%
Republican	Roy Ashburn (incumbent)	96,178	70.3
Democratic	Virginia R. Gurrola	36,527	26.7
Libertarian	Vernon Ric Pinkerton	4,107	3.0
Total votes		136,812	100.0
Republican hold			

=== 1998 ===
1998 California State Assembly 32nd district election
Party	Candidate	Votes	%
Republican	Roy Ashburn (incumbent)	73,285	70.9
Democratic	Robert "Bob" Tucker	30,029	29.1
Total votes		103,314	100.0
Republican hold			

=== 1996 ===
1996 California State Assembly 32nd district election
Party	Candidate	Votes	%
Republican	Roy Ashburn	86,790	67.0
Democratic	John F. Hulpke	38,191	29.5
Libertarian	Steve Zinn	4,498	3.5
Total votes		129,479	100.0
Republican hold			

=== 1994 ===
1994 California State Assembly 32nd district election
Party	Candidate	Votes	%
Republican	Trice Harvey (incumbent)	78,551	70.5
Democratic	Jack Keally	32,812	29.5
Total votes		111,363	100.0
Republican hold			

=== 1992 ===
1992 California State Assembly 32nd district election
Party	Candidate	Votes	%
Republican	Trice Harvey (incumbent)	87,909	65.5
Democratic	Irma Carson	42,515	31.7
Libertarian	Jeffrey Ivan Laing	3,709	2.8
Total votes		134,133	100.0
Republican hold			

=== 1990 ===
1990 California State Assembly 32nd district election
Party	Candidate	Votes	%
Republican	Bill Jones (incumbent)	71,592	68.8
Democratic	Bernie McGoldrick	32,457	31.2
Total votes		104,049	100.0
Republican hold			

== See also ==
- California State Assembly
- California State Assembly districts
- Districts in California
