= Stan Ellis =

American politician

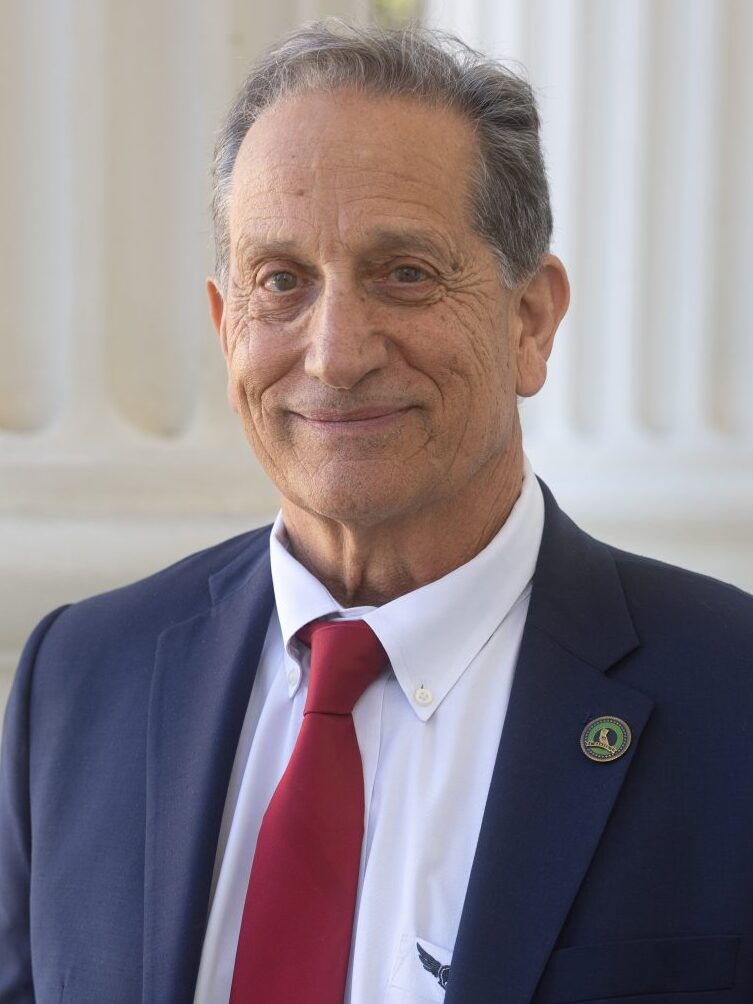
- Official portrait, 2025

Member of the California State Assembly from the 32nd district
- Incumbent
- Assumed office March 3, 2025
- Preceded by: Vince Fong
- Succeeded by: David Couch (elect)

Personal details
- Born: Stanley William Ellis; July 4, 1952 (age 74) South Dakota, U.S.
- Party: Republican
- Education: South Dakota School of Mines and Technology (BS)
- Website: Legislative website

Stanley William Ellis (born July 4, 1952) is an American businessman and politician serving as a member of the California State Assembly for the 32nd district since 2025. A Republican, he won a special election to succeed Vince Fong.

== Early life and education ==
Ellis grew up on a hog farm in South Dakota and graduated from the South Dakota School of Mines and Technology with a degree in mathematics.

== Career ==
After college, Ellis moved to Kern County, starting several small businesses in the oil and agricultural industries. He also worked in quantum physics, founding his own lab and co-founding Qubitekk, Inc., which was acquired by IonQ in January 2025.

Ellis previously owned the Bakersfield Jam franchise.

=== 2024 congressional campaign ===
Ellis ran for the U.S. House of Representatives in 2024 in California's 20th congressional district. He was eliminated in the blanket primary placing 6th with 2.1% of the vote.

== California State Assembly ==
Ellis ran for the California State Assembly in the 32nd district in the 2025 special election to succeed incumbent Vince Fong, who resigned after being elected to the U.S. House of Representatives in 2024. He had previously ran in the district in 2006, losing in the primary to Bakersfield Superintendent of Schools Jean Fuller. He garnered support from Fong, Congressman David Valadao, and other high profile Republican elected officials in the Central Valley region. Ellis won outright and declared victory the next day.

Ellis was sworn in on March 3, 2025.

On September 26, 2025, Ellis announced that he would not seek re-election in 2026, instead choosing to return his focus to business.

In an interview, Ellis expressed dissatisfaction with how the state Assembly runs. He stated, "The first several months of the year, you show up on the floor at 9 o'clock, and they don't gavel down until 10, 10:30 because nobody shows up. Then they do resolutions on Butterfly Day and Rice Day and LGBTQ. Then later in the year, we start getting some bills, and 90% of them are bills we don't need."

== Electoral history ==
=== 2025 ===
2025 California State Assembly 32nd district special election Vacancy resulting from Vince Fong's refusal to take the seat after winning reelection
Primary election
Party	Candidate	Votes	%
Republican	Stan Ellis	39,410	64.6
Democratic	Chris Cruz-Boone	17,474	28.7
Republican	Holli Willibey	2,665	4.4
Libertarian	William Brown Jr.	1,427	2.3
Total votes		60,976	100.0
Republican hold			

=== 2024 ===
2024 California's 20th congressional district blanket primary
Primary election
Party	Candidate	Votes	%
Republican	Vince Fong (incumbent)	66,160	41.9
Republican	Mike Boudreaux	37,883	24.0
Democratic	Marisa Wood	33,509	21.2
Republican	Kyle Kirkland	6,429	4.1
Democratic	Andy Morales	4,381	2.8
Republican	Stan Ellis	3,252	2.1
Republican	David Giglio (withdrawn)	2,224	1.4
No party preference	Ben Dewell	1,509	1.0
Republican	Matt Stoll	1,131	0.7
Republican	Kelly Kulikoff	724	0.5
No party preference	TJ Esposito (withdrawn)	541	0.3
No party preference	James Cardoza (write-in)	9	0.0
Total votes		157,752	100.0

=== 2006 ===
2006 California State Assembly 32nd district Republican primary
Party	Candidate	Votes	%
Republican	Jean Fuller	22,364	41.9
Republican	Stan Ellis	19,196	35.9
Republican	Phil Wyman	11,900	22.2
Total votes		53,460	100.0
