= Gordon W. Duffy =

American politician (1924–2021)

Gordon Duffy
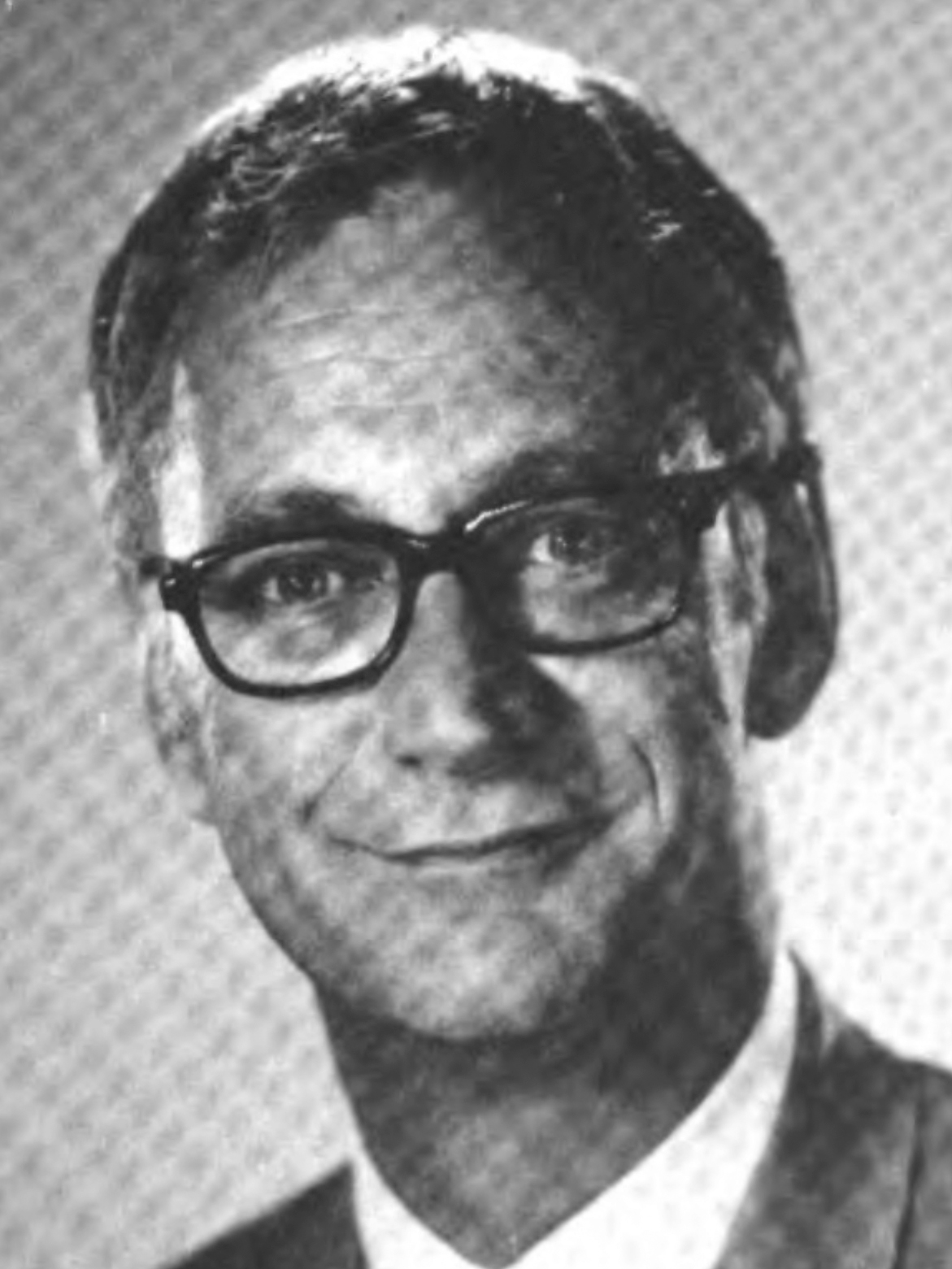
- Official portrait, 1975

Member of the California State Assembly
- In office January 4, 1965 – November 30, 1982
- Preceded by: Myron H. Frew
- Succeeded by: Bill Jones
- Constituency: 35th district (1965–1967); 21st district (1967–1974); 32nd district (1974–1982)

Personal details
- Born: April 24, 1924 Hanford, California, U.S.
- Died: February 2, 2021 (aged 96) Santa Rosa, California, U.S.
- Party: Republican
- Education: University of California, Berkeley (BS, OD)

Military service
- Branch/service: United States Navy
- Years of service: 1944–1946

Gordon West Duffy (April 24, 1924 – February 2, 2021) was an American politician and optometrist who served as a member of the California State Assembly from 1965 to 1982.

== Early life and education ==
Duffy was born in Hanford, California in 1924. His father was an optometrist. Duffy graduated from Hanford High School in 1942 and then began studies at the University of California, Berkeley. He finished his bachelor's degree in 1944. He then became an Ensign in the United States Navy, serving in the Pacific War. He left the Navy in 1946, and studied optometry at the University of California, Berkeley until 1948.

== Career ==
After returning to Hanford, he worked as an optometrist and became involved in local government. He served as a member of the planning commission, on the school board, as a member of the city council and then as mayor of Hanford. He was elected to the California State Assembly in 1964 and served as an Assemblyman until 1982. He was elected as a Republican. While in office, he was one of the principal authors of California's Emergency Services Act. In 1982, he was an unsuccessful candidate for Secretary of State of California. He then served in the California Cabinet as Secretary of Environmental Affairs and as Chairman of the California Air Resources Board. He later spent 10 years as a consultant on government affairs to various businesses.

Duffy died on February 2, 2021, at the age of 96.
