= Vince Fong =

American politician (born 1979)

- 方文思
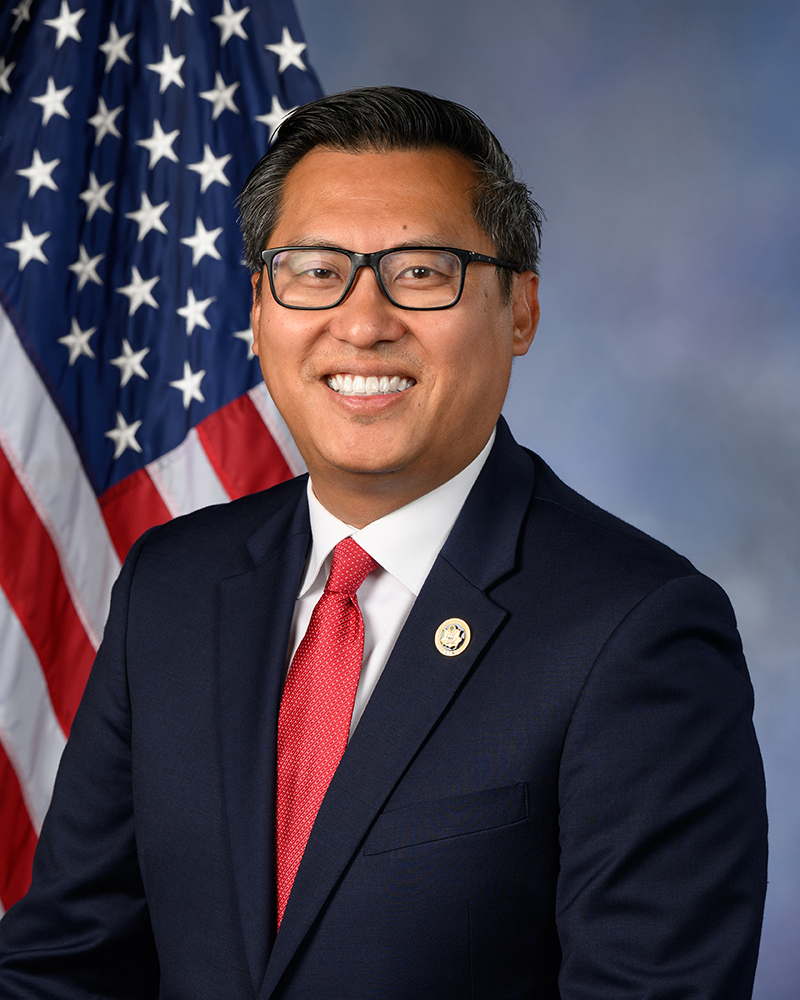
- Official portrait, 2024

Member of the U.S. House of Representatives from California's 20th district
- Incumbent
- Assumed office May 21, 2024 (Note: Fong's official service begins on the date of the special election, while he was not sworn in until June 3, 2024.)
- Preceded by: Kevin McCarthy

Member of the California State Assembly
- In office December 5, 2016 – May 24, 2024
- Preceded by: Shannon Grove (redistricted)
- Succeeded by: Stan Ellis
- Constituency: 34th district (2016–2022); 32nd district (2022–2024)

Personal details
- Born: Vincent Karchi Fong; October 24, 1979 (age 47) Bakersfield, California, U.S.
- Party: Republican
- Spouse: Amanda Boschma (m. 2023)
- Children: 1
- Education: University of California, Los Angeles (BA); Princeton University (MPA)
- Website: House website Campaign website

Chinese name
- Traditional Chinese: 方文思
- Simplified Chinese: 方文思
- Hanyu Pinyin: Fāng Wénsī
Transcriptions
Standard Mandarin
- Hanyu Pinyin: Fāng Wénsī
Yue: Cantonese
- Yale Romanization: Fōng Màhnsī
- Jyutping: Fong1 Man4 si1

Vincent Karchi Fong (Chinese: 方文思; born October 24, 1979) is an American politician who has served as the U.S. representative for California's 20th congressional district since 2024. A member of the Republican Party, he previously represented California's 32nd State Assembly district, encompassing parts of the Central Valley. Before his election to the Assembly in 2016, Fong served as district director to then-Minority Leader and Congressman Kevin McCarthy.

== Early life and education ==
Fong was born on October 24, 1979, in Bakersfield, California, to Chinese immigrant parents. Fong's father was an immigrant from Hong Kong and worked in a Bakersfield pharmacy. As a child, Vince Fong struggled with a stutter and described himself as "probably scared to death to speak in front of a group of people, let alone a class." He credited his teachers and mentors with helping him recognize his potential and overcome his fear of public speaking. He attended West High School and earned an undergraduate degree in political science from the University of California, Los Angeles. This surprised Fong's family, as Fong had not previously expressed interest in politics until college. He later obtained a master's degree in public affairs from Princeton University.

== Early political career ==
Fong began his career as an aide to Congressman Bill Thomas, the then-chair of the U.S. House Ways and Means Committee. In this role, Fong focused on international trade policy, working to expand market access for U.S. farmers and small businesses, and it was here that Fong met Thomas's then-district director, Kevin McCarthy. Fong then returned to Kern County to serve local residents, working nearly a decade as McCarthy's district director after being elected to Congress. He was actively involved in Kern County's community organizations and nonprofits, serving on the boards of Goodwill Industries of South Central California, the Jim Burke Education Foundation, and Honor Flight Kern County, supporting efforts to send WWII, Korean War, and Vietnam veterans to Washington, D.C., to visit their memorials. Additionally, he has held an elected position on the Kern County Republican Central Committee and is a lifetime member of the National Rifle Association.

== California State Assembly ==
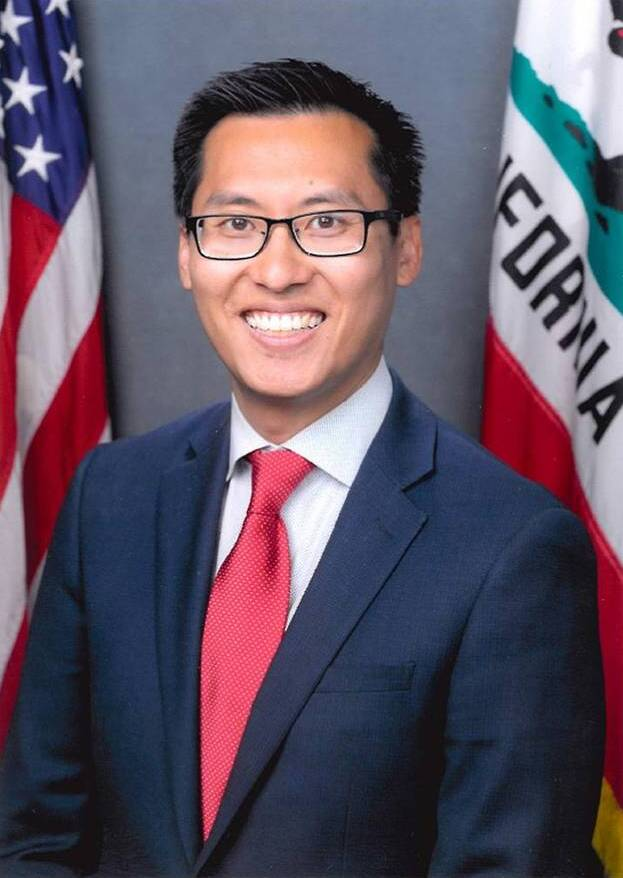
Fong during his tenure in the California State Assembly, 2016

In September 2016, Fong announced his candidacy for the California State Assembly to succeed Assemblymember Shannon Grove in the 34th district, who was term-limited. In the general election, Fong faced Perrin Swanlund, an 18-year-old who recently graduated from West High School, and won the election by a wide margin. Fong was the first Asian American ever to represent Bakersfield in the state legislature, a notable achievement considering the Central Valley's long history of conservative Asian-American political involvement. He was re-elected in 2018, 2020, and 2022, with Fong being redistricted to the 32nd district in 2022. While serving in the Assembly, Fong authored several notable bills, including one aimed at reducing catalytic converter theft, another promoting wildfire prevention through controlled grazing, and a measure to provide firearm training materials in multiple languages. His legislative work has largely focused on enhancing public safety and fostering economic growth.

He resigned his Assembly seat on May 24, 2024, after winning the special U.S. House of Representatives election. Fong appeared on both the U.S. House and Assembly ballots in the general election. For his Assembly seat, he endorsed Bakersfield City Councilor Ken Weir, who had secured a second-place spot in the primary via a write-in campaign, encouraging voters to select Weir over himself. Nevertheless, in the general election, Fong won over Weir.

== U.S. House of Representatives ==
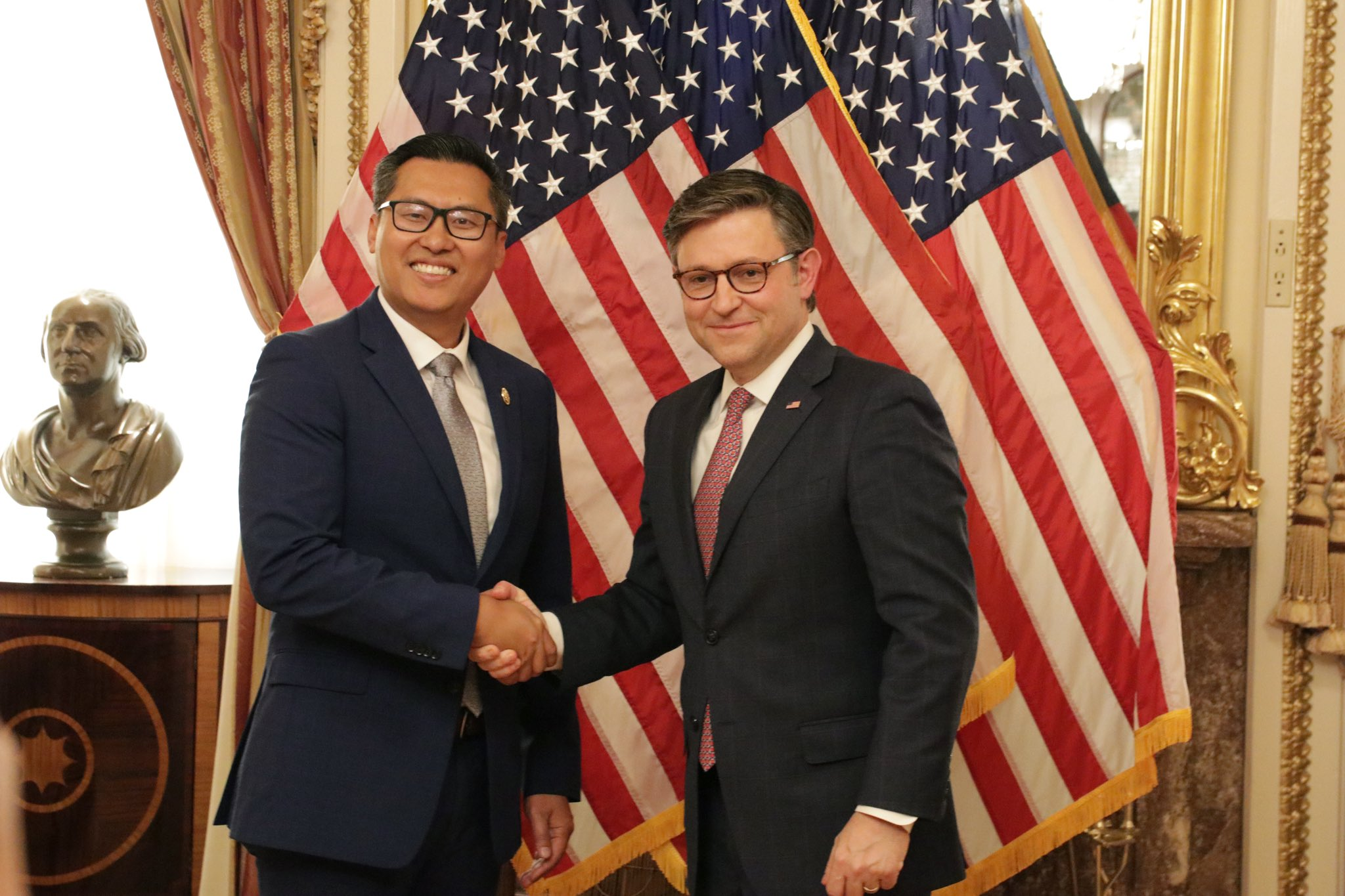
Fong shaking hands with Speaker Mike Johnson after being sworn in

=== Elections ===
==== 2024 ====
On December 6, 2023, U.S. Representative Kevin McCarthy, having been removed as Speaker of the House, announced his resignation from Congress effective December 31. A special election was scheduled for March 19, 2024, with a runoff on May 21, 2024. Initially declining to run, Fong later announced his candidacy for the seat, despite already filing for re-election in the Assembly. California Secretary of State Shirley Weber deemed Fong ineligible to run in the congressional election due to his existing qualification for re-election, as state law prohibits candidates from running for two offices simultaneously. Fong sued the state, and Superior Court Judge Shelleyanne W. L. Chang ruled in his favor, permitting him to run. Weber appealed the decision, and Assemblymember Wendy Carrillo introduced a bill prohibiting dual candidacies. In January 2024, Weber petitioned a state appeals court to overturn the ruling, while Assemblywoman Gail Pellerin introduced a similar bill to prevent candidates from filing for multiple offices in the same election.

Fong advanced to the runoff in the special election against Tulare County Sheriff Mike Boudreaux, another Republican, and ultimately won with a 60%-39% margin. He was sworn in as a member of the U.S. House of Representatives by Speaker Mike Johnson on June 3, 2024. In the general election, Boudreaux withdrew and endorsed Fong, who went on to win re-election to a full term in the U.S. House of Representatives.

=== Committee assignments ===
- Committee on Science, Space, and Technology
  - Subcommittee on Environment
  - Subcommittee on Investigations and Oversight
- Committee on Transportation and Infrastructure
  - Subcommittee on Aviation
  - Subcommittee on Railroads, Pipelines, and Hazardous Materials
- Committee on Homeland Security
  - Subcommittee on Cybersecurity and Infrastructure Protection

=== Caucus memberships ===
- Main Street Caucus
- Congressional Western Caucus
- Dutch Caucus (co-chair)
- Modern Agriculture Caucus

== Electoral history ==
Electoral history of Vince Fong
Year	Office		Party	Primary			General			Result	Swing	Ref.
Year	Office		Party	Total	%	P.	Total	%	P.	Result	Swing	Ref.
2016	State Assembly	34th	Republican	57,915	60.32%	1st	123,959	73.23%	1st	Won	Hold	
2018	State Assembly	34th	Republican	65,323	76.36%	1st	103,346	70.59%	1st	Won	Hold	
2020	State Assembly	34th	Republican	83,909	71.61%	1st	146,611	68.09%	1st	Won	Hold	
2022	State Assembly	32nd	Republican	77,776	100.00%	1st	129,326	100.00%	1st	Won	Gain	
2024	State Assembly	32nd	Republican	63,337	82.38%	1st	115,091	59.06%	1st	Won	Hold	
2024	U.S. House	20th	Republican	51,194	42.28%	1st	50,643	60.58%	1st	Won	Hold	
2024	U.S. House	20th	Republican	66,160	41.94%	1st	187,862	65.05%	1st	Won	Hold	

=== California State Assembly ===
State Assembly electoral history

2016 California State Assembly 34th district election
Primary election
Party	Candidate	Votes	%
Republican	Vince Fong	57,915	60.3
Democratic	Perrin Swanlund	23,429	24.4
Republican	Ernie Gollehon	8,779	9.1
Republican	Michael Garcia Biglay	5,886	6.1
Total votes		96,009	100.0
General election
Republican	Vince Fong	123,959	73.2
Democratic	Perrin Swanlund	45,305	26.8
Total votes		169,264	100.0
Republican hold			

2018 California State Assembly 34th district election
Primary election
Party	Candidate	Votes	%
Republican	Vince Fong (incumbent)	65,323	76.4
Democratic	Nick Nicita	20,221	23.6
Total votes		85,544	100.0
General election
Republican	Vince Fong (incumbent)	103,346	70.6
Democratic	Nick Nicita	43,048	29.4
Total votes		146,394	100.0
Republican hold			

2020 California State Assembly 34th district election
Primary election
Party	Candidate	Votes	%
Republican	Vince Fong (incumbent)	83,909	71.6
Democratic	Julie Solis	32,922	28.1
Democratic	Regina Velasquez (write-in)	343	0.3
Total votes		117,174	100.0
General election
Republican	Vince Fong (incumbent)	146,611	68.1
Democratic	Julie Solis	68,716	31.9
Total votes		215,327	100.0
Republican hold			

2022 California State Assembly 32nd district election
Primary election
Party	Candidate	Votes	%
Republican	Vince Fong (incumbent)	77,776	100.0
Total votes		77,776	100.0
General election
Republican	Vince Fong (incumbent)	129,326	100.0
Total votes		129,326	100.0
Republican hold			

2024 California State Assembly 32nd district election
Primary election
Party	Candidate	Votes	%
Republican	Vince Fong (incumbent) (withdrawn)	63,337	82.4
Republican	Ken Weir (write-in)	12,221	15.9
Democratic	David Wood (write-in)	777	1.0
Republican	Thomas Willis (write-in)	406	0.5
Republican	Ian David Smith (write-in)	139	0.2
Total votes		76,880	100.0
General election
Republican	Vince Fong (incumbent) (withdrawn)	115,091	59.1
Republican	Ken Weir	79,781	40.9
Total votes		194,872	100.0
Republican hold			

=== U.S. House ===
U.S. House electoral history

2024 California's 20th congressional district special election Vacancy resulting from the resignation of Kevin McCarthy
Primary election
Party	Candidate	Votes	%
Republican	Vince Fong	51,194	42.3
Republican	Mike Boudreaux	31,202	25.8
Democratic	Marisa Wood	27,337	22.6
Democratic	Kyle Kirkland	5,941	4.9
Democratic	Harmesh Kumar	2,885	2.4
No party preference	Ben Dewell	1,074	0.9
No party preference	David Fluhart	878	0.7
No party preference	James Cardoza	298	0.2
Republican	Anna Cohen	289	0.2
Total votes		121,098	100.0
General election
Republican	Vince Fong	50,643	60.6
Republican	Mike Boudreaux	32,952	39.4
Total votes		83,595	100.0
Republican hold			

2024 California's 20th congressional district election
Primary election
Party	Candidate	Votes	%
Republican	Vince Fong (incumbent)	66,160	41.9
Republican	Mike Boudreaux	37,883	24.0
Democratic	Marisa Wood	33,509	21.2
Republican	Kyle Kirkland	6,429	4.1
Democratic	Andy Morales	4,381	2.8
Republican	Stan Ellis	3,252	2.1
Republican	David Giglio (withdrawn)	2,224	1.4
No party preference	Ben Dewell	1,509	1.0
Republican	Matt Stoll	1,131	0.7
Republican	Kelly Kulikoff	724	0.5
No party preference	TJ Esposito (withdrawn)	541	0.3
No party preference	James Cardoza (write-in)	9	0.0
Total votes		157,752	100.0
General election
Republican	Vince Fong (incumbent)	187,862	65.1
Republican	Mike Boudreaux (withdrawn)	100,926	34.9
Total votes		288,788	100.0
Republican hold			

== Personal life ==
Fong is a Protestant. He is married to Amanda Boschma, whom he met at a Bakersfield area foster care non-profit.

== See also ==
- List of Asian Americans and Pacific Islands Americans in the United States Congress
- Asian American and Pacific Islands American conservatism in the United States
- Asian Americans in politics

U.S. House of Representatives
Preceded by Kevin McCarthy	Member of the U.S. House of Representatives from California's 20th congressional district 2024–present	Incumbent
U.S. order of precedence (ceremonial)
Preceded by Tim Kennedy	United States representatives by seniority 359th	Succeeded by Michael Rulli
