= Isabella Dam =

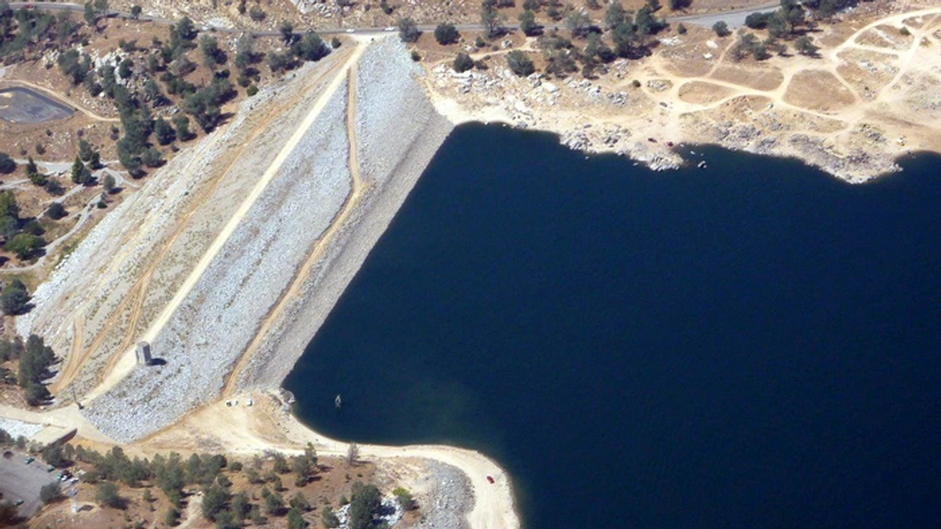
- Aerial view
- Interactive map of Isabella Dam
- Location: Kern County, California
- Coordinates: 35°38′46″N 118°28′56″W
- Construction began: 1948; 78 years ago
- Opening date: 1953; 73 years ago
- Operators: U.S. Army Corps of Engineers, Sacramento District

Dam and spillways
- Impounds: Lower Kern River
- Height: 185 ft (56 m)
- Length: 1,695 ft (517 m)
- Spillways: Ungated concrete overflow
- Spillway capacity: 49,000 cu ft/s (1,400 m^{3}/s)

Reservoir
- Creates: Lake Isabella
- Total capacity: 568,000 acre⋅ft (0.701 km^{3})
- Catchment area: 2,074 mi^{2} (5,370 km^{2})
- Surface area: 11,000 acres (4,500 ha)

Power Station
- Installed capacity: 12 MW
- Annual generation: 22,610,000 KWh (2001–2012)

Isabella Dam is an embankment dam located in the Kern River Valley, about halfway down the Kern River course, between the towns of Kernville and Lake Isabella in Kern County, California.

Isabella Dam serves agricultural, hydroelectric, and flood control uses. Lake Isabella (the reservoir created by the dam) also serves as a recreational and tourist attraction. Water sports, fishing, boating, camping, and hiking are common throughout the area, as well as the Sequoia National Forest.

== Background ==
The town of Isabella was founded by Steven Barton in 1893 and named in honor of Queen Isabella of Spain while her name was popular during the 1893 Columbian Exposition. In 1948, Congress appropriated funds to build a dam to prevent flooding of Bakersfield. The city had been flooded in 1867 and 1893. In 1950, while the dam was under construction, they experienced flooding measuring 30,000 cubic feet (850 m^{3}) of water per second. The dam was completed in March 1953. The U.S. Corps of Engineers built earthen dams across two forks of the Kern River to create the Isabella reservoir, Kern County's largest body of water year round with a surface area of 11,200 acres (4,500 ha). During the construction of the dam and reservoir the towns of Lake Isabella and Kernville both had to be moved to higher ground. Most of the original town of Kernville had been razed in 1948, in preparation for the construction of the dam.

Below Isabella Dam, the Kern River flows southwest through approximately 30 miles (48 km) of a canyon, locally known as Kern Canyon, with many steep cliffs and turns along the southern edge of the Greenhorn Mountains, roughly 15 miles (24 km) east of Bakersfield. Once it reaches Bakersfield, the river loses most of its remaining flow; much of it is diverted and channelized before reaching the city center.

Bakersfield and about 350,000 acres (140,000 ha) of farm land and oil fields in the Kern River region are protected by the project. As a partner to dams on the Kings, Kaweah and Tule Rivers, the Isabella dam helps curb flood losses to cropland in the Tulare Lake Basin as well.

== Construction and operation ==
Bakersfield sustained extensive damage by being seventeen feet below the flood crest of the 1937 flood of the San Joaquin River Basin. During 1943, some $10 million ($137 million today) worth of flood damage was done to agriculture alone in the Tulare Lake Basin; the Kern River contributed almost half of the flow that caused the damage. The Sacramento District, under the direction of the district engineer, Lt. Col. Chambers, and by the authority of the 1936 Act, conducted a study of the area in 1937. Their study, completed in 1940, disclosed that roughly $750,000 (over $12 million today) in flood control benefits would be realized with the completion of regulatory works on the Kern River. Their study also showed that an average benefit to irrigation and existing power facilities of $185,000 ($2.5 million today) could be gained as well. After the District filed its report, Congress authorized the Isabella Project in the 1944 Flood Control Act. Construction began in 1948, under contract with Rand Construction Company, and completed in 1953; the federal government spent $22 million ($305 million today) for the project.

Isabella Dam consists of two dams, a "main dam", and an "auxiliary dam". The main dam is of earthen build, 1,695 feet (517 m) long and 98 feet (30 m) tall, and owned and maintained by the U.S. Army Corps of Engineers. The main reservoir, Lake Isabella, can hold up 570,000 acre-feet (700,000,000 m^{3}) of water. Normal release from the main dam is 3,000 cubic feet per second (85 m^{3}/s), maximum historical releases were 7,200 cubic feet per second (200 m^{3}/s) in 1983.

The reservoir that Isabella Dam creates is called Lake Isabella. Water from Lake Isabella can be used in any of three ways. It is released into the Lower Kern River from the main dam, through the hydroelectric project in the main dam, or through the hydroelectric project in the auxiliary dam. The design capacity of the release channel (the Lower Kern River) is over 8,000 cubic feet per second (230 m^{3}/s). If Lake Isabella is above 110,000 acre-feet (140,000,000 m^{3}), the water can also be diverted into the Borel project at the main dam.

== Borel Hydroelectric Project ==
Hydroelectric development on the Kern River in central California began in 1894 when the Power, Transit and Light Company started construction of a small plant at the mouth of Kern Canyon. The following year, the Kern River and Los Angeles Electric Power Company obtained water rights on the river and planned construction of a power plant. This project, Borel Hydroelectric Project, was built to provide power for the growing Red Electric Streetcar (also known as Red Car) transportation system in Los Angeles.

Because construction of Isabella Dam would bisect the Borel canal, the Corps entered into an agreement with SCE such that the dam would be built in a manner to "afford operation conditions at least equal to that existing in the Borel Canal under pre-project [pre-Isabella Dam] conditions." That 1950 Contract for Relocation, Rearrangement, and Alteration of Borel Facilities requires that the Corps make available to the Borel project the full flow of the Kern River and all releases from storage in Isabella Reservoir. In addition, the Corps must operate and maintain Isabella Dam and reservoir in a manner that will not interfere with or otherwise reduce the efficiency or capacity of the operation of the Borel project.

The auxiliary dam is part of the Borel Hydroelectric Project. The canal for the Borel project diverts water from 5.5 miles (8.9 km) upstream of Isabella Dam.

The Borel project was decommissioned in 2018 and the easement through the Auxiliary Dam was sealed in February 2019.

== Lake Isabella Dam Restoration Project ==
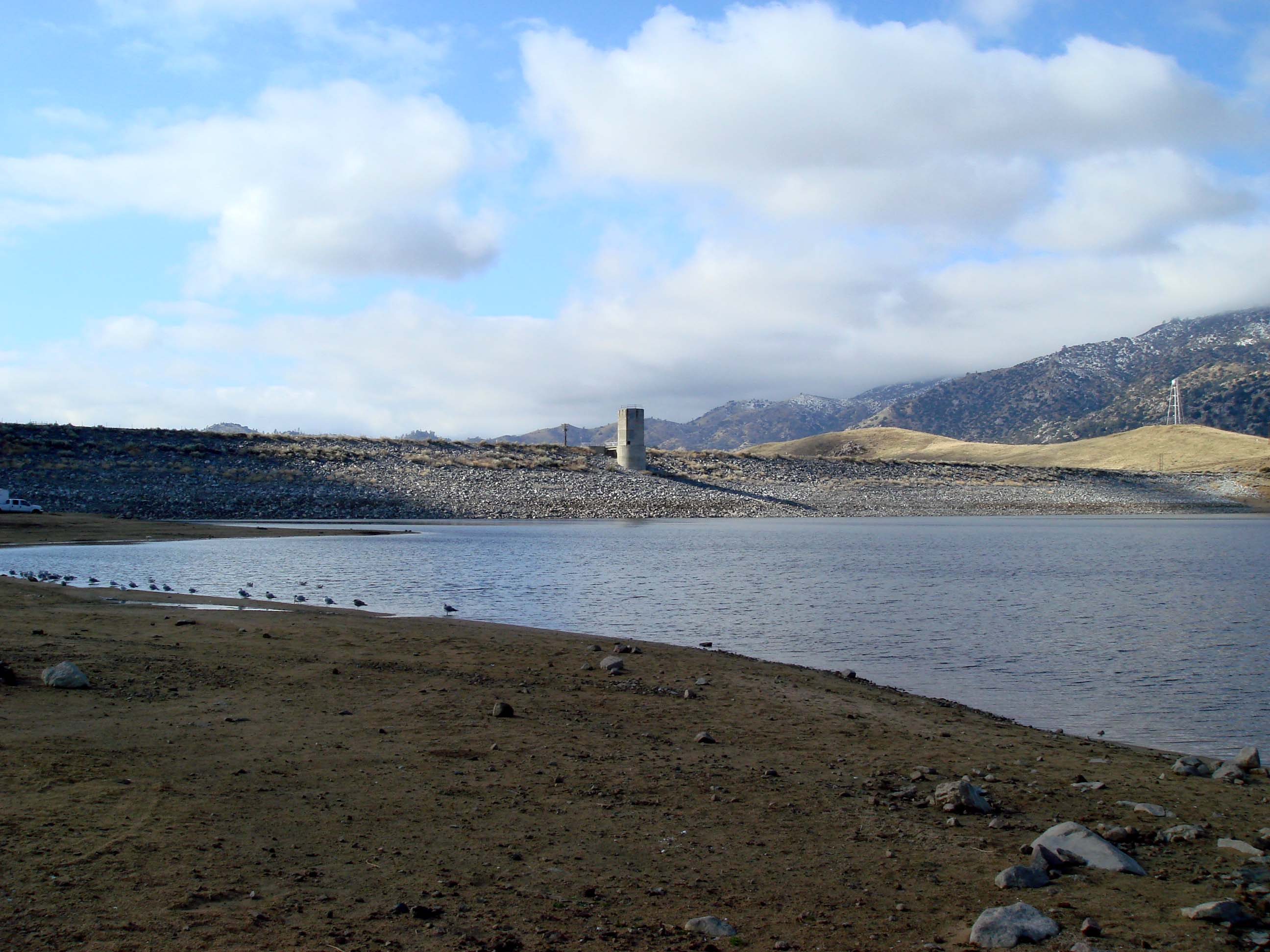
Auxiliary Isabella Dam, with Lake Isabella at its base

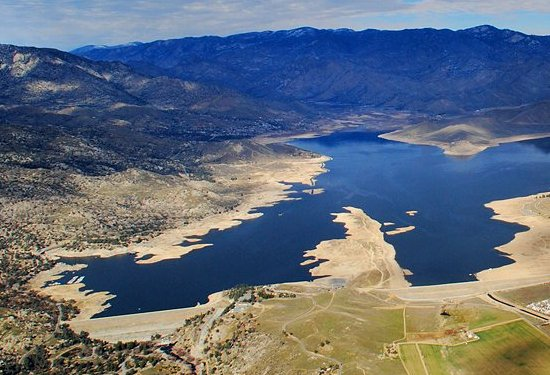
Isabella Dam, with Lake Isabella beyond

With more than 300,000 people living and working below the dams, primarily in the town of Lake Isabella and the city of Bakersfield, the U.S. Army Corps of Engineers (USACE) began a dam safety modification study (DSMS) in 2006 to address seismic, hydrologic (potential overtopping during an extreme flood event) and seepage issues at the dams. On April 28, 2006, a seepage problem was found in the Isabella Auxiliary Dam. Officials determined that it would be necessary to restrict the maximum reservoir elevation to 20 feet (6.1 m) below the spillway, or normal "full" pool. The dam's releases through the outlet were increased, allowing the water to flow at 4,500 cubic feet per second (130 m^{3}/s).

In May 2006, due to more than average rainfall and snowpack in the mountains, and warmer than average temperatures in the area, the Upper Kern River was filling Lake Isabella faster than officials could lower it. The Lower Kern River was also running higher than normal, and flowing at up to 20 miles per hour (32 km/h) in some parts. State Route 178, which travels through the canyon between Bakersfield and Lake Isabella, became unstable, and one lane was closed due to the high water levels. Some flooding was reported by property owners along the river. Emergency management officials warned that if Isabella Dam were to fail when the reservoir was full, a large part of Bakersfield would be inundated within 2 to 4 hours.

After the news of the seepage, the dam came under further attention due to being situated on a fault line. The fault line was thought to be inactive, but in February 2007, a study by the U.S. Army Corps of Engineers found evidence of at least one earthquake in the last 5,000 years, and therefore judged the fault line as active. With the new information about the fault line, the study said the dam was not likely to be in danger. On November 9, 2007, the Corps of Engineers released the Isabella Dam Consensus Report, that confirmed the high-risk classification of the dam, ranking Isabella Dam among the 6 highest risk and highest priority dams in America, and later elevated it to the highest priority.

On March 12, 2008, local officials brought in a team of emergency response experts, and began work on an evacuation plan in case Isabella Dam were to fail. The Corps released a Final Environmental Impact Statement (FEIS) on March 23, 2012, reporting their plans for the future of the dam. The plans included structural improvements in order to reduce the risk to the public and property from floods, earthquakes, and seepage. Part of the plan included raising both dams approximately 16 feet (4.9 m), a new 900 feet (270 m) emergency spillway, and moving State Route 155 and State Route 178 above the new crest line. Changes made to the original plan also reduced impacts on recreation, biological resources, and water quality. The planners consulted with the Fish and Wildlife Service to ensure negligible impacts on fish and wildlife or environmental loss. Existing downstream water would also be maintained in cooperation with power generators and irrigators, as is required in the initial relocation agreement in 1950.

In January 2014, the Corps held an "Agency Technical Review" for the first 35 percent of the project's planning. The Corps began testing the water flow of a model of the project that was built and studied at Utah State University. John Prettyman of the USACE in Sacramento said the model is approximately one-third the size of a football field. In 2013, after signing the Record of Decision in December 2012, the Corps entered the project's Pre-Construction Engineering and Design phase. Several procedural tasks must still be completed before physical construction begins, which is scheduled for 2017.

The project will not increase the current storage level or capacity of the dam. The Corps explained that would require an additional study and authorization. However, during the construction, the water level will be intentionally lowered, if need be. The Corps added that it will take measures to decrease effects to recreation. An operating restriction is currently in place, limiting the lake's normal storage capacity, to reduce the risk of the seepage and seismic concerns while a permanent solution is investigated. USACE has implemented increased surveillance and monitoring; stockpiling of emergency materials; warning sirens in the town of Lake Isabella; installation of additional instrumentation for monitoring; and continued public outreach with Kern County and the local public.

In September 2017, The Corp awarded a $204 million contract to Flatiron/Dragados/Sukut Joint Venture of Benicia to construct modifications to the Isabella Lake Dam in Lake Isabella. The contract includes addressing the identified overtopping, seismic, and seepage concerns. Construction at the main dam will include excavation of a new emergency spillway, modifications to the existing service spillway, a 16-foot (4.9 m) raise of the main dam, modifications to California State Route 155 at the main dam's right abutment, and modifications at several recreation facilities north of the auxiliary dam. Construction began in 2018 and was completed in 2022.

== Recreation ==
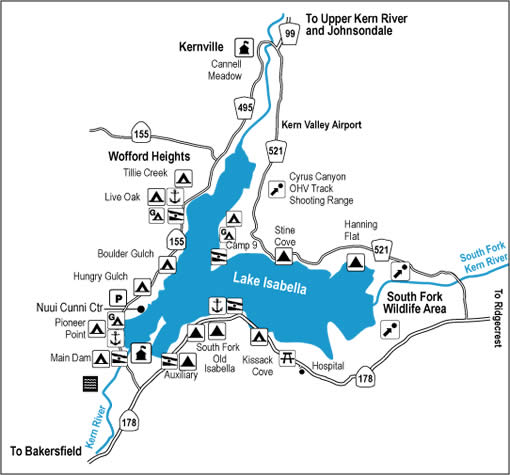
Isabella Recreation Sites

The area hosts over 30 designated campgrounds surrounding the reservoir, many within the Sequoia National Forest. The National Forest contains over 2,500 miles (4,000 km) of road and 850 miles (1,370 km) of trails, and hosts a number of camping and recreational facilities. The forest is adjacent to Sequoia and Kings Canyon National Parks.

Sport fishing is available year-round in the reservoir. The reservoir is stocked with trout, bass, bluegill, crappie, and catfish. Water sports allowed on the lake also include boating, sailing, jet skiing, water skiing, and wind surfing. Boating and fishing permits are available at any marina and at several convenience stores in the Lake Isabella area. Whitewater rafting, kayaking, and fishing are also permitted along the Kern River.

== See also ==
- List of dams and reservoirs in California
