= Tillie Creek =

River in California

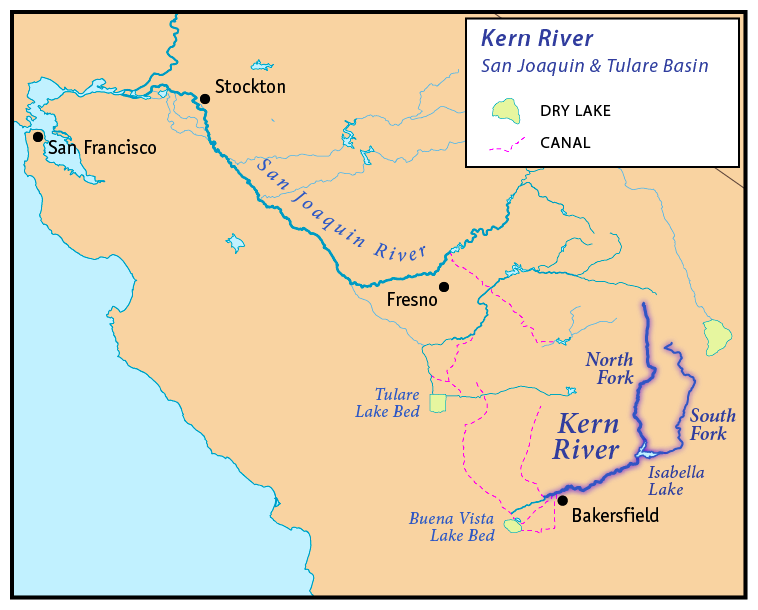
- Map of the San Joaquin and Tulare Basin region with the Kern River highlighted. Some rivers shown are intermittent or normally dry. A few selected canals are shown. Below: Map of the San Joaquin and Tulare Basin region showing the old lakes and river courses.

Location
- Country: United States
- State: California
- Region: Sierra Nevada
- District: Kern County
- City: Wofford Heights

Physical characteristics
- Source
  - location: Sequoia National Forest
- Mouth
  - location: Lake Isabella reservoir (formerly on North Fork Kern River)
  - coordinates: 35°42′22″N 118°27′39″W
  - elevation: 2,680 ft (820 m)
- Discharge
  - location: Kern River Valley

Tillie Creek is a tributary of the North Fork of the Kern River, in the Southern Sierra Nevada, Kern County, California.

Since the Kern River was dammed in the Kern River Valley, the creek's mouth is now on Lake Isabella reservoir in Wofford Heights.

In Wofford Heights the creek is located at 35°42′22″N 118°27′39″W.
