= California State Route 155 =

Highway in California

State Route 155

- Map of Kern County in south central California with SR 155 highlighted in red

Route information
- Maintained by Caltrans
- Length: 74.79 mi (120.36 km)
- Existed: 1964–present

Major junctions
- West end: SR 99 in Delano
- East end: SR 178 near Lake Isabella

Location
- Country: United States
- State: California
- Counties: Kern

Highway system
- State highways in California; Interstate; US; State; Scenic; History; Pre‑1964; Unconstructed; Deleted; Freeways
← SR 154	→ SR 156

State Route 155 (SR 155) is a state highway in the U.S. state of California connecting State Route 99 and State Route 178, going through the southern part of the Sierra Nevada mountain range. This highway runs from west to east. Its western terminus is in Delano and its eastern terminus is in the small town of Lake Isabella. Locally it is known as the Garces Highway.

== Route description ==
Route 155 is defined in section 455 of the California Streets and Highways Code, and that the highway is "from Route 99 near Delano to Route 178 near Isabella via Glennville".

SR 155 starts in Delano at SR 99. The route travels south on Fremont St. and then turns east onto Garces Hwy. From there, it leaves the city and enters agricultural land. Continuing east, it leaves the farmland just before crossing SR 65 (Porterville Hwy.). From there, it starts a gentle climb into the foothills of the Eastern San Joaquin Valley. The route reaches the small town of Woody, where it turns onto Bakersfield-Glennville Rd. The road then begins its steep climb, as it winds through the Greenhorn Mountains. It then reaches the small town of Glennville. At Glennville, the road turns onto Evans Rd, as it continues to travel east. It then reaches its highest elevation at Greenhorn Summit – 6102 ft – and starts its descent. The road crosses the small town of Alta Sierra. Continuing east, it enters the Kern River Valley. In the town of Wofford Heights, the route turns south onto Wofford Heights Blvd. It then travels along the western shore of Lake Isabella. The route then terminates at SR 178 in the town of Lake Isabella, south of the lake.

SR 155 in Delano is part of the National Highway System, a network of highways that are considered essential to the country's economy, defense, and mobility by the Federal Highway Administration.

== History ==
SR 155 was adopted as an unsigned state route in 1933 as Legislative Route 142. Originally it was defined to run from LRN 4 (signed as US 99, currently SR 204) near Bakersfield to LRN 57 (signed as SR 178) near Isabella via Glennville. The route started in Oildale, north of Bakersfield on Airport Dr. The route traveled north on Airport Dr, which becomes Bakersfield-Glennville Rd. It continues north, to the town of Woody, where it joins the current route. In 1963, when US 99 and LRN 141 where swapped, the definition was changed to run from LRN 141, instead of LRN 4. That definition never took effect since in 1964, all of the state routes were renumbered. LRN 142 became SR 155, and was defined to run from SR 204 near Bakersfield to SR 178 near Isabella via Glennville. That definition only lasted one year, since in 1965, the route was realigned to its current routing, which starts in Delano.

The western portion of the route was adopted as an unsigned state route in 1933 as Legislative Route 136. It ran from LRN 4 (signed US 99, currently SR 99) to LRN 129 (currently SR 65). In 1964, the route became a signed route as SR 211. This should not be confused with SR 211 in Humboldt County. That definition only lasted one year, since in 1965, the route became a part of SR 155. The state route was also extended east on Garces Hwy, to the town of Woody, where it connected with the existing SR 155 segment.

== Major intersections ==
Except where prefixed with a letter, postmiles were measured on the road as it was in 1964, based on the alignment that existed at the time, and do not necessarily reflect current mileage. Postmile prefixes include: R reflecting a realignment in the route since then, M indicating a second realignment, L referring to an overlap due to a correction or change, and T indicating postmiles classified as temporary. Segments that remain unconstructed or have been relinquished to local control may be omitted. The entire route is in Kern County.

Location	Postmile	Destinations	Notes
Delano	0.00	Garces Highway	Continuation beyond SR 99
Delano	0.00	SR 99 – Sacramento, Bakersfield, Los Angeles	Interchange; west end of SR 155; SR 99 north exit 56, south exit 56A
Delano	0.39	High Street	Former US 99
	R6.55	Famoso-Porterville Highway – Richgrove, Famoso	
	R10.99	SR 65 – Porterville, Bakersfield	
Woody	30.31	Woody Road – Bakersfield	Former SR 155 west
Wofford Heights	60.64	Wofford Boulevard – Kernville	
Lake Isabella	R70.99	SR 178 – Bakersfield, Ridgecrest	Interchange; east end of SR 155; SR 178 exit 43
Lake Isabella	R70.99	Kernville Road	Continuation beyond SR 178
1.000 mi = 1.609 km; 1.000 km = 0.621 mi

== References in popular culture ==
Route 155 (near the intersection with 6th Ave/Dairy Ave) was the location of the famous "crop duster" scene from the Alfred Hitchcock film North by Northwest. (35°45'38.9"N 119°33'42.0"W)
