= Kern Valley Airport =

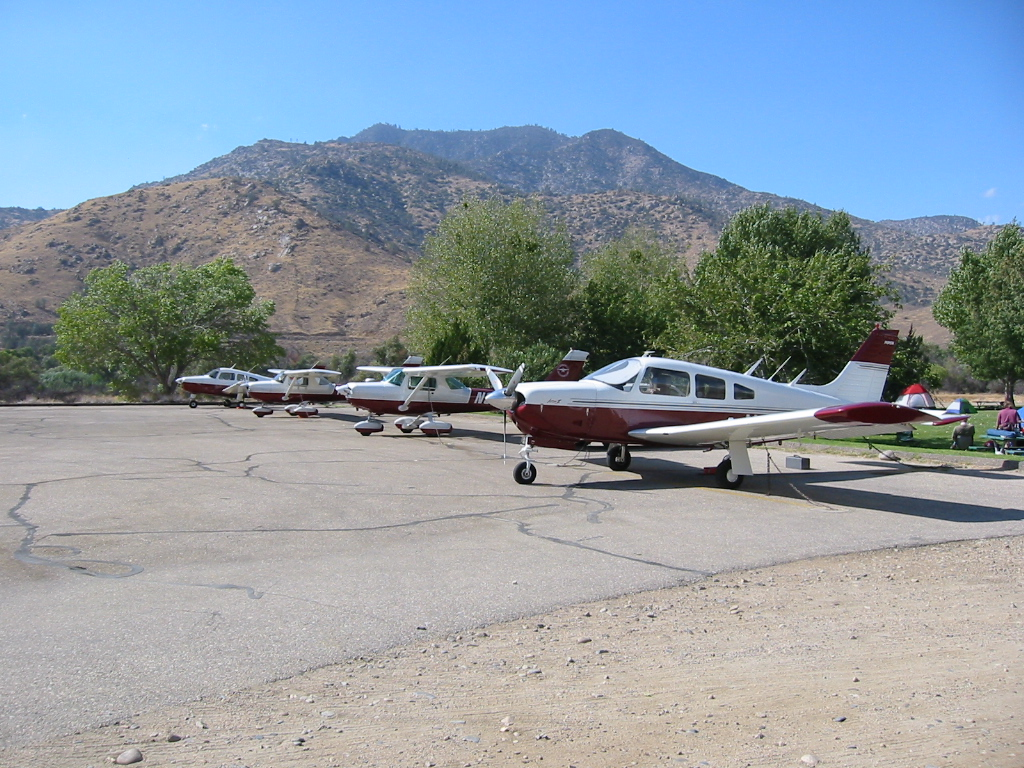
- Mt SAC Flying Team annual practice at L05
- IATA: none; ICAO: none; FAA LID: L05

Summary
- Airport type: Public
- Operator: County of Kern
- Location: Kernville, California
- Elevation AMSL: 2,614 ft (797 m)
- Coordinates: 35°43′42″N 118°25′11″W
- Interactive map of Kern Valley Airport

Runways
Direction	Length		Surface
Direction	ft	m	Surface
17/35	3,500	1,067	Asphalt (50 ft or 15 m wide)

Kern Valley Airport (FAA LID: L05) is a public airport located in the Kern River Valley, 3 miles (4.8 km) south of Kernville in Kern County, California, United States. It serves the Lake Isabella area in the Southern Sierra Nevada.

The airport is mostly used for general aviation.

== Facilities ==
Kern Valley Airport covers 270 acres (109 ha) and has one runway:

- Runway 17/35: 3,500 by 50 feet (1,067 by 15 m), surface: asphalt

== Use ==
The airport has an average of 28 operations per day.

Commercial	Air taxi	GA local	GA transient	Military
0	0	14	14	0

20 aircraft are based at the airport.

Single engine	Multi engine	Jet	Helicopter	Glider/ultralight	Military
20	0	0	0	0	0

== See also ==
- List of airports in Kern County, California
