= Kernville =

Kernville may refer to:

- Kernville, California
- Kernville (former town), California
- Kernville, Oregon
- Kernville, Pennsylvania
