= Nellie Dent Mine =

Abandoned quartz mine in Wofford Heights, California, USA

Coordinates: 35°43′0″N 118°26′33″W

Nellie E. Dent Quartz Mine
- The Nellie Dent Mine on a map of California.
- Location: California
- Products: Quartz, Gold
- Greatest depth: 150 feet
- Discovered: 1874
- Company: private company

The Nellie Dent Mine, officially the Nellie E. Dent Quartz Mine, and also known as the Contact Mine or Content Mine is an inoperational quartz mine in the Cove Mining District, in Wofford Heights, California, near the Sequoia National Forest. In addition to quartz, the mine also produced small amounts of gold.

== Mining ==
Although nothing is known about when the Nellie Dent Mine halted operations, it is established that the Nellie E. Dent claim (54.3 acres in area) was patented in 1874.

The Nellie Dent Mine's operations primarily occurred underground, and some sources claim an open-and-cut method was utilized. The maximum depth of the mine was approximately 150 feet. The ore shoot and opening shaft were 450 feet long.

The Nellie E. Dent gold vein was low-grade and hosted in Mesozoic granite. It was 1400 feet long and from 40 to 100 feet thick. There was approximately $5 of gold per ton of rock. The outcrop of quartz was 50 feet thick.

The mine was sold to a private entity in 2024 and there are no known plans to reopen the mine.
