= Alta Sierra, Kern County, California =

Unincorporated community in California, United States

Alta Sierra
- Unincorporated community Census-designated place
- Location in California Alta Sierra (the United States)
- Coordinates: 35°43′45.38″N 118°32′57.57″W
- Country: United States
- State: California
- County: Kern

Area
  - Total: 1.0 sq mi (2.6 km^{2})
  - Land: 1.0 sq mi (2.6 km^{2})
  - Water: 0 sq mi (0 km^{2})
- Elevation: 5,693 ft (1,735 m)

Population (2020)
  - Total: 103
  - Density: 100/sq mi (40/km^{2})
- Time zone: UTC-8 (Pacific)
  - Summer (DST): UTC-7 (PDT)
- GNIS feature ID: 2804107

Alta Sierra is an unincorporated community and census-designated place (CDP) in Kern County, California, United States.

It is located 8.5 miles (14 km) east of Glennville, at an elevation of 5,718 feet (1,743 m) in the Greenhorn Mountains/Sierra Nevada foothills. For statistical purposes, the United States Census Bureau has defined Alta Sierra as a census-designated place (CDP).

== Demographics ==
Historical population
Census	Pop.	Note	%±
2020	103		—
U.S. Decennial Census; 1860–1870 1880-1890; 1900 1910 1920; 1930 1940 1950; 1960 1970 1980; 1990 2000 2010; 2020

Alta Sierra first appeared as a census designated place in the 2020 U.S. census.

=== 2020 Census ===
Alta Sierra CDP, California – Racial and ethnic composition Note: the US Census treats Hispanic/Latino as an ethnic category. This table excludes Latinos from the racial categories and assigns them to a separate category. Hispanics/Latinos may be of any race.
Race / Ethnicity (NH = Non-Hispanic)	Pop 2020	% 2020
White alone (NH)	88	85.44%
Black or African American alone (NH)	0	0.00%
Native American or Alaska Native alone (NH)	4	3.88%
Asian alone (NH)	0	0.00%
Native Hawaiian or Pacific Islander alone (NH)	0	0.00%
Other race alone (NH)	0	0.00%
Mixed race or Multiracial (NH)	0	0.00%
Hispanic or Latino (any race)	11	10.68%
Total	103	100.00%
