= Wofford Heights, California =

Wofford Heights
- census-designated place
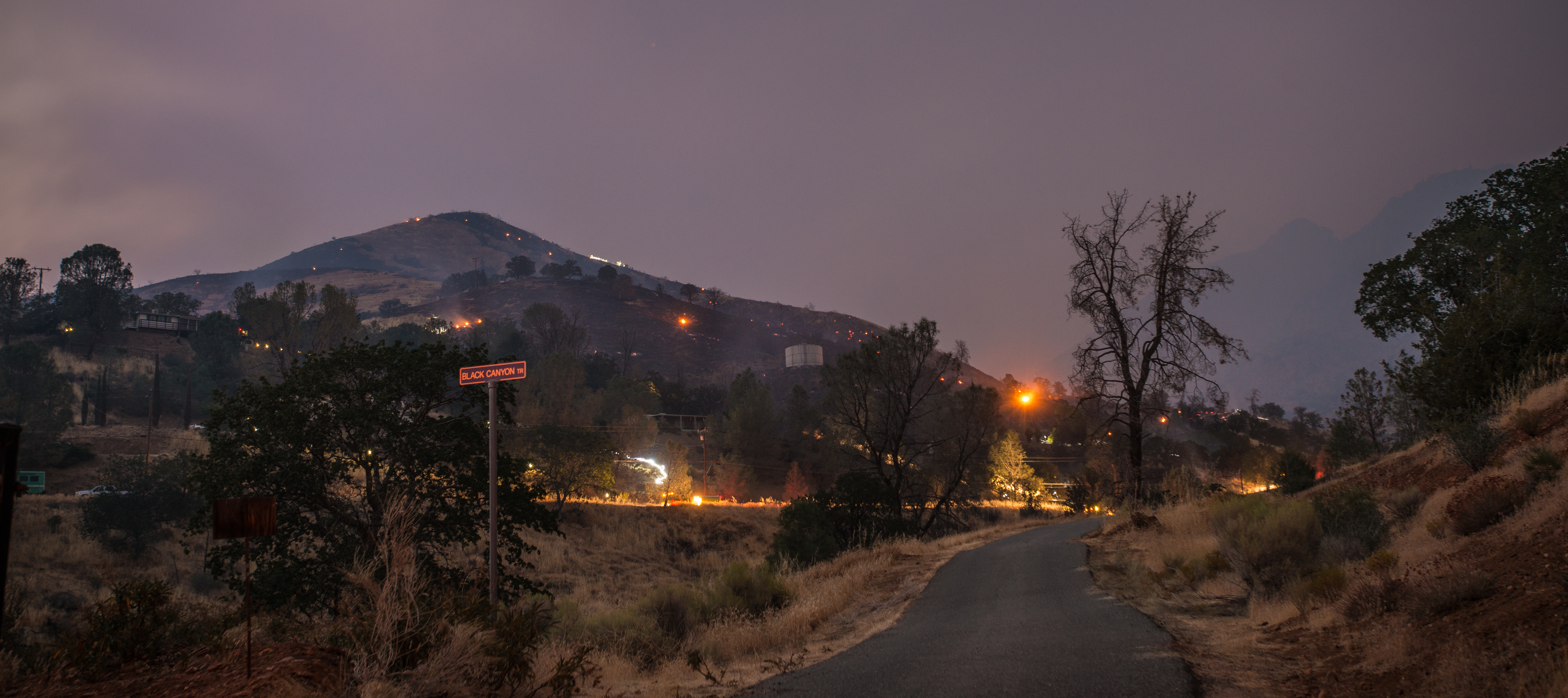
- Wofford Heights

- Location in Kern County and the state of California

- Location in the United States
- Coordinates: 35°42′25″N 118°27′22″W
- Country: United States
- State: California
- County: Kern

Government
  - State senator: Shannon Grove (R)
  - Assemblymember: Stan Ellis (R)
  - U. S. rep.: Vince Fong (R)

Area
  - Total: 6.40 sq mi (16.58 km^{2})
  - Land: 6.40 sq mi (16.58 km^{2})
  - Water: 0 sq mi (0 km^{2}) 0%
- Elevation: 2,684 ft (818 m)

Population (2020)
  - Total: 2,213
  - Density: 345.7/sq mi (133.5/km^{2})
- Time zone: UTC-8 (PST)
  - Summer (DST): UTC-7 (PDT)
- ZIP code: 93285
- Area codes: 442/760
- FIPS code: 06-86174
- GNIS feature ID: 1661706

Wofford Heights is a census-designated place (CDP) in the southern Sierra Nevada, in Kern County, California, United States. Wofford Heights is located in the west Kern River Valley, 3.5 miles (5.6 km) south-southwest of Kernville, at an elevation of 2,684 feet (818 m). The population was 2,213 at the 2020 census, up from 2,200 at the 2010 census.

== Geography ==
Wofford Heights is located at 35°42′25″N 118°27′22″W. California State Route 155 is the only highway in Wofford Heights, leading south to Lake Isabella and west through Alta Sierra and the Greenhorn Mountains.

According to the United States Census Bureau, the CDP has a total area of 6.4 square miles (17 km^{2}), all land.

=== Climate ===
According to the Köppen Climate Classification system, Wofford Heights has a semi-arid climate, abbreviated "BSk" on climate maps. Here, the summers can be brutal and have reached as high as 113 °F (45 °C) while the winters are a bit more mild and have gone as low as −3 °F (−19 °C). Wofford Heights' eastern front borders Lake Isabella. There are two major access points to the lake from Wofford Blvd: The first is the entrance to North Fork Marina and Tillie Creek Campground, and the second is Freear which is at the very end of East Evans Road near Wofford Heights Park.

== History ==
I.L. Wofford founded the community as a resort in 1948. The Wofford Heights post office opened in 1953. It was a location for the 1970 biker film Angels Die Hard.

In 2016 the Erskine and Cedar fires burned more than 77,000 acres and more than 300 structures. As of 2019 the Lake Isabella area was considered a "very high fire hazard severity zone" due to desert winds and the nearby Sequoia National Forest. In addition, the median age of residents is 62, and many live on narrow roads which would be poor escape routes.

== Demographics ==
Historical population
| Census | Pop. | Note | %± |
|---|---|---|---|
| 1980 | 2,112 | | — |
| 1990 | 2,270 | | 7.5% |
| 2000 | 2,276 | | 0.3% |
| 2010 | 2,200 | | −3.3% |
| 2020 | 2,213 | | 0.6% |
U.S. Decennial Census; 1860–1870 1880-1890; 1900 1910 1920; 1930 1940 1950; 1960 1970 1980; 1990 2000 2010; 2020

Wofford Heights first appeared as a census designated place in the 1980 United States census.

=== Racial and ethnic composition ===
Wofford Heights CDP, California – Racial and ethnic composition Note: the US Census treats Hispanic/Latino as an ethnic category. This table excludes Latinos from the racial categories and assigns them to a separate category. Hispanics/Latinos may be of any race.
| Race / Ethnicity (NH = Non-Hispanic) | Pop 2000 | Pop 2010 | Pop 2020 | % 2000 | % 2010 | % 2020 |
|---|---|---|---|---|---|---|
| White alone (NH) | 2,026 | 1,936 | 1,768 | 89.02% | 88.00% | 79.89% |
| Black or African American alone (NH) | 2 | 5 | 1 | 0.09% | 0.23% | 0.05% |
| Native American or Alaska Native alone (NH) | 22 | 34 | 35 | 0.97% | 1.55% | 1.58% |
| Asian alone (NH) | 11 | 8 | 17 | 0.48% | 0.36% | 0.77% |
| Native Hawaiian or Pacific Islander alone (NH) | 1 | 0 | 4 | 0.04% | 0.00% | 0.18% |
| Other race alone (NH) | 2 | 0 | 21 | 0.09% | 0.00% | 0.95% |
| Mixed race or Multiracial (NH) | 70 | 61 | 170 | 3.08% | 2.77% | 7.68% |
| Hispanic or Latino (any race) | 142 | 156 | 197 | 6.24% | 7.09% | 8.90% |
| Total | 2,276 | 2,200 | 2,213 | 100.00% | 100.00% | 100.00% |

=== 2020 census ===
As of the 2020 census, Wofford Heights had a population of 2,213 and a population density of 345.7 inhabitants per square mile (133.5/km^{2}).

The age distribution was 12.7% under the age of 18, 3.3% aged 18 to 24, 14.5% aged 25 to 44, 33.0% aged 45 to 64, and 36.6% who were 65 years of age or older. The median age was 59.6 years. For every 100 females, there were 102.7 males, and for every 100 females age 18 and over there were 103.9 males age 18 and over.

The whole population lived in households. There were 1,189 households, out of which 11.2% included children under the age of 18, 32.6% were married-couple households, 5.2% were cohabiting couple households, 31.1% had a female householder with no partner present, and 31.0% had a male householder with no partner present. 46.0% of households were one person, and 25.8% were one person aged 65 or older. The average household size was 1.86. There were 572 families (48.1% of all households).

There were 1,856 housing units at an average density of 290.0 units per square mile (112.0 units/km^{2}), of which 1,189 (64.1%) were occupied. Of these, 75.4% were owner-occupied and 24.6% were occupied by renters. Of all housing units, 35.9% were vacant, and the homeowner and rental vacancy rates were 3.1% and 9.9%, respectively.

Of the total population, 0.0% lived in urban areas and 100.0% lived in rural areas.

=== 2023 estimates ===
In 2023, the US Census Bureau estimated that the median household income was $40,168, and the per capita income was $36,040. About 10.1% of families and 16.1% of the population were below the poverty line.
