= Kern River Valley =

Valley and region of the Southern Sierra Nevada, in Kern County, California

Coordinates: 35.6232°N 118.4845°W

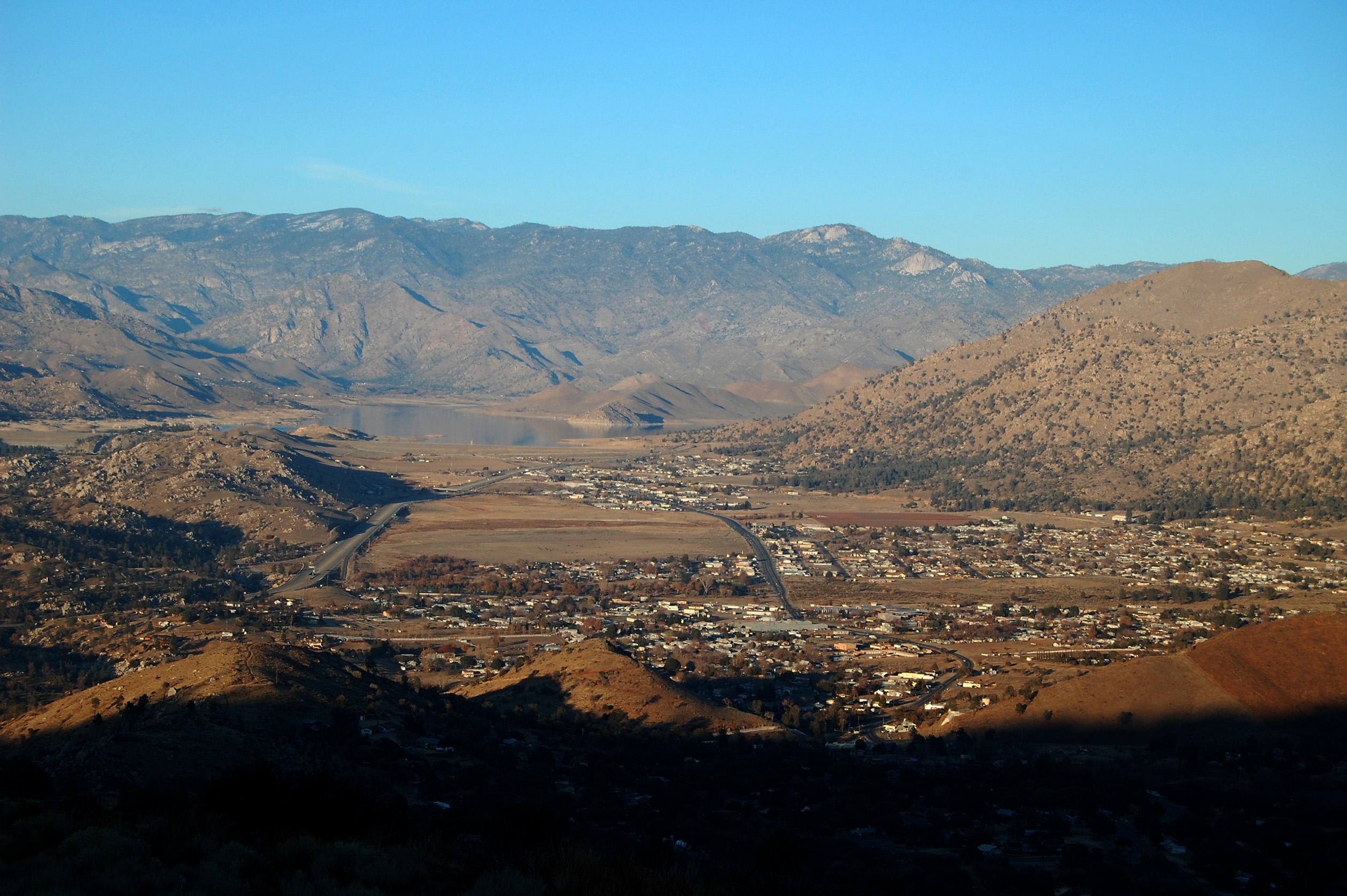
- Kern River Valley viewed from south
- Floor elevation: 2,800 feet (850 m)
- Length: 14 miles (23 km) East/West
- Width: 10 miles (16 km)
- Area: 110 square miles (280 km^{2})

Geography
- Location: Sierra Nevada; Kern County, California
- Population centers: Kernville; Lake Isabella; Weldon; Wofford Heights
- Borders on: Greenhorn Mountains; Breckenridge Mountain; Piute Mountain; Scodie Mountains; Kern Plateau
- Topo map: Kernville; Lake Isabella North; Lake Isabella South; Weldon
- Traversed by: State Route 155; State Route 178
- Interactive map of Kern River Valley

The Kern River Valley is a valley and region of the Southern Sierra Nevada, in Kern County, California.

== History ==
The valley was inhabited for millennia by the indigenous Tübatulabal and Kawaiisu people, and various bedrock mortar and pictograph sites can be found throughout the region. Their first recorded contact with European settlers was in May, 1834, when Joseph R. Walker scouted a mountain pass through the valley. He would return along the same route in December, 1845 as part of John C. Frémont's third expedition, this time with cartographer and artist Edward Kern. While exploring the valley, Kern camped at the fork of a river, once nearly drowning in its swift waters. In return for Kern's service to the expedition, Frémont named it the Kern River.

Gold was discovered near the valley in 1853, leading to the Kern River Gold Rush and the founding of Keyesville. On April 9, 1863, U.S. Army cavalry along with local settlers captured and executed 35 Tübatulabal and Kawaiisu men in what became known as the Keyesville massacre. Around 1860, a gold rush in the northern part of the valley led to the founding of another boom town, Whiskey Flat (renamed Kernville in 1864). The town of Weldon was founded in 1871, followed by Bodfish in 1892 and Isabella in 1893.

== Geography ==
The north and south forks of the Kern River meet in the valley, forming the lower portion which flows down to Bakersfield through Kern River Canyon. A dam was completed in 1953, creating the recreational Lake Isabella reservoir, the valley's dominant geographic feature. The towns of Kernville and Isabella were inundated by the reservoir and relocated, along with several historic structures, to their current lakeside locations. The Kern River Valley is bordered by subranges of the Sierra Nevada—the Kern Plateau to the northeast, Breckenridge Mountain and Piute Mountain to the south, the Scodie Mountains to the east and the Greenhorn Mountains to the west. Highways to and through the valley include State Route 155 and State Route 178.

=== Settlements ===
Towns in the valley include:

- Kernville
- Lake Isabella
- Weldon
- Wofford Heights
- Bodfish
- Mountain Mesa
- South Lake
- Riverkern

== Recreation ==
The Kern River Valley has a thriving tourism and outdoor recreation industry centered around its lake, rivers, and mountains. Camping, hunting and fishing are popular activities, as are white water rafting, boating, and other water sports. During wintertime, snow sports are possible in the surrounding Sierra Nevada mountains. Mountain biking, rock climbing and backpacking are possible year-round, and rental equipment and guide services are a crucial part of the local economy. Numerous hot springs, renowned by early settlers to the valley, can be found near the top of Kern River Canyon. Much of the Kern River Valley, including the shore of Lake Isabella, is part of Sequoia National Forest, and there are several campgrounds around the lake and along the river. The southernmost groves of Giant sequoia trees are about thirty miles northwest of the valley.
