= Lavers' Crossing, California =

Lavers' Crossing
- Former settlement
- Location in California Lavers' Crossing (the United States)
- Coordinates: 35°44′12″N 118°43′16″W
- Country: United States
- State: California
- County: Kern

California Historical Landmark
- Reference no.: 672

Lavers' Crossing is a former settlement in Kern County, California, United States. It was located 1 mile (1.6 km) west-northwest of Glennville, at the current junction of White River and Jack Ranch roads.

The town was founded by David Lavers, who settled there in 1858. For the following decade, Lavers' Crossing was the trading center for the surrounding Linn's valley before being supplanted in that role by Glennville. The site is now registered as California Historical Landmark #672. Mr. Myers built at store here in 1859 and later moved it to Glennville.

The California Historical Landmark number 672 reads:

NO. 672 LAVERS CROSSING - In 1854, John C. Reid filed a squatter's claim on this spot - the same year Kern County's first school class was held here. In 1859, David Lavers, with his father and brother, John, built a hotel and stage barn on the old Bull Road. The crossing was the principal community in Linn's Valley until about 1870. Date of marker registration February 16, 1959.

== See also ==
- California Historical Landmarks in Kern County
- California Historical Landmark
