= Glennville, California =

Unincorporated community in California, United States

Glennville, California Linn's Valley
- Unincorporated community Census-designated place
- Location in California Glennville, California (the United States)
- Coordinates: 35°43′27.10″N 118°42′54.78″W
- Country: United States
- State: California
- County: Kern County

Area
  - Total: 1.888 sq mi (4.89 km^{2})
  - Land: 1.888 sq mi (4.89 km^{2})
  - Water: 0 sq mi (0 km^{2})
- Elevation: 3,081 ft (939 m)

Population (2020)
  - Total: 131
  - Density: 69.4/sq mi (26.8/km^{2})
- Time zone: UTC-8 (Pacific)
  - Summer (DST): UTC-7 (PDT)
- GNIS feature ID: 2804407

Glennville (formerly Linn's Valley) is an unincorporated community and census-designated place (CDP) in Kern County, California.

As of the 2020 census, Glennville had a population of 158.

== Geography ==
It is located 30 miles (48 km) north-northeast of Bakersfield, at an elevation of 3,081 feet (939 m) in the Greenhorn Mountains foothills, a range of the Sierra Nevada.

== Climate ==
Glennville has a typically Californian Mediterranean climate (Köppen Csb, bordering on Csa). Summers are hot during the day, with 51.5 afternoons during an average year topping 90 °F or 32.2 °C, but mornings remains pleasantly cool and dry. Winter days are comfortable with January's maximum averaging 56.4 °F or 13.6 °C, but mornings are cold and 117.6 mornings fall to or below freezing each year, although no morning has ever fallen to 0 °F or −17.8 °C – the coldest temperature recorded since records began occurring on February 6, 1989, when the mercury fell to 1 °F (−17.2 °C).

Precipitation is heavily concentrated in the winter and averages around 19.3 inches or 490 millimetres or about three times that of Bakersfield on the valley floor. The wettest month has been December 2010 with 13.77 inches (349.8 mm), whilst the wettest “rain year” has been from July 1997 to June 1998 with 42.51 inches (1,079.8 mm) and the driest from July 1958 to June 1959 when only 7.82 inches (198.6 mm) fell. The wettest single day has been September 30, 1976 with 5.25 inches (133.4 mm); the only other day to top 4 inches or 101.6 millimetres being December 6, 1966 with 4.38 inches (111.3 mm). Snowfall averages 8.9 inches or 0.23 metres; the most in a month is 19.0 inches (0.48 m) in January 1982 and the most in a season 35.0 inches (0.89 m) between July 1998 and June 1999.

Climate data for Glennville, California, 1991–2020 normals, extremes 1951–2022
Month	Jan	Feb	Mar	Apr	May	Jun	Jul	Aug	Sep	Oct	Nov	Dec	Year
Record high °F (°C)	83 (28)	81 (27)	86 (30)	89 (32)	99 (37)	103 (39)	107 (42)	103 (39)	104 (40)	97 (36)	89 (32)	82 (28)	107 (42)
Mean maximum °F (°C)	71.4 (21.9)	72.1 (22.3)	75.5 (24.2)	80.9 (27.2)	87.6 (30.9)	94.8 (34.9)	98.7 (37.1)	98.0 (36.7)	94.1 (34.5)	87.3 (30.7)	78.8 (26.0)	72.1 (22.3)	100.2 (37.9)
Mean daily maximum °F (°C)	56.6 (13.7)	56.5 (13.6)	59.7 (15.4)	64.0 (17.8)	72.4 (22.4)	82.1 (27.8)	89.3 (31.8)	89.2 (31.8)	83.9 (28.8)	73.2 (22.9)	62.2 (16.8)	55.3 (12.9)	70.4 (21.3)
Daily mean °F (°C)	42.4 (5.8)	43.2 (6.2)	46.1 (7.8)	49.5 (9.7)	56.4 (13.6)	63.8 (17.7)	70.7 (21.5)	69.8 (21.0)	64.7 (18.2)	55.5 (13.1)	47.0 (8.3)	41.4 (5.2)	54.2 (12.3)
Mean daily minimum °F (°C)	28.3 (−2.1)	29.8 (−1.2)	32.5 (0.3)	35.0 (1.7)	40.5 (4.7)	45.6 (7.6)	52.1 (11.2)	50.4 (10.2)	45.4 (7.4)	37.9 (3.3)	31.7 (−0.2)	27.4 (−2.6)	38.0 (3.3)
Mean minimum °F (°C)	19.9 (−6.7)	20.1 (−6.6)	24.0 (−4.4)	25.8 (−3.4)	31.2 (−0.4)	35.9 (2.2)	45.0 (7.2)	43.5 (6.4)	37.1 (2.8)	29.6 (−1.3)	22.1 (−5.5)	18.1 (−7.7)	15.3 (−9.3)
Record low °F (°C)	6 (−14)	1 (−17)	9 (−13)	19 (−7)	22 (−6)	28 (−2)	36 (2)	31 (−1)	29 (−2)	15 (−9)	10 (−12)	3 (−16)	1 (−17)
Average precipitation inches (mm)	3.65 (93)	3.53 (90)	3.09 (78)	1.73 (44)	0.83 (21)	0.19 (4.8)	0.08 (2.0)	0.08 (2.0)	0.13 (3.3)	0.86 (22)	1.94 (49)	3.30 (84)	19.41 (493.1)
Average snowfall inches (cm)	1.3 (3.3)	1.6 (4.1)	1.6 (4.1)	0.4 (1.0)	0.0 (0.0)	0.0 (0.0)	0.0 (0.0)	0.0 (0.0)	0.0 (0.0)	0.0 (0.0)	0.1 (0.25)	1.2 (3.0)	6.2 (16)
Average precipitation days (≥ 0.01 in)	8.9	9.1	7.7	6.0	3.6	0.8	0.7	0.5	0.8	2.9	5.8	8.0	54.8
Average snowy days (≥ 0.1 in)	0.8	1.0	0.8	0.2	0.0	0.0	0.0	0.0	0.0	0.0	0.1	0.8	3.7
Source: NOAA

== History ==
The first white settlers in the area were George Ely and William Linn, who arrived together in 1854. Ely died in 1859 and Linn left the area around the same time. Linn's Valley post office opened in 1860 and the town changed its name to Glennville in 1872. The name honors James Madison Glenn, a blacksmith who settled the area in 1857 and opened the town's first hotel. Glennville became the last stop on the stagecoach line from Visalia and the trading center for the surrounding valley after the decline of Lavers' Crossing. In 1860, a state-funded wagon road from Glennville to Kernville was laid out by Thomas Baker, a civil engineer and founder of Bakersfield. A tribute to his ingenuity is that today's State Route 155 still follows Baker's route, originally known as the McFarlane Road, almost entirely.

Glennville remains a quiet country town with one restaurant and no gas station. The southernmost grove of Giant Sequoia trees, Deer Creek Grove, is located about ten miles northeast of Glennville. The Glennville adobe, built before the Civil War, still stands along Route 155 next to the fire station and is the oldest building in Kern County. The oldest standing church in the county, dating to 1866, stands nearby.

== Demographics ==
Historical population
Census	Pop.	Note	%±
2020	158		—
U.S. Decennial Census; 1860–1870 1880-1890; 1900 1910 1920; 1930 1940 1950; 1960 1970 1980; 1990 2000 2010; 2020

Glennville first appeared as a census designated place in the 2020 U.S. census.

=== 2020 Census ===
Glennville CDP, California – Racial and ethnic composition Note: the US Census treats Hispanic/Latino as an ethnic category. This table excludes Latinos from the racial categories and assigns them to a separate category. Hispanics/Latinos may be of any race.
Race / Ethnicity (NH = Non-Hispanic)	Pop 2020	% 2020
White alone (NH)	140	88.61%
Black or African American alone (NH)	0	0.00%
Native American or Alaska Native alone (NH)	6	3.80%
Asian alone (NH)	3	1.90%
Native Hawaiian or Pacific Islander alone (NH)	0	0.00%
Other race alone (NH)	3	1.90%
Mixed race or Multiracial (NH)	2	1.27%
Hispanic or Latino (any race)	4	2.53%
Total	158	100.00%
