= Kern River Canyon =

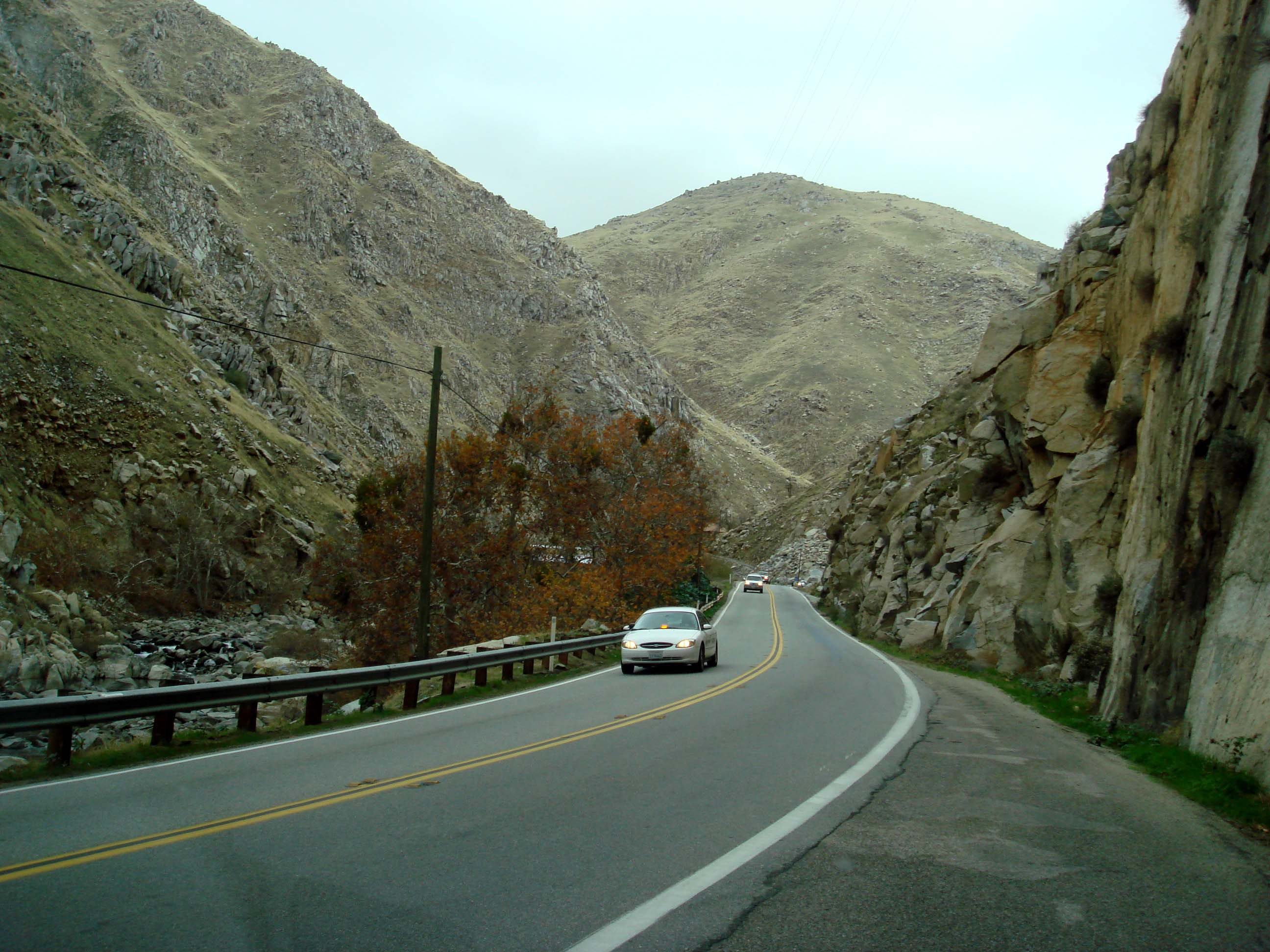
- Kern River Canyon from SR 178, near the canyon floor. Kern River is visible on the left.
- Floor elevation: 800 to 2,400 feet (240 to 730 m)
- Length: 20 miles (32 km) East/West
- Width: 1 mile (1.6 km) at top
- Depth: 1,500 to 2,000 feet (460 to 610 m)

Geography
- Location: Kern County, California
- Coordinates: 35°41′45″N 118°40′4″W
- Traversed by: State Route 178
- Interactive map of Kern River Canyon

The Kern River Canyon is a canyon in Kern County, California. It is located in the Southern Sierra Nevada.

The canyon was formed by the Kern River and connects the Kern River Valley and southern San Joaquin Valley. California State Route 178 (Kern Canyon Road) follows the canyon, from east of Bakersfield up to the Lake Isabella area.
