= Kernville (former town), California =

Kernville Whiskey Flat, Rogersville, Williamsburg
- Former settlement
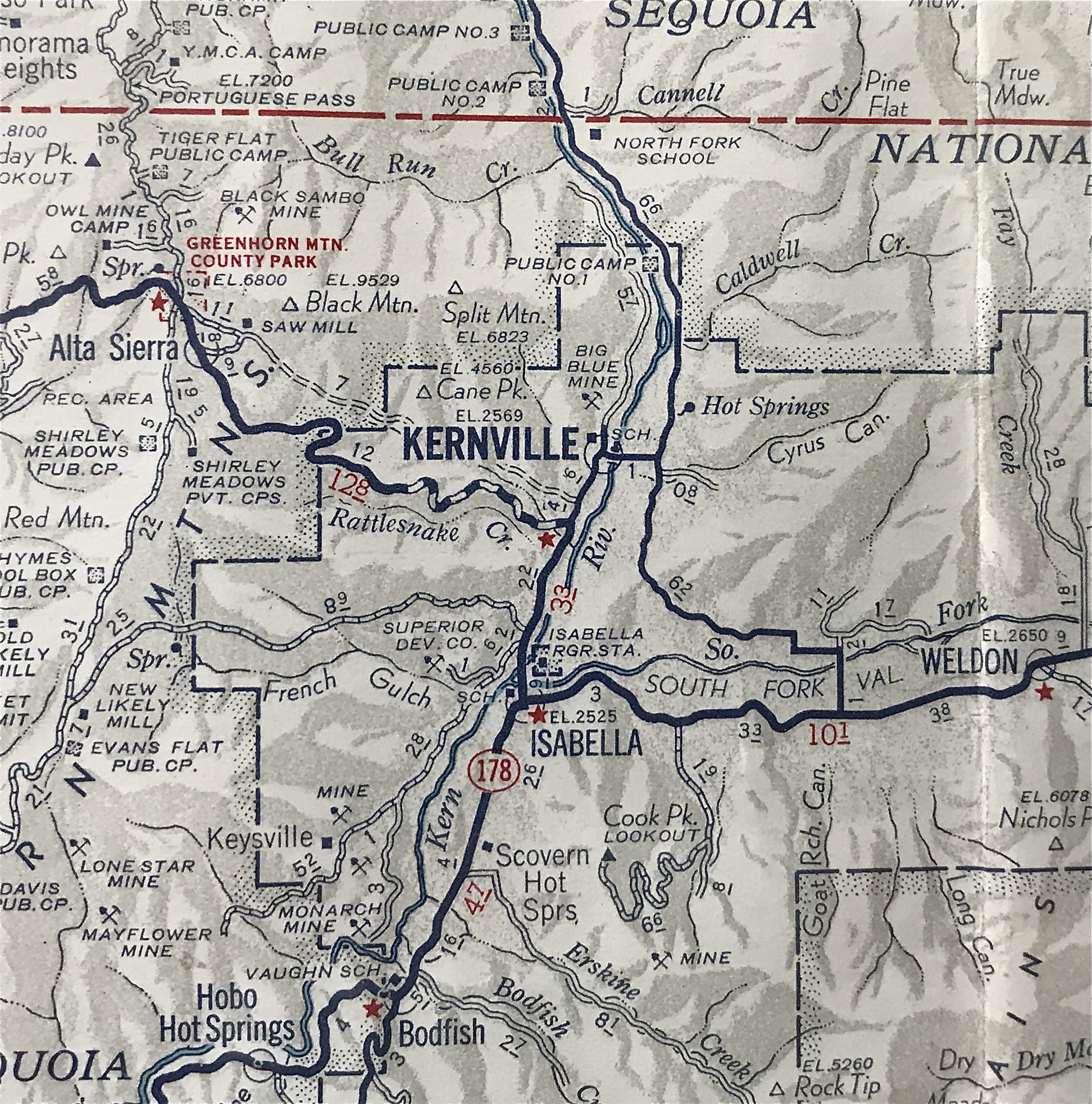
- 1941 map of Kernville area

- Location in California Location within the United States
- Coordinates: 35°42′51″N 118°26′12″W
- Country: United States
- State: California
- County: Kern
- Elevation: 2,575 ft (785 m)

Kernville (previously Whiskey Flat, Rogersville, and Williamsburg) is a former settlement in the Kern River Valley of the Sierra Nevada, in Kern County, California, United States. It lay at an elevation of 2,575 feet (785 m) near the present-day town of Wofford Heights; the site was submerged under the Lake Isabella reservoir in 1954. The original townsite, parts of which are revealed when lake levels are low, is registered as California Historical Landmark #132.

== History ==
An 1858 gold rush, caused by the discovery of the Big Blue Mine nearby, led to the formation of a town on the flats along the Kern River. Briefly called Rogersville (after the man who first found gold in the area while chasing his mule) and Williamsburg, it was renamed Whiskey Flat in 1863 after a saloon opened in the previously "dry" town. In 1864 it was renamed again to Kernville. The post office formerly at Keysville was moved to Kernville and operated there from 1868 to 1951, when service was moved to the new Kernville.

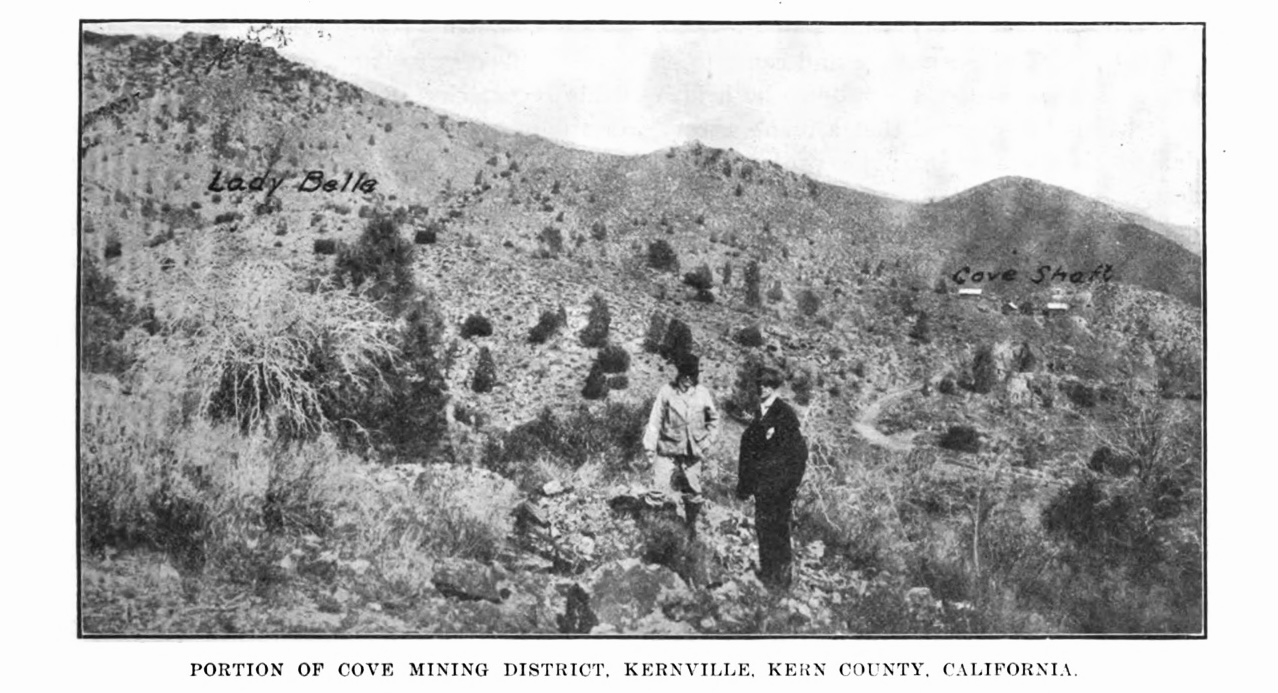
"Activity at Old Gold Camp of Kernville," June 1919

Hollywood producers shot many films, mostly Westerns, in the town.

The damming of the Kern River to create the Lake Isabella reservoir submerged the town in 1954. Most buildings were dismantled or relocated to higher ground in advance of the lake filling. Some building foundations are visible when lake levels are low.

In 2023, the lake refilled completely due to melted snow in the Sierra Nevada mountains, once again fully submerging the ghost town.

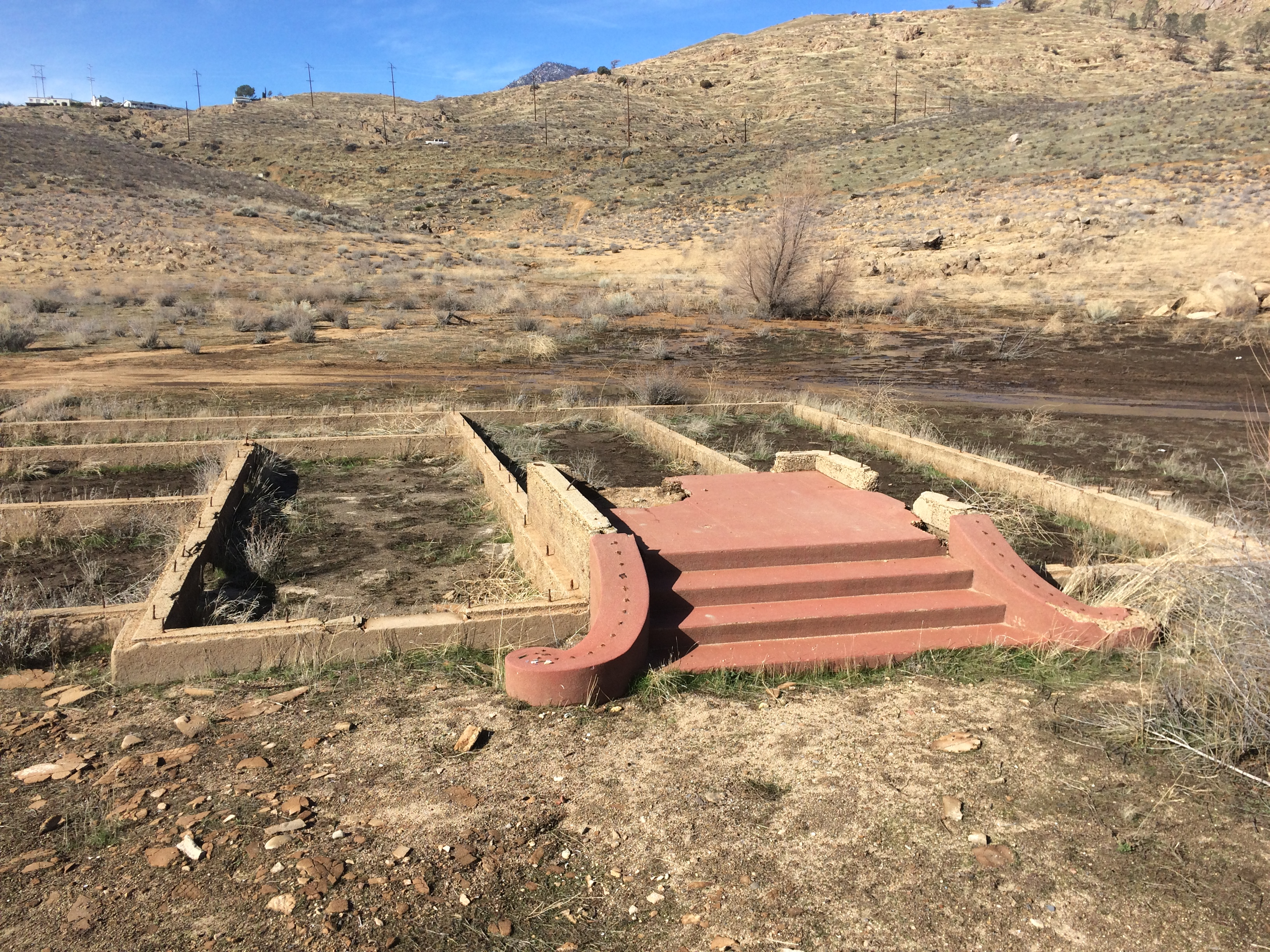
Foundations of the town grammar school

== See also ==
- List of ghost towns in California
- Kern River Valley topics
- History of Kern County, California
