= Kernville, California =

Kernville
- census-designated place
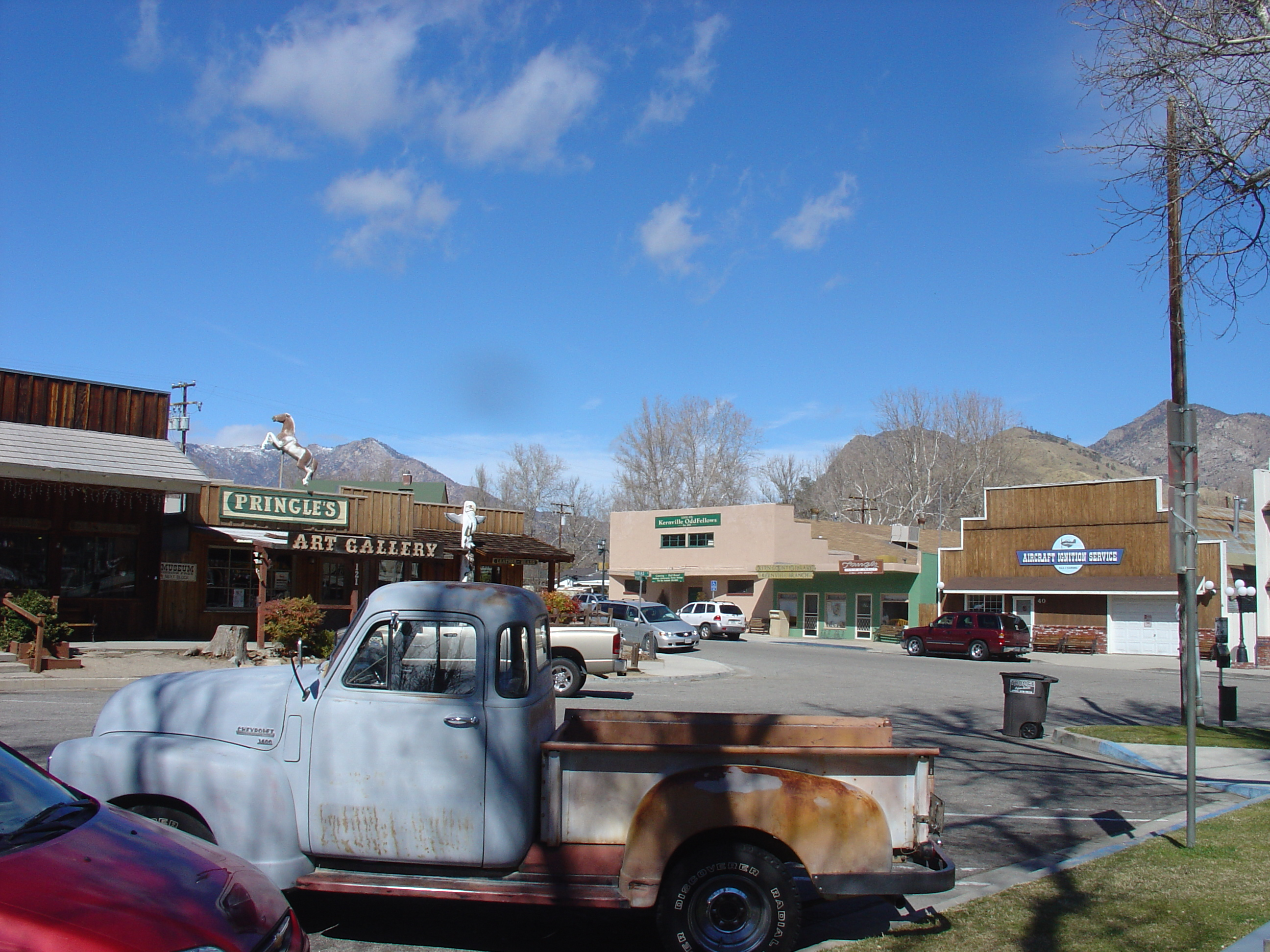
- Downtown Kernville

- Location in Kern County and the state of California

- Location in the United States
- Coordinates: 35°45′17″N 118°25′31″W
- Country: United States
- State: California
- County: Kern

Government
  - State senator: Shannon Grove (R)
  - Assemblymember: Stan Ellis (R)
  - U. S. rep.: Vince Fong (R)

Area
  - Total: 12.944 sq mi (33.525 km^{2})
  - Land: 12.636 sq mi (32.728 km^{2})
  - Water: 0.308 sq mi (0.797 km^{2}) 2.38%
- Elevation: 2,667 ft (813 m)

Population (2020)
  - Total: 1,549
  - Density: 122.6/sq mi (47.33/km^{2})
- Time zone: UTC-8 (PST)
  - Summer (DST): UTC-7 (PDT)
- ZIP code: 93238
- Area codes: 442/760
- FIPS code: 06-38310
- GNIS feature ID: 1660834
- Website

California Historical Landmark
- Reference no.: 132

Kernville is a census-designated place (CDP) in the southern Sierra Nevada, in Kern County, California, United States. Kernville is located 42 miles (68 km) northeast of Bakersfield, at an elevation of 2,667 feet (813 m). The population was 1,549 at the 2020 United States census, up from 1,395 at the 2010 census, but below the 2000 census total of 1,736.

== History ==
The Kern River was named after artist and topographer Edward Kern, who accompanied John C. Fremont on his 1845 expedition. They camped at what was a fork of two rivers, now the middle of Lake Isabella. An 1858 gold rush led to the formation of a town briefly called Rogersville, then Williamsburg, which was in 1863 renamed Whiskey Flat after a bar opened. In 1864, the town was renamed Kernville.

After decades of planning, the Isabella Dam project began in 1948. As a result, Kernville was relocated upstream to its present location at the tip of the northeast fork of the man-made lake, along with certain historic buildings. Downtown visibly retains Kernville's gold rush and Old West roots, attracting tourists along with the area's natural scenery and outdoor activities. The town's original location is slightly east of Wofford Heights. Foundations and other remnants can still be seen when the lake is low. The famous Mountain Inn, built mainly to house movie stars and crew before the 1948 move, is now (partially) at the new Kernville, renamed the River View Lodge.

Whiskey Flat Days is the annual celebration of the area's Wild West roots. A parade, historical re-enactments, pioneer-style camps, a carnival, street vendors and rodeo are just part of the festivities put on every President's Day weekend and attended by thousands of visitors.

Even with its annual summer influx of tourists, Kernville remains one of the most quaint, conservative relics of early California. Many local families trace their lineage to original 19th century homesteaders. The post office, established at the original site in 1868, was moved to the new site in 1951.

The original townsite is now registered as California Historical Landmark #132.

== Geography ==
=== Climate ===
Climate type occurs primarily on the periphery of the true deserts in low-latitude semiarid steppe regions.

Climate data for Kernville
Month	Jan	Feb	Mar	Apr	May	Jun	Jul	Aug	Sep	Oct	Nov	Dec	Year
Record high °F (°C)	73 (23)	76 (24)	80 (27)	88 (31)	95 (35)	102 (39)	105 (41)	105 (41)	101 (38)	93 (34)	81 (27)	73 (23)	105 (41)
Mean daily maximum °F (°C)	59.9 (15.5)	62.9 (17.2)	66.6 (19.2)	72.4 (22.4)	81.0 (27.2)	90.5 (32.5)	97.5 (36.4)	96.7 (35.9)	90.9 (32.7)	80.3 (26.8)	67.3 (19.6)	60.2 (15.7)	77.2 (25.1)
Mean daily minimum °F (°C)	32.6 (0.3)	35.3 (1.8)	38.2 (3.4)	42.8 (6.0)	50.3 (10.2)	58.3 (14.6)	64.3 (17.9)	63.1 (17.3)	57.3 (14.1)	47.8 (8.8)	37.8 (3.2)	32.4 (0.2)	46.7 (8.2)
Record low °F (°C)	11 (−12)	14 (−10)	21 (−6)	26 (−3)	29 (−2)	39 (4)	42 (6)	44 (7)	35 (2)	23 (−5)	18 (−8)	10 (−12)	10 (−12)
Average precipitation inches (mm)	2.73 (69)	2.58 (66)	2.04 (52)	0.83 (21)	0.29 (7.4)	0.13 (3.3)	0.14 (3.6)	0.22 (5.6)	0.36 (9.1)	0.43 (11)	1.39 (35)	1.79 (45)	12.93 (328)
Average snowfall inches (cm)	0.3 (0.76)	0.2 (0.51)	0.1 (0.25)	0.1 (0.25)	0.0 (0.0)	0.0 (0.0)	0.0 (0.0)	0.0 (0.0)	0.0 (0.0)	0.0 (0.0)	0.0 (0.0)	0.4 (1.0)	1.1 (2.77)
Source: NOAA

== Points of interest ==
Kernville has a large tourist industry centered on the white water rapids of the Kern River. While white water rafting and kayaking are the main attractions, one can also enjoy mountain biking, rock climbing, and other outdoor activities. Fly fishing is also popular; in particular, the golden trout is highly sought after for catch and release fishing. Downtown Kernville has an Old West look and contains a number of restaurants, antique shops and motels. The Kern Valley Museum houses a collection of historical items and displays.

== Demographics ==
Historical population
Census	Pop.	Note	%±
1980	1,660		—
1990	1,656		−0.2%
2000	1,736		4.8%
2010	1,395		−19.6%
2020	1,549		11.0%
U.S. Decennial Census; 1860–1870 1880-1890; 1900 1910 1920; 1930 1940 1950; 1960 1970 1980; 1990 2000 2010; 2020

Kernville first appeared as a census-designated place in the 1980 United States census.

=== Racial and ethnic composition ===
Kernville CDP, California – Racial and ethnic composition Note: the US Census treats Hispanic/Latino as an ethnic category. This table excludes Latinos from the racial categories and assigns them to a separate category. Hispanics/Latinos may be of any race.
Race / Ethnicity (NH = Non-Hispanic)	Pop 2000	Pop 2010	Pop 2020	% 2000	% 2010	% 2020
White alone (NH)	1,476	1,218	1,251	85.02%	87.31%	80.76%
Black or African American alone (NH)	21	1	9	1.21%	0.07%	0.58%
Native American or Alaska Native alone (NH)	34	18	16	1.96%	1.29%	1.03%
Asian alone (NH)	11	7	24	0.63%	0.50%	1.55%
Native Hawaiian or Pacific Islander alone (NH)	1	0	1	0.06%	0.00%	0.06%
Other race alone (NH)	0	1	9	0.00%	0.07%	0.58%
Mixed race or Multiracial (NH)	51	68	83	2.94%	4.87%	5.36%
Hispanic or Latino (any race)	142	82	156	8.18%	5.88%	10.07%
Total	1,736	1,395	1,549	100.00%	100.00%	100.00%

=== 2020 census ===
As of the 2020 census, Kernville had a population of 1,549. The population density was 122.6 inhabitants per square mile (47.3/km^{2}). The racial makeup of Kernville was 1,276 (82.4%) White, 9 (0.6%) African American, 19 (1.2%) Native American, 24 (1.5%) Asian, 1 (0.1%) Pacific Islander, 57 (3.7%) from other races, and 163 (10.5%) from two or more races. Hispanic or Latino of any race were 156 persons (10.1%).

The census reported that 97.0% of the population lived in households, 15 people (1.0%) lived in non-institutionalized group quarters, and 31 (2.0%) were institutionalized.

0.0% of residents lived in urban areas, while 100.0% lived in rural areas.

There were 787 households, out of which 109 (13.9%) had children under the age of 18 living in them, 305 (38.8%) were married-couple households, 47 (6.0%) were cohabiting couple households, 252 (32.0%) had a female householder with no partner present, and 183 (23.3%) had a male householder with no partner present. 340 households (43.2%) were one person, and 200 (25.4%) were one person aged 65 or older. The average household size was 1.91. There were 401 families (51.0% of all households).

The age distribution was 220 people (14.2%) under the age of 18, 64 people (4.1%) aged 18 to 24, 255 people (16.5%) aged 25 to 44, 456 people (29.4%) aged 45 to 64, and 554 people (35.8%) who were 65 years of age or older. The median age was 58.0 years. For every 100 females, there were 99.4 males, and for every 100 females age 18 and over, there were 93.4 males age 18 and over.

There were 1,117 housing units at an average density of 88.4 units per square mile (34.1 units/km^{2}), of which 787 (70.5%) were occupied. Of these, 586 (74.5%) were owner-occupied, and 201 (25.5%) were occupied by renters. Of all housing units, 29.5% were vacant, with a homeowner vacancy rate of 3.2% and a rental vacancy rate of 7.8%.

== Transportation ==
The city is served by the Kern Valley Airport, three miles (4.8 km) south of town. The airport features a fly-in campground on site. An airfield cafe serves both pilots and visitors.

The city is also served by Kern Transit, connecting the Kern River Valley with the rest of the county.

== California Historical Landmark ==
The California Historical Landmark reads:

NO. 132 KERNVILLE - Called Whiskey Flat until 1864, Kernville was founded in 1860 when whiskey dealer Adam Hamilton moved shop here from more temperate Quartzburg, founded earlier that year. Both camps resulted from a discovery by 'Lovely' Rogers, who found the Big Blue Ledge while tracking a stray mule from the earlier camp of Keysville.

The marker is located in the Old Kernville Cemetery, with a registration date of January 31, 1934.

== See also ==
- California Historical Landmarks in Kern County
- California Historical Landmark
