= Lake Isabella, California =

Lake Isabella
- census-designated place
- Location in Kern County and the state of California

- Location in the United States
- Coordinates: 35°37′05″N 118°28′23″W
- Country: United States
- State: California
- County: Kern

Government
  - State senator: Shannon Grove (R)
  - Assemblymember: Stan Ellis (R)
  - U. S. rep.: Vince Fong (R)

Area
  - Total: 22.138 sq mi (57.338 km^{2})
  - Land: 21.714 sq mi (56.240 km^{2})
  - Water: 0.424 sq mi (1.098 km^{2}) 1.9%
- Elevation: 2,513 ft (766 m)

Population (2020)
  - Total: 3,573
  - Density: 164.5/sq mi (63.53/km^{2})
- Time zone: UTC-8 (PST)
  - Summer (DST): UTC-7 (PDT)
- ZIP code: 93240
- Area codes: 442/760
- FIPS code: 06-39570
- GNIS feature ID: 1652739

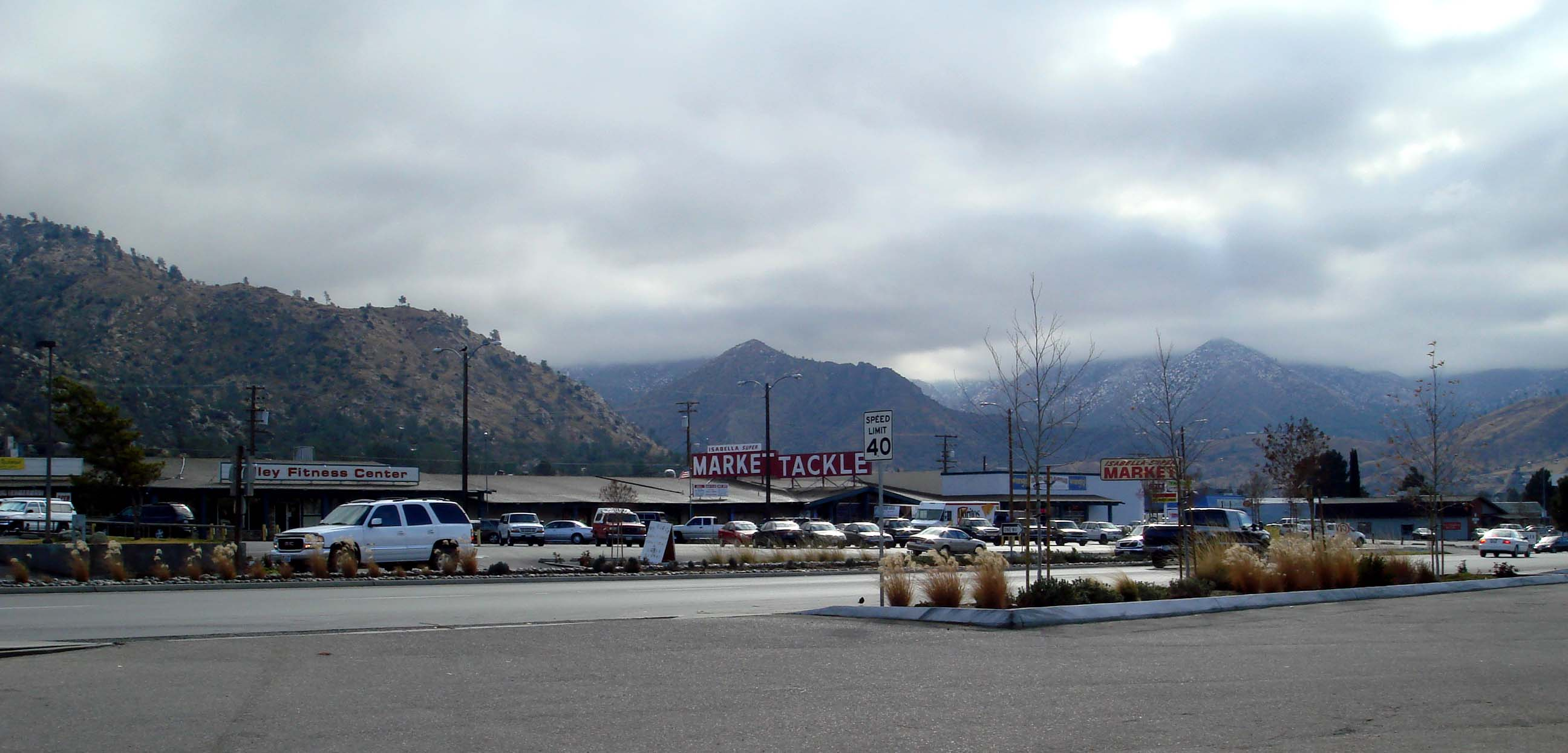
Lake Isabella along Lake Isabella Blvd.

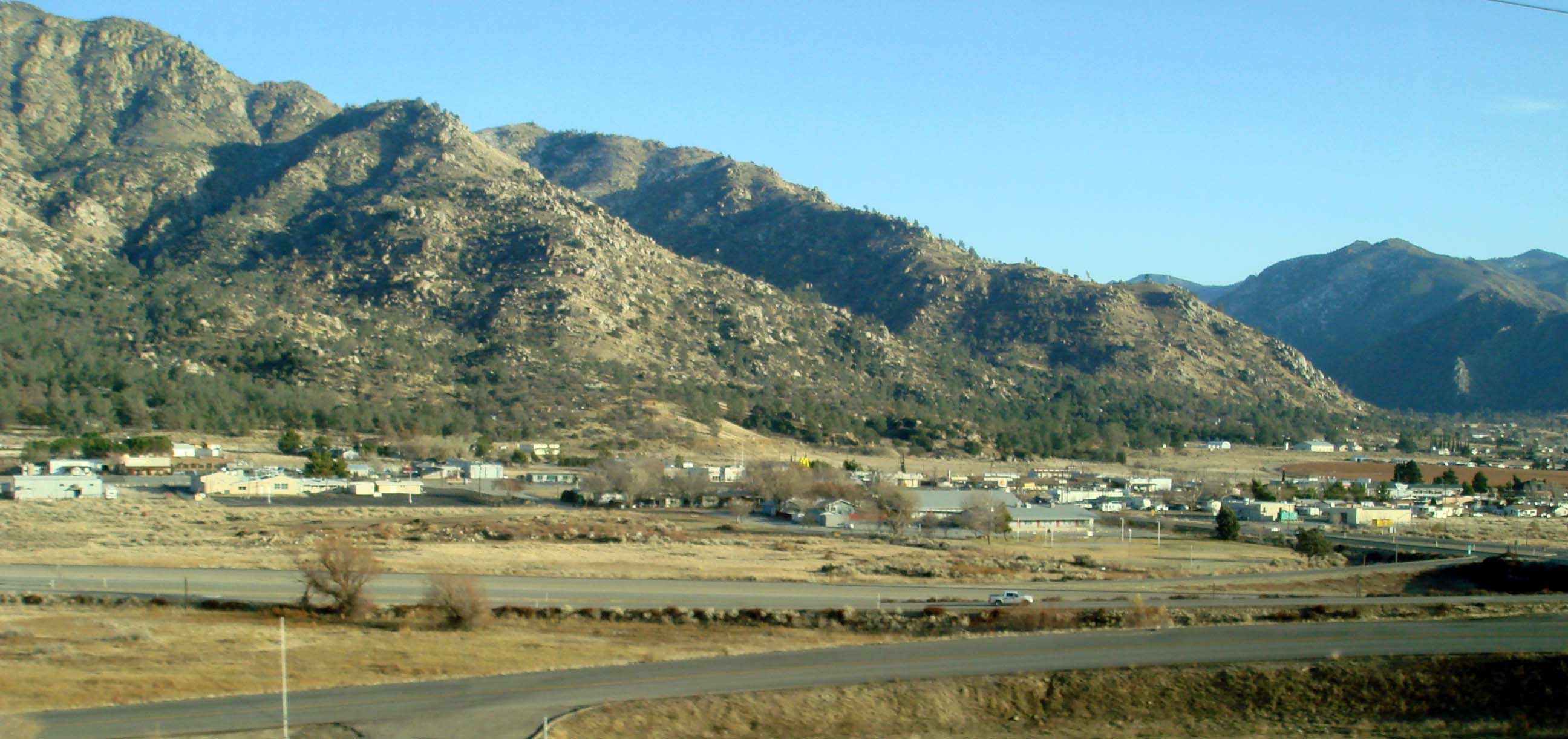
Lake Isabella from Hwy 155

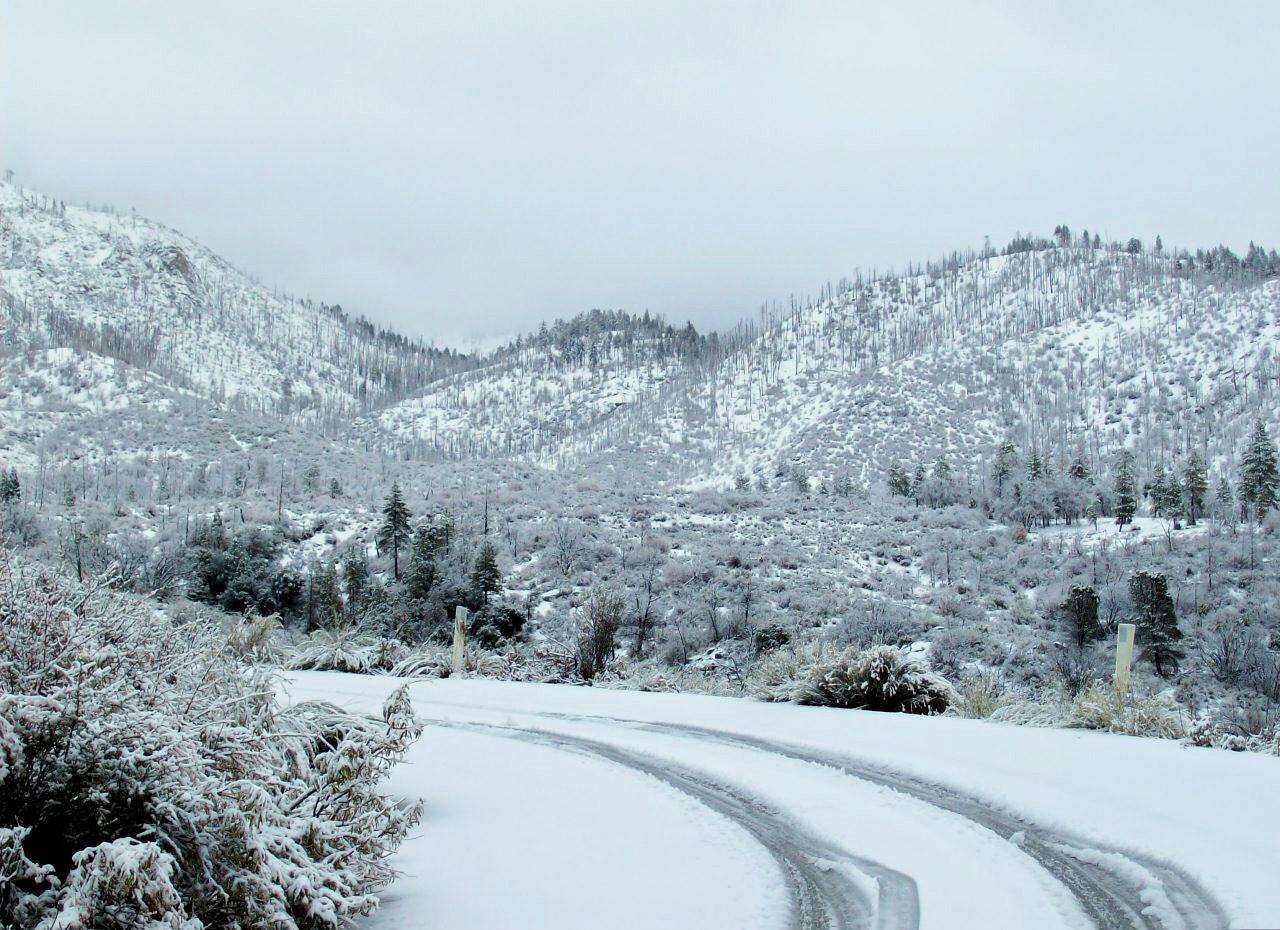
Snow on the mountains.

Lake Isabella (formerly, Isabella) is a census-designated place (CDP) in the southern Sierra Nevada, in Kern County, California, United States. It is named after the Lake Isabella reservoir and located at the lake’s southwestern edge, 6 miles (9.7 km) south of Wofford Heights in the Kern River Valley.

The town of Lake Isabella is located 35 miles (56 km) east-northeast of Bakersfield, at an elevation of 2,513 feet (766 m). The population was 3,573 at the 2020 census, up from 3,466 at the 2010 census.

== Geography ==
Lake Isabella is located in Hot Springs Valley, part of the Kern River Valley, at 35°37′05″N 118°28′23″W.

According to the United States Census Bureau, the CDP has a total area of 22.1 square miles (57 km^{2}), over 98% of which is land.

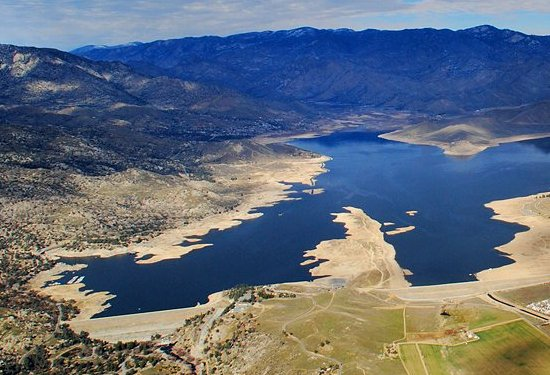
Aerial: Lake Isabella

Lake Isabella is at the confluence of the North and South Forks of the Kern River. These rivers are 'wild', in that they are not controlled by any dam upstream. Upstream on the North Fork white water enthusiasts play in the spring and early summer. The famous Golden Trout originate in these rivers in the high country to the north.

== History ==
The area was inhabited for millennia by the indigenous Tübatulabal and Owens Valley Paiute. Gold was discovered nearby in 1853, leading to a gold rush and the founding of Keyesville. The 1863 Keyesville massacre occurred a few miles north.

The town of Isabella was founded by Steven Barton in 1893 and named in honor of Queen Isabella of Spain while her name was popular during the 1893 Columbian Exposition. Lake Isabella was created in 1953 by a dam on the Kern River, forcing the town to move about 1.5 miles (2.4 km) south of the original site. The Isabella post office, which had opened in 1896, operated at the new site; the name was changed to Lake Isabella in 1957.

The dam's reservoir also inundated the original site of Kernville. Like Isabella, it was relocated, along with several of its historic buildings, to higher ground.

The area is a joy for hikers, boaters, water skiers, fishermen, birders, hunters, wind surfers, kayakers, and other outdoor recreationists. Tourist trade is a major part of the area's economy.

== Demographics ==
Historical population
Census	Pop.	Note	%±
1980	3,428		—
1990	3,323		−3.1%
2000	3,315		−0.2%
2010	3,466		4.6%
2020	3,573		3.1%
U.S. Decennial Census; 1860–1870 1880-1890; 1900 1910 1920; 1930 1940 1950; 1960 1970 1980; 1990 2000 2010; 2020

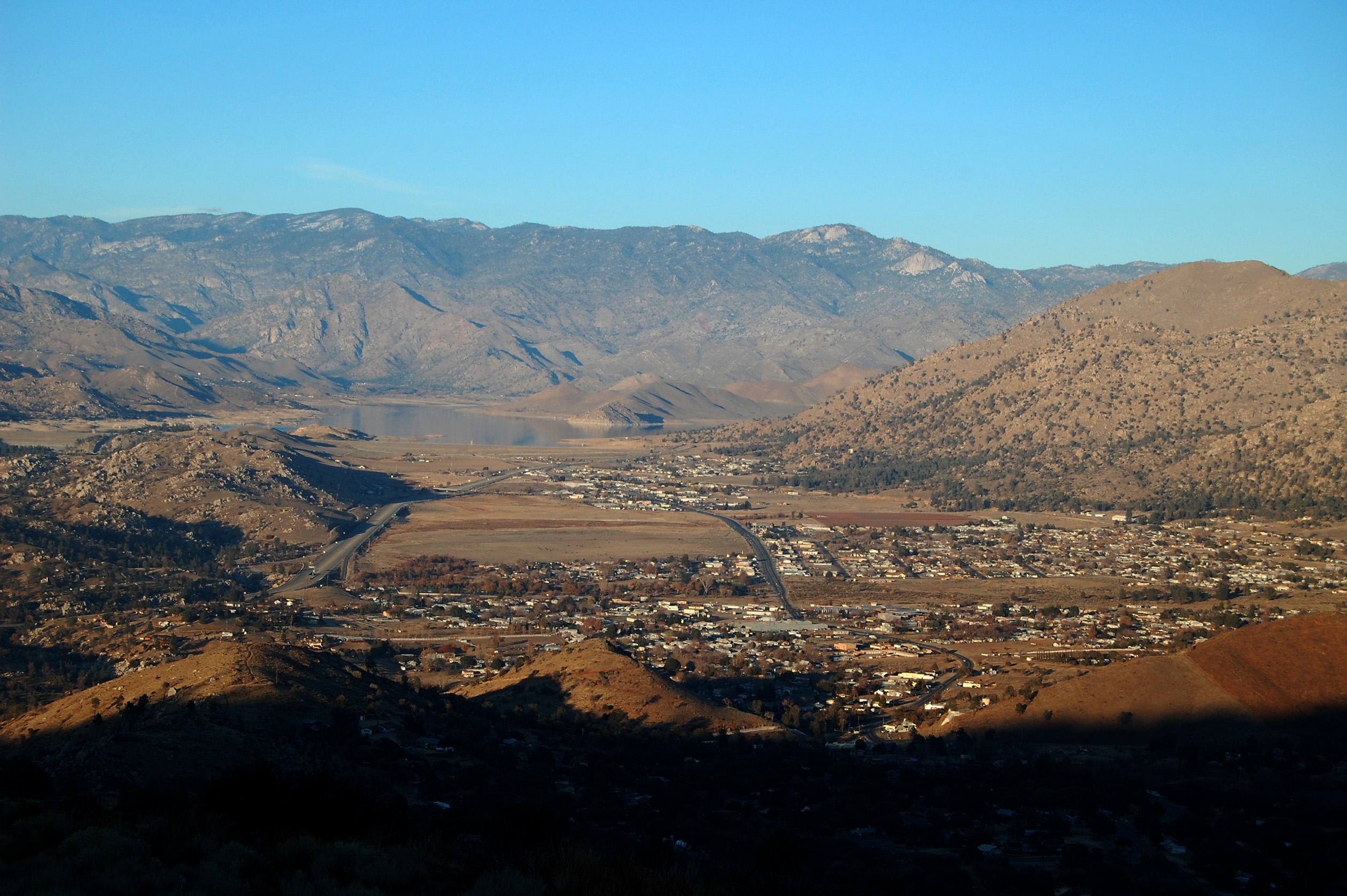
View of Lake Isabella from Caliente-Bodfish Road west of town.

Lake Isabella first appeared as a census designated place in the 1980 United States census.

=== Racial and ethnic composition ===
Lake Isabella CDP, California – Racial and ethnic composition Note: the US Census treats Hispanic/Latino as an ethnic category. This table excludes Latinos from the racial categories and assigns them to a separate category. Hispanics/Latinos may be of any race.
Race / Ethnicity (NH = Non-Hispanic)	Pop 2000	Pop 2010	Pop 2020	% 2000	% 2010	% 2020
White alone (NH)	2,870	2,876	2,640	86.58%	82.98%	73.89%
Black or African American alone (NH)	2	4	21	0.06%	0.12%	0.59%
Native American or Alaska Native alone (NH)	58	75	70	1.75%	2.16%	1.96%
Asian alone (NH)	26	17	36	0.78%	0.49%	1.01%
Native Hawaiian or Pacific Islander alone (NH)	2	7	4	0.06%	0.20%	0.11%
Other race alone (NH)	17	2	13	0.51%	0.06%	0.36%
Mixed race or Multiracial (NH)	116	146	267	3.50%	4.21%	7.47%
Hispanic or Latino (any race)	224	339	522	6.76%	9.78%	14.61%
Total	3,315	3,466	3,573	100.00%	100.00%	100.00%

=== 2020 census ===
As of the 2020 census, Lake Isabella had a population of 3,573. The population density was 164.5 inhabitants per square mile (63.5/km^{2}). The racial makeup of Lake Isabella was 78.8% White, 0.8% African American, 2.8% Native American, 1.0% Asian, 0.1% Pacific Islander, 5.2% from other races, and 11.4% from two or more races. Hispanic or Latino of any race were 14.6% of the population. 88.0% of residents lived in urban areas, while 12.0% lived in rural areas.

The whole population lived in households. There were 1,619 households, out of which 21.4% included children under the age of 18, 29.9% were married-couple households, 9.0% were cohabiting couple households, 32.2% had a female householder with no partner present, and 28.9% had a male householder with no partner present. 41.3% of households were one person, and 21.4% were one person aged 65 or older. The average household size was 2.21. There were 821 families (50.7% of all households).

The age distribution was 21.4% under the age of 18, 6.1% aged 18 to 24, 21.7% aged 25 to 44, 26.5% aged 45 to 64, and 24.3% who were 65 years of age or older. The median age was 45.8 years. For every 100 females, there were 99.8 males. For every 100 females age 18 and over, there were 96.4 males.

There were 2,204 housing units at an average density of 101.5 units per square mile (39.2 units/km^{2}), of which 1,619 (73.5%) were occupied. Of these, 57.5% were owner-occupied, and 42.5% were occupied by renters. 26.5% of housing units were vacant; the homeowner vacancy rate was 6.7% and the rental vacancy rate was 11.5%.

=== Income and poverty ===
In 2023, the US Census Bureau estimated that the median household income was $26,763, and the per capita income was $15,239. About 33.2% of families and 38.6% of the population were below the poverty line.

=== 2010 census ===
At the 2010 census Lake Isabella had a population of 3,466. The population density was 156.6 inhabitants per square mile (60.5/km^{2}). The racial makeup of Lake Isabella was 3,069 (88.5%) White, 6 (0.2%) African American, 96 (2.8%) Native American, 18 (0.5%) Asian, 7 (0.2%) Pacific Islander, 73 (2.1%) from other races, and 197 (5.7%) from two or more races. Hispanic or Latino of any race were 339 people (9.8%).

The whole population lived in households, no one lived in non-institutionalized group quarters and no one was institutionalized.

There were 1,621 households, 384 (23.7%) had children under the age of 18 living in them, 566 (34.9%) were opposite-sex married couples living together, 218 (13.4%) had a female householder with no husband present, 104 (6.4%) had a male householder with no wife present. There were 138 (8.5%) unmarried opposite-sex partnerships, and 14 (0.9%) same-sex married couples or partnerships. 592 households (36.5%) were one person and 299 (18.4%) had someone living alone who was 65 or older. The average household size was 2.14. There were 888 families (54.8% of households); the average family size was 2.76.

The age distribution was 666 people (19.2%) under the age of 18, 299 people (8.6%) aged 18 to 24, 653 people (18.8%) aged 25 to 44, 1,106 people (31.9%) aged 45 to 64, and 742 people (21.4%) who were 65 or older. The median age was 47.2 years. For every 100 females, there were 95.2 males. For every 100 females age 18 and over, there were 91.9 males.

There were 2,164 housing units at an average density of 97.8 per square mile, of the occupied units 1,019 (62.9%) were owner-occupied and 602 (37.1%) were rented. The homeowner vacancy rate was 5.6%; the rental vacancy rate was 8.5%. 2,088 people (60.2% of the population) lived in owner-occupied housing units and 1,378 people (39.8%) lived in rental housing units.
