= Isabella, California =

Isabella
- Former settlement
- Location in California
- Coordinates: 35°39′20″N 118°27′40″W
- Country: United States
- State: California
- County: Kern
- Elevation: 2,516 ft (767 m)

Isabella was a town in Kern County, California, United States. It was located 4.5 miles (7.2 km) north-northeast of Bodfish, at an elevation of 2516 feet (767 m). The site was inundated by Lake Isabella. In 1953, the U.S. Army Corps of Engineers built earthen dams across two forks of the Kern River to create the Isabella reservoir, Kern County's largest body of water year round with a surface area of 11,200 acres.

A post office operated at the original site of Isabella from 1896 to 1953, then at the relocated site from 1953 until the name was changed to Lake Isabella in 1957. The town was founded by Steven Barton in 1893 and named in honor of Queen Isabella of Spain while her name was popular during the 1893 Columbian Exposition.
