= Greenhorn Mountains =

Mountain range of the Southern Sierra Nevada, California

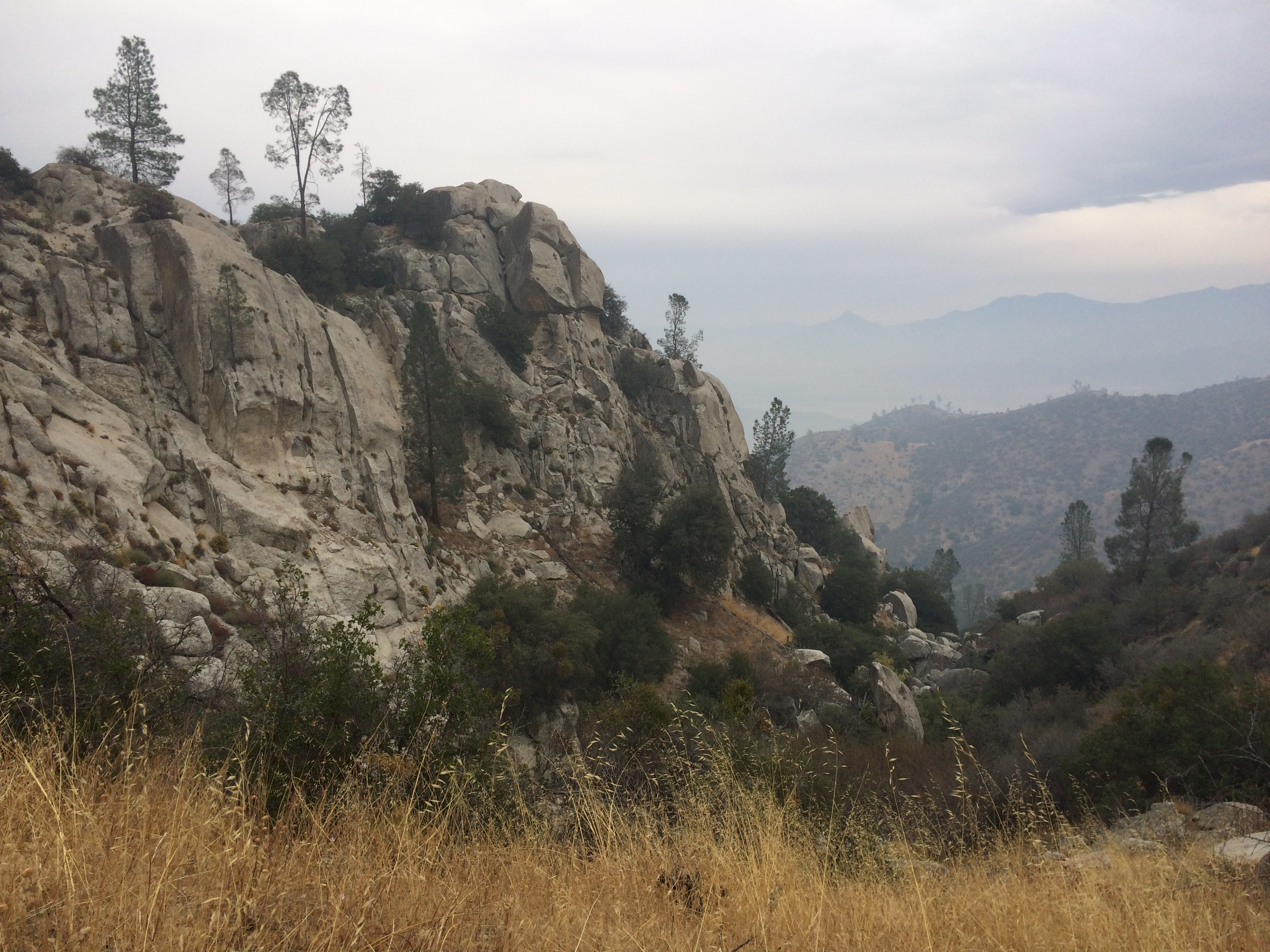
- The Greenhorn Mountains

Highest point
- Elevation: 2,523 m (8,278 ft)

Geography
- Location within California
- Country: United States
- State: California
- District(s): Kern County, Tulare County
- Range coordinates: 35°50′59.820″N 118°34′21.315″W
- Topo map: USGS Tobias Peak

The Greenhorn Mountains are a mountain range of the Southern Sierra Nevada, in California. They are protected within the Sequoia National Forest.

== Geography ==
The range is located in eastern Kern County and Tulare County. They are east of the San Joaquin Valley, northeast of Bakersfield, and form the west side of the Kern River Valley.

The range reaches an elevation of 8,295 feet (2,528 m) at Sunday Peak, located just south of Portuguese Pass.

The lower Kern Canyon is a dramatic and deep canyon cut by the Kern River through the Greenhorn Mountains to the San Joaquin Valley. State Route 178 follows the canyon up to the Kern River Valley.

During the Gold Strike of 1854 miners crossing the Greenhorn Mountains founded the town of Keyesville.

== Ecology ==
The Greenhorn Mountains contain a variety of native California flora and fauna. One wildflower found here is the Yellow mariposa lily (Calochortus luteus), which is at the extreme southern end of its distribution range. The Marsh checkerbloom (Sidalcea ranunculacea) is endemic to the range and adjacent Sierra Nevada foothills.

The Greenhorn Mountains slender salamander (Batrachoseps altasierrae) is endemic to the Greenhorn Mountains.

== See also ==
- Kern River Canyon — upper section.
