= Lake Isabella =

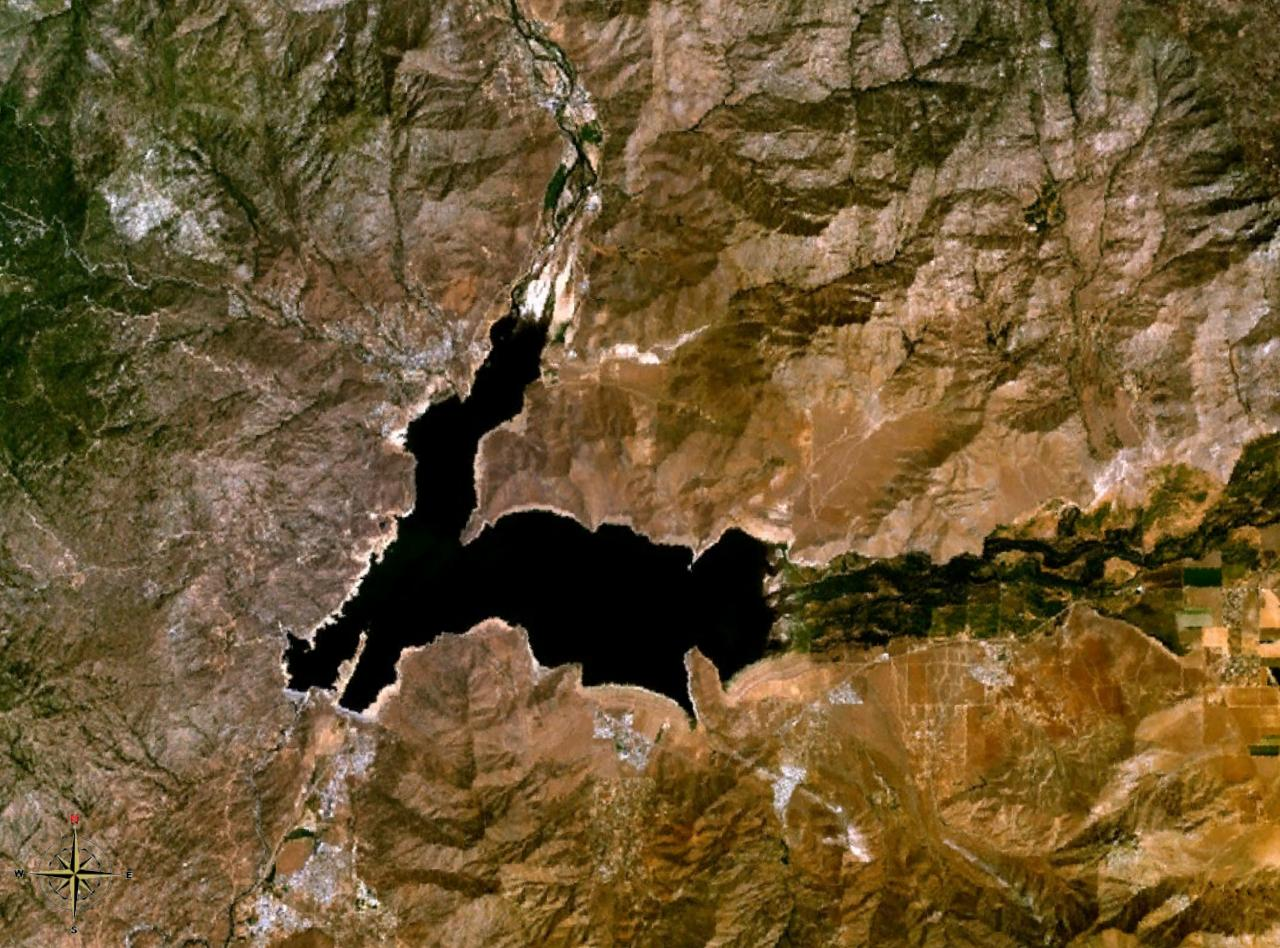
- Satellite image of Lake Isabella (between 1999-2006)

- Location within California Location within the United States
- Location: Kern County, California, United States
- Coordinates: 35°40′17.69″N 118°25′38.05″W
- Lake type: reservoir
- Primary inflows: Upper Kern River, South Fork Kern River
- Primary outflows: Lower Kern River
- Basin countries: United States
- Surface area: 11,000 acres (4,500 ha)
- Water volume: 568,000 acre-feet (701,000 dam^{3})
- Surface elevation: 2,500 ft (760 m)

Lake Isabella also called Isabella Lake, is a reservoir in Kern County, California, United States created by the earthen Isabella Dam. At 11,000 acres (4,500 ha), it is one of the larger reservoirs in California. Lake Isabella is located about 40 miles (64 km) northeast of Bakersfield. It was formed in 1953 when the U.S. Army Corps of Engineers dammed the Kern River at the junction of its two forks. The area is in the southern end of the Sierra Nevada range and the lake itself is located in low mountains at an elevation of approximately 2,500 ft (760 m) where summer temperatures reach over 100 °F (38 °C) but low enough to avoid winter snows on the surrounding ridges. The former towns of Isabella and Kernville were flooded when the reservoir was created.

== Capacity ==
The U.S. Army Corps of Engineers operates and has jurisdiction over the main and auxiliary dams. In 2006, Isabella Dam was found to be too unstable to hold a full amount of water and approximately 37% of a full reservoir had to be let out to restabilize the earth works. The U.S. Army Corps of Engineers did not let the water get above 63% of capacity until an estimated 10–15 years of studies and repairs were made. The Isabella Dam bisects an active fault that could lead to a catastrophic failure if an earthquake occurs along it. This fault was considered inactive when the site was studied in the late 1940s. The project to retrofit the dam was substantially completed in 2022.

On February 3, 2023, the Army Corps of Engineers requested a deviation from the operating pool restriction of 361,000 acre-feet (445,000 dam^{3}) of water. If approved, Lake Isabella will be allowed to fill to its full capacity of 568,000 acre-feet (701,000 dam^{3}) for the first time in nearly 15 years.

== Recreation ==
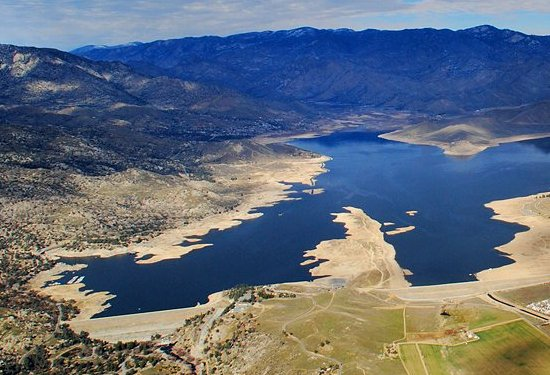
Aerial view of Lake Isabella in 2009

Kern County Parks maintains law enforcement and rescue responsibilities on the lake. Several recreation areas are located around the lake as a part of the Sequoia National Forest. The U.S. Forest Service oversees the majority of the land that touches the shore including boat ramps, campgrounds, roadways, and leases to private vendors providing services. The nearby towns of Lake Isabella and Kernville receive economic benefit from tourism created by the Lake Isabella Recreation Area and the whitewater rafting attraction of the Upper and Lower Kern River. Lake Isabella can be reached by car from Bakersfield via state Highway 178 and from Delano via Highway 155.

== See also ==
- List of dams and reservoirs in California
- List of lakes in California
- List of largest reservoirs of California
- Erskine Fire
