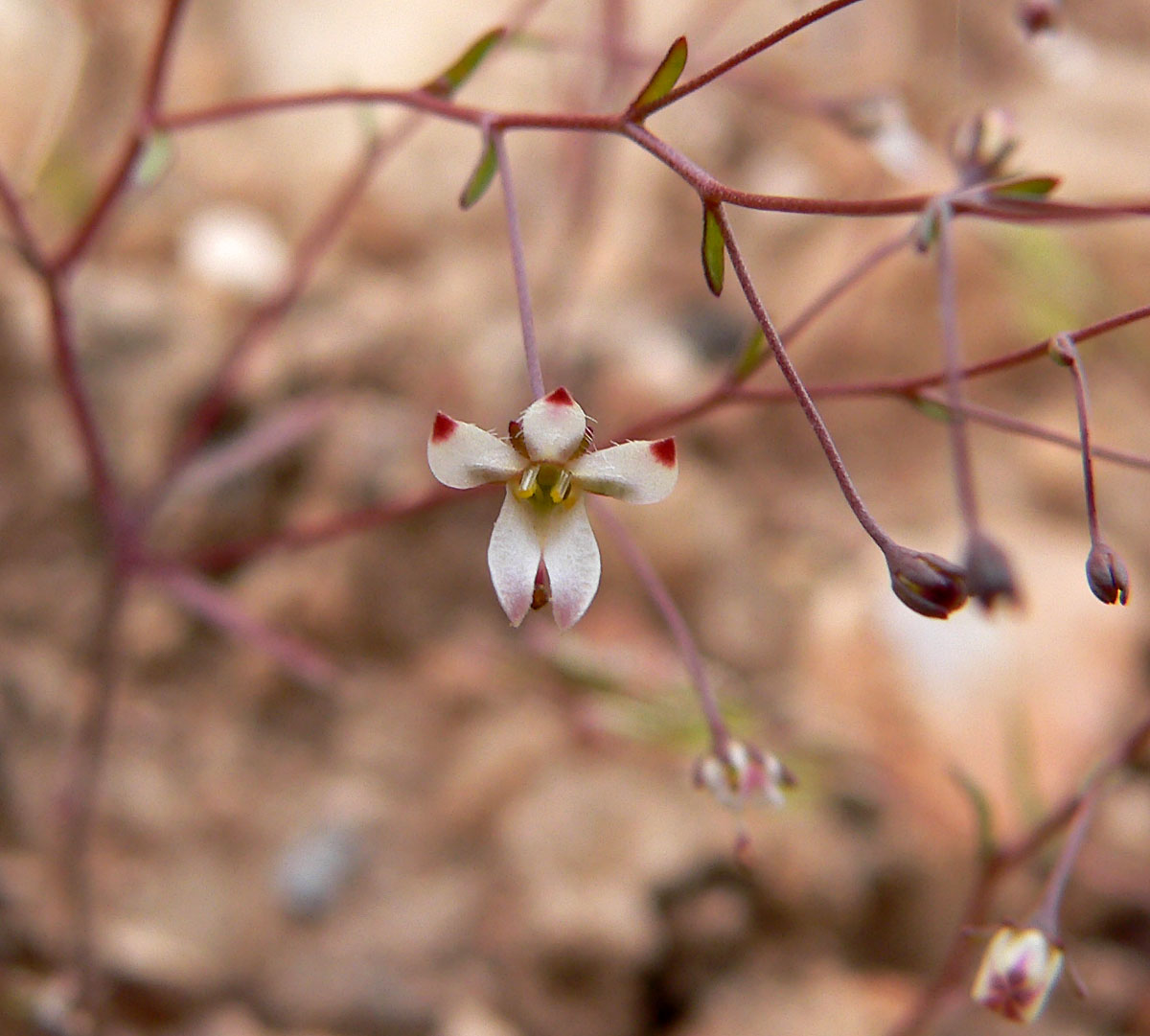
- Nemacladus orientalis

Scientific classification
- Kingdom: Plantae
- Clade: Tracheophytes
- Clade: Angiosperms
- Clade: Eudicots
- Clade: Asterids
- Order: Asterales
- Family: Campanulaceae
- Subfamily: Nemacladoideae
- Genus: Nemacladus; Nutt.

Synonyms
- Parishella A.Gray

= Nemacladus =

Genus of flowering plants

Nemacladus is a genus of flowering plants in the bellflower family known generally as threadplants. Species are native to the southwestern United States and northern Mexico. These are annual herbs with very slender, sometimes threadlike, branching stems bearing small five-lobed flowers.

== Taxonomy ==
The genus was erected by Thomas Nuttall in 1842. It is placed in the small subfamily Nemacladoideae of the family Campanulaceae.

=== Species ===
As of April 2022, Plants of the World Online accepted the following species:

- Nemacladus australis (Munz) Morin - Baja California
- Nemacladus bellus Morin & T.J.Ayers
- Nemacladus breviflorus (McVaugh) Morin & T.J.Ayers
- Nemacladus calcaratus Morin - Chimney Creek threadplant - California (Inyo + Tulare Cos)
- Nemacladus californicus (A.Gray) Morin - California (San Bernardino, Kern, Ventura, Santa Barbara, San Luis Obispo Cos)
- Nemacladus capillaris Greene - much of California, southwestern Oregon
- Nemacladus eastwoodiae Morin & T.J.Ayers
- Nemacladus glanduliferus Jeps. - glandular threadplant - Arizona, southern California, Baja California
- Nemacladus gracilis Eastw. - slender threadplant - California (San Joaquin Valley, Los Angeles Basin)
- Nemacladus interior (Munz) G.T.Robbins - Sierra threadplant - California, Oregon
- Nemacladus inyoensis Morin & T.J.Ayers
- Nemacladus longiflorus A.Gray - California, Arizona, Utah, Baja California
- Nemacladus matsonii Morin & T.J.Ayers
- Nemacladus montanus Greene - northern California
- Nemacladus morefieldii Morin & T.J.Ayers
- Nemacladus orientalis (McVaugh) Morin - Sonora, Baja California, California, Arizona, Nevada, Utah, southern New Mexico, extreme western Texas
- Nemacladus parikhiae Morin & T.J.Ayers
- Nemacladus pinnatifidus Greene - Baja California, southern California
- Nemacladus ramosissimus Nutt. - smallflower threadplant - Baja California, southern California
- Nemacladus richardsiae Morin & T.J.Ayers
- Nemacladus rigidus Curran - stoutstem threadplant - California, Nevada, southeastern Oregon, southwestern Idaho
- Nemacladus rubescens Greene - California, Nevada, western Arizona, southwestern Utah
- Nemacladus secundiflorus G.T.Robbins - California
- Nemacladus sigmoideus G.T.Robbins - sigmoid threadplant - California, Nevada, western Arizona
- Nemacladus tenuis (McVaugh) Morin - California, Baja California
- Nemacladus twisselmannii J.T.Howell - California (Kern Co.)
