= Nemacladus gracilis =

Scientific classification
- Kingdom: Plantae
- Clade: Tracheophytes
- Clade: Angiosperms
- Clade: Eudicots
- Clade: Asterids
- Order: Asterales
- Family: Campanulaceae
- Genus: Nemacladus
- Species: N. gracilis

Binomial name
- Nemacladus gracilis Eastw.

Species of flowering plant

Nemacladus gracilis is an uncommon species of flowering plant in the bellflower family known by the common names slender threadplant or slender nemacladus. It is endemic to California, where it is known from the Transverse Ranges and adjacent mountains, desert, and valley territory. It can be found in rocky and sandy areas in woodland and grassland habitat. It is a small annual herb producing an upright reddish brown stem no more than about 10 centimeters long. Small lobed oval leaves under a centimeter long occur at the base of the plant. The inflorescence is a series of branches bearing occasional flowers on thin, curving pedicels. There is a single tiny bract at the base of each pedicel. The flower is only about 2 millimeters long. It has five lavender-veined white lobes fused along the lower half.
