= Nemacladus ramosissimus =

Scientific classification
- Kingdom: Plantae
- Clade: Tracheophytes
- Clade: Angiosperms
- Clade: Eudicots
- Clade: Asterids
- Order: Asterales
- Family: Campanulaceae
- Genus: Nemacladus
- Species: N. ramosissimus

Binomial name
- Nemacladus ramosissimus Nutt.

Species of flowering plant

Nemacladus ramosissimus is a species of flowering plant in the bellflower family known by the common name smallflower threadplant. It is native to the mountains and deserts of the southern half of California and adjacent parts of Baja California. It is a small annual herb producing a thread-thin erect brown or purplish stem up to about 32 centimeters tall. Lobed oval leaves under 2 centimeters long occur at the base of the plant. The inflorescence is a series of branches bearing occasional flowers on thin, curving pedicels. There is a single small bract at the base of each pedicel. The flower is no more than 2 millimeters long with five white lobes fused along the lower half.
