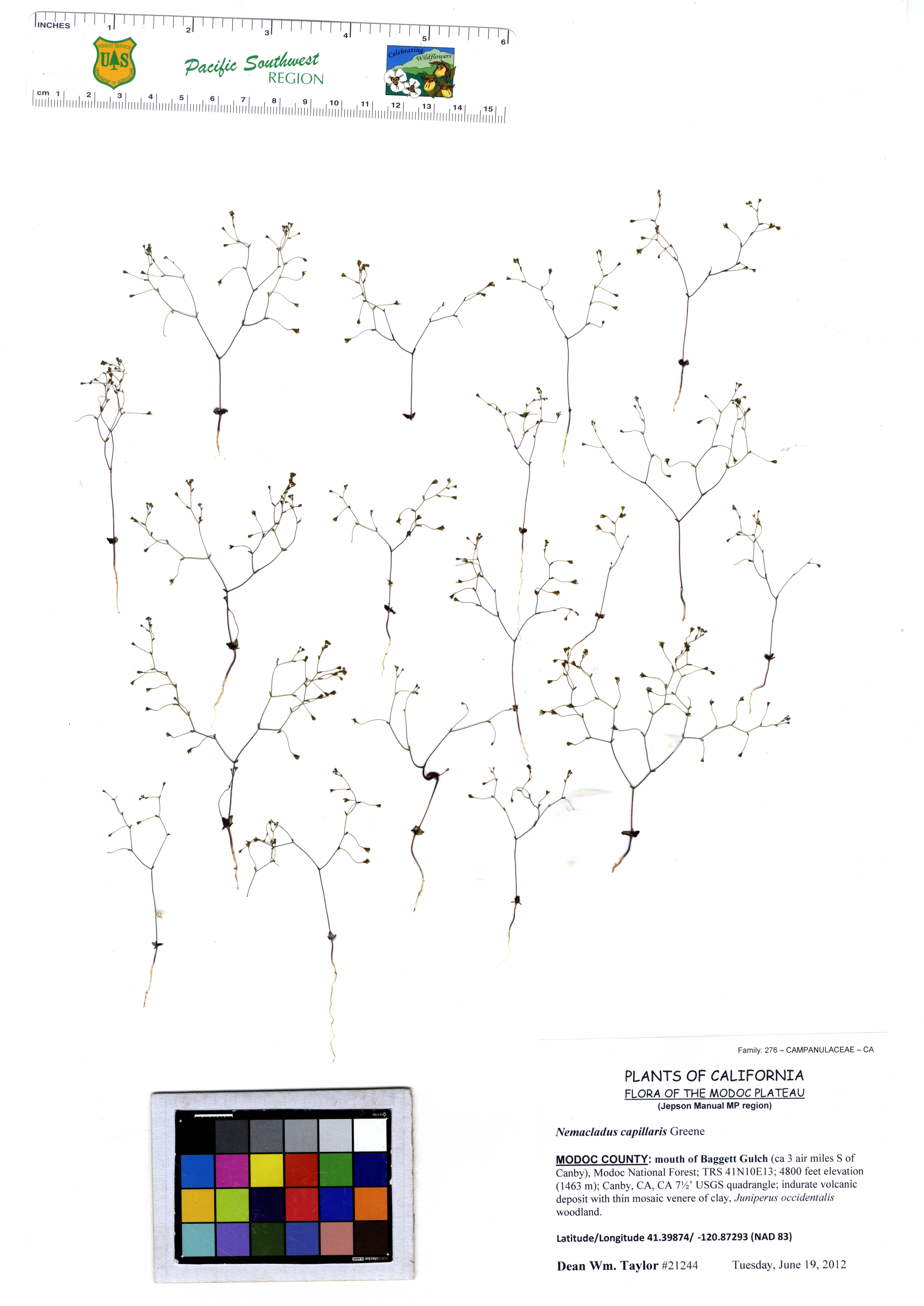
- Herbarium specimens

Scientific classification
- Kingdom: Plantae
- Clade: Tracheophytes
- Clade: Angiosperms
- Clade: Eudicots
- Clade: Asterids
- Order: Asterales
- Family: Campanulaceae
- Genus: Nemacladus
- Species: N. capillaris

Binomial name
- Nemacladus capillaris Greene

= Nemacladus capillaris =

Species of flowering plant

Nemacladus capillaris (common name common threadplant or common nemacladus) is an annual plant in the family Campanulaceae, native to foothills of the Sierra Nevada and Coast Ranges of California and southern Oregon at altitudes of 400–2100 m. It grows to 7–18 cm (2.8–7.1 in) tall, with slender shoots. It has very small white pentamerous flowers, 1.3 mm (0.1 in) long, and flowers from May to July.
