= Nemacladus glanduliferus =

Scientific classification
- Kingdom: Plantae
- Clade: Tracheophytes
- Clade: Angiosperms
- Clade: Eudicots
- Clade: Asterids
- Order: Asterales
- Family: Campanulaceae
- Genus: Nemacladus
- Species: N. glanduliferus

Binomial name
- Nemacladus glanduliferus Jeps.

Species of flowering plant

Nemacladus glanduliferus is a species of flowering plant in the bellflower family known by the common name glandular threadplant. It is native to the southwestern United States and Baja California, where it grows in desert and plateau habitat. It is an annual herb producing a purplish or brownish green, branching stem up to about 25 centimeters tall. Small oval leaves occur at the base of the plant. The inflorescence is a series of zigzagging branches bearing occasional flowers on thin, erect pedicels. There is a single small bract at the base of each pedicel. The flower at the curved tip of the pedicel is just a few millimeters wide. There are five pointed sepals and five white corolla lobes, generally three in the upper lip and two in the lower.
