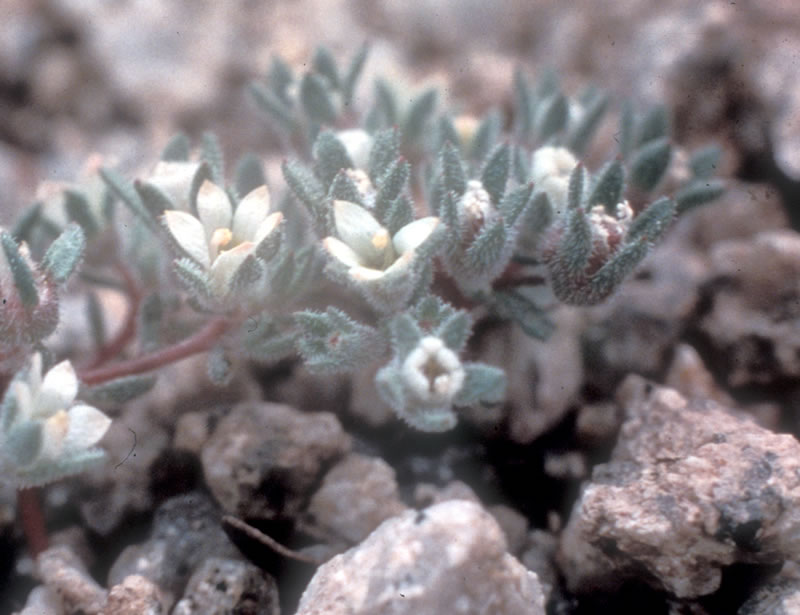

Conservation status
- Critically Imperiled (NatureServe)

Scientific classification
- Kingdom: Plantae
- Clade: Tracheophytes
- Clade: Angiosperms
- Clade: Eudicots
- Clade: Asterids
- Order: Asterales
- Family: Campanulaceae
- Genus: Nemacladus
- Species: N. twisselmannii

Binomial name
- Nemacladus twisselmannii J.T.Howell

= Nemacladus twisselmannii =

Species of flowering plant

Nemacladus twisselmannii is a rare species of flowering plant in the bellflower family known by the common names Twisselmann's threadplant and Twisselmann's nemacladus. It is endemic to California, where it is known only from two locations in the Sierra Nevada. There is one occurrence each in Kern and Tulare Counties.

This is a small annual herb forming cushions of foliage at ground level, the stems no more than a centimeter long. The hairy, spoon-shaped leaves are 2 to 3 millimeters long. The inflorescence is a headlike cluster of flowers on hairlike pedicels. The flower has hairy sepals one millimeter long and a white corolla up to 3 millimeters long. The fruit is a tiny capsule with a rounded end and a pointed tip.

The plant grows in coniferous forest with granite rock and sand at over 7000 feet in elevation. There are two known populations, each containing about 400 plants. They are located in remote wilderness in the Sequoia National Forest.

The plant is named for Central Valley cattle rancher and botanist Ernest Christian Twisselmann.
