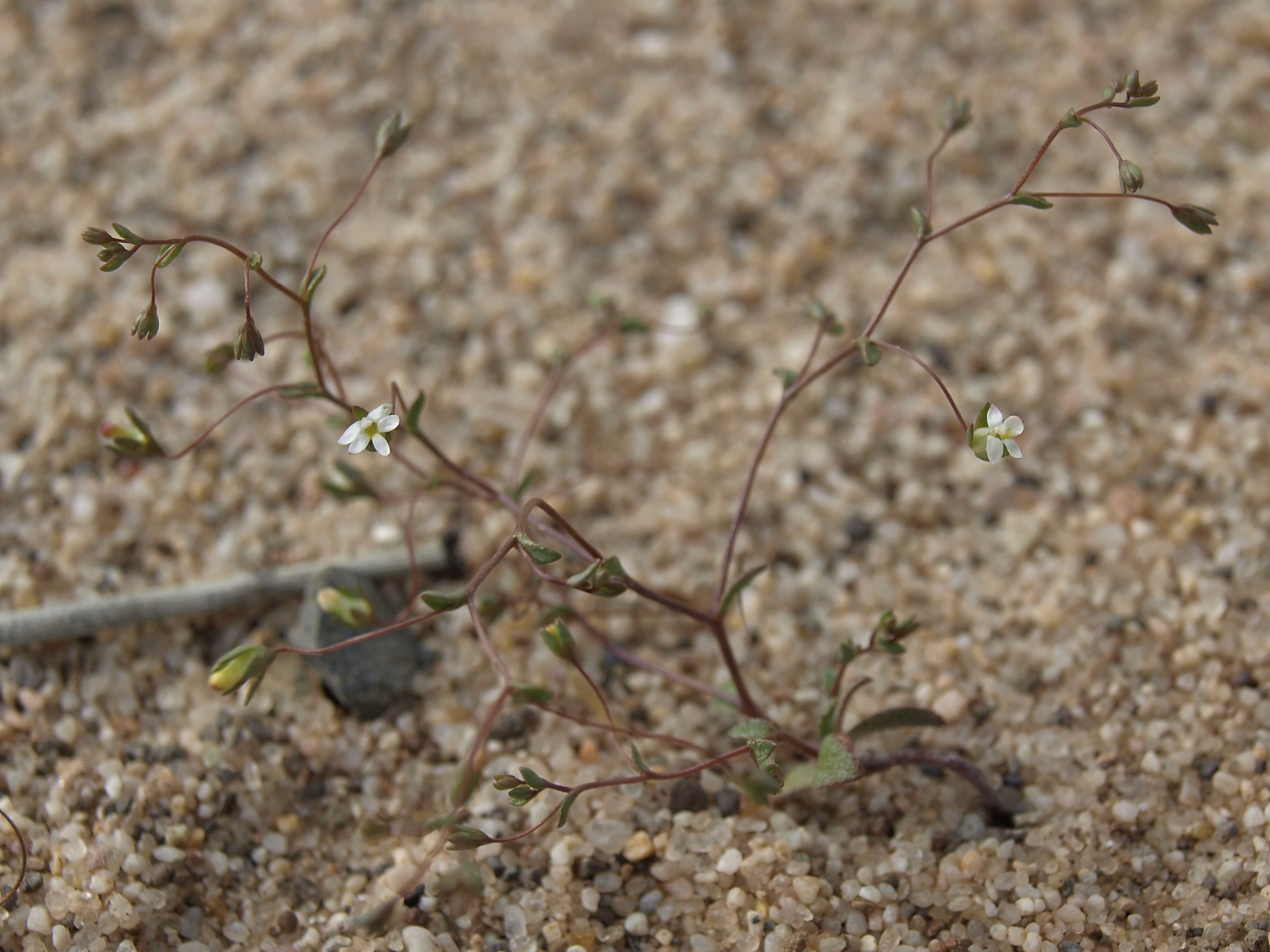

Scientific classification
- Kingdom: Plantae
- Clade: Tracheophytes
- Clade: Angiosperms
- Clade: Eudicots
- Clade: Asterids
- Order: Asterales
- Family: Campanulaceae
- Genus: Nemacladus
- Species: N. sigmoideus

Binomial name
- Nemacladus sigmoideus G.T.Robbins

= Nemacladus sigmoideus =

Species of flowering plant

Nemacladus sigmoideus is a species of flowering plant in the bellflower family known by the common name sigmoid threadplant. It is native to the mountains and deserts around the intersection of California, Nevada, Arizona, and Baja California. It is a small annual herb producing a thin, spreading purplish or brown stem no more than 12 centimeters long. Hairy, sometimes toothed oval leaves up to a centimeter long occur at the base of the plant. The inflorescence is a series of zigzagging branches bearing flowers on thin pedicels which are sigmoid in shape. There is a single tiny bract at the base of each pedicel. The hairy flower is under 4 millimeters long. It has five yellow-tipped white lobes.
