= Nemacladus interior =

Scientific classification
- Kingdom: Plantae
- Clade: Tracheophytes
- Clade: Angiosperms
- Clade: Eudicots
- Clade: Asterids
- Order: Asterales
- Family: Campanulaceae
- Genus: Nemacladus
- Species: N. interior

Binomial name
- Nemacladus interior (Munz) G.T.Robbins

Species of flowering plant

Nemacladus interior is a species of flowering plant in the bellflower family known by the common name Sierra threadplant. It is native to the Sierra Nevada of California, and it is known from Oregon as well. It grows in mountain forest habitat. It is an annual herb producing a stiff upright purple-brown stem up to about 25 centimeters tall. Small toothed oval leaves 1 to 2 centimeters long occur at the base of the plant. The inflorescence is a zigzagging series of branches bearing occasional flowers on thin pedicels. There is a single tiny bract at the base of each pedicel. The flower is a few millimeters long. It has five triangular sepals and five corolla lobes, three lobes on the upper lip and two on the lower. The corolla is white to pale purple or pink with a thin red band and yellow spot at the base of each lobe.
