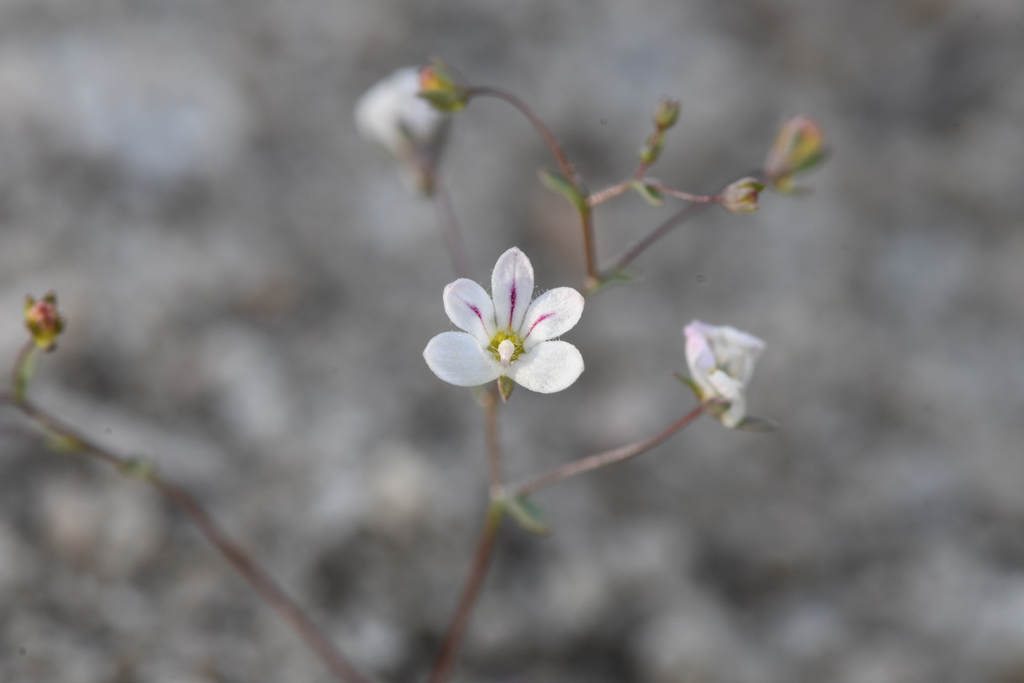
- Nemacladus calcaratus in flower

Conservation status
- Critically Imperiled (NatureServe)

Scientific classification
- Kingdom: Plantae
- Clade: Embryophytes
- Clade: Tracheophytes
- Clade: Spermatophytes
- Clade: Angiosperms
- Clade: Eudicots
- Clade: Asterids
- Order: Asterales
- Family: Campanulaceae
- Genus: Nemacladus
- Species: N. calcaratus

Binomial name
- Nemacladus calcaratus Morin

= Nemacladus calcaratus =

Species of flowering plant

Nemacladus calcaratus is a rare species of flowering plant in the bellflower family known by the common name Chimney Creek nemacladus. It is endemic to Tulare County, California, where it is known only from Chimney Creek in the southern Sierra Nevada east of Lake Isabella. It occurs in woodland habitat on sandy granitic substrate. It was first collected in 1986 and described to science as a new species in 2008.

This is a petite annual herb with an angular, slightly hairy, sometimes red-tinged stem just a few centimeters long. The lance-shaped leaves are just a few millimeters long, green to red in color, and densely hairy. The inflorescence bears flowers on short, threadlike pedicels about a centimeter long. The tiny flower has five pointed lobes each 1 or 2 millimeters long, the two lowest fused to form a spur. The flower is white with dark red stripes in the throat.
