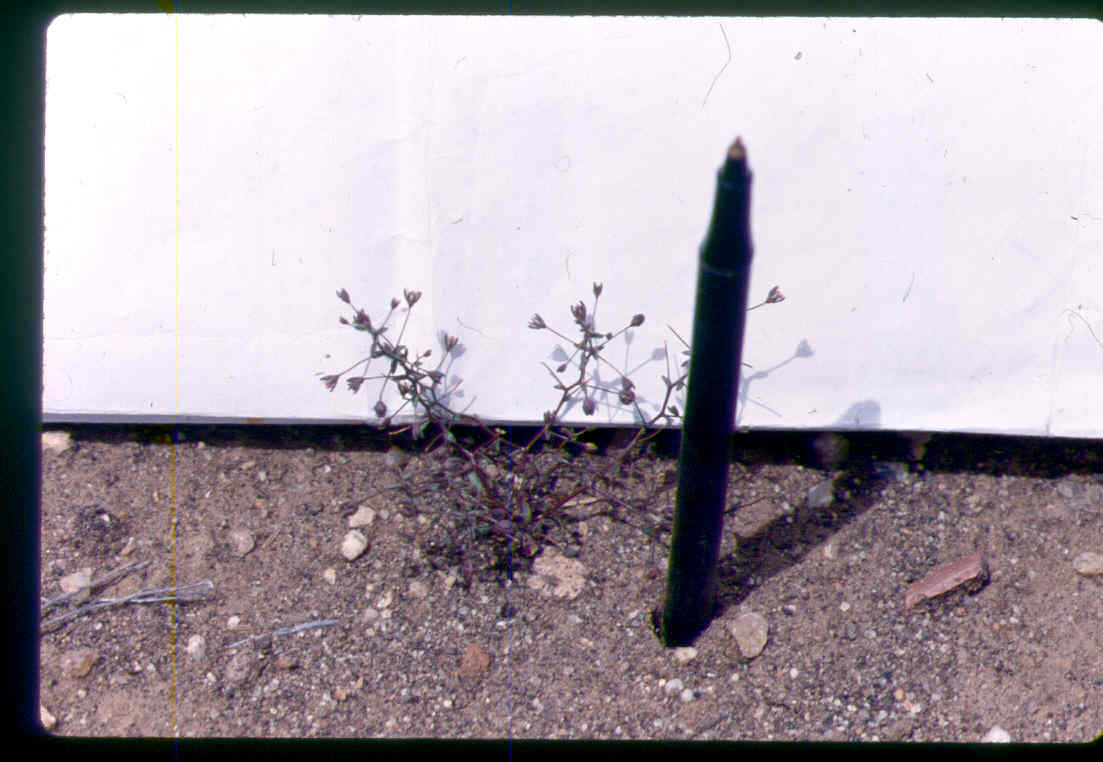

Scientific classification
- Kingdom: Plantae
- Clade: Tracheophytes
- Clade: Angiosperms
- Clade: Eudicots
- Clade: Asterids
- Order: Asterales
- Family: Campanulaceae
- Genus: Nemacladus
- Species: N. rigidus

Binomial name
- Nemacladus rigidus Curran

= Nemacladus rigidus =

Species of flowering plant

Nemacladus rigidus is a species of flowering plant in the bellflower family known by the common name stoutstem threadplant. It is native to the Great Basin in the United States, where it grows in open areas, often on bare soil. It is a small annual herb producing a thin, spreading purplish stem no more than 9 centimeters long. Oval leaves up to a centimeter long occur at the base of the plant. The inflorescence is a series of zigzagging branches bearing flowers on thin, curving pedicels. There is a single tiny bract at the base of each pedicel. The flower is under 2 millimeters long. It has five red-veined white or purple-tinged lobes.
