= Cancer Survivors Park =

Richard Bloch Foundation parks

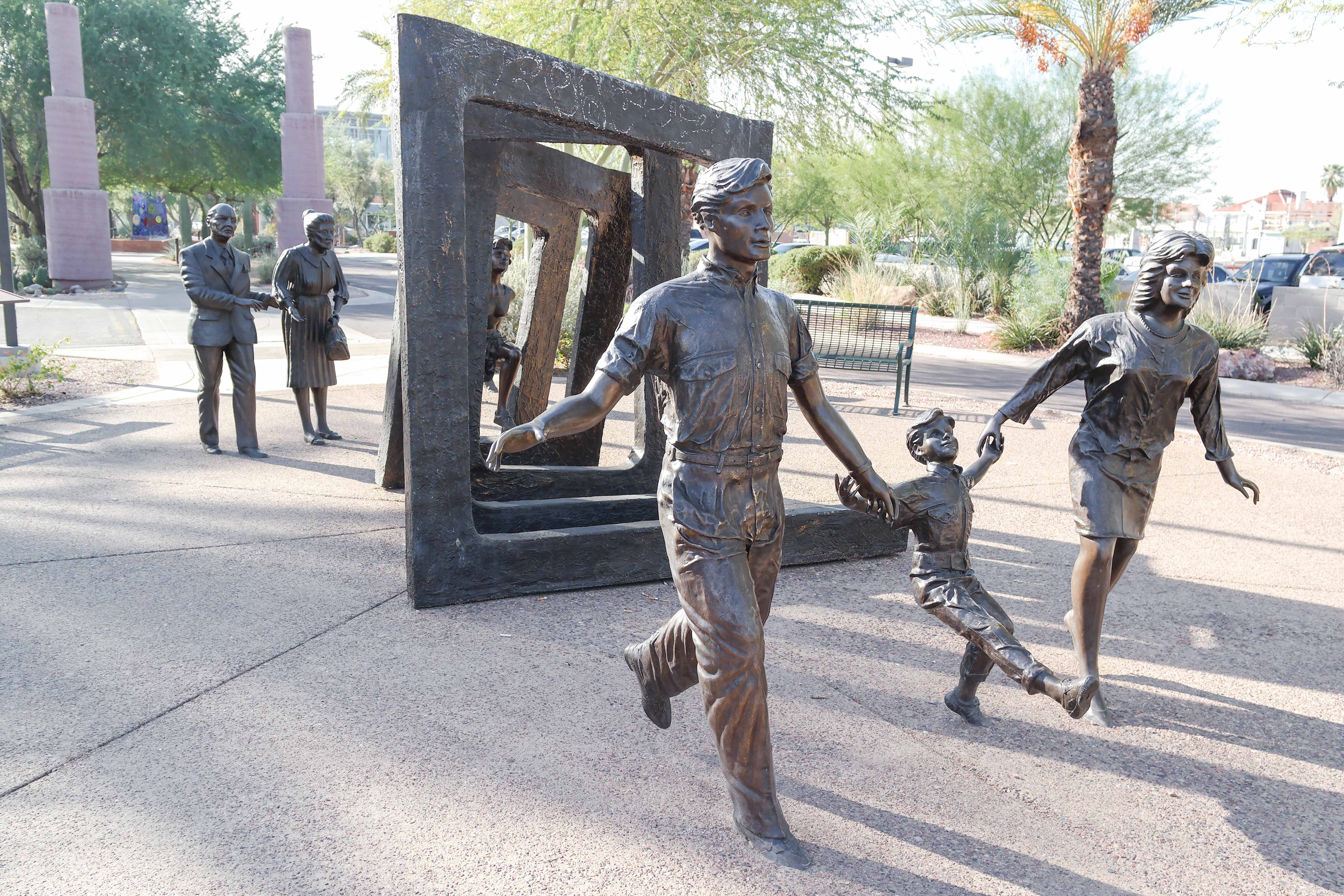
Cancer, There is Hope sculpture by Victor Salmones, in Phoenix, 2013

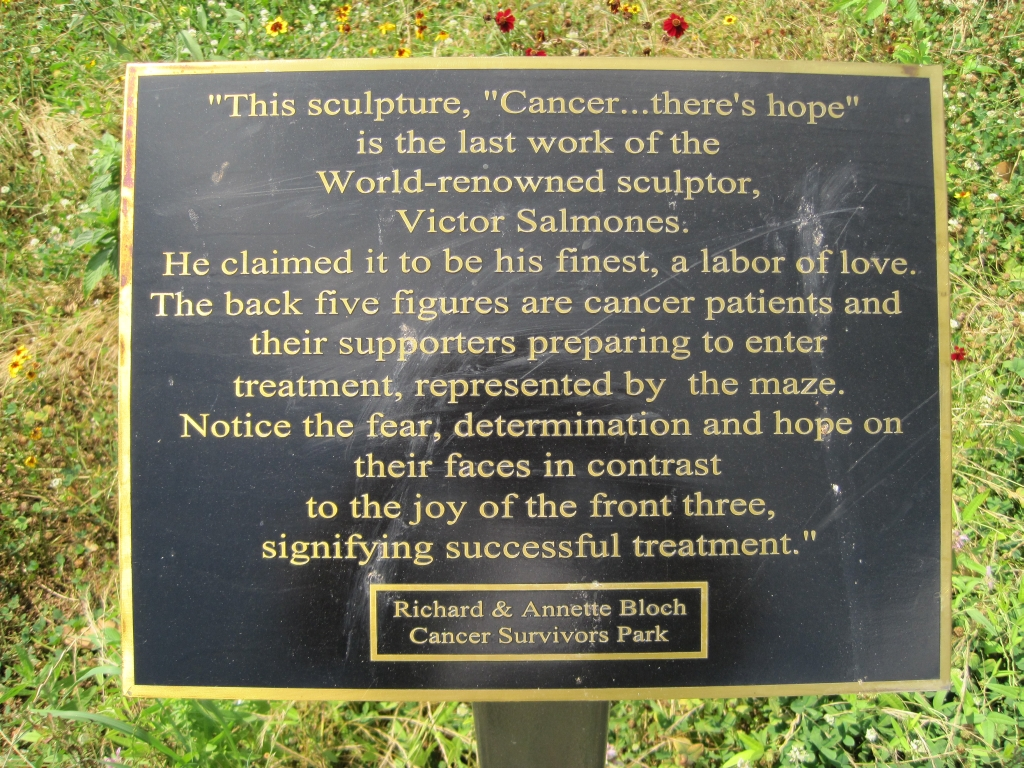
Sculpture plaque in Memphis, Tennessee

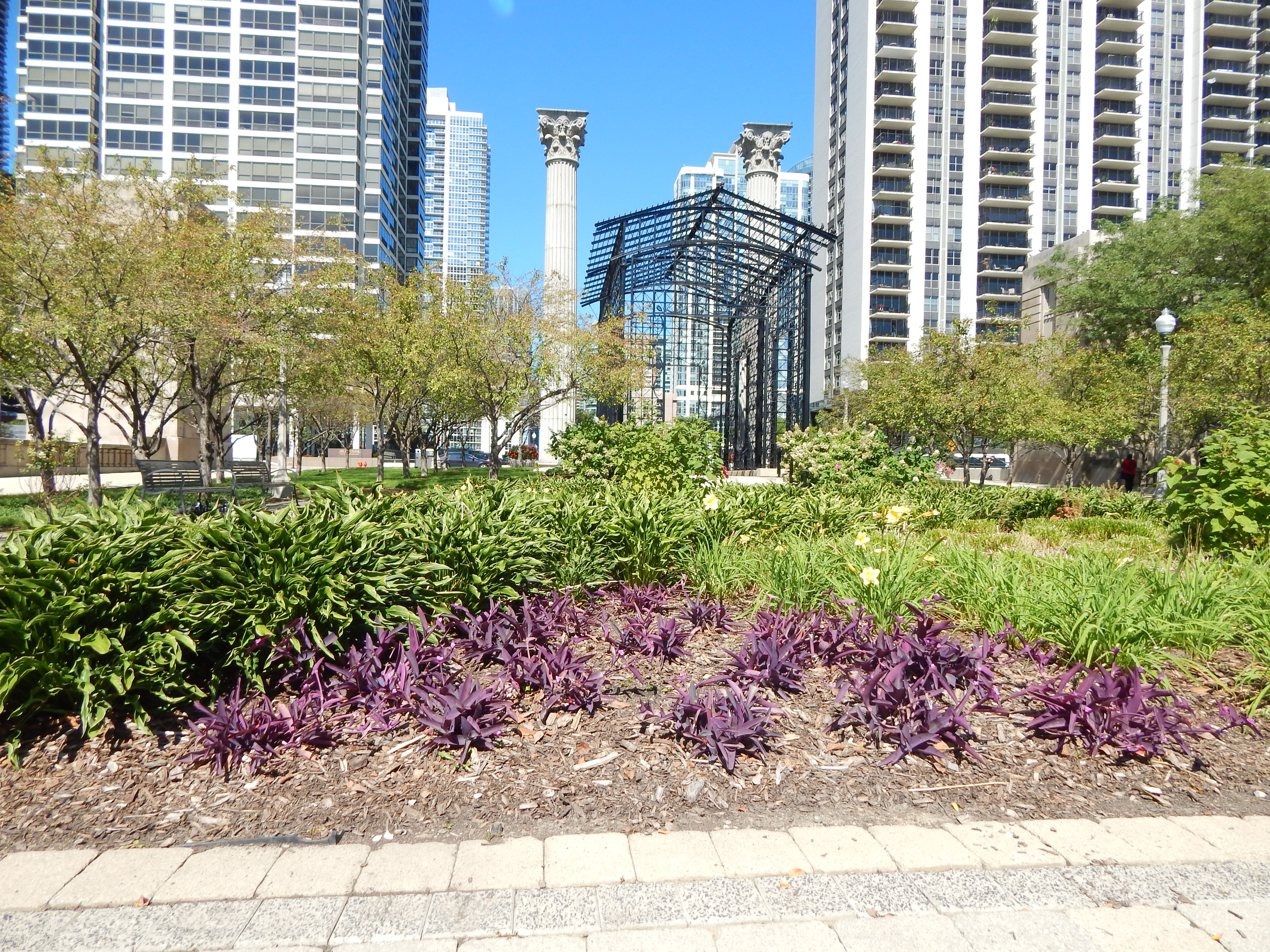
Open pavilion in Chicago, Illinois

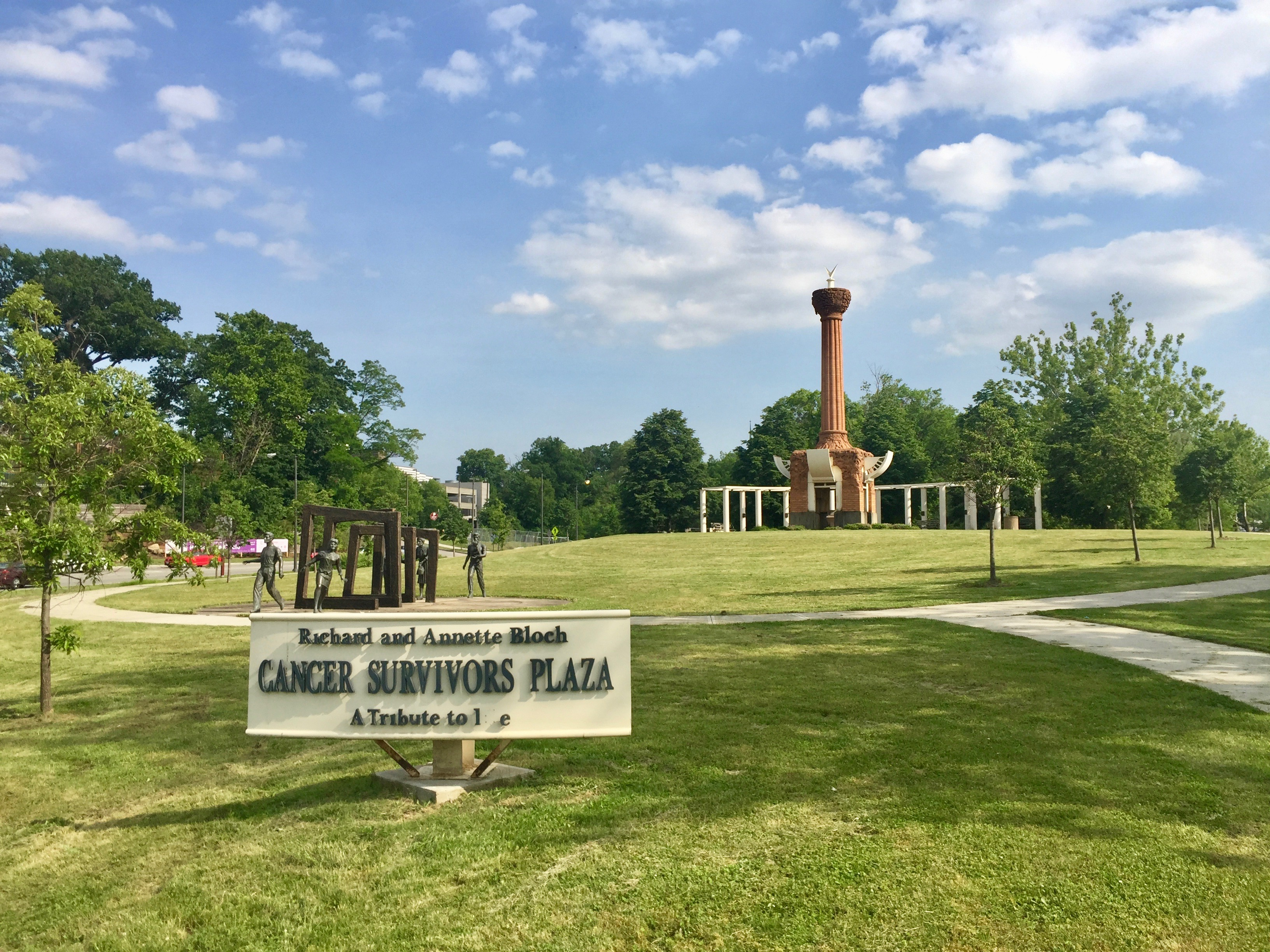
Plaza in Cleveland, Ohio

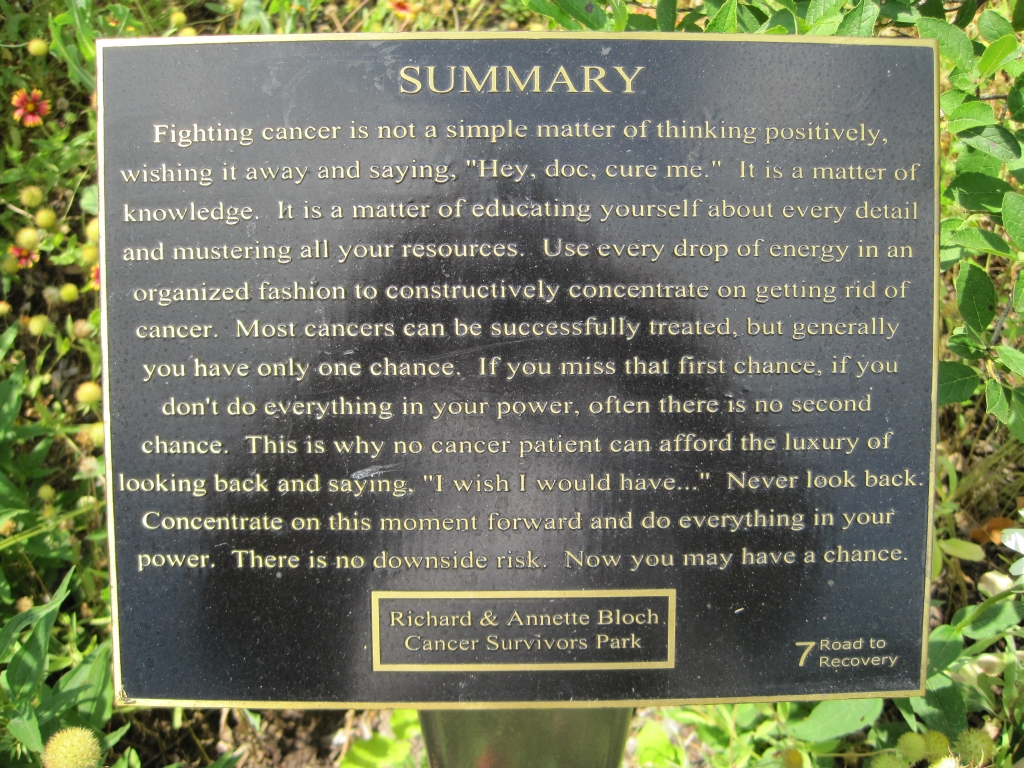
Final plaque on the "Road to Recovery" path, in Memphis

Cancer Survivors Park refers to a series of parks funded by the Bloch Foundation. Twenty-five parks were built across the US and Canada. They are all different but designed with the same elements:

- A walk with bronze plaques containing inspirational and instructional information
- The Cancer, There Is Hope sculpture of eight people passing through a maze that represents cancer treatment
- A walk with bronze plaques containing information about cancer and basic actions to overcome it

The park program was founded by Richard Bloch (co-founder of H&R Block) and his wife Annette Block, after Richard survived lung cancer. The parks were part of a larger program supporting cancer research and patient education.

Park Name	Location	Status
Cancer Survivors Plaza, at Beach Park	Bakersfield, California	Sculpture figures stolen
Richard and Annette Bloch Cancer Survivor Plaza, at Julia Davis Park	Boise, Idaho	Intact; includes a kinetic wind sculpture instead of the Salmones sculpture
Richard and Annette Bloch Cancer Survivors Garden, now part of Maggie Daley Park	Chicago, Illinois	Intact; includes an open pavilion instead of the Salmones sculpture
Bloch Cancer Survivors' Plaza, at Celebration Plaza	Cleveland, Ohio	Some sculpture figures missing
RA Bloch Cancer Survivors Garden and Labyrinth, in Maxcy Gregg Park	Columbia, South Carolina	Intact
Bloch Cancer Survivors Plaza, part of Chadwick Arboretum	Columbus, Ohio	Intact
Cancer Survivors Plaza, at Celebration of Life Park	Dallas, Texas	Some sculpture figures missing
The Richard and Annette Bloch Cancer Survivors Plaza, at Hermann Park	Houston, Texas	Some sculpture figures vandalized and removed
Cancer Survivors Park	Indianapolis, Indiana	Demolished (1995–2017)
Richard and Annette Bloch Cancer Survivors Park, on the downtown campus of Florida State College at Jacksonville	Jacksonville, Florida	Intact
Bloch Cancer Survivors Park	Kansas City, Missouri	Intact, and revitalized to include the Transformed Flower sculpture
Richard & Annette Bloch Cancer Survivors Park, in Memphis Botanic Garden	Memphis, Tennessee	Intact
Richard and Annette Bloch Cancer Survivors Park, at Marquette Plaza	Minneapolis, Minnesota	Intact
Richard and Annette Bloch Cancer Survivor Park, at Credit Valley Hospital	Mississauga, Ontario, Canada	Intact
Richard and Annette Bloch Cancer Survivors Plaza, in the Central Business District	New Orleans, Louisiana	Intact
Cancer Survivors Park	Omaha, Nebraska	Intact
Richard and Annette Bloch Cancer Survivors Park	Ottawa, Ontario, Canada	Intact
Cancer Survivors Park	Phoenix, Arizona	Intact
Bloch Cancer Survivors Park	Rancho Mirage, California	Intact
Richard and Annette Bloch Cancer Survivors Park, at UC Davis Medical Center	Sacramento, California	Intact
Cancer Survivors Park at Spanish Landing Park	San Diego, California	Intact
Cancer Survivors Plaza, at Fremont Neighborhood Park	Santa Rosa, California	Intact; neighborhood park renovation planned
Cancer Survivors Plaza, at Al Lopez Park	Tampa, Florida	Intact
Cancer Survivors Park	Towson, Maryland	Intact
Cancer Survivors Plaza, at Gene C. Reid Park	Tucson, Arizona	Intact
