= The Park at River Walk =

Park in Bakersfield, California

- Interactive map of The Park at River Walk
- Type: Public Park
- Location: Bakersfield, CA
- Coordinates: 35°21′04″N 119°07′37″W
- Area: 32 acres (130,000 m^{2})
- Created: 2006
- Operator: Bakersfield Department of Recreation and Parks
- Status: Open all year

The Park at River Walk (also known as "River Walk Park") is a public park located in Bakersfield, California. The park is 32 acres (130,000 m^{2}), and contains two lakes connected by a stream. It is also the location of the Dignity Health Amphitheater (formerly known as the Bright House Amphitheater Before the company's corporate restructuring in August 2016), an outdoor venue often used for concerts and other entertainment. It has even been described as Bakersfield's "...premier outdoor performance venue." Many well known artists, including The Doobie Brothers, Earth Wind & Fire, and Peter Frampton have performed here. one of two large outdoor theaters in Bakersfield (the other is the Outdoor Theater at Bakersfield College). The park is located next to the Kern River Bike Trail. It is also located near the Calloway Drive Interchange for the Westside Parkway.

== History ==
When the land between the Kern River and Stockdale Highway was divided for future development, an odd-shaped lot was created. The lot was L-shaped, with limited street access. It also had large frontage access to the river, and the Kern River Parkway. The land provided the perfect location for a large public park. As a result, the land was donated to the City of Bakersfield in 1995.

In coordination with the developer and the City, the land was developed into a public park. It was also given to the city for maintenance and operation. The park also became the centerpiece for the development, which includes a mixture of residential, commercial, and retail space. The park was completed and opened in 2006.

== Amenities ==
The park consists of two lakes, which also act as water recharge basins for ground water. The upper lake has a surface area of 3 acres (12,000 m^{2}). The lower lake is 2 acres (8,100 m^{2}) and has become a popular fishing spot. Both the upper and lower lakes contain bluegill, green sunfish, greengill sunfish, largemouth bass, common carp, white crappie, yellow bullhead, channel catfish, and rainbow trout. Both lakes are connected by a stream that winds through the park. Four bridges cross the stream. The centerpiece of the park is the Bright House Amphitheater. The stage was designed to appear to be an island, with the lake behind it and a stream running in front. An access road, hidden from the seating area, allows for large equipment to be moved in.

Other amenities include six covered picnic areas, with seating capacities ranging from 16 to 48 people. There are also many other individual picnic tables and barbecues scattered throughout the park, as well as a playground. There is also a gazebo located on the west side.

The park was designed as a rural retreat, similar in style to mountain recreation areas. Both architectural designs, as well as landscaping, were chosen to further this goal. The primary style for the buildings is river rock walls and brown tile roofs. The foot bridges have metal arch support, with a wood plank floor. A similar style bridge (with concrete instead of wood) crosses the Kern River near the park as a short extension to the bike path. Most of the plants used in the park are native to the river. However, the park, as well as the surrounding neighborhood, also uses an abundance of flowering trees, which adds a different look each season.
