= Beach Park (Bakersfield) =

Park in Bakersfield, California, United States

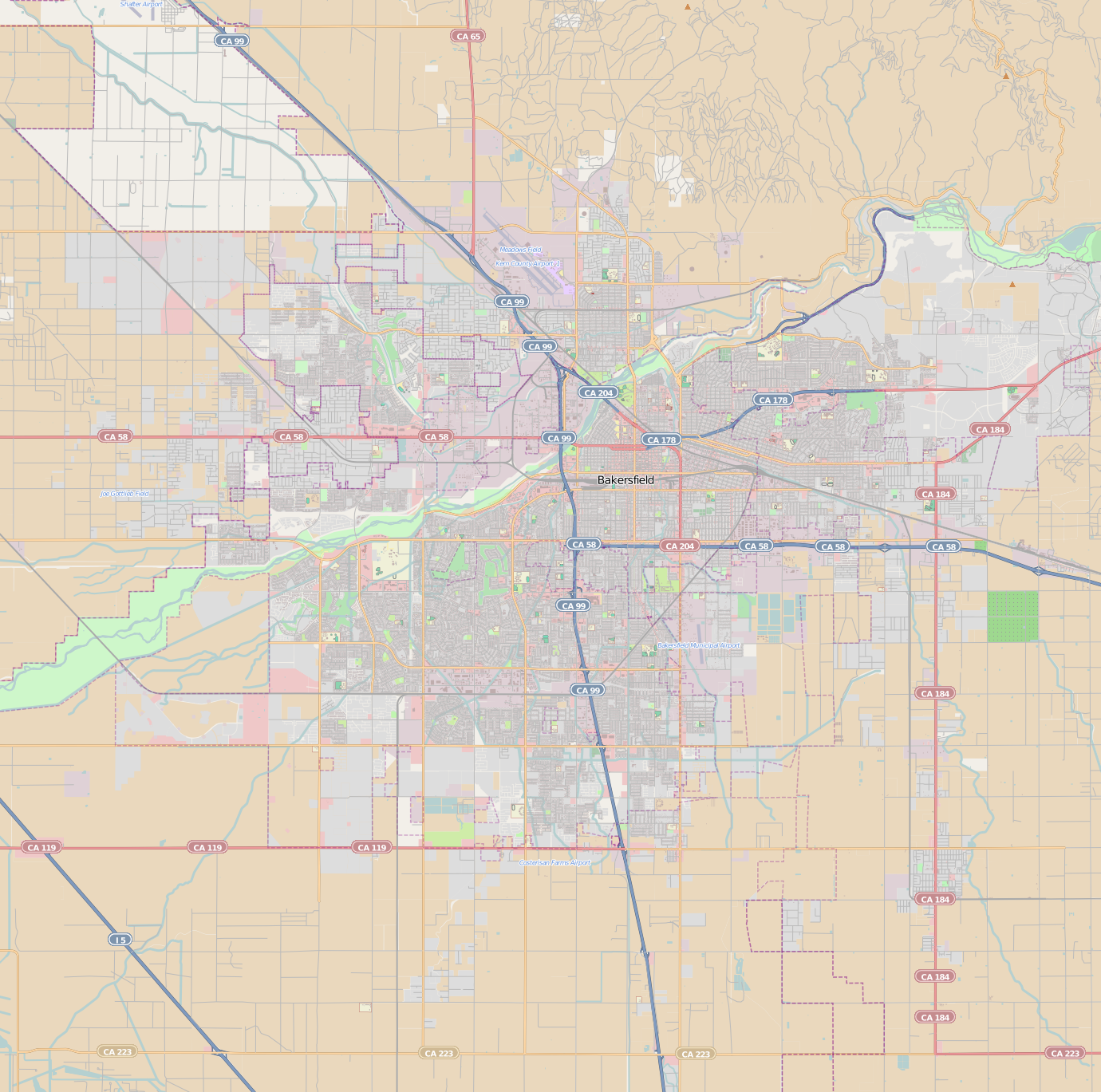
- Location within Bakersfield, California Location within California
- Interactive map of Beach Park
- Type: Public Park
- Location: Bakersfield, California
- Coordinates: 35°22′46″N 119°02′25″W
- Area: 26 acres (11 ha)
- Operator: Bakersfield Department of Recreation and Parks
- Open: All year

Beach Park is a public park in Bakersfield, California. It is located at the major intersection of 24th street and Oak street, which makes it one of the more visible parks in the city. It is directly adjacent to the Kern River Parkway, and is used as a staging area for the various trails in the parkway.

== Amenities ==
Beach Park is one of a few parks that contains a lighted baseball field. The field contains a fenced field with bleachers. It also contains 26 lighted and fenced horseshoe pits. They are used for horseshoe competitions. There is also a lighted football/soccer field (although there are no bleachers). The park also contains a skate park.

The park contains a small reservable picnic area. It contains tables and barbecue. There are several individual picnic areas. They seat between 8 and 16 and some also have barbecue. The park also includes restrooms, and a playground.

One small corner of the park has a rectangular maze, which is the remnants of the Cancer Survivors Park; all of the sculpture's figures were stolen.
