= Henry W. Bloch =

American businessman and philanthropist (1922–2019)

- Born: Henry Wollman Bloch; July 30, 1922; Kansas City, Missouri, U.S.
- Died: April 23, 2019 (aged 96); Kansas City, Missouri, U.S.
- Education: Southwest High School; University of Michigan; University of Missouri–Kansas City
- Occupations: Founder and businessman
- Known for: Co-founder of H&R Block
- Spouse: Marion Helzberg
- Children: 4
- Relatives: Richard Bloch (brother)

Henry Wollman Bloch (July 30, 1922 – April 23, 2019) was an American businessman and philanthropist who was the co-founder and (since 2000) the chairman emeritus of the American tax-preparation company H&R Block. He and his brother, Richard Bloch, founded H&R Block in 1955 in Kansas City, Missouri.

== Early life and education ==
Bloch was born to a Jewish family in Kansas City on July 30, 1922, the son of Hortense (Bienenstock) and Leon Bloch. He attended Southwest High School, and was an undergraduate at University of Missouri–Kansas City. He later attended the University of Michigan in Ann Arbor, Michigan, graduating in 1944. He was initiated as a brother of Zeta Beta Tau fraternity's Phi chapter at the University of Michigan in 1940. Through the U.S. Army Air Corps he received graduate training at the Harvard Business School in Boston, Massachusetts.

== Career ==
In 1945, following World War II, Bloch and his brother Leon founded United Business Company, joined later by his brother Richard in 1946 after Leon left to pursue a law degree. The company provided bookkeeping and tax preparation services in Kansas City, then expanded tax preparation services after a successful advertising campaign in the Kansas City Star and the Internal Revenue Service decision to phase out free preparation services. Bloch officially founded the H&R Block company with his brother Richard in 1955.

As Henry often explained in interviews, the misspelling in their corporate name of their surname was to reflect their family's proper pronunciation, as opposed to "blahch" or "blowch". By 1962, H&R Block became a public company, and in 2019, there are more than 12,000 H&R Block offices. Bloch himself became a fixture for many years in television ads, delivering slogans like "Don't face the laws alone."

== Personal life and honors ==
In 1951, Bloch married Marion Helzberg; they had four children: Robert Bloch, Thomas Bloch, Mary Jo Bloch Brown, and Elizabeth Bloch Uhlmann and lived in the Kansas City metropolitan area.

In 1980, Bloch received the Golden Plate Award of the American Academy of Achievement.

The Henry Wollman Bloch Fountain in front of Kansas City's Union Station is named in his honor, as is the Henry W. Bloch School of Management at the University of Missouri–Kansas City and the Bloch Building, a major addition to Kansas City's Nelson-Atkins Museum of Art.

Bloch was inducted into the Junior Achievement's U.S. Business Hall of Fame in 2001.

I've always wanted to do something different, something more than just a job, something to contribute to society.

— Henry W. Bloch

== Death ==
Bloch died in Kansas City on April 23, 2019, in hospice care at the age of 96. He was remembered by Jeff Jones, President and Chief Executive Officer of H&R Block Inc. as a model for entrepreneurs. "Through his honesty and integrity, Henry embodied the best of American business, entrepreneurship and philanthropy. His vision lives on through H&R Block associates and the many philanthropic organizations that he supported."

== See also ==
- List of entrepreneurs
- List of people from Kansas City, Missouri
- List of University of Michigan alumni
