= Spanish Landing Park =

Historical Landmark and Park in San Diego, California, United States

Spanish Landing Spanish Landing Park
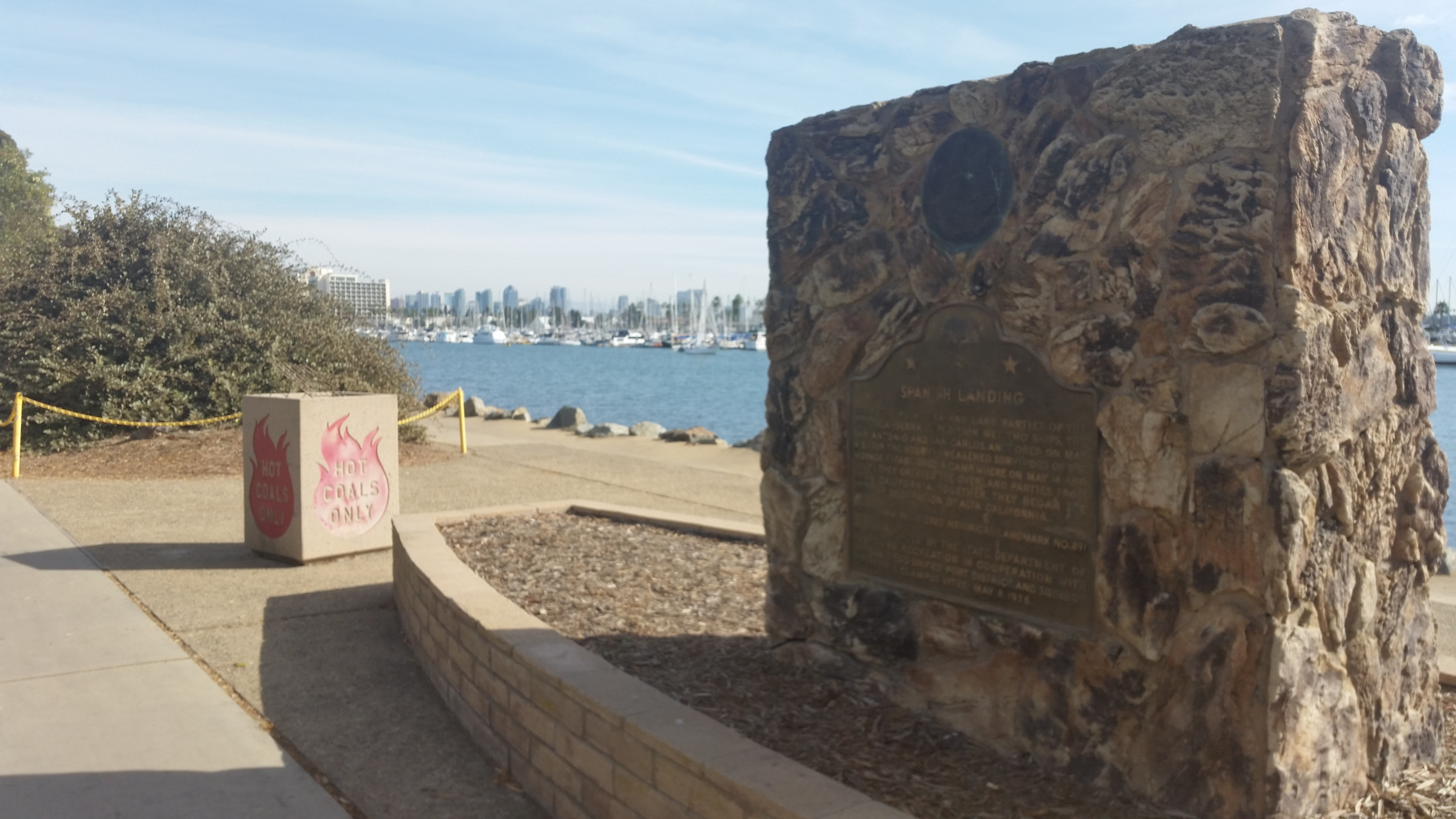
- Spanish landing landmark

- Location within California Location within the United States
- 32.728°N 117.207°W
- Location: Spanish Landing Park, San Diego, California

History
- Built: April 29, 1769

Site notes
- Architect: Gaspar de Portolá
- Architectural styles: New Spain landing and campsite

California Historical Landmark
- Designated: February 20, 1976
- Reference no.: 891

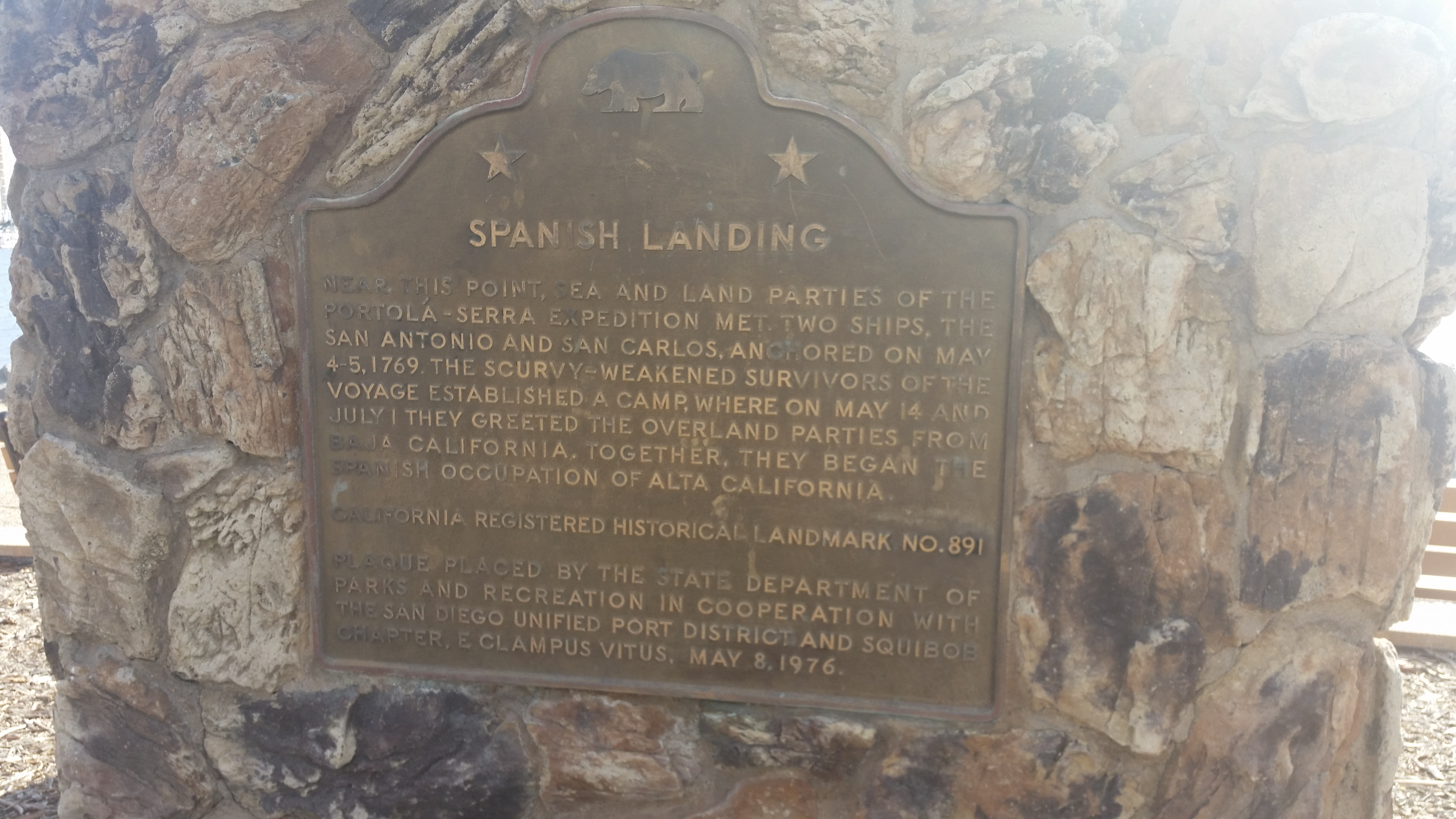
Spanish Landing landmark at Spanish Landing park

Spanish Landing is a historical site at Spanish Landing Park in San Diego, California, at San Diego Bay. The Spanish Landing site is a California Historical Landmark No. 891 listed on February 20, 1976. It is the site of landing by the Spanish Portolá expedition with leaders Gaspar de Portolá and Junípero Serra.

The Spanish ships San Antonio and San Carlos landed ship's boats at the site in 1769, looking for fresh water on the San Diego River, on their San Diego expedition. San Antonio arrived in San Diego Bay on April 11, 1769, and San Carlos on April 29. They came ashore on May 1, 1769, and set up a base camp on May 14. On July 1, the ships' party met up with the party that had marched inland from Baja California. The Spanish landing started the founding of Alta California for the Spanish Empire.

A historical marker was placed in Spanish Landing Park in San Diego. The marker was placed there in 1976 by the State Department of Parks and Recreation working with the San Diego Unified Port District and Squibob Chapter, E Clampus Vitus.

== Spanish Landing Park ==
Spanish Landing Park is on the San Diego waterfront. The park as the Spanish Landing historical marker, a beach, small playgrounds (Spanish playground), restrooms, art displays, a waterfront walkway (Spanish Landing Trail), Gator By The Bay Stage, Cancer Survivors Park display, and picnic tables. The park is on the north shore of the bay's West Basin, across from the Harbor Island marina on Harbor Island Drive. The park is divided in two parts, Spanish Landing Park West and Spanish Landing Park East at the Port of San Diego. The park is just south of San Diego International Airport

== Cancer Survivors Park ==
Cancer Survivors Park is at the east end of Spanish Landing Park. Cancer Survivors Parks are parks funded by the Bloch Foundation. The park has a walkway with various bronze plaques. There are life-size bronze sculptures shown passing through a cancer treatment. There are Road to Recovery plaques.

== Gallery ==
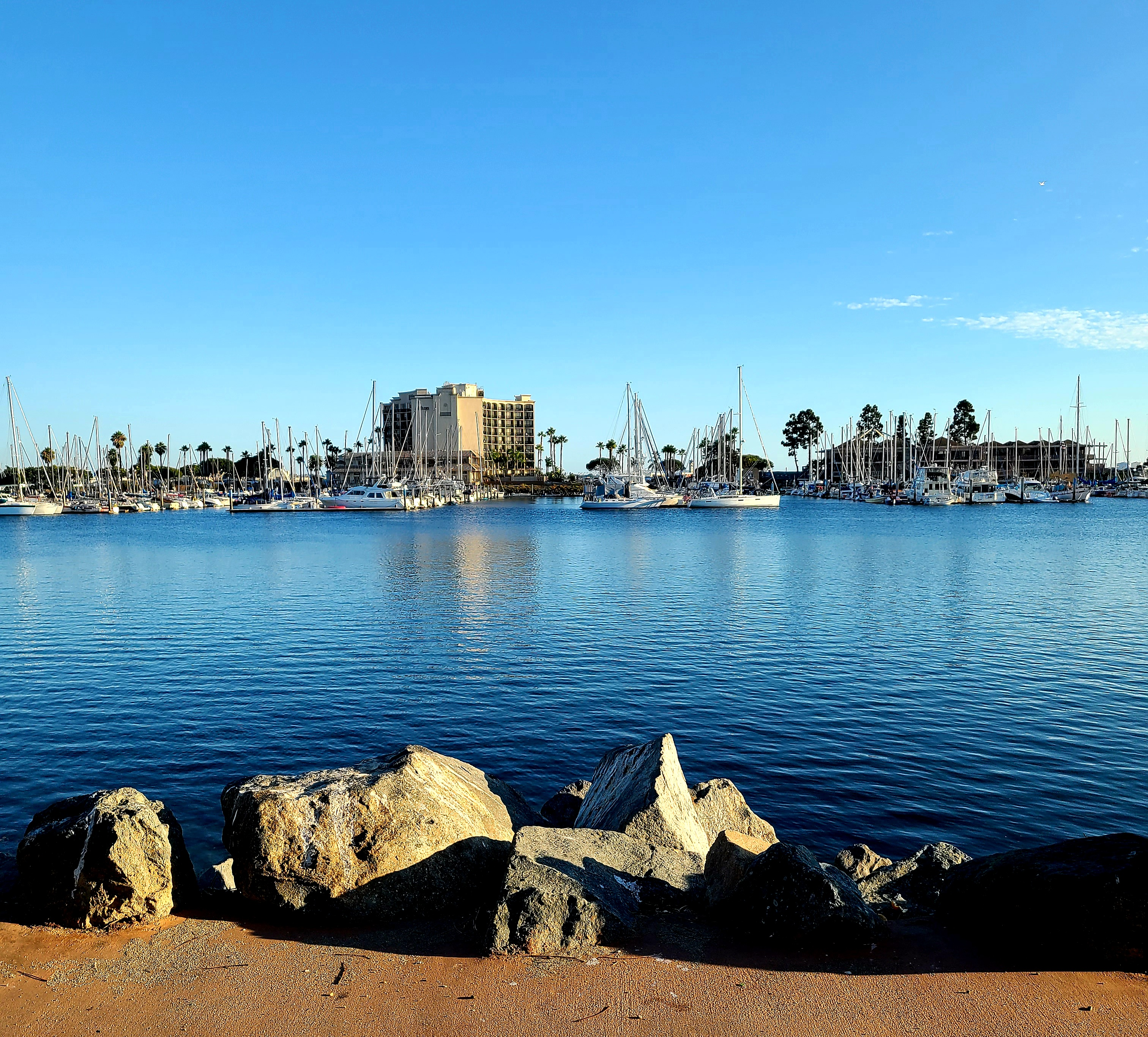
Harbor Island as seen from Spanish Landing Park

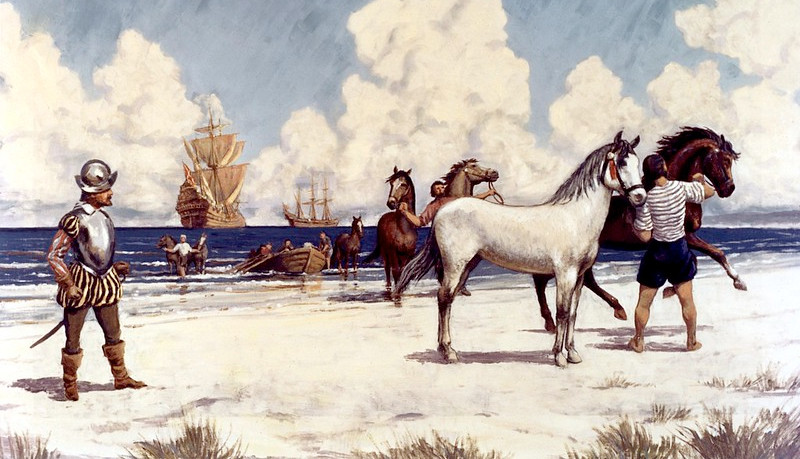
Spanish Landing art work

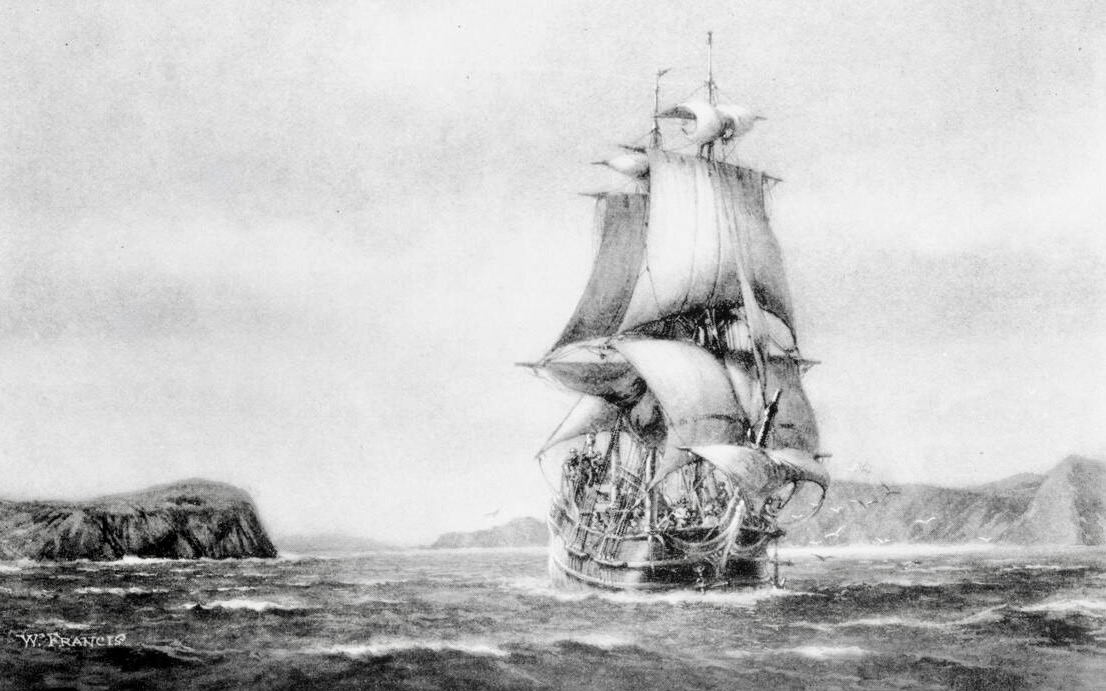
San Carlos landed in San Diego on April 29, 1769

== See also ==
- California Historical Landmarks in San Diego County
- Timeline of the Portolá expedition
- Maritime Museum of San Diego
- Mission San Diego de Alcalá
- Presidio of San Diego
