= Kern River Parkway =

Park in California, United States

- Interactive map of Kern River Parkway
- Type: Natural Preserve
- Location: Bakersfield, California
- Coordinates: 35.366°N 119.071°W
- Area: 6,000 acres (2,400 ha)
- Created: 1976
- Operator: Bakersfield Department of Recreation and Parks
- Open: All year

The Kern River Parkway is primarily a natural preserve in Bakersfield, California. It runs the length of the Kern River from the mouth of the Kern Canyon to Interstate 5. At 6,000 acres, it is the largest municipal park in the county. The parkway was created in 1976 when the city purchased all assets related to the Kern River from Tenneco West.

== Park description ==
There are two trails through the park. On the north is an equestrian trail. The trail on the south is known as a jogging trail, but can also be used with non-motorized forms of transportation. In addition, there is a bike path (Kern River Parkway Trail) that runs from Alfred Harrell Highway in the Northeast to Enos Lane in the Southwest. There are several staging areas located throughout the park. A series of call boxes are placed along the length of the bike path.

Several lakes exist in the parkway. Also, some areas either next to, on inside the parkway have been developed into more formal parks. They are: Beach Park, Hart Park, The Park at River Walk, River Oaks Park, and Yokuts Park.
