= Richard and Annette Bloch Cancer Survivors Garden =

Coordinates: 41.8836°N 87.6174°W

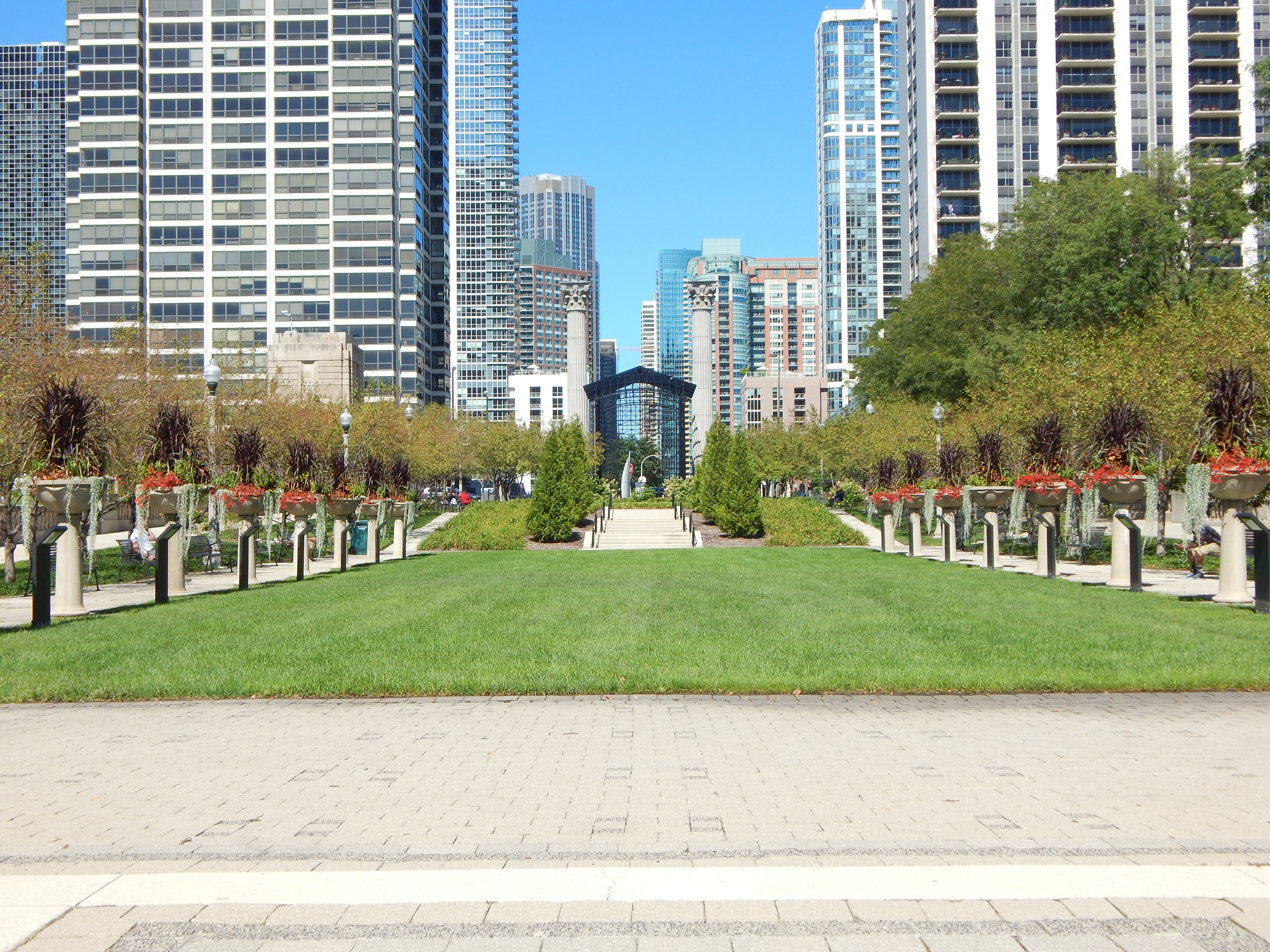
- Perennial Garden walkway
- Interactive map of Richard and Annette Bloch Cancer Survivors Garden
- Type: Garden
- Location: Grant Park, Chicago, Illinois
- Area: 2.25 acres (9,100 m^{2})
- Created: 1996
- Operator: Chicago Park District
- Status: Open all year (daily 6 a.m. to 11 p.m.)
- Public transit: CTA; Brown Green Orange Pink Purple; MED SSL
- Website: maggiedaleypark.com/things-to-do-see/cancer-survivors-garden/

The Richard and Annette Bloch Cancer Survivors Garden was built in 1996 and occupies 2 ¼ acres of land in the Northeast corner of Maggie Daley Park. The garden located in Chicago is one of 24 Cancer Survivor parks across the country built by the Richard and Annette Bloch Cancer Foundation. The R.A. Cancer Foundation primarily funded the garden costing $1.3 million to create. The park is designed to be a celebration of life. It is a safe haven for cancer patients and meant to aid them in their healing process. The three main garden rooms represent the three main states of healing: acceptance, support, and celebration.

== Features ==
=== Federal Building Columns ===
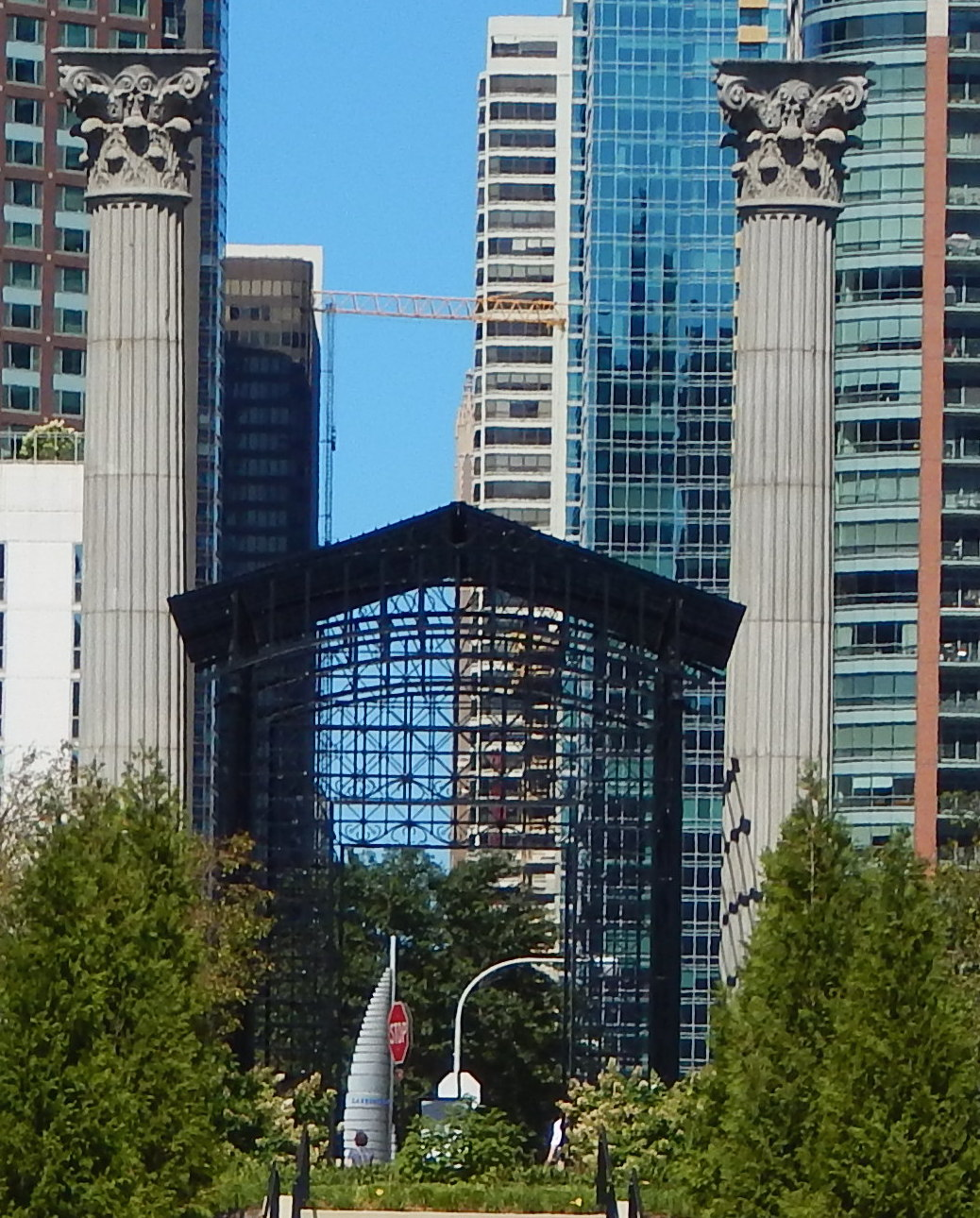
1905 Federal Building Columns

At its entrance are two 40-foot Corinthian columns salvaged from Chicago’s 1905 Federal Building. The columns are on axis with the classical columns of the Field Museum of Natural History located at the far south end of Grant Park. Architect Henry Ives Cobb designed the columns. Before being placed in the Cancer Survivors Garden, the columns were submerged near the Lake Michigan shoreline in 1983 to help reinforce a breakwater. The Chicago Architecture Foundation donated the columns to be placed next to the garden’s main pavilion.

=== Pavilions ===
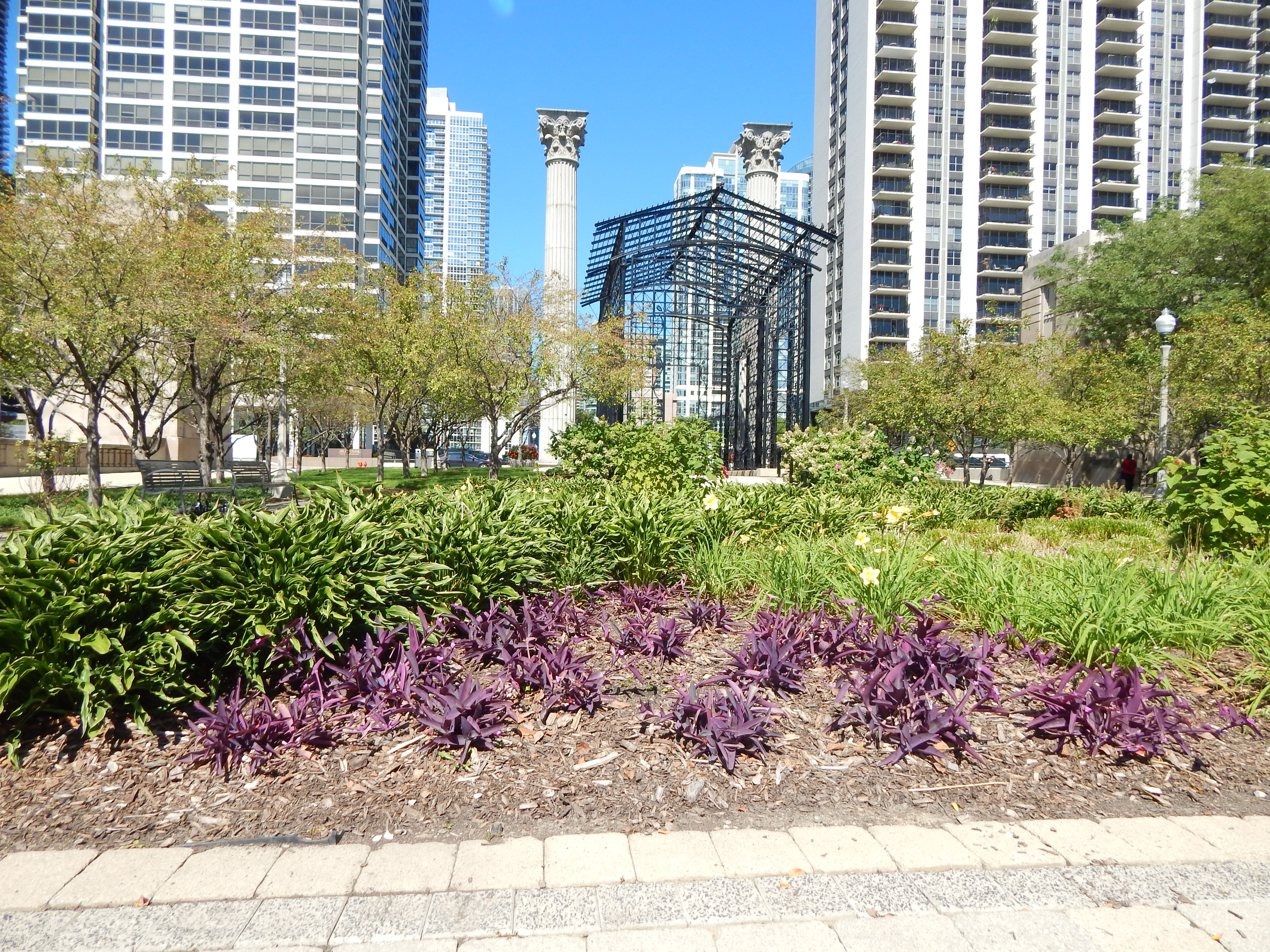
Main pavilion at the Cancer Survivors Garden entrance

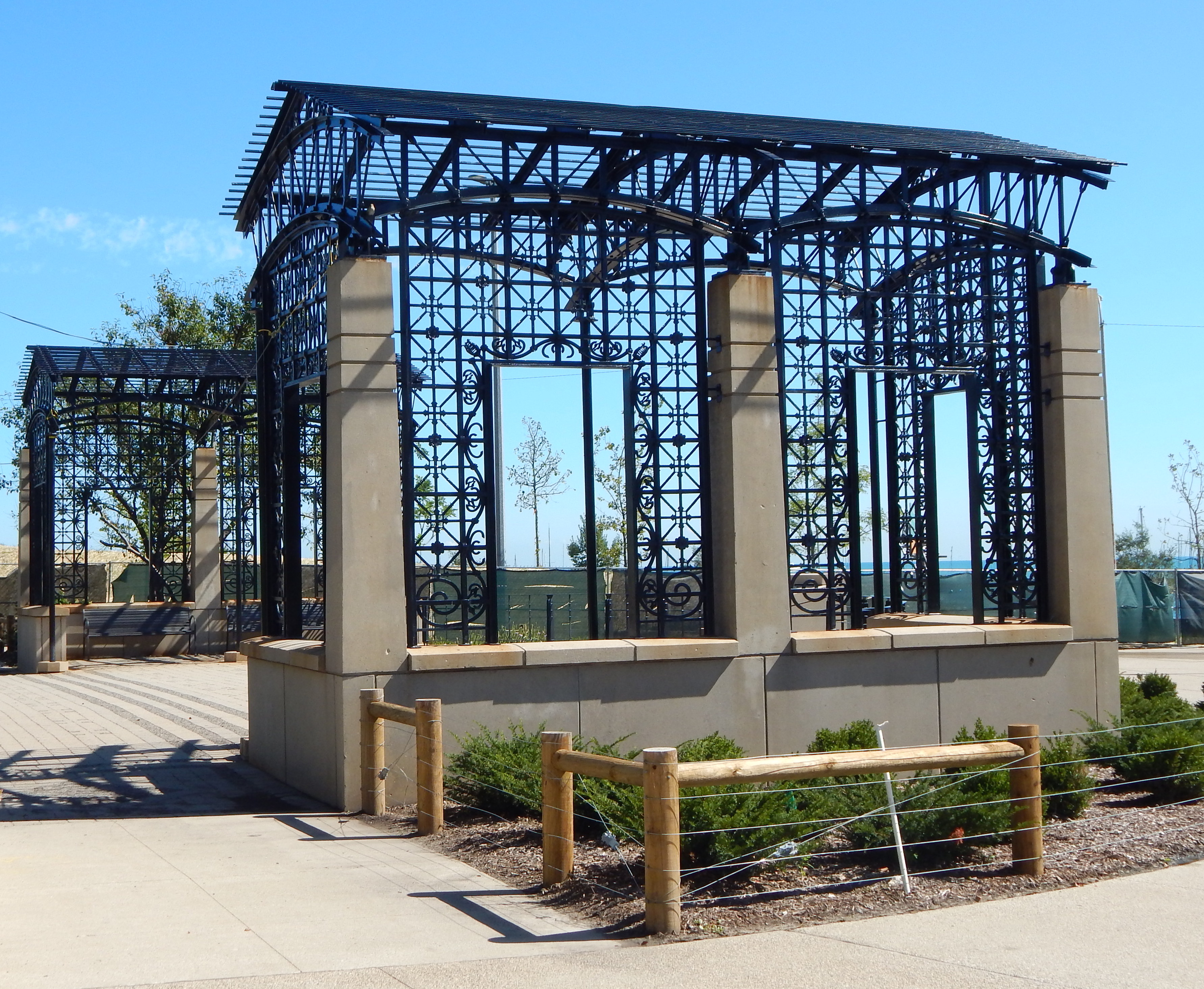
Cancer Survivors Garden pavilions located on the South end of the garden

The garden contains a total of 3 pavilions. The main pavilion, at the park's entrance, represents the “Road To Recovery” for cancer patients. Inside the pavilion are 7 plaques explaining the basic steps to overcome cancer. Two other pavilions are located on the southern end of the garden.

=== Perennial Garden Walkway ===
The perennial garden walkway is lined with flowers, trees, and shrubs. Throughout the path there are 16 plaques that have inspirational quotes and resources for cancer patients. An example of a quote from one of these plaques is, “Make up your mind that when your Cancer is gone, you are through with it”. The path is designed to give cancer patients a positive attitude. Furthermore, this section of the garden can also be rented for events such as weddings.

== Funding ==
Richard and Annette’s Cancer foundation originally funded the park, but throughout recent years it has struggled to find funding. Before the creation of Maggie Daley Park, the park struggled with theft and lack of proper plant maintenance. By 2012, private funds for the garden were dwindling and the Park District lacked funds for costly maintenance. Maintenance costs for the summer alone can reach $60,000. Today the park is being maintained as a part of Maggie Daley Park.

== See also ==
- Cancer Survivors Park
