= Jeff Jones (executive) =

American business executive (born 1967)

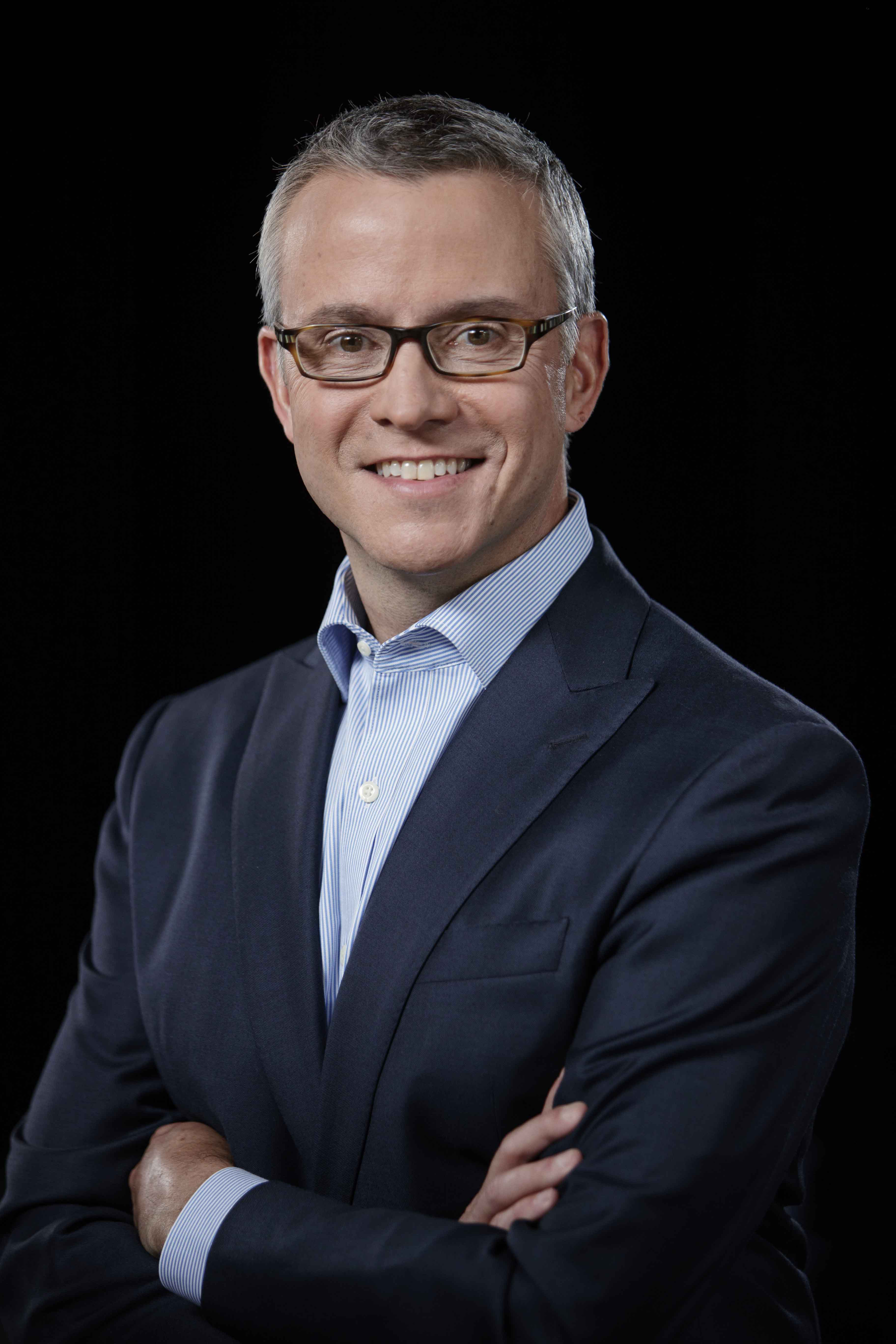
- Jeff Jones pictured in 2017
- Born: Jeffrey J. Jones II; 1967 (age 58–59)
- Occupation: Business executive
- Known for: President and CEO of H&R Block; Former President of Uber; Former CMO of Target

Jeffrey J. Jones II (born 1967) is an American business executive. He served as president and chief executive officer of H&R Block from 2017 to 2025. He formerly held executive posts with Target Corporation, Uber and Gap Inc.

== Early life ==
Jeff Jones is an alumnus of Fork Union Military Academy. In 1990, he graduated from the University of Dayton with a Bachelor of Arts in communication.

== Career ==
At The Gap, Inc., Jones was executive vice president and chief marketing officer. He led the company's global marketing strategy in addition to store redesign and experience, and consumer communications. Jones led a move toward Web-based marketing and helped create partnerships with iTunes, Kodak and Borders Books. Jones is also noted for tapping Sarah Jessica Parker to promote The Gap's fashion. Jones also worked for The Coca-Cola Company, where he was global account director.

In addition, Jones worked for the advertising agency Leo Burnett Company, Inc., where he performed work for clients including General Motors Company, MillerCoors, and Procter & Gamble Co. and founded a tech-focused subsidiary called LB Works. He also worked for McKinney, a Durham, North Carolina-based advertising agency where he was a partner and president, and served on its board. At McKinney, Jones instituted a 10-percent rule, which stipulated that members of his team spend one-tenth of their time focused on non-client projects.

=== Target ===
Jones left McKinney for Minneapolis, Minnesota–based Target in 2012. At Target, Jones was executive vice president and chief marketing officer. Jones is credited with modernizing Target's brand. He helped drive the brand's positioning through a number of campaigns and partnerships, such as The Holiday Odyssey adventure and musical events including the rollout of Target's exclusive edition of Justin Timberlake's The 20/20 Experience and live music video commercial from Gwen Stefani during the Grammy Awards. He created Falling for You, a three-part short film starring Kristen Bell, integrated the Target/Neiman Marcus collection into the plot of an episode of ABC's Revenge, and oversaw the campaign to promote Timberlake's album across radio, TV, Web, and social media. Target underwent several struggles during Jones' tenure. He helped the retailer recover from a data breach in 2013. The data breach, which occurred shortly before Christmas, led to CEO Gregg Steinhafel's resignation. The company also underwent a failed expansion into Canada.

At Target, Jones stressed the need for content creation as a form of marketing and brand building. Progressive Grocer called Jones the "architect of Target’s on-demand shopping experience". He helped launch the savings app Cartwheel and oversaw the extension of naming rights for the Target Center in Minneapolis. HuffPost named Jones on its list of Top Social CMOs of Fortune 250 Companies on Twitter in 2013, The Wall Street Journal listed Jones on its 5 CMOs to Watch in 2015, and Mass Market Retailer awarded Jones as the 2015 Marketer of the Year. Jones left Target in 2016 to join Uber.

=== Uber ===
Jones first met Uber CEO Travis Kalanick in February 2016 at the TED conference in Vancouver, British Columbia, Canada. The two discussed ways that Uber could improve its reputation. Jones left Target on September 9, 2016, to become the president of Uber. In that role, Jones was in charge of the company's marketing and operations. He was also tasked with improving Uber's reputation amid fast growth and increased scrutiny. While at Uber, Jones was named one of Ad Age's 2016 Power Players. Jones worked at Uber for six months before leaving the company in March 2017. He was among several top executives to leave Uber during a period when the company faced numerous controversies, including sexual harassment in the workplace. At the time, he was the highest-ranking departure. Jones released a statement upon his departure: "It is now clear, however, that the beliefs and approach to leadership that have guided my career are inconsistent with what I saw and experienced at Uber, and I can no longer continue as president of the ride sharing business".

=== H&R Block ===
Jones took his first chief executive post when he became president and CEO of H&R Block, a Kansas City, Missouri–based tax preparer, on October 9, 2017. He replaced Tom Gerke, who was interim CEO following the retirement of former CEO Bill Cobb. Jones is responsible for growing the company to better compete with TurboTax by Intuit and other online tax preparers. He has said he sees H&R Block as a financial services company and a retail company, and aims to grow the company by diversifying its services. He sits on H&R Block's board of directors.

=== Other roles ===
Jones is on the board of directors of Advance Auto Parts. He is a former member of the board of directors of the Association of National Advertisers and an advisor to Zoove Corp. In 2017, he joined media startup Brit + Co as an advisor.

== Personal life ==
Jones and his wife, Margaret, have two daughters. After being hired as CEO of H&R Block, Jones said he would move his family to Kansas City, Missouri.
