= Beale Park (Bakersfield) =

Park in California, United States

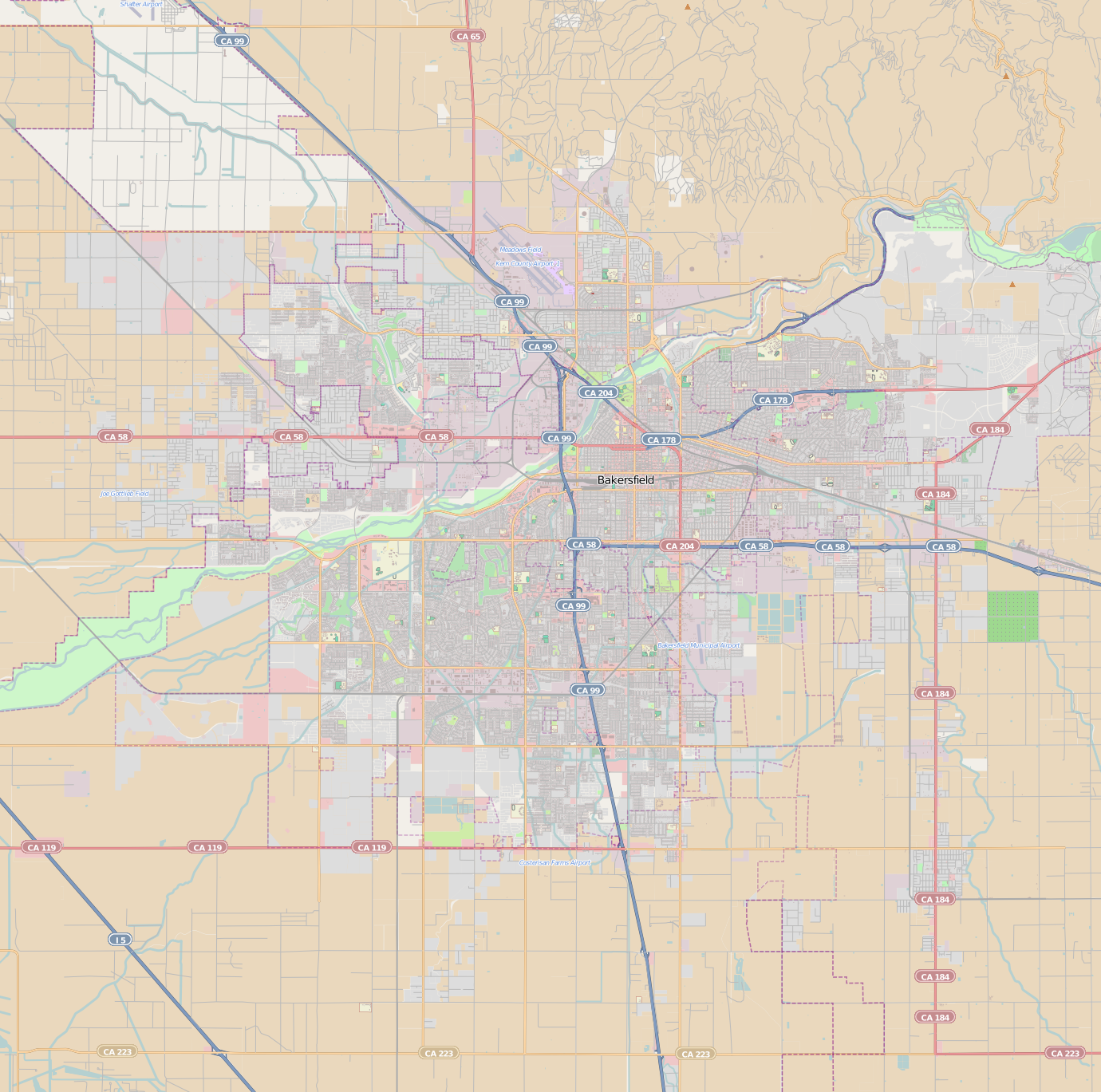
- Location within Bakersfield, California Location within California
- Interactive map of Beale Park
- Type: Public Park
- Location: Bakersfield, California
- Coordinates: 35°21′44″N 119°01′27″W
- Area: 5 acres (20,000 m^{2})
- Created: 1908
- Operator: Bakersfield Department of Recreation and Parks
- Open: All year

Beale Park is a public park located in Bakersfield, California. It is Bakersfield’s first park, located on Oleander St.

== History ==
The park was constructed in 1908, on 5 acres (20,000 m^{2}) of land donated by Truxtun Beale. He also donated landscaping for the park, the Greek style amphitheater and swimming pool. Since then, the park has seen many improvements. Two large reservable picnic areas were added, as well as many smaller individual areas. Several different types of sports courts and fields were also added.

Over the years, the pool, similar to most of the city pools, needed to be refurbished. However, in 2004, with the opening of the aquatics center in Downtown Bakersfield, it was decided not to refurbish the pool. It was removed and replaced with a spray park.

In 1977, a large wind storm hit Bakersfield. The roof of an aviary was blown off, and at least two parakeets escaped. Since then, a large parakeet population has settled in and around the park. This population has also spread to Beach Park and Hart Park. They have grown to be largest population of naturalized parakeets in the world.

== Amenities ==
Beale Park is one of the most equipped city parks in Bakersfield. It has two reservable picnic areas, seating 80 people each. They are both uncovered, and are each equipped with a barbecue, and lights. There are several individual picnic areas, which can seat 8 to 16 people. Some of them are equipped with a barbecue and some others are covered. There is one lit full basketball court, three lit tennis courts, and four lit horseshoe pits. There is also a softball backstop, and a large open field, suitable for most lawn sports. The park also includes restrooms, and a playground.

The park is also one of two parks with an open outdoor amphitheater that includes seating (on terraced grass). The stage is in the Greek style. The Beale Park Band has historically performed concerts at the theater during the summer months.
