= Memphis Botanic Garden =

Botanical garden in Memphis, Tennessee

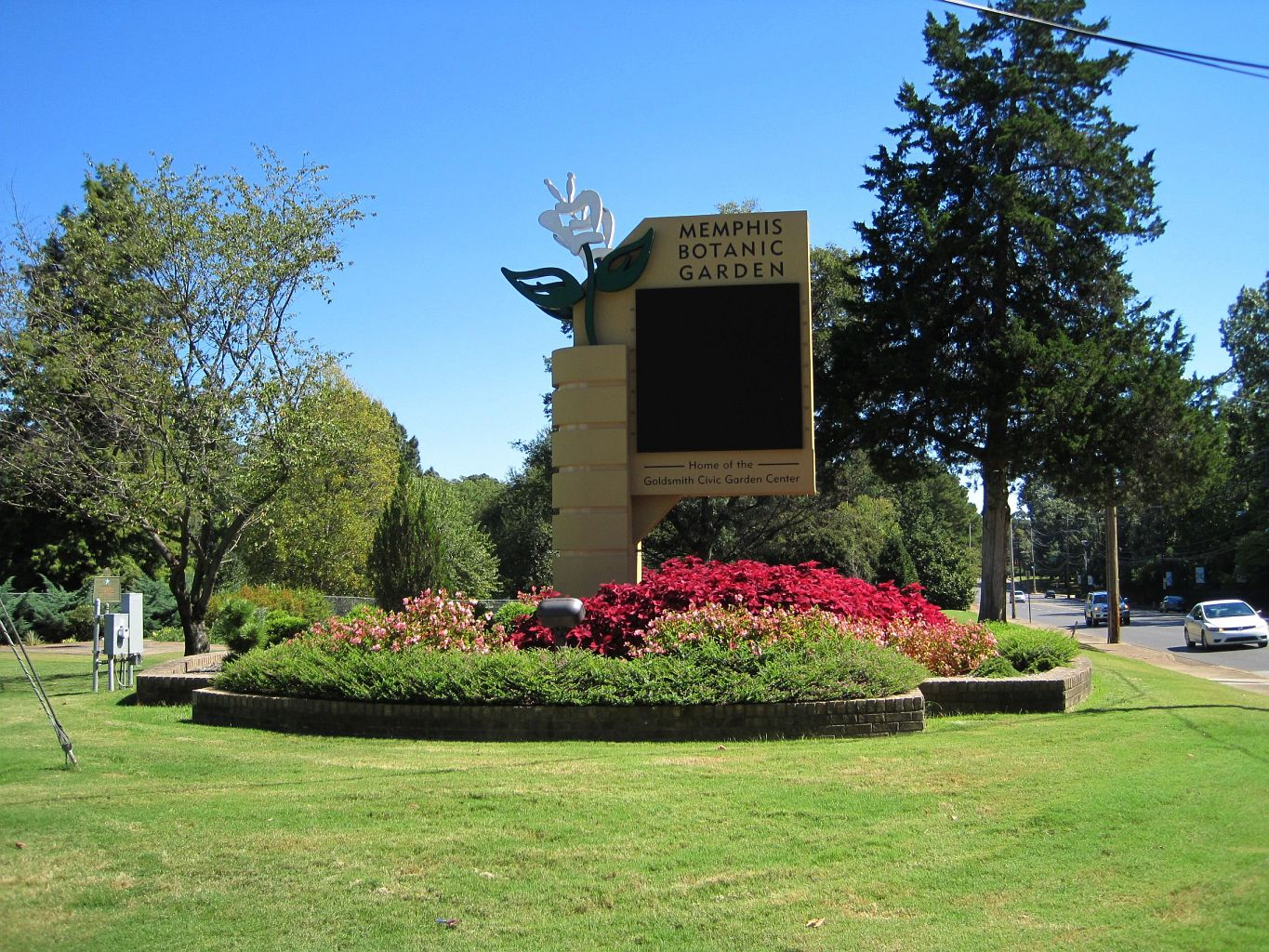
- Interactive map of Memphis Botanic Garden
- Type: Botanical garden
- Location: 750 Cherry Road; Memphis, Tennessee 38117
- Coordinates: 35°06′39″N 89°55′03″W
- Area: 96 acres (39 ha)
- Created: 1953
- Operator: City of Memphis/ Memphis Botanic Garden Foundation
- Open: 9 am-6 pm during Central Daylight Time and 9 am-4:30 pm during Central Standard Time (Winter)
- Status: Open all year
- Public transit: MATA
- Website: membg.org

The Memphis Botanic Garden is a 96-acre (39 ha) botanical garden located in Audubon Park at 750 Cherry Road, Memphis, Tennessee.

Memphis Botanic Garden is open to the public daily. There is also a garden for kids, called 'My Big Backyard'.

Memphis Botanic Garden hosts many community events each year, such as the Daffodil Dash Race, The Family Egg Hunt, and Mother's Day Jazz Brunch. The garden also offers a range of educational programs for youth and adults. Plant sales and a concert series are held throughout the year to benefit its educational and horticultural programs.

The executive director of the garden is MaryLynn Mack.

== History ==
The gardens have gradually been established in Audubon Park from 1953 onwards, including the creation of an arboretum (1957) and magnolia garden (1958), as well as the movement of an existing rose garden to the area (1958).

The Goldsmith Civic Garden Center, housing the Garden's administrative offices, an auditorium and the Water Garden Room, was completed and dedicated in 1964. The gardens were originally named the Gardens of Audubon Park, until they were formally named the Memphis Botanic Garden in 1966.

== Gardens ==
Today the garden contains 23 specialty gardens, including:

- Tennessee Bicentennial Iris Garden - hundreds of varieties of bearded irises, plus other iris types from Louisiana, Japan, Siberia and Spuria.
- Conifer Collection (1981) - including many dwarf conifer varieties.
- Herb Garden (2011) - over 500 types of herbs.
- Japanese Garden of Tranquility (1965, 1989) - designed by Dr. P. T. Tono, Tokyo; redesigned by Dr. Koichi Kawana.
- Rose Garden - 75 rose varieties.
- Sensory Garden (1989)
- Anne Heard Stokes Butterfly Garden (1997)
- Memphis Garden Club Water Garden
- Jim Strickland Tropical Plant House

== Honors ==
The Garden has several unique features and was recently certified as a Level 4 Arboretum, making it one of four in Tennessee.

In 2006, the Garden's Hosta Trail was recognized by the American Hosta Society as one of fifteen nationally certified trails in the U.S. and one of two certified trails in the South. In the same year, the Memphis Botanic Garden became a Blue Star Memorial Garden in cooperation with the National Garden Clubs.

Charity Navigator has awarded the Memphis Botanic Garden as a Four-Star Charity making it in the top 14% of all non-profit organizations in the U.S. for financial management.

== See also ==
- List of botanical gardens in the United States
- Memphis, Tennessee

== Gallery ==
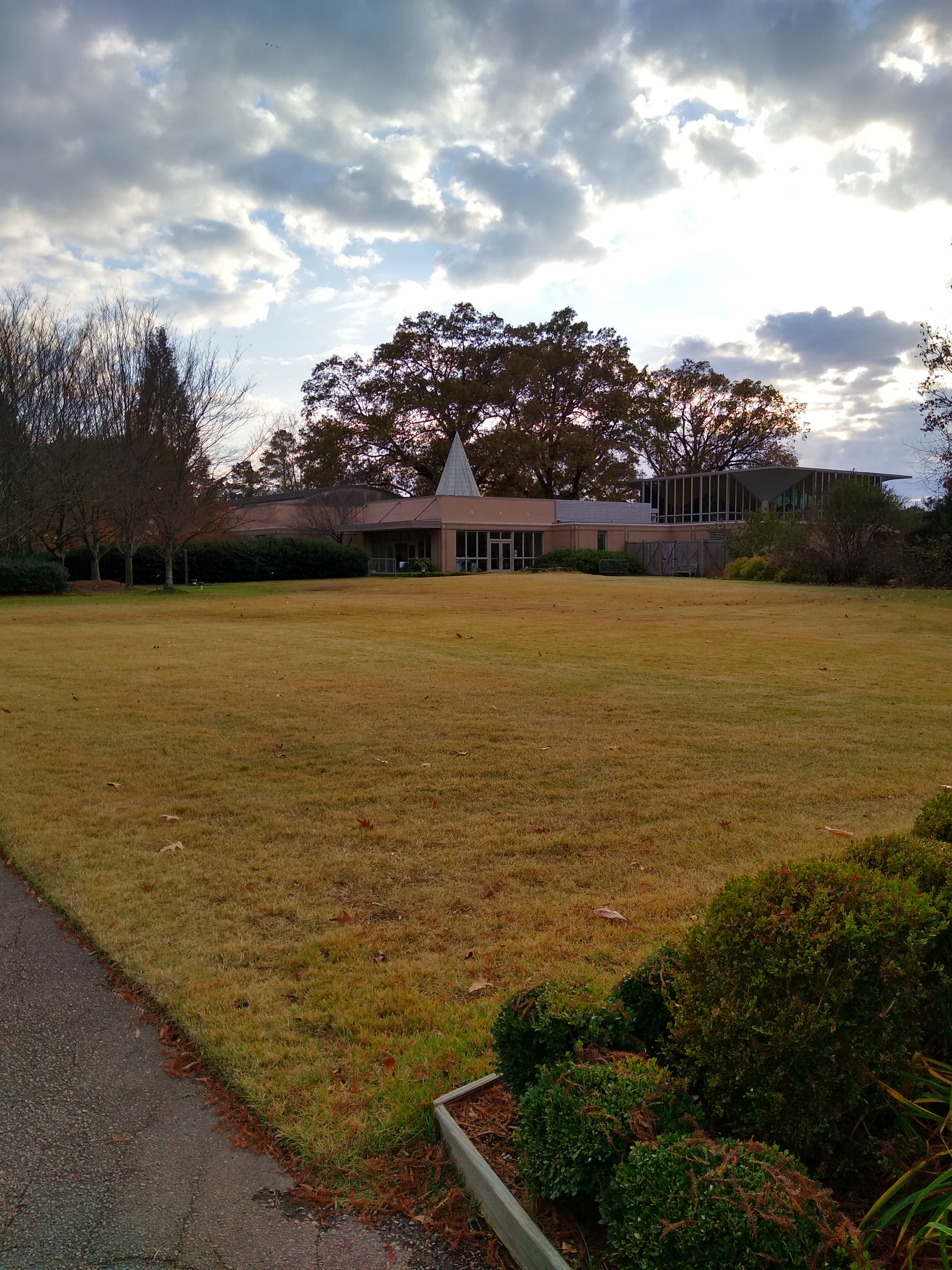
Main building

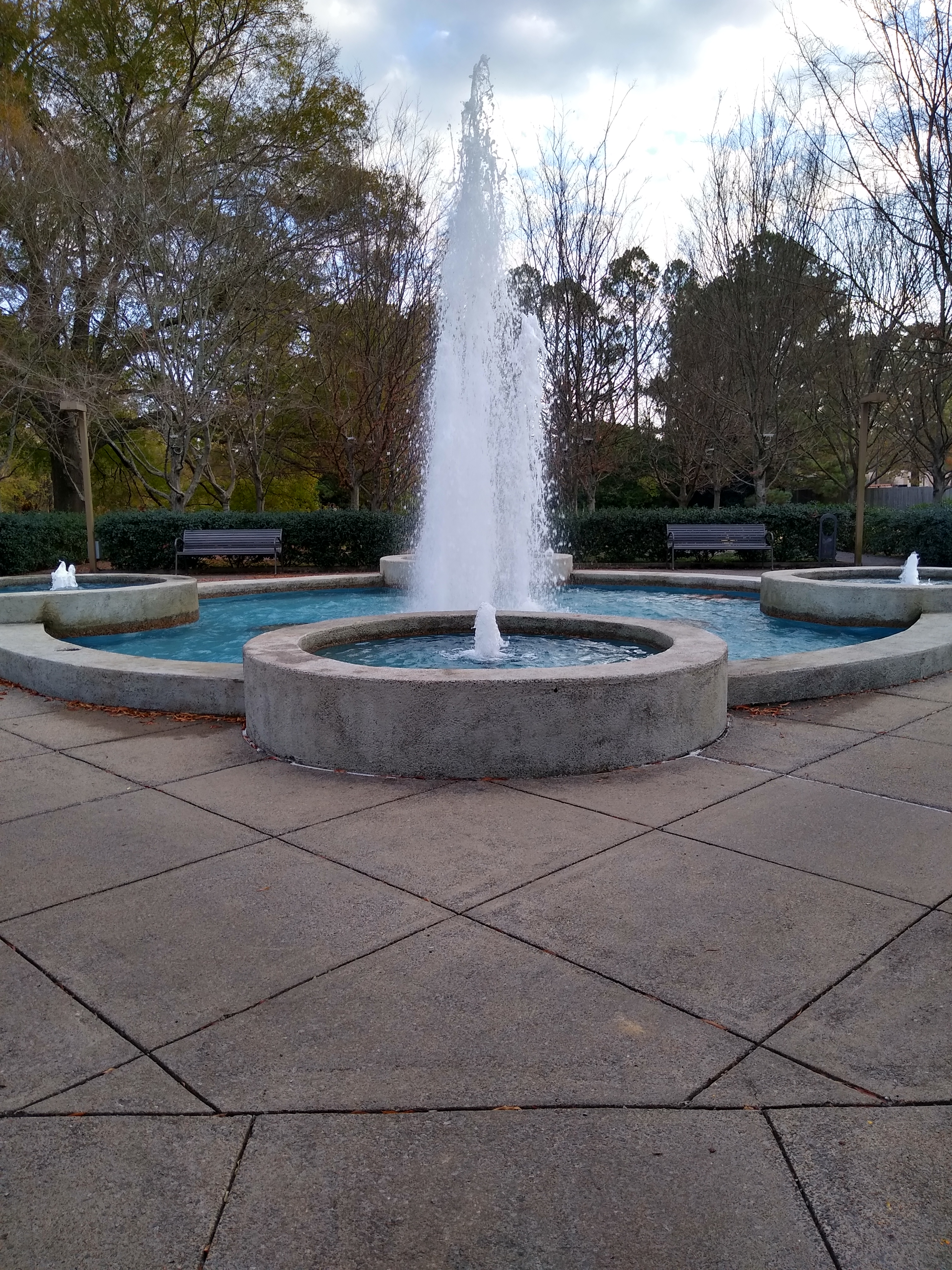
Fountain by the main entrance building

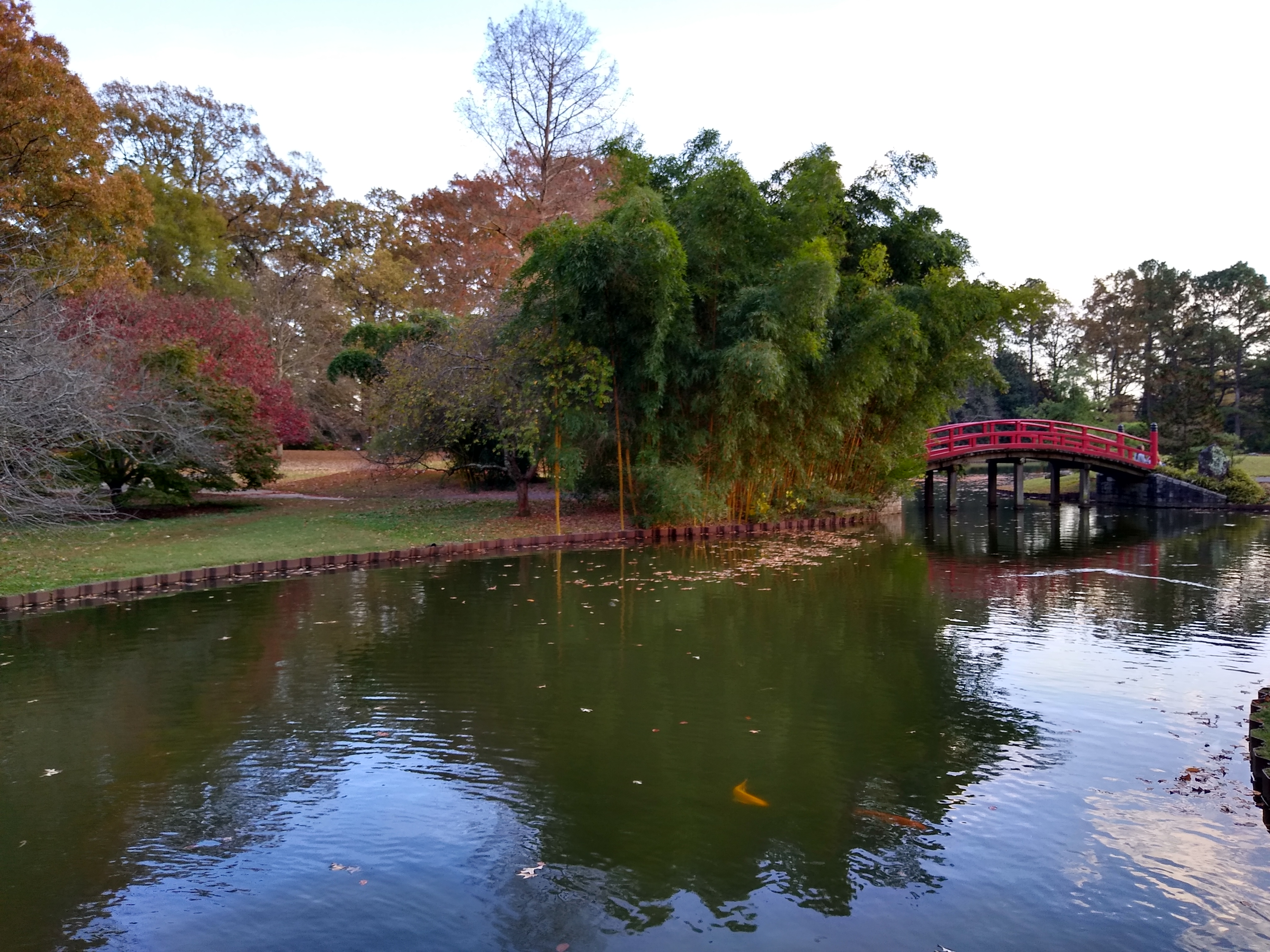
Japanese-style bridge over Lake Biwa

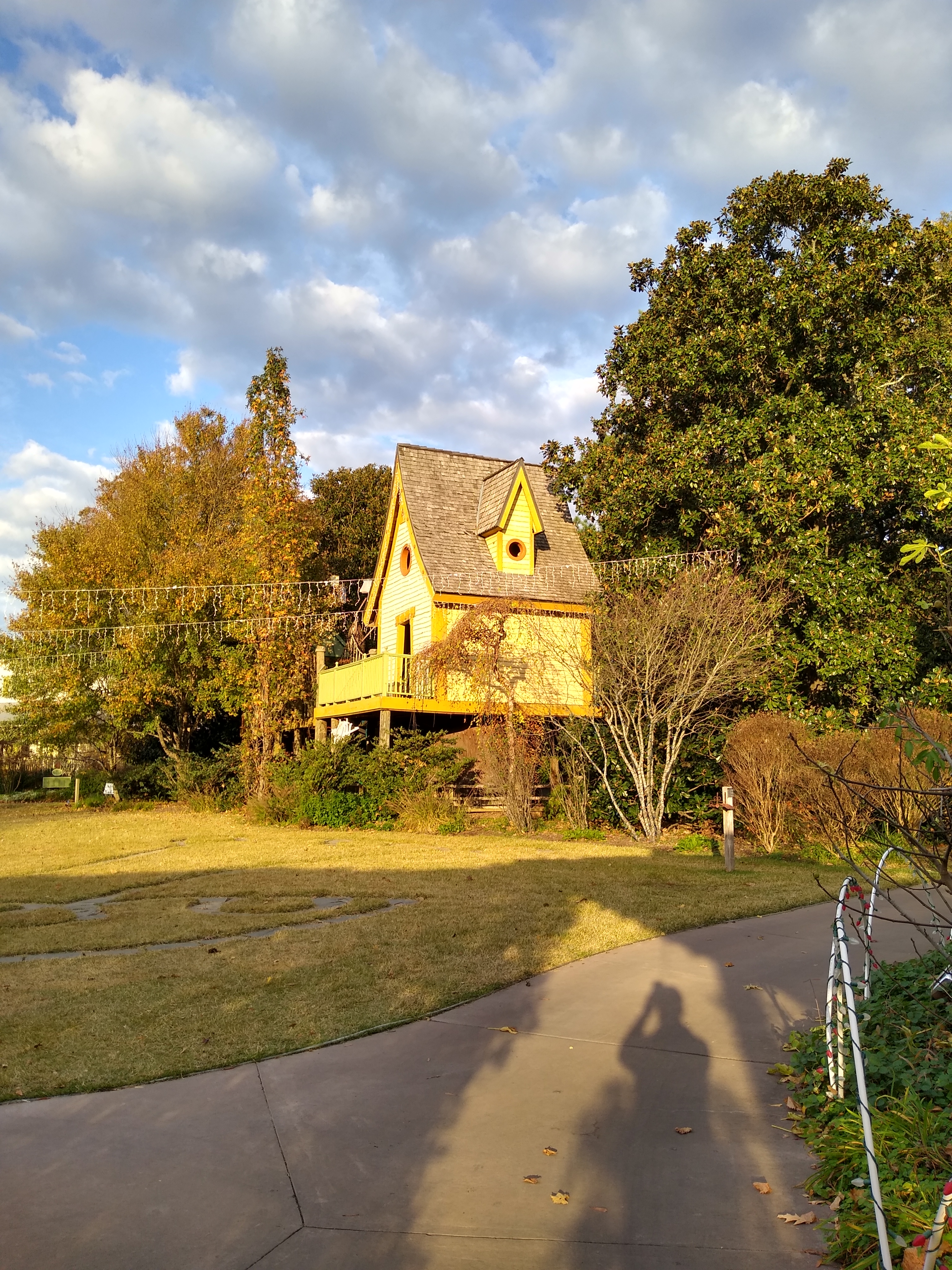
Tree House

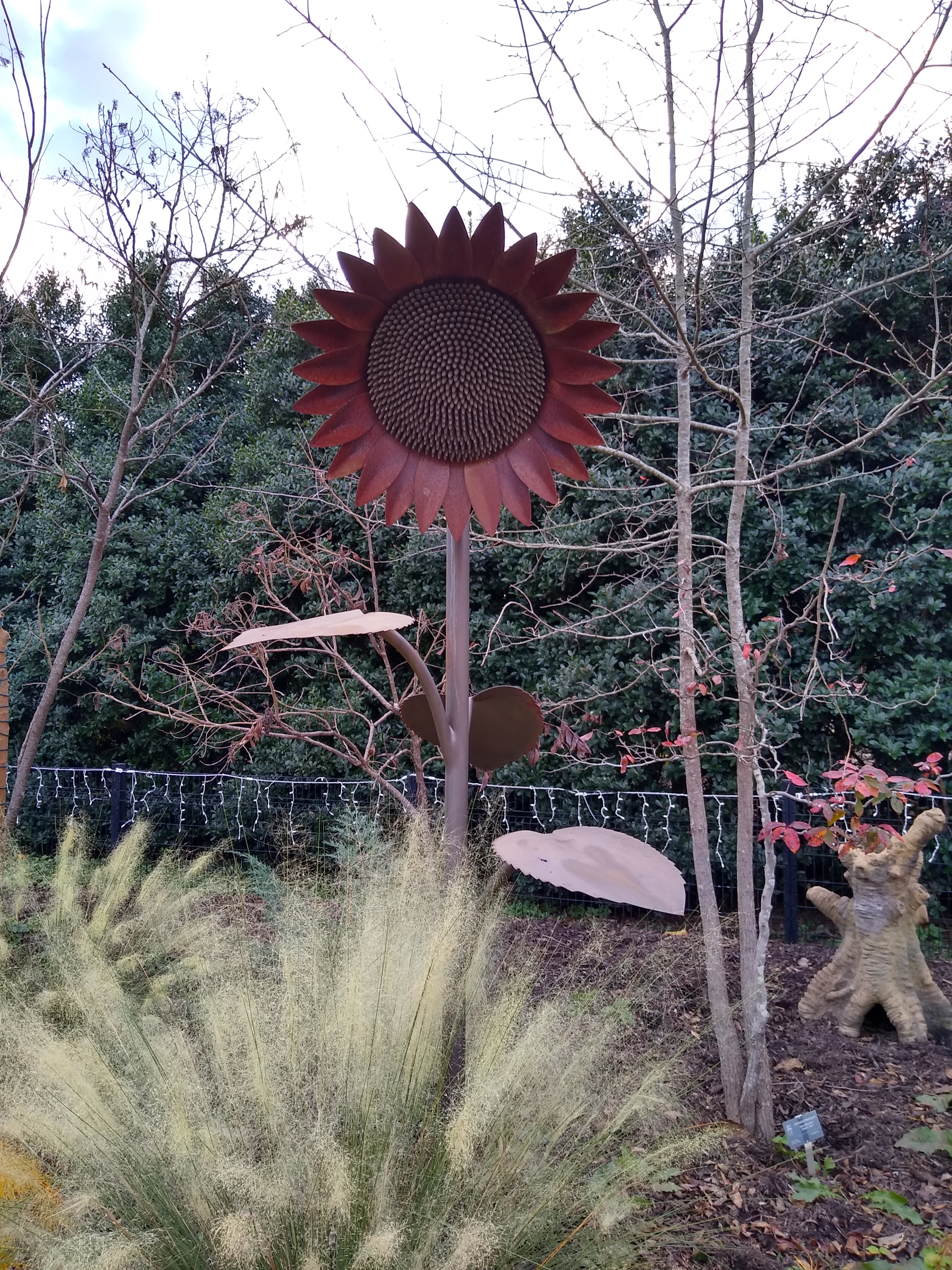
Sunflower art piece by Elisha Gold

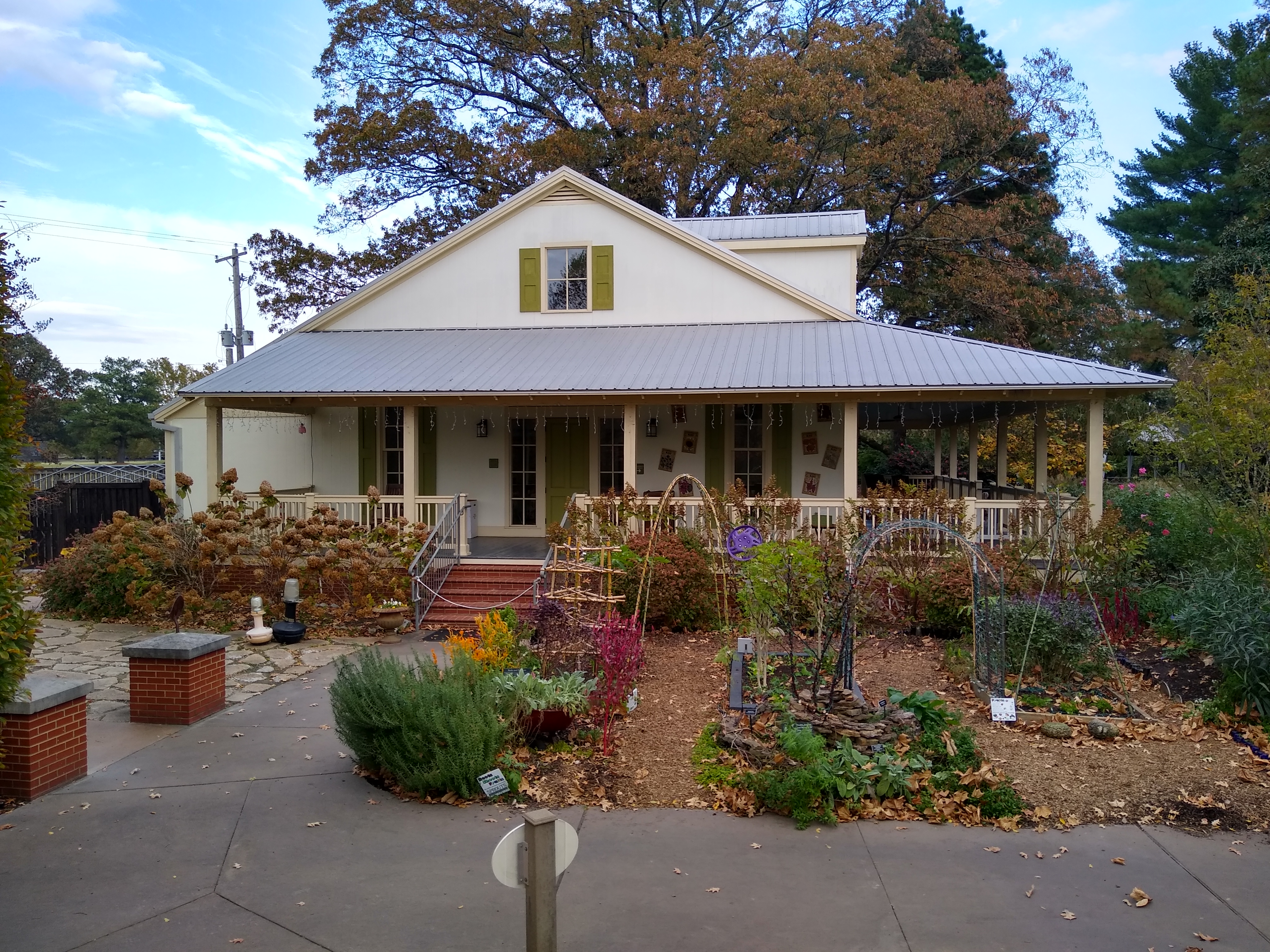
The "Guest House"

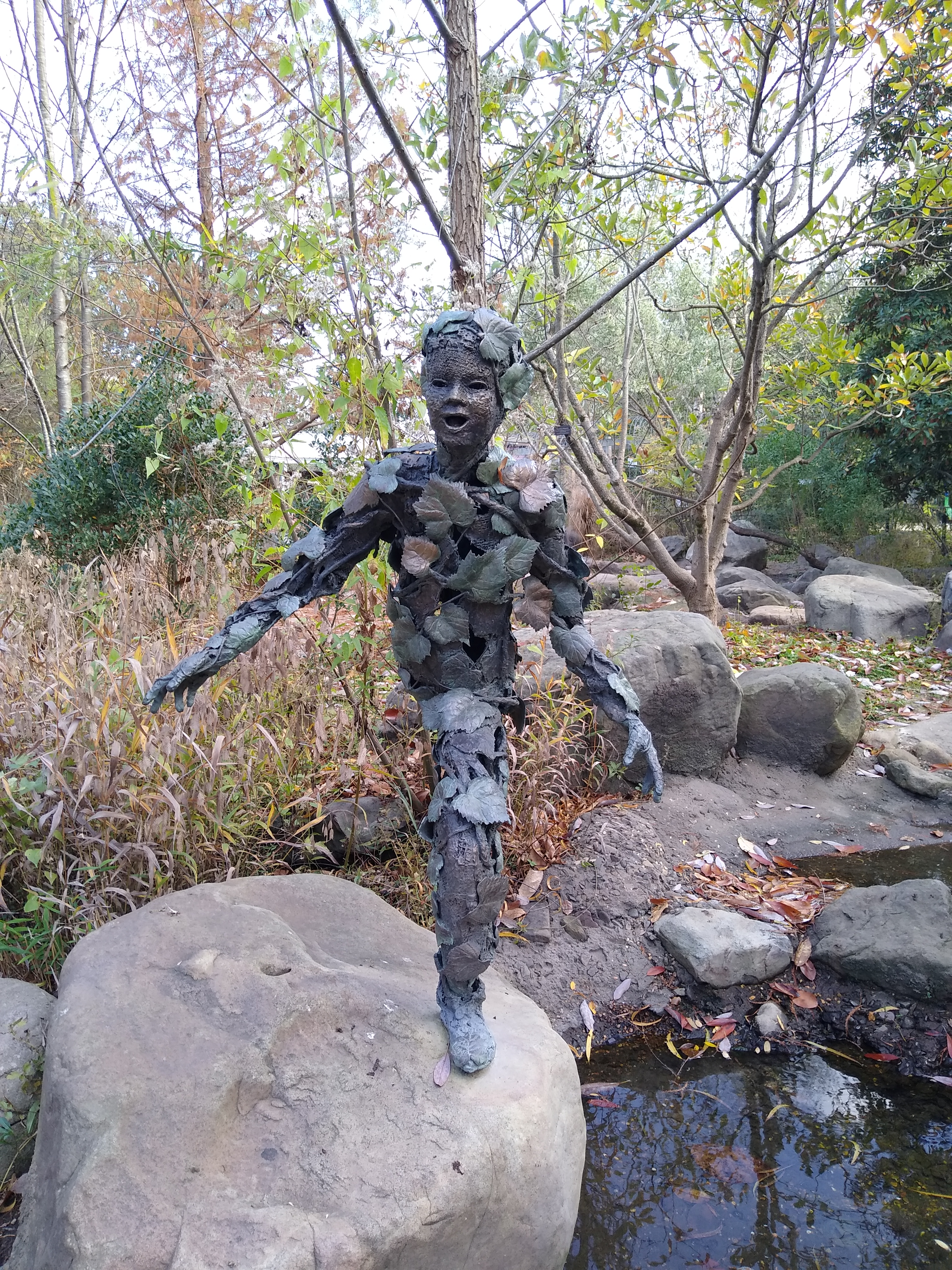
Statue of a child made of vines
