= H&R Block =

American tax preparation company

H&R Block, Inc.
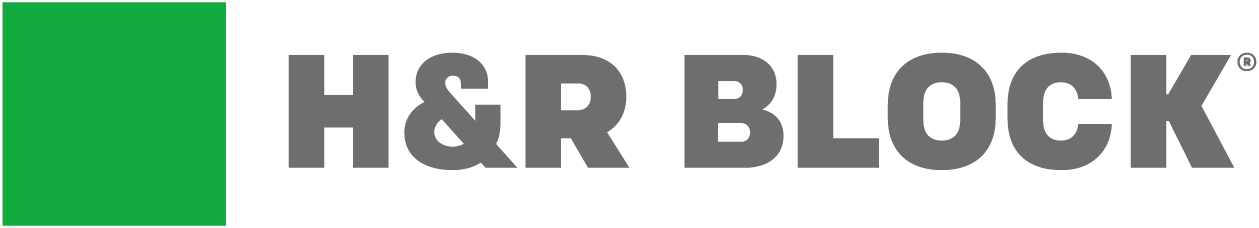

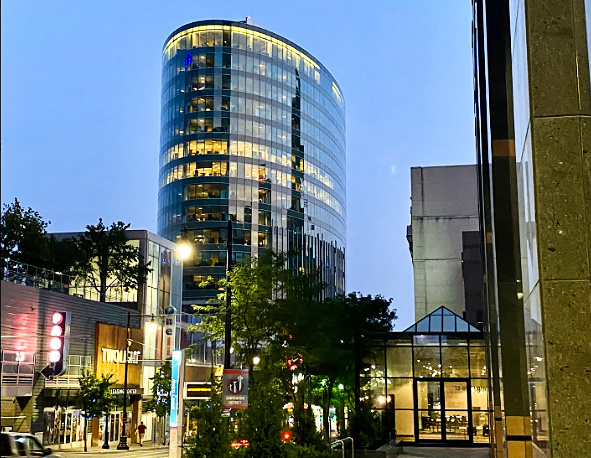
- Headquarters in Kansas City
- Type: Public
- Traded as: NYSE: HRB; S&P 400 component
- Founded: January 25, 1955; 71 years ago, in Kansas City, Missouri, U.S.
- Founder: Henry W. Bloch; Richard Bloch
- Headquarters: Kansas City, Missouri, U.S.
- Area served: United States; Canada; Australia; South Korea
- Key people: Robert A. Gerard; (chairman); Curtis Campbell; (president & CEO); Tiffany Mason; (CFO)
- Products: Tax preparation; Business services
- Revenue: ▲US$3.95 billion (2026)
- Net income: ▲US$734 million (2026)
- Number of employees: 4,200 (full-time; 2024); 70,900 (including seasonal)
- Website: hrblock.com

H&R Block, Inc., or H&R Block, is an American tax preparation company operating in Canada, the United States, South Korea and Australia. The company was founded in 1955 in Kansas City, Missouri, by brothers Henry W. Bloch and Richard Bloch.

As of 2018, H&R Block operates approximately 12,000 retail tax offices staffed by tax professionals worldwide. The company offers payroll, and business consulting services, consumer tax software, and online tax preparation/electronic filing from their website.

== History ==
=== Founding ===
During World War II, Henry W. Bloch was a young Army Air Forces navigator who wanted to start a family business with his brothers in Kansas City. Home from the war in 1946, Henry saw a pamphlet suggesting a bright future for companies serving small businesses, and it sparked his imagination. That year, Henry and his older brother, Leon, borrowed $5,000 and opened a small bookkeeping business on Main Street in downtown Kansas City. However, four months later, they had few clients and Leon decided to seek a law degree.

Henry wanted to keep trying with the fledgling business and placed a newspaper advertisement for help-wanted. He got an unexpected response—from his mother—who proposed that Henry hire his younger brother, Richard, for the job. Henry and Richard Bloch jointly ran their United Business Company, which focused on accounting, bookkeeping and payroll, but also did some income tax work for clients. The brothers took out an ad for its $5 tax services in The Kansas City Star newspaper in 1955. The ad was a success and H&R Block was born. The Bloch brothers chose to spell the name "Block" with a K to ensure the name was not mispronounced "blotch".

=== Expansion (1956–1980s) ===
In 1956, the Blochs decided to expand and picked New York City. Neither brother wanted to move to New York, so they agreed to sell that regional operation, creating the first H&R Block franchise tax office. In the following years, H&R Block grew and went public in 1962.

In 1980 H&R Block purchased the Compuserve online service. By 1986, Block was handling more than 10 million tax returns annually and had opened offices in Canada and Australia. That year, the company worked with the Internal Revenue Service to introduce electronic filing.

=== Recent history ===
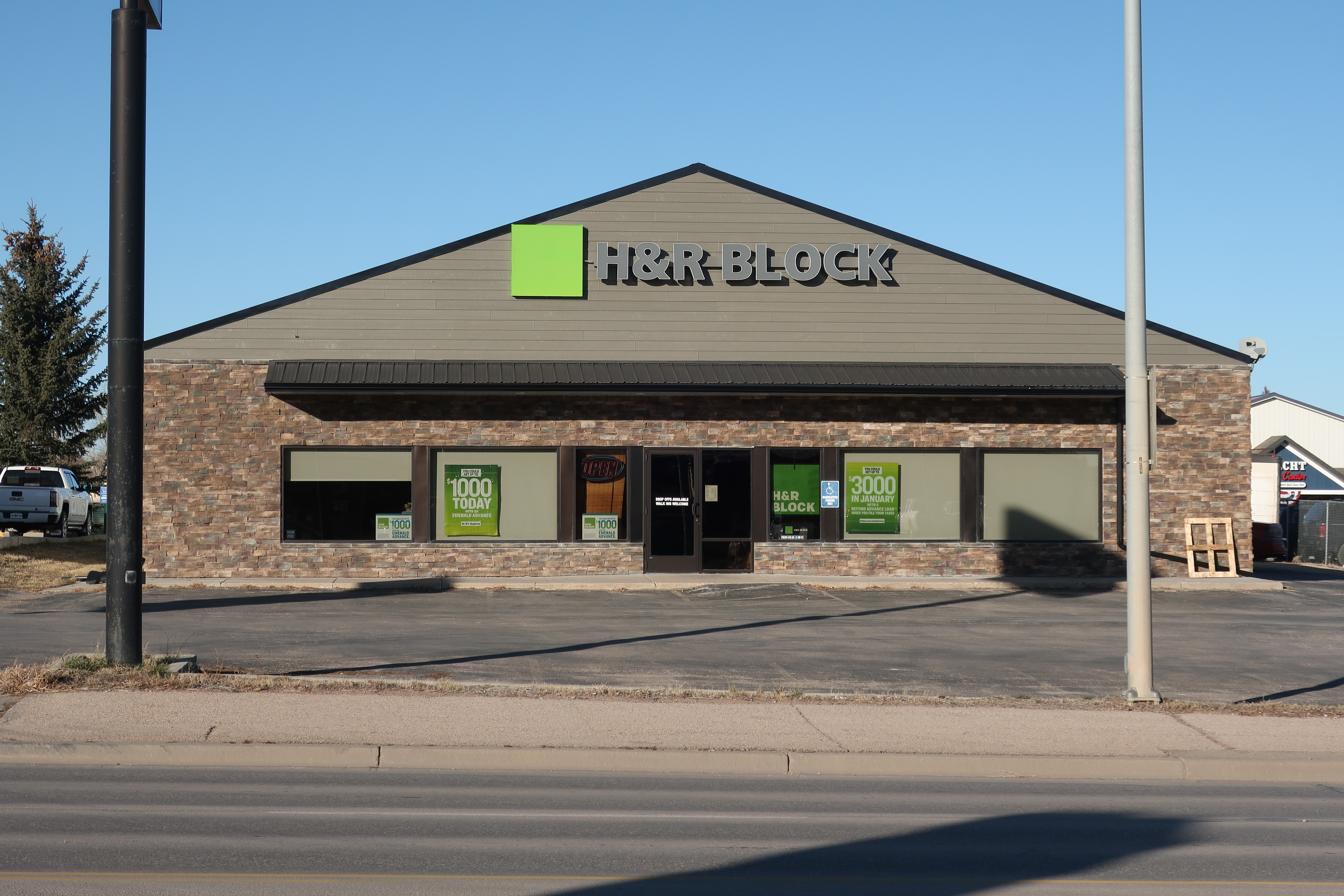
An H&R Block in Gillette, Wyoming

H&R Block acquired MECA Software, a 1980s PFM company that created the TaxCut software, in 1993. In 1995, H&R Block sold MECA, but retained TaxCut.

The company began to expand in the 1990s into the financial services arena, offering mortgage loans, banking and business services. H&R Block purchased Olde Discount Stockbrokers in 1999 and operated as a full-service securities broker-dealer under the name H&R Block Financial Advisors. In 2008, the company sold its H&R Block Financial Advisors unit to Ameriprise Financial for $315 million. At the time, the unit managed $30 billion in assets and employed 900 financial advisors in the U.S.

RSM McGladrey Business Solutions was created in 1999 when H&R Block acquired the assets of McGladrey & Pullen, aside from its auditors and attest services which remained under ownership of McGladrey's partners. Following the acquisition H&R Block became the sixth-largest accounting firm in the U.S. McGladrey had 100 offices in 25 states and offered accounting, consulting, tax services, and international business services to mid-sized companies. Through an alliance with McGladrey & Pullen and other accountancies, the Block subsidiary operated in 70 countries under the RSM International name. In 2011, H&R Block sold the unit back to McGladrey & Pullen.

H&R Block hired Jeff Jones, a former Target Corporation and Uber executive, as president and CEO on October 9, 2017. He replaced Tom Gerke, who was interim CEO following the retirement of former CEO Bill Cobb. Jones has said he sees H&R Block as a financial services company and a retail company, and aims to grow the company.

H&R Block started its first Global Technology Center in India in October 2017. This was created with the vision to grow H&R Block's Product Engineering and IT Solutions Development platforms. It is located in Technopark, Trivandrum, Kerala.

H&R Block announced in June 2019 that it would acquire Wave Financial, a Canadian financial technology company offering bookkeeping, accounting, and payroll services for small businesses. H&R Block acquired Wave for US$405 million (C$537 million). Wave operates as an independent subsidiary by Wave CEO Zahir Khoja from Toronto, Ontario.

=== Television ===
In 2010, H&R Block featured on the Ellen DeGeneres Show.

=== Controversies ===
==== H&R Block's own taxes 2005 ====
In August 2005, H&R Block announced that it had overstated its earnings for 2003 and 2004 by $91.1 million. The company stated that it had "insufficient resources" to identify and report complex transactions in its corporate tax accounting. On February 23, 2006, the company said in its quarterly results that it had miscalculated its own state income taxes for 2005 and 2004, and that it owed an additional $32 million in back taxes.

==== Social Security numbers 2005 ====
In December 2005, H&R Block sent its customers free copies of its TaxCut software, and the mailing labels on the packages mistakenly included the recipients' Social Security numbers. The company said it sent the promotional mailing to former customers and people whose names were taken from purchased lists. It said it is legally required to hold on to customers' tax information, including Social Security numbers, for three years. H&R Block said no customer data has been lost or stolen as a result of the mistake, and that less than 3 percent of the mailings were involved.

==== Refund anticipation loans 2006 ====
California Attorney General Bill Lockyer sued H&R Block in February 2006, alleging the company's refund anticipation loan (RAL) business violated state and federal laws in its marketing and providing of high-cost RALs mainly to low-income clients. The lawsuit also alleged H&R Block received a "substantial portion of the loan fees", in some cases purchasing up to 49.9 percent of the loans, and further alleged that H&R Block at times held onto a customer's tax refund for purposes of paying off RAL-related debt from previous years, including that claimed by other banks or tax preparers. The complaint stated, "Therefore, Block clients who are claimed to owe debt from a prior year are led to expect a loan, but instead find themselves in a collection proceeding."

The company responded that it "believes the refund lending program is both fair and legal, and will vigorously defend against the complaint". On January 2, 2009, California Attorney General Edmund G. Brown Jr. reached a $4.85 million settlement with H&R Block, which prohibits the company from deceptively marketing high-cost refund anticipation loans as early "tax refunds". The company set aside $2.45 million in restitution for customers if they purchased a "refund anticipation loan" or a "refund anticipation check" through H&R Block between January 1, 2001 and December 31, 2008. In addition, H&R Block agreed to pay $500,000 in penalties and $1.9 million in fees and costs. In 2011, H&R Block ceased offering RALs altogether, a move praised by consumer rights activists.

==== Express IRA 2006 ====
On March 16, 2006, New York Attorney General Eliot Spitzer sued H&R Block, accusing the company of deceptive marketing of its Express IRA retirement accounts. The lawsuit alleged the company assessed fees, including set-up fees, annual fees, and account closing fees that, for 85% of account holders, resulted in the account losing money. However, in July 2007, a New York state judge dismissed much of the lawsuit. Justice Karla Moskowitz of the State Supreme Court excused Block and five of its units from the lawsuit. She let stand the portion of the complaint concerning another unit, H&R Block Financial Advisers, but dismissed allegations of common law fraud. At the time of the ruling, H&R Block said it believed the remaining assertions lacked merit and that it would appeal. On January 6, 2009, a New York state appeals court overruled trial justice Karla Moskowitz's July 2007 ruling and reinstated the lawsuit against H&R Block Inc that accused the company of fraudulently marketing Express IRA retirement accounts to hundreds of thousands of lower-income clients nationwide. The matter was settled in 2009, and H&R Block agreed to pay $11.4 million to $19.4 million of fees to customers and $750,000 in fees and other costs.

== Corporate affairs ==
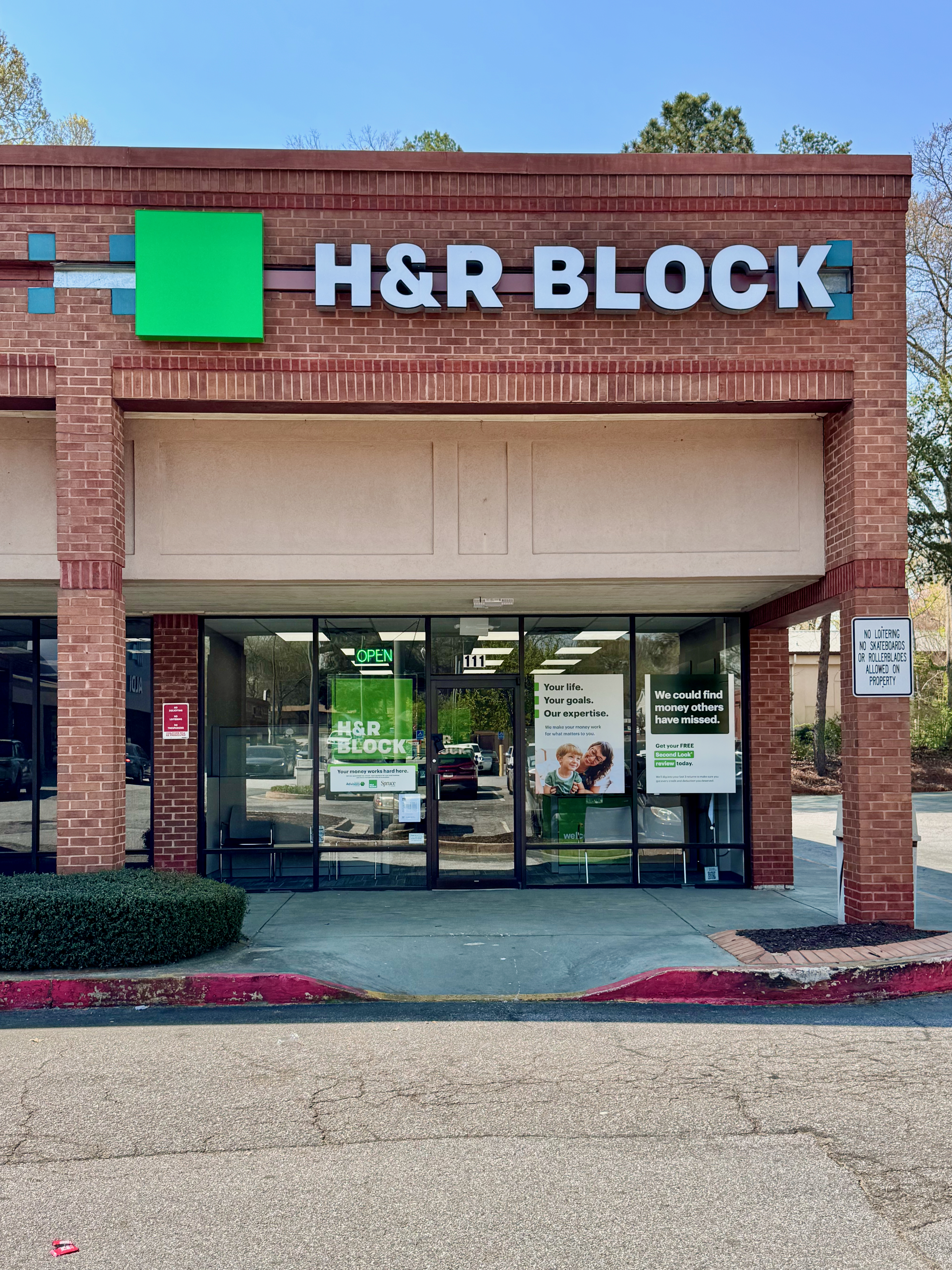
H&R Block tax office in Athens, Georgia

H&R Block is a company headquartered in Kansas City, Missouri, governed by an 11-member board of directors and led by CEO Jeff Jones and CFO Tony Bowen. It employs around 2,700 regular full-time employees and up to 90,700 seasonal employees, generating over $3 billion in revenue annually. It also runs The Tax Institute at H&R Block.

=== Marketing ===
H&R Block has undertaken several high-profile marketing campaigns featuring celebrities such as Jon Hamm and Anthony Davis, with the most recent campaign during the 2017 Super Bowl featuring IBM Watson at its retail locations. In 2024, the company launched the spoof miniseries "responsibility island", combining taxes and reality TV. The company stated its goal was to attract new customers from Generation Z.

=== Corporate social responsibility ===
The company partners with Military One Source, which lets members of the military service file for free.

As part of its corporate social responsibility initiatives, in 2014 H&R Block launched an online game for high school students called the Budget Challenge. The challenge was part of the company's Dollars & Sense financial literacy effort and offered college scholarships up to 2019 for teenage students who won the games.

== Business areas ==
=== Retail and digital tax services ===
H&R Block has 70,000 employees in its 10,000 U.S. retail tax offices. In addition to the company's traditional retail tax offices, it offers digital tax preparation programs and software. It filed 23 million tax returns worldwide in 2016.

The company's services Tax Pro Review and Tax Pro Go were launched in 2017. Tax Pro Review is an updated version of its former service Best of Both, where clients enter their information and do their returns online and are matched with Block tax professional reviews for help. H&R Block Tax Pro Go is marketed to online filers who do not want to or cannot visit an H&R Block office.

H&R Block's tax software comes in different versions. In addition to the free edition, there are Deluxe, Premium and Self-Employed editions. Users can log on using various devices, import photos of their W-2 forms and use a searchable knowledge base. The Deluxe and Premium editions include free online chat with a tax professional.

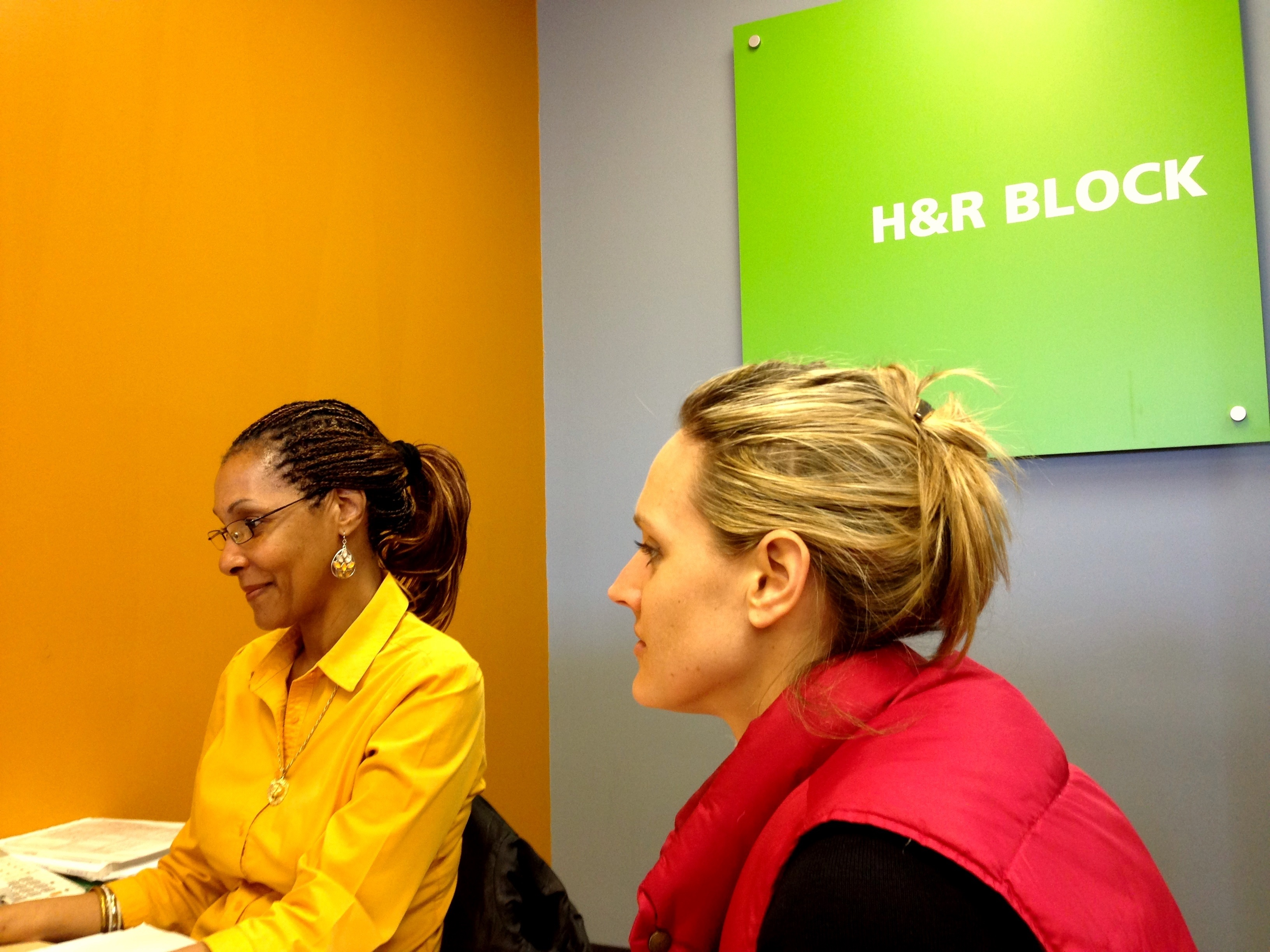
H&R Block Tax Service – March 2013

=== Block Advisors ===
In January 2016, H&R Block launched Block Advisors, a service that provides year-round consumer tax preparation. The company has opened about 350 Block Advisor offices. Its advisors include certified public accountants, enrolled agents, or have been certified by H&R Block as master tax advisors.

=== Partnerships ===
In 2014, the company formed a strategic alliance with Xero. As part of this alliance, H&R Block will exclusively promote Xero as its preferred small business online accounting solution. H&R Block has 11,000 branded locations nationwide, and will recommend Xero in the locations that sell H&R Block's Small Business Program suite of services.

The company signed a deal with Walmart in 2018, to make H&R Block software the only desktop tax preparation software sold at the retailer's stores. H&R Block also created a deal with Amazon.com in 2017 for better product placement of its suite of software products.

In 2017, H&R Block partnered with IBM to bring IBM Watson technology into its retail offices. Under the partnership, H&R Block tax pros received access to IBM's artificial intelligence system to help tax pros prepare better tax returns for clients.

In 2018, H&R Block partnered with LendingTree to allow customers credit score access via MyBlock.

As of 2022, H&R Block's tax preparation service shares user data with Facebook, which can be used for targeted advertising. This can include sensitive financial information from health savings accounts and college expenses, and this tax data is shared without consent even for users who opt out of the service.

=== Other products and services ===
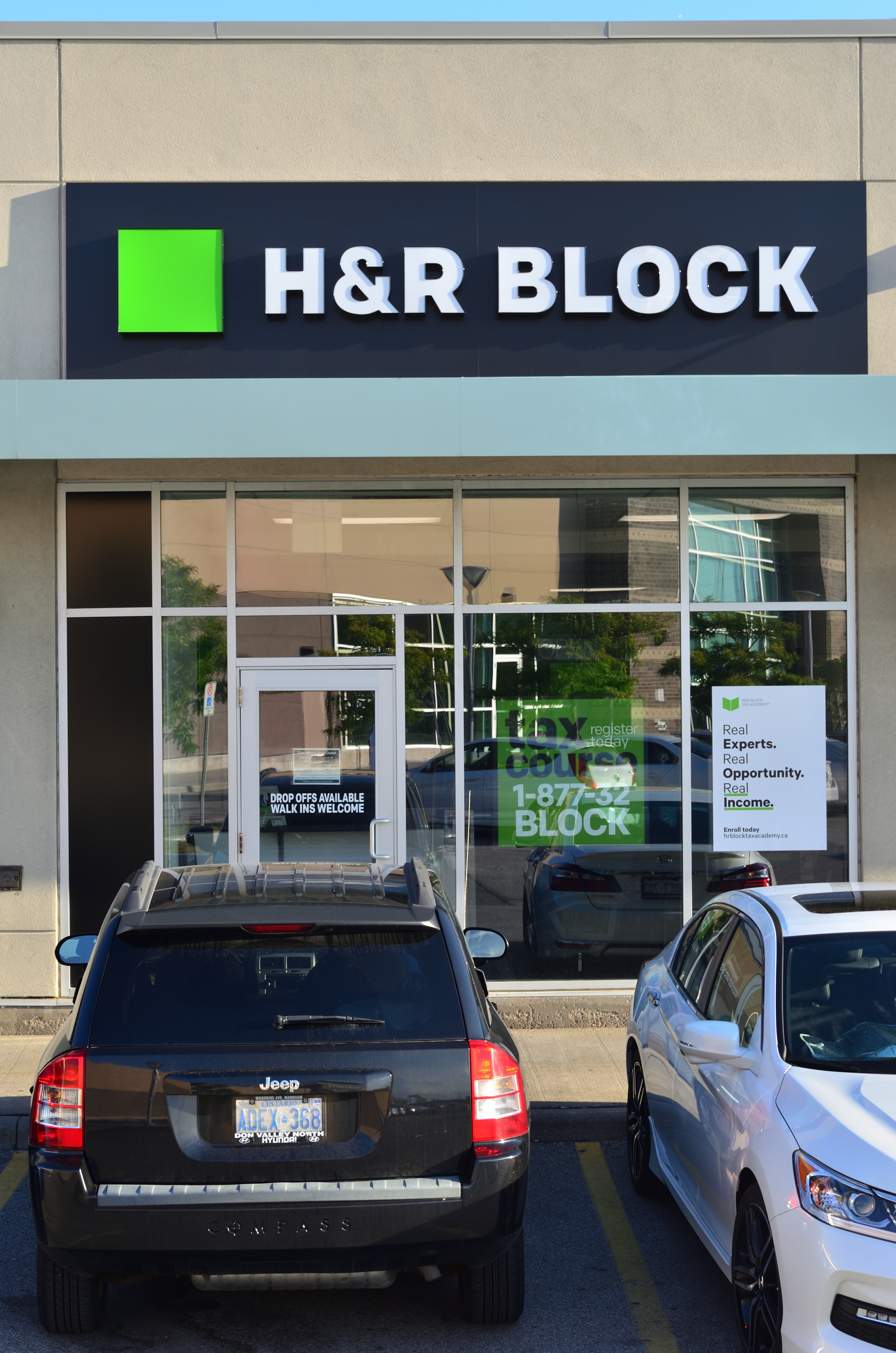
H&R Block office in Ontario

Following research on the potential expat market in 2013, H&R Block began its Expat Tax Services program to offer tax advice to U.S. citizens living outside the country.

H&R Block maintains financial services products, including the Emerald Card pre-paid debit card and Emerald Advance line of credit. Additionally, the company's Tax Identity Shield offers identity theft protection.

=== H&R Block Bank ===
H&R Block Bank was chartered in 2006. In September 2015, it was sold to Axos Financial, which serviced Emerald cards until 2020.
