= Bakersfield Department of Recreation and Parks =

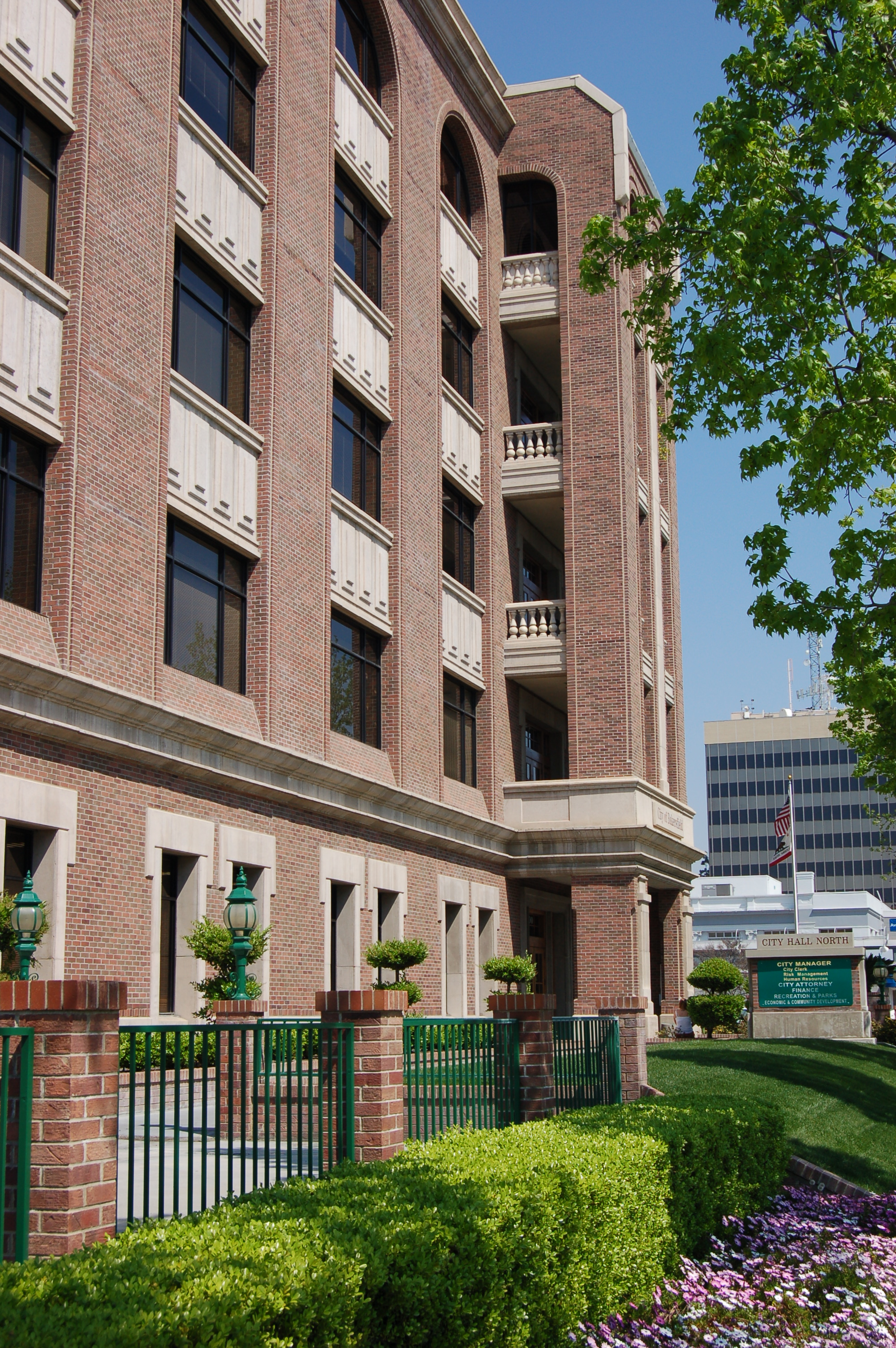
- Department Headquarters

Agency overview
- Formed: 1908
- Jurisdiction: Bakersfield, California
- Headquarters: City Hall North
- Annual budget: $16 million (2009-10)
- Agency executive: Rick Anthony, Recreation and Parks Director
- Website: bakersfieldparks.us/

The Department of Recreation and Parks is a department of the city of Bakersfield, California. It is responsible for the maintenance of the city's lands which include: parks, natural preserves, and streetscapes. It also runs recreational programs throughout the year at various locations throughout the city. The department also runs the Bakersfield Ice Sports Center and McMurtrey Aquatic Center. Although there are incorporated areas in the northwest, the city does not have any parks in that region. They are instead maintained by the North of the River Recreation and Parks District. The department has been accredited by the Commission for Accreditation of Park and Recreation Agencies.

== History ==
The department was founded in 1908. That year, Truxtun Beale donated the land and finances for the development of the city's first park, which was named Beale Park. The departments role was simple, to provide maintenance for the city's parks. Two more parks would be donated, before the first park was constructed on land purchased by the city, which was Jefferson Park in East Bakersfield. By 1940, the city would have five parks.

In 1964, a community center was constructed in Central Park. It would be the first item for the department to manage that was not a park. Also, starting in the 1960s was a requirement that developers plan a set amount of park space per acre developed. With the large population growth that started in the early 1970s, the amount of land that needed maintenance would also greatly increase. Also, with the purchase of assets from Tenneco West in 1976, would create the largest park in the city, the Kern River Parkway. The parkway would initially start at 2,900 acres and would eventually grow to over 6,000 acres.

Starting in the 1990s the department would see another area of responsibility grow. The city started requiring developers to landscape major arterials adjacent to their developments. Also, streetscape projects downtown would result in more landscaping that needed to be maintained.
