= Richard Bloch =

American businessman (1926–2004)

- Born: Richard Adolf Bloch; February 15, 1926; Kansas City, Missouri, U.S.
- Died: July 21, 2004 (aged 78); Kansas City, Missouri, U.S.
- Education: University of Pennsylvania
- Occupation: Businessman
- Known for: Co-founder of H&R Block
- Spouse: Annette Modell
- Children: 3
- Relatives: Henry W. Bloch (brother)

Richard Adolf Bloch (February 15, 1926 – July 21, 2004) was an American entrepreneur, and philanthropist best known for starting the H&R Block tax preparation and personal finance company with his older brother Henry in 1955. His personal experience with cancer led him to invest in helping others fight and overcome the disease.

== Early life and education ==
Bloch was born to a Jewish family in Kansas City, the son of Hortense (Bienenstock) and Leon Bloch. In the 4th grade, Bloch found a hand press in his uncle's attic and began his first business as a printer. By the time he was 12, he had three automatic presses and was providing printing services to several Kansas City high schools. He sold his business to an Iowa college to use as a print course teaching model.

When he was 16, he entered the Wharton School (part of the University of Pennsylvania). In college Bloch was a member of Zeta Beta Tau, the campus' Jewish fraternity. The youngest member of his class, he received a Bachelor of Science degree in economics in 1945. He helped pay his college expenses by purchasing used cars, repairing them and selling them for a profit.

== Founding H. & R. Block ==
Bloch returned to Kansas City after graduating, married his wife, Annette, and began working in the municipal bond business. Around the same time, his brothers Henry and Leon launched the United Business Co. bookkeeping business. His brothers asked him to come aboard as an accountant.

Bloch left the business for about a year in 1953 to become a retail jewelry efficiency expert. While stranded on a San Francisco business trip, he realized his family in Kansas City was a top priority and returned. Soon after, Leon left the bookkeeping business to pursue a career as an attorney.

In 1955, Henry and Richard Bloch renamed the business H&R Block, changing the spelling to avoid mispronunciation, and focused on tax preparation services. While Henry managed the company in Kansas City, Richard concentrated on nationwide expansion. By 1969, he shifted his efforts overseas while Henry took charge of the company's domestic business.

== Cancer ==
Bloch was diagnosed with terminal lung cancer in 1978, and told he had three months to live. He refused to accept the prognosis, and sought treatment at the M.D. Anderson Center in Houston, Texas. After two years of aggressive therapy, his cancer went into remission. By 1980, he was focusing his energies on funding cancer research, and in 1982 he sold his interest in H&R Block.

Richard and Annette Bloch founded the Cancer Hotline in 1980 to educate newly diagnosed cancer patients, and their friends and families about available treatment resources. Later, they founded the R. A. Bloch Cancer Management Center and the R. A. Bloch Cancer Support Center at the University of Missouri–Kansas City. Ronald Reagan appointed him to a six-year term with the National Cancer Advisory Board in 1982. He was a member of the President's Circle of the National Academy of Sciences, the Institute of Medicine, and the National Institutes of Health Office of Alternative Medicine. He also received the 1994 American Society of Clinical Oncology's Public Service Award and the 1995 Layman's Award from the Society of Surgical Oncology.

In the late 1980s, Bloch was diagnosed with colon cancer, which was also successfully treated.

== Death ==
Bloch died of heart failure on July 21, 2004, at the age of 78. He was survived by his wife, Annette (née Modell), daughters Linda Lyon, Barbara Stanny, and Nancy Linsely and ten grandchildren.

== Bibliography ==
Co-written with his wife:

- Cancer... There's Hope (1981) ISBN 0-399-12814-X (1983 edition)
- Fighting Cancer: A Step-by-Step Guide to Helping Yourself Fight Cancer (1985) OCLC 319004046
- Guide for Cancer Supporters: Step-by-step Ways to Help a Relative or Friend Fight Cancer (1992) OCLC 25561085
