= Bakersfield, California =

- City
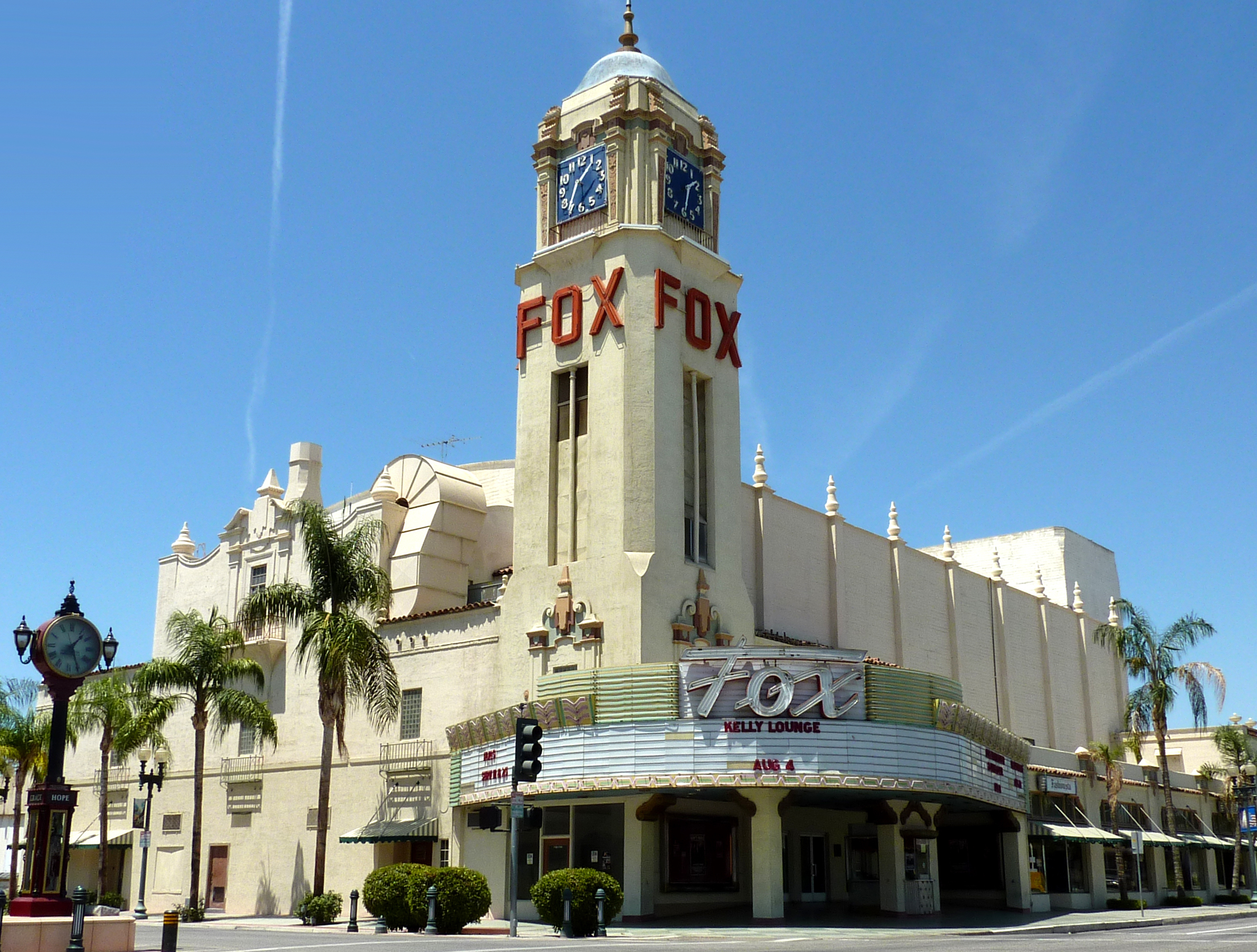
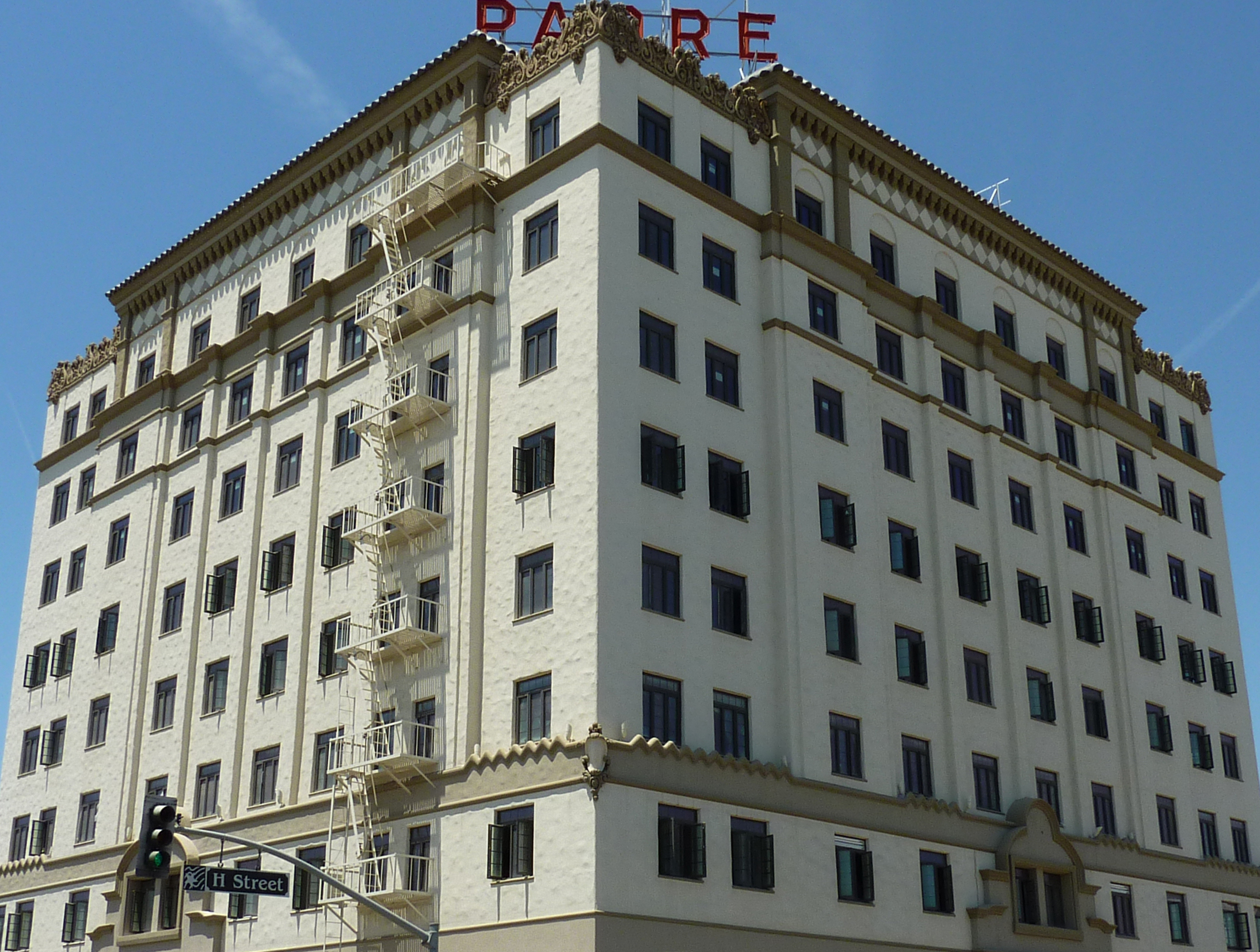
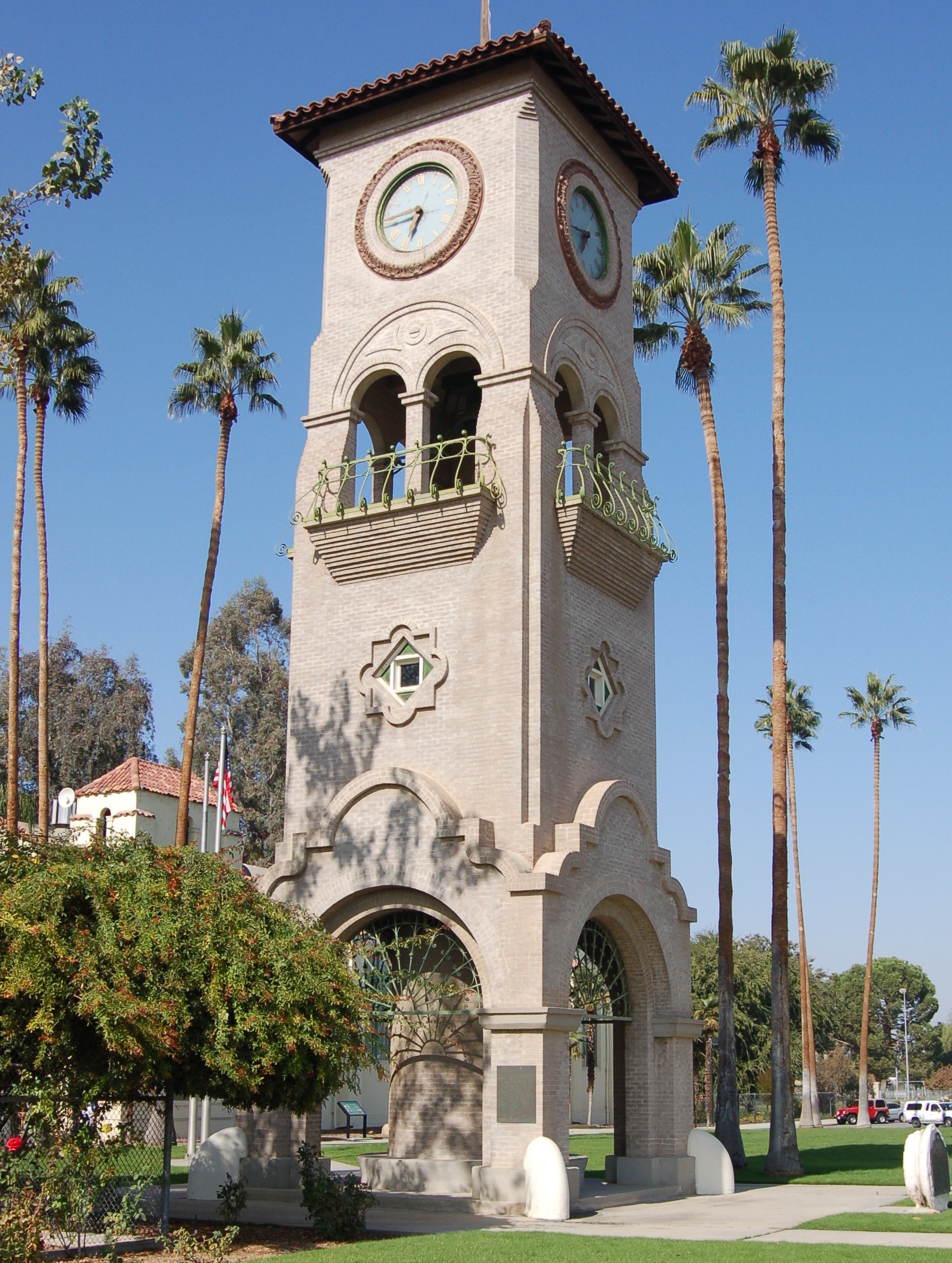
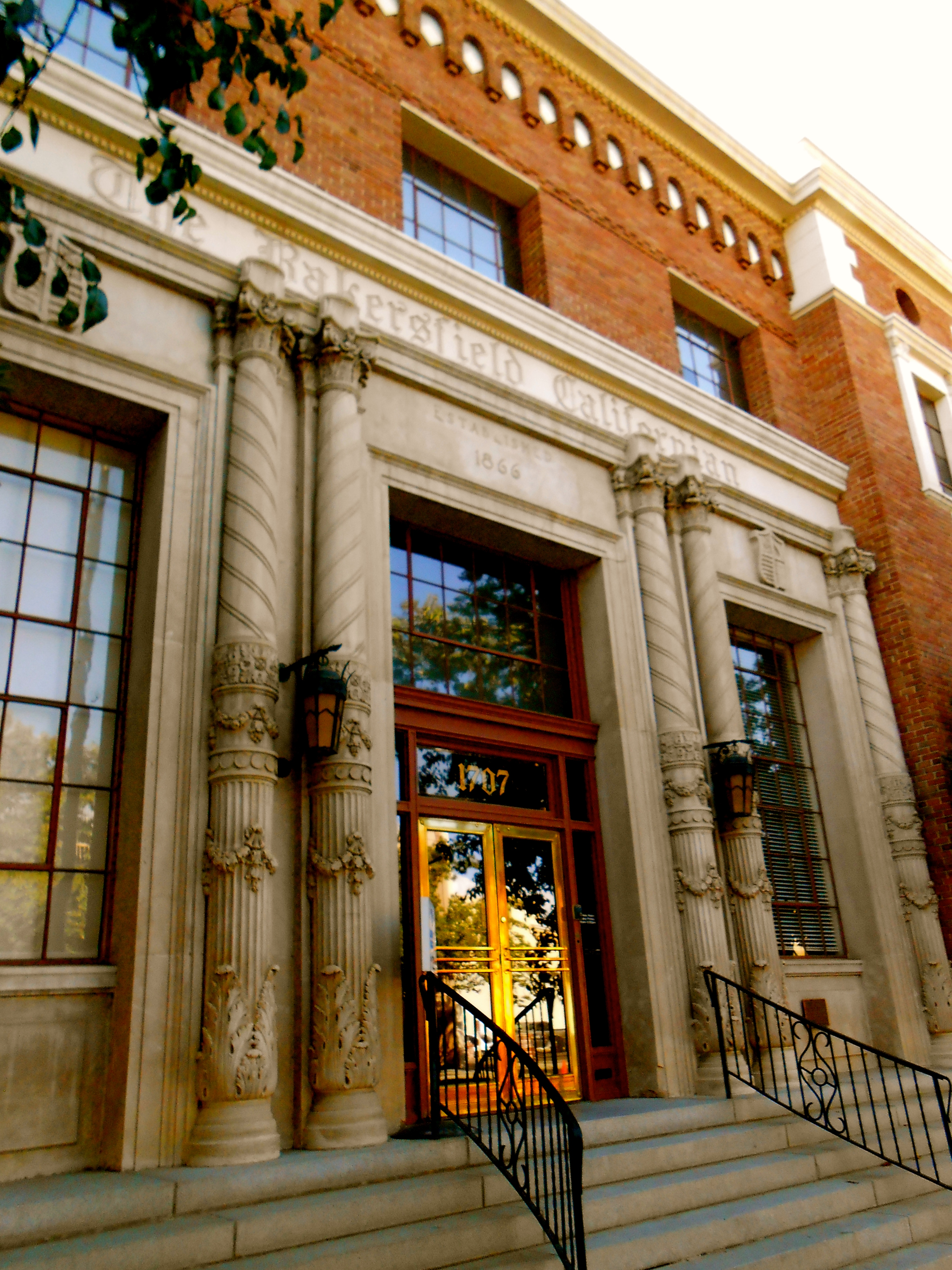
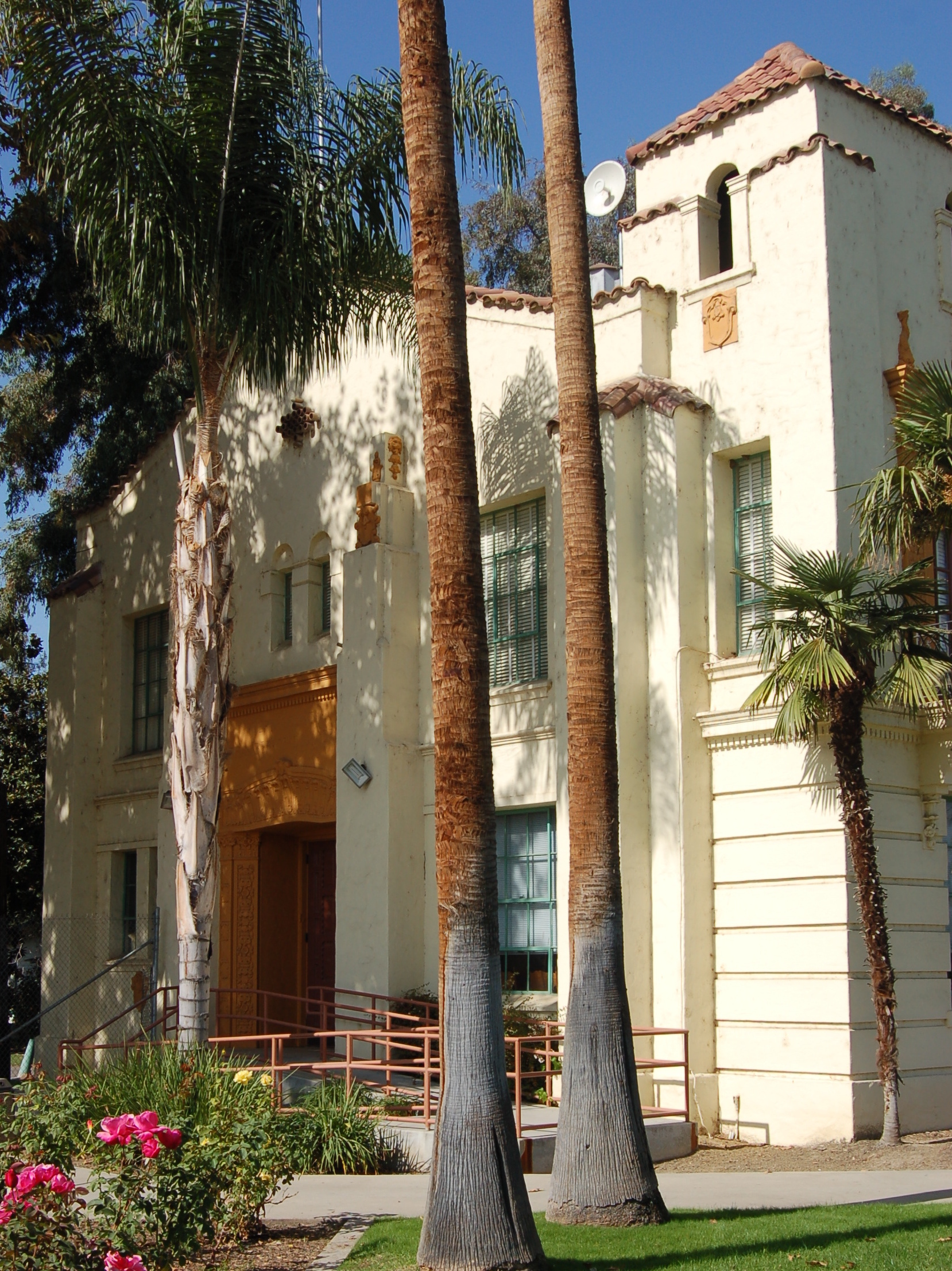
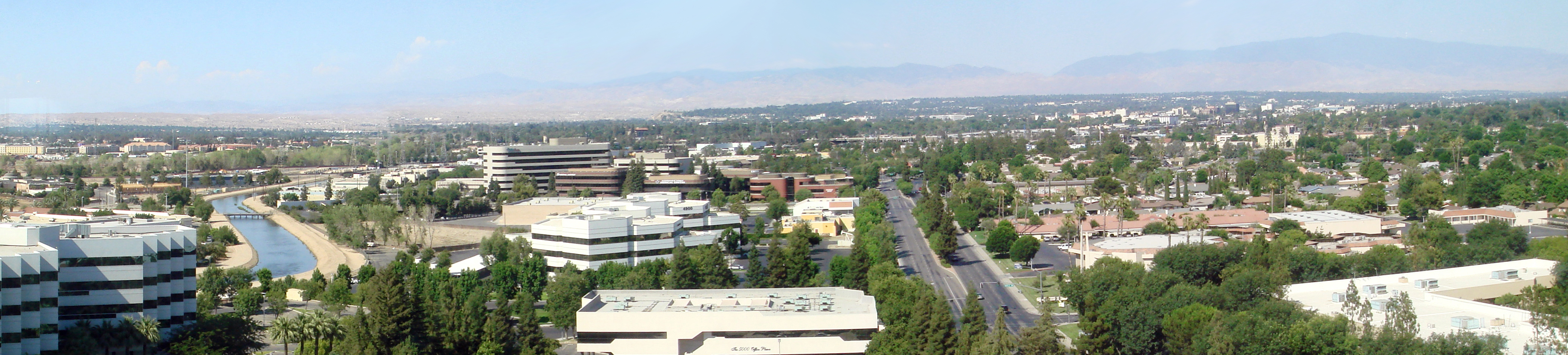
- Fox Theater Padre Hotel Beale Memorial Clock Tower Bakersfield Californian Building Kern County Museum Aerial view of Central Bakersfield

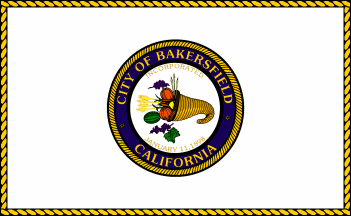
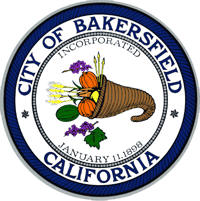
- Flag Seal
- Nicknames: "Bako", "Nashville West"
- Interactive map of Bakersfield, California
- Location within California Location within the United States Location within North America
- Coordinates: 35°22′24″N 119°01′08″W
- Country: United States
- State: California
- County: Kern
- Region: San Joaquin Valley
- Incorporated: 1873–1876
- Re-incorporated: January 11, 1898
- Named for: Thomas Baker

Government
  - Type: Council-Manager
  - Body: Bakersfield City Council
  - Mayor: Karen K. Goh
  - Vice Mayor: Manpreet Kaur

Area
  - City: 151.27 sq mi (391.80 km^{2})
  - Land: 149.81 sq mi (388.01 km^{2})
  - Water: 1.46 sq mi (3.79 km^{2})
- Elevation: 404 ft (123 m)

Population (2020)
  - City: 403,455
  - Estimate (2025): ▲422,165
  - Rank: 47th in the United States; 9th in California
  - Density: 2,693.1/sq mi (1,039.8/km^{2})
  - Urban: 570,235 (US: 76th)
  - Urban density: 4,316/sq mi (1,666.4/km^{2})
  - Metro: 909,235 (US: 62nd)
- Demonym(s): Bakersfieldian, Bakersfield Californian, or Baker
- Time zone: UTC−8 (Pacific)
  - Summer (DST): UTC−7 (PDT)
- ZIP codes: 93220, 93301–93309, 93311–93314, 93380–93390, 93399
- Area code: 661
- FIPS code: 06-03526
- GNIS feature IDs: 1652668, 2409774
- Website: bakersfieldcity.us

Bakersfield is a city in and the county seat of Kern County, California, United States. The city covers about 151 sq mi (390 km^{2}) near the southern end of the San Joaquin Valley, which is located in the Central Valley region.

Bakersfield's population in the 2020 Census was 403,455, making it the 47th-most populous city in the United States and the 9th-most populous in California. The Bakersfield–Delano Metropolitan Statistical Area, which includes all of Kern County, had a 2020 census population of 909,235, making it the 62nd largest metropolitan area in the United States.

Bakersfield is a significant hub for both agriculture and energy production. Kern County is California's most productive oil-producing county and the fourth most productive agricultural county by value in the United States. Industries in and around Bakersfield include natural gas and other energy extraction, mining, petroleum refining, distribution, food processing, and corporate regional offices. The city is the birthplace of the country music genre known as the Bakersfield sound.

== History ==
Yowlumne territory at the time of the arrival of the Spanish

Archaeological evidence indicates the presence of Native American settlements dating back thousands of years. Upon Spanish arrival, present-day Bakersfield was inhabited by the Yowlumne, a Yokuts people. Yowlumne accounts indicate that the village of Woilu was situated in the bounds of the present city.

The Yokuts of the region lived in lodges along the branches of the Kern River delta and hunted antelope, tule elk, deer, bear, fish, and game birds.

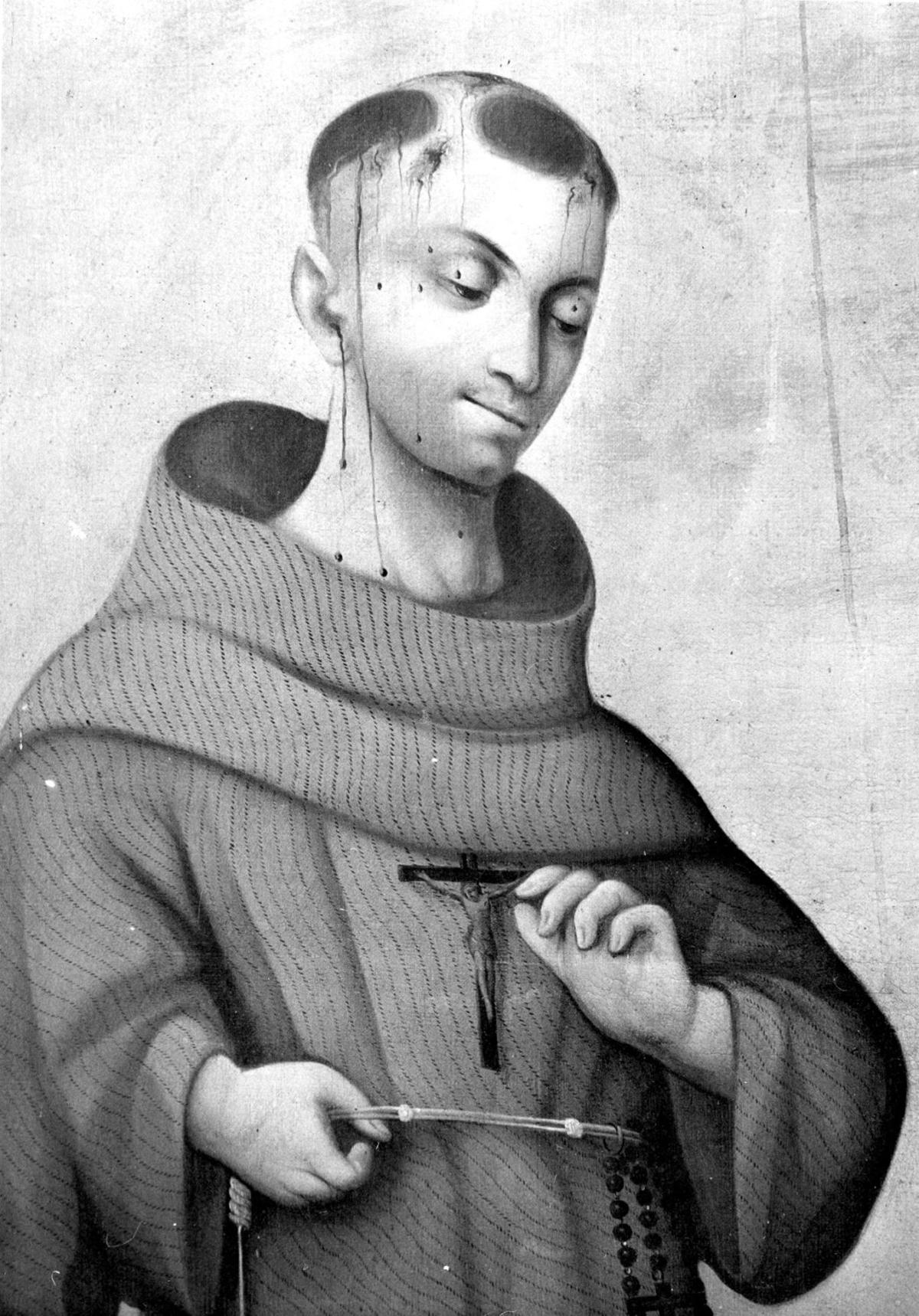
Spanish priest Francisco Garcés arrived in the Bakersfield area in 1776.

In 1776, Spanish missionary Francisco Garcés became the first European to explore the area. Recording his May 1 arrival to a Yokuts village along the Kern River, immediately northeast of present Bakersfield, Garcés wrote,

The people of the rancheria had a great feast over my arrival, and having regaled me well I reciprocated to them all with tobacco and glass beads, congratulating myself on seeing the people so affable and affectionate.

Given the remoteness and inaccessibility of the region, the Yokuts remained largely isolated from further contact until after the Mexican War of Independence, when Mexican settlers began to migrate to the area. Following the discovery of gold in California in 1848, settlers flooded into the San Joaquin Valley. In 1851, gold was discovered along the Kern River in the southern Sierra Nevada, and in 1865, oil was discovered in the valley. The Bakersfield area, once a tule reed-covered marshland, was first known as Kern Island to the handful of pioneers, who built log cabins there in 1860. The area was subject to periodic flooding from the Kern River, which occupied what is now the downtown area, and experienced outbreaks of malaria.

Bakersfield is the fifth-largest majority-Hispanic city in the United States, with 53% of its population being Hispanic in 2020.

=== Founding ===
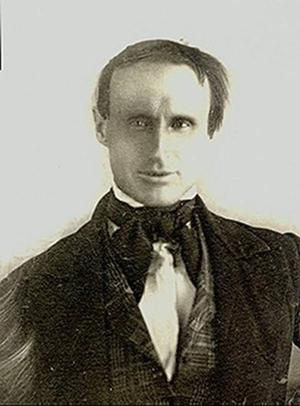
Bakersfield is named after Thomas Baker, who came to the area in 1863.

In 1861, disastrous floods swept away the original settlement founded in 1860 by the German-born Christian Bohna. Among those attracted to the area by the California gold rush was Thomas Baker, a lawyer and former colonel in the militia of Ohio, his home state. Baker moved to the banks of the Kern River in 1863, at what became known as Baker's Field, which became a stopover for travelers. By 1870, with a population of 600, what is now known as Bakersfield was becoming the principal town in Kern County.

In 1873, Bakersfield was officially incorporated as a city. In 1874, it replaced the town of Havilah as the county seat. Alexander Mills was hired as the city marshal, a man one historian described as "... an old man by the time he became Marshal of Bakersfield, and he walked with a cane. But he was a Kentuckian, a handy man with a gun, and not lacking in initiative and resource when the mood moved him."

Businessmen and others began to resent Mills, who was cantankerous and high-handed in his treatment of them. Wanting to fire him but fearing reprisals, they devised a scheme to disincorporate, effectively leaving him without an employer. According to local historian Gilbert Gia the city was also failing to collect the taxes it needed for services. In 1876, The city voted to disincorporate. For the next 22 years, a citizen's council managed the community.

By 1880, Bakersfield had a population of 801, with 250 of Chinese descent.

By 1890, it had a population of 2,626. Migration from Texas, Louisiana, Oklahoma, and Southern California brought new residents, who were mostly employed by the oil industry.

The city reincorporated on January 11, 1898.

=== Establishment of rail connection ===
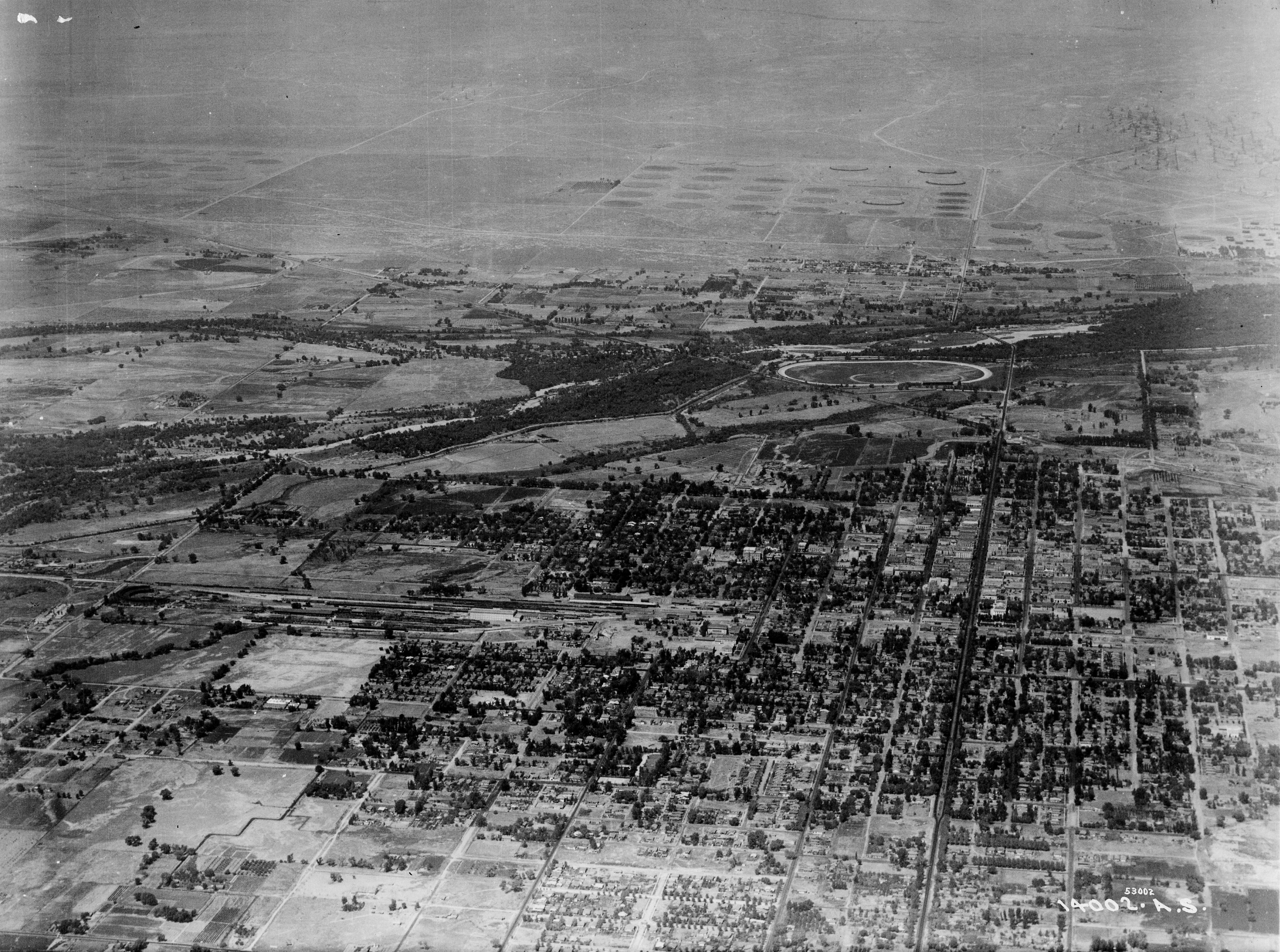
An aerial view of Bakersfield in 1925

In 1874, the Southern Pacific Railroad first arrived in Kern County. However, the train depot was placed nearly three miles east of Bakersfield due to a land dispute between the railroad and the town.

Desperate to get their own station, Bakersfield residents, sugar magnate Clause Spreckels, and small investors from all over the state ended up raising around $3,500,000 by January 17, 1895, to fund a second railroad to Bakersfield. By January 29, 1895, the San Francisco and San Joaquin Valley Railroad was born. Dubbed the "People's Railroad," the project was completed and warmly welcomed by the town with a parade attended by thousands on May 27, 1898, amidst the Spanish-American War and over 20 years after the completion of Southern Pacific's line. Competition from the new railroad caused Southern Pacific to lower its fares from $9.10 ($347.22 in 2023) to $6.90 ($263.27 in 2023) to match the new railroad's fare.

Eventually, a streetcar line would connect the Santa Fe station to the Southern Pacific station in Sumner (now East Bakersfield).

However, while the track had reached Bakersfield in 1898, a station would not be constructed until 1899 due to the San Francisco and San Joaquin Valley Railroad being purchased by Atchison, Topeka, and Santa Fe. The new station was located at the intersection of 15th Street and F Street and was demolished in 1972. It was replaced with the present day Bakersfield Station built in 2000, near Truxtun Avenue and S Street.

=== 1952 earthquake ===
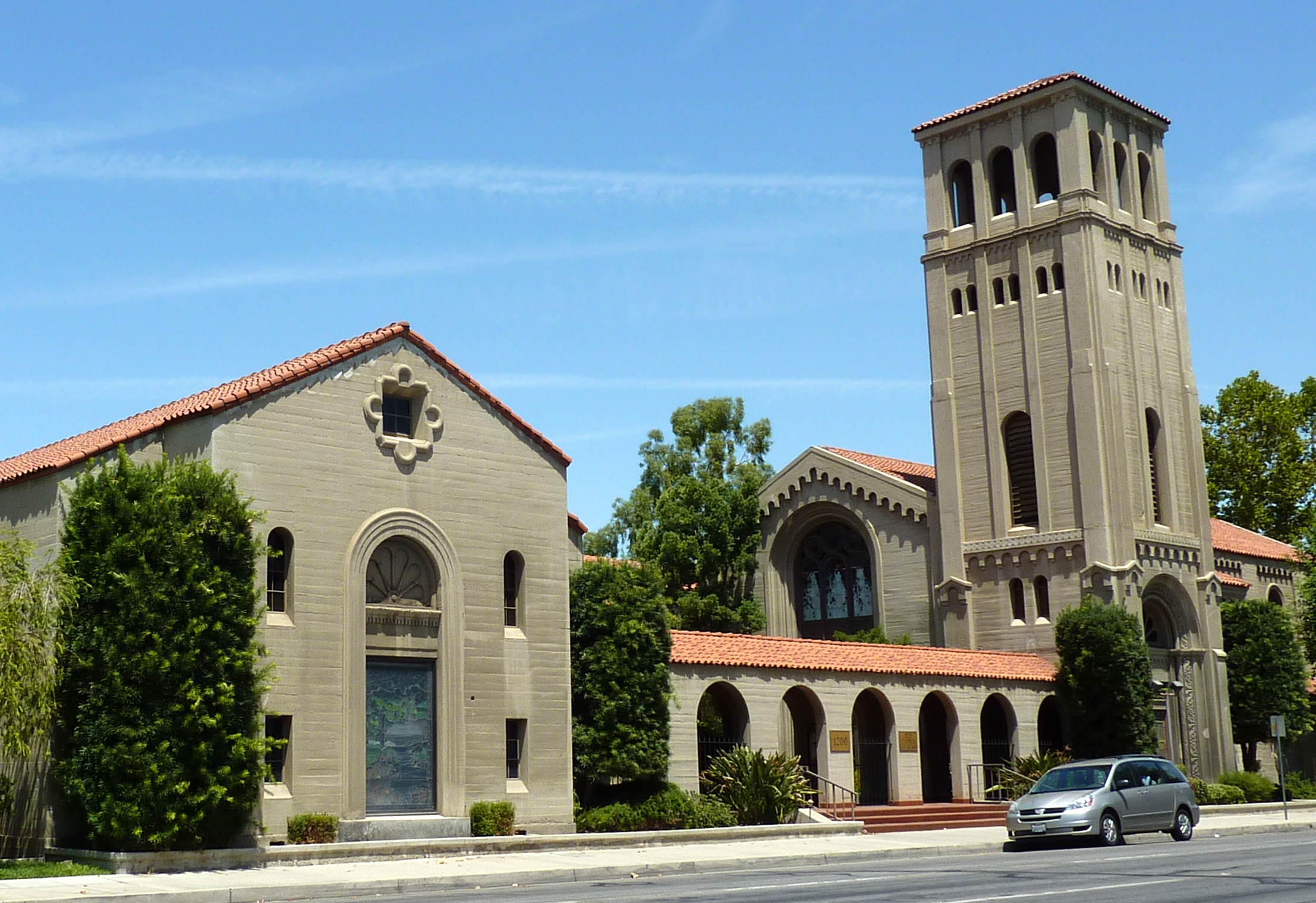
The First Baptist Church, built in 1931 in a Spanish Colonial Revival style, is listed on the National Register of Historic Places.

On July 21, 1952, an earthquake struck at 4:52 am Pacific Daylight Time. The earthquake, which measured 7.5 on the moment magnitude scale and was felt from San Francisco to the Mexican border, destroyed the nearby communities of Tehachapi and Arvin. The earthquake's destructive force bent cotton fields into U shapes, slid a shoulder of the Tehachapi Mountains across all four lanes of the Ridge Route, collapsed a water tower, creating a flash flood, and destroyed the railroad tunnels in the mountain chain. Bakersfield was somewhat spared, experiencing minor architectural damage without loss of life.

A large aftershock occurred on July 29, causing minor architectural damage but raising fears that the flow of the Friant-Kern Canal could be dangerously altered, potentially flooding the city and surrounding areas.

The historic Spanish Baroque Revival style Fox Theater, built in 1930

Aftershocks continued for the next month, and on August 22 at 3:42 pm, another earthquake, measured at 5.8, struck directly under the city's center in the most densely populated area of the southern San Joaquin Valley. Four people died in the aftershock, and many of the town's historic structures sustained heavy damage. St Francis Church was damaged by the 1952 earthquake and was reconstructed after that damage. Now, in 2026, it is being renovated.

=== 1970 to 2010 ===
Between 1970 and 2010, Bakersfield grew 400% (from 70,000 to 347,483), making it one of the fastest-growing cities in California.

Bakersfield's close proximity to mountain passes, primarily the Tejon Pass on Interstate 5 between the Greater Los Angeles Area and the San Joaquin Valley, has made the city a regional transportation hub.

In 1990, Bakersfield was one of 10 U.S. communities to receive the All-America City Award from the National Civic League.

In 2010, the Bakersfield MSA had a gross metropolitan product of $29.466 billion, making it the 73rd-largest metropolitan economy in the United States.

=== Historic architecture and preservation ===
Bakersfield has several buildings and locations designated as historic sites at the national, state, and city levels. Five buildings have been listed on the National Register of Historic Places (NRHP), including the First Baptist Church (NRHP 1/2/79); Baker Street Library (NRHP 4/1/81) and Bakersfield Californian Building (NRHP 3/10/83). Four sites have been designated as California Historical Landmarks, including Garces Memorial Circle (designated in 1937) and the Colonel Thomas Baker Memorial (designated in 1944). In addition, 16 sites have been locally designated on the Bakersfield Register of Historic Places, including the Fox Theater (designated 8/24/94) and Kern County Chamber of Commerce Building (designated 3/12/08). With only 16 sites on its local register (compared to more than 300 sites designated by the City of Fresno), Bakersfield has been criticized for its lack of focus on historic preservation.

== Geography ==
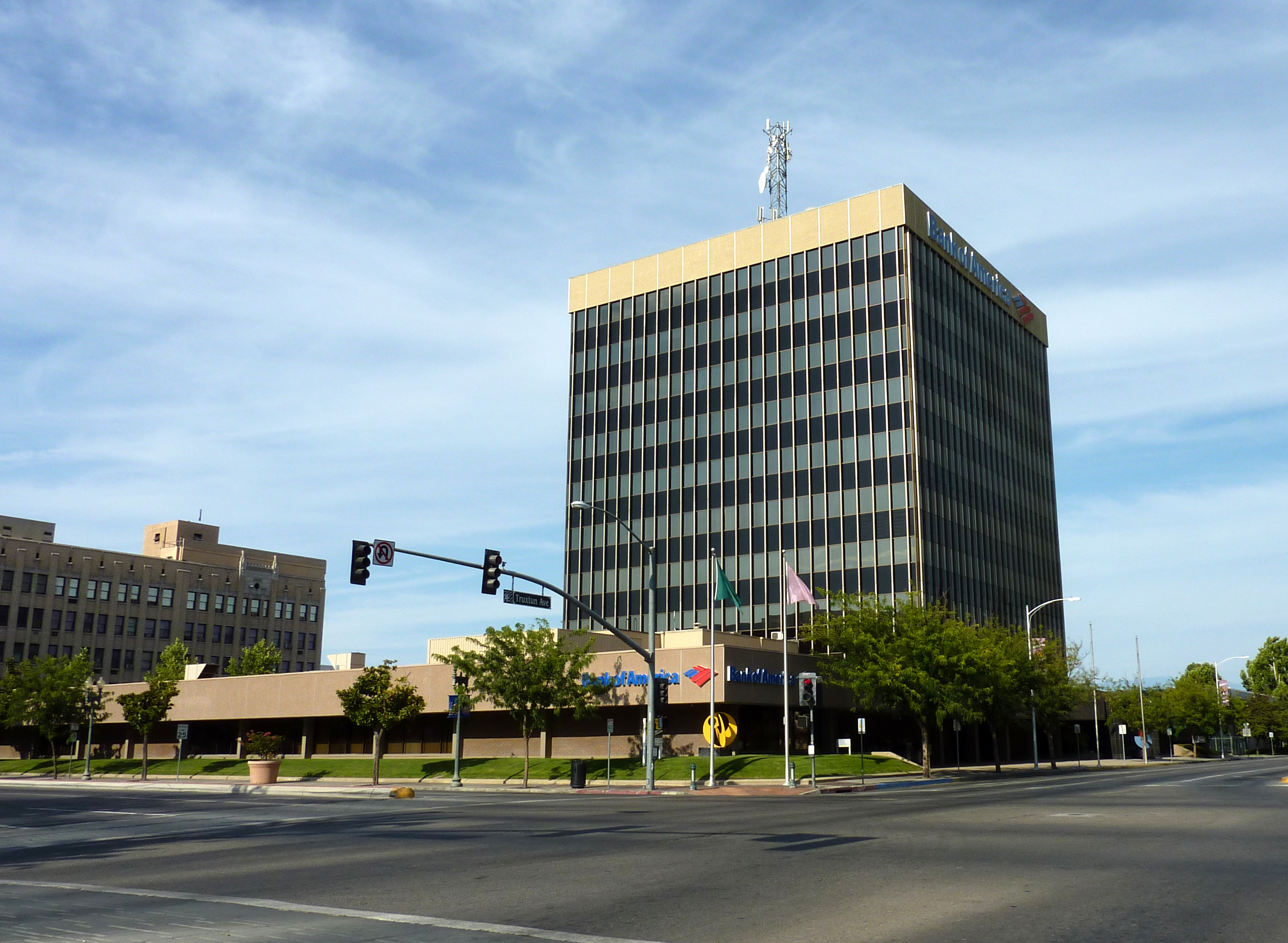
Truxtun Tower, also referred to as the Bank of America Building, is the tallest in downtown and the second-tallest building in Bakersfield.

Bakersfield is located near the southern end of the San Joaquin Valley, with the southern tip of the Sierra Nevada just to the east. The city limits extend to the Sequoia National Forest, at the foot of the Greenhorn Mountain Range and the entrance to the Kern Canyon. To the south, the Tehachapi Mountains, rising more than a vertical mile, feature the historic Tejon Ranch. To the west is the Temblor Range, behind which is the Carrizo Plain National Monument and the San Andreas Fault. The Temblor Range is about 35 mi (56 km) from Bakersfield across the valley floor.

The Kern River created a fertile region consisting of a large alluvial plain, or inland delta, which once spread out into vast wetlands and seasonal lakes in the region. Most of the river's flow is now diverted into various canals for agricultural use in the southern San Joaquin Valley, and provides municipal water supplies to the City of Bakersfield and surrounding areas. Diverting the river's flow has left 30 miles (48 km) of the riverbed that runs through Bakersfield dry.

According to the United States Census Bureau, the city has a total area of 143.6 sq mi (372 km^{2}), of which 142.2 sq mi (368 km^{2}) are land (98.99%) and 1.4 sq mi (3.6 km^{2}) are covered by water (1.01%).

At the 2000 census, the city had a total area of 114.4 sq mi (296 km^{2}), of which 113.1 sq mi (293 km^{2}) were land (98.86%) and 1.3 sq mi (3.4 km^{2}) were water-covered (1.14%).

Hart Memorial Park is located in northeast Bakersfield along Alfred Harrell Highway.

=== Communities and neighborhoods ===
Bakersfield has historically referred to its regions by directional names. They include North Bakersfield, Northeast, Southeast, South Bakersfield, Southwest, and Northwest. East Bakersfield generally refers to the former town of Sumner (later renamed East Bakersfield). As a result, the Northeast wraps around East Bakersfield.

== Climate ==
Bakersfield has a hot arid climate (Köppen BWh), with sweltering, virtually rainless summers and winters that consist of mild days with chilly/cold nights. Rainfall is low in the city, averaging only 6.36 inches (161.5 mm) annually, with most of it falling in the winter. Bakersfield averages about 191 clear days a year. Bakersfield's climate makes the region suitable for growing crops ranging from carrots to citrus and almonds.

Bakersfield summers are quite hot, with occasional stretches of extreme heat and 112 days per year with high temperatures of 90 °F (32.2 °C)+ (on average between April 18 and October 13); in addition, there are 36 days with highs of 100 °F (37.8 °C)+ (on average between June 2 and September 19), and 0.9 days with highs of 110 °F (43.3 °C)+. The frequency of 110 °F (43.3 °C) readings can significantly vary each year, with the record being 17 days in 1931. The most recent year to have more than five days of 110 °F (43.3 °C)+ temperature readings was 2017, with seven days reaching or exceeding 110 °F (43.3 °C). Temperatures can be highly variable throughout the spring, summer and fall months every year, with triple digit temperature readings in May, and on rare occasion April and October, in addition to occasional high temperatures below 80 °F (26.7 °C) in June and September not being uncommon. The warmest month on record was July 2024, with an average temperature of 90.8 °F (32.7 °C). Except for occasional monsoons, which may bring light rain, typically no rain or almost no rain will fall from May to September.

Winters feature mild daytime temperatures and chilly/cold nights. Frost and/or dense fog usually occurs in winter with accompanying low visibility, causing many schools to have fog delays. Winters will usually produce a very dense layer of fog occasionally. Due to years of prolonged drought and the rapid development of many new neighborhoods around Bakersfield, the density of the fog and the number of "fog days" has steadily decreased. At the same time, areas outside the city still experience thick fog. The official time frame for tule fog to form is about five months long – various days from November 1 to March 31. Most noticeable in summer and winter, the urban heat island phenomenon can be observed throughout various neighborhoods in Bakersfield. Areas closer to downtown and along the 99 freeway corridor can experience warmer temperatures at night than neighborhoods on the edge of the city limits and rural Kern County areas, with temperature differences up to 7 °F (4 °C) between these areas at any given time. On average, ten mornings have freezing lows (on average between December 14 and January 24) annually, and the coldest night of the year typically bottoms out below 30 °F or −1.1 °C. On January 2, 2012, Bakersfield reached a record high of 82 °F (27.8 °C) for that year's winter.

Spring and fall typically feature mild to warm daytime high temperatures with cool nighttime low temperatures, but temperatures and precipitation can vary significantly depending on the year. There can be hot days in excess of 90 °F or 32.2 °C as early as April. More than 50 percent of Bakersfield's annual precipitation falls between January and March, with the remainder falling during late fall and early winter.

Snow is rare on the valley floor, although frost may occur. The last snow fell on January 25, 1999, when the city received up to 6 inches or 0.15 meters, with 3 inches or 0.076 meters at the airport. The record maximum temperature was 118 °F (47.8 °C) on July 28, 1908, and the record minimum temperature was 12 °F (−11.1 °C) on January 3, 1908. The most rainfall in one month was 5.82 inches (147.8 mm) in December 2010, and the maximum 24-hour rainfall was 2.29 inches (58.2 mm) on February 9, 1978. The wettest "rain year" has been from July 1997 to June 1998 with 14.73 inches (374.1 mm) and the driest from July 1933 to June 1934 with 2.26 inches (57.4 mm).

Climate data for Bakersfield, California, 1991–2020 normals, (Note: Mean maxima and minima (i.e., the highest and lowest temperature readings during an entire month or year) calculated based on data at the said location from 1991 to 2020) extremes 1893–present (Note: Official records for Bakersfield kept at Santa Fe Railway Station (at 14th and F Streets) from 1893 to September 1937, and Meadows Field since October 1937. For more information, see Threadex.)
Month	Jan	Feb	Mar	Apr	May	Jun	Jul	Aug	Sep	Oct	Nov	Dec	Year
Record high °F (°C)	82 (28)	88 (31)	94 (34)	101 (38)	110 (43)	114 (46)	118 (48)	117 (47)	115 (46)	104 (40)	95 (35)	87 (31)	118 (48)
Mean maximum °F (°C)	72.1 (22.3)	77.0 (25.0)	84.4 (29.1)	92.2 (33.4)	99.0 (37.2)	105.4 (40.8)	107.2 (41.8)	106.9 (41.6)	103.0 (39.4)	94.5 (34.7)	82.1 (27.8)	71.5 (21.9)	109.0 (42.8)
Mean daily maximum °F (°C)	58.5 (14.7)	64.3 (17.9)	70.2 (21.2)	75.9 (24.4)	84.1 (28.9)	92.3 (33.5)	98.3 (36.8)	96.9 (36.1)	91.4 (33.0)	80.2 (26.8)	67.1 (19.5)	58.8 (14.9)	78.2 (25.7)
Daily mean °F (°C)	49.5 (9.7)	53.8 (12.1)	58.6 (14.8)	63.3 (17.4)	71.1 (21.7)	78.7 (25.9)	84.8 (29.3)	83.4 (28.6)	78.2 (25.7)	67.7 (19.8)	56.3 (13.5)	49.2 (9.6)	66.2 (19.0)
Mean daily minimum °F (°C)	40.5 (4.7)	43.2 (6.2)	47.0 (8.3)	50.7 (10.4)	58.0 (14.4)	65.1 (18.4)	71.3 (21.8)	70.0 (21.1)	65.0 (18.3)	55.2 (12.9)	45.4 (7.4)	39.6 (4.2)	54.2 (12.3)
Mean minimum °F (°C)	30.5 (−0.8)	33.7 (0.9)	36.8 (2.7)	39.8 (4.3)	47.4 (8.6)	53.0 (11.7)	61.9 (16.6)	60.7 (15.9)	54.5 (12.5)	44.7 (7.1)	34.8 (1.6)	29.6 (−1.3)	28.4 (−2.0)
Record low °F (°C)	12 (−11)	20 (−7)	20 (−7)	28 (−2)	34 (1)	38 (3)	45 (7)	44 (7)	30 (−1)	29 (−2)	22 (−6)	13 (−11)	12 (−11)
Average precipitation inches (mm)	1.19 (30)	1.18 (30)	1.15 (29)	0.60 (15)	0.25 (6.4)	0.05 (1.3)	0.00 (0.00)	0.00 (0.00)	0.05 (1.3)	0.28 (7.1)	0.51 (13)	1.10 (28)	6.36 (162)
Average snowfall inches (cm)	0.1 (0.25)	0.0 (0.0)	0.0 (0.0)	0.0 (0.0)	0.0 (0.0)	0.0 (0.0)	0.0 (0.0)	0.0 (0.0)	0.0 (0.0)	0.0 (0.0)	0.0 (0.0)	0.0 (0.0)	0.1 (0.25)
Average precipitation days (≥ 0.01 in)	6.3	6.8	6.0	3.9	2.1	0.4	0.2	0.1	0.6	1.6	3.6	6.0	37.6
Average snowy days (≥ 0.1 in)	0.0	0.0	0.0	0.0	0.0	0.0	0.0	0.0	0.0	0.0	0.0	0.0	0.0
Mean monthly sunshine hours	186	197.8	279	300	341	360	372	341	300	279	210	155	3,320.8
Mean daily sunshine hours	6	7	9	10	11	12	12	11	10	9	7	5	9
Percentage possible sunshine	59	64	75	76	79	83	84	82	81	80	68	51	74
Average ultraviolet index	3	4	6	8	9	10	10	10	8	5	4	2	7
Source 1: NOAA
Source 2: Climate Atlas (sun and uv)

=== Air quality ===
Air quality is generally at its worst in fall and winter due to the California wildfire season and colder temperatures forming an inversion layer, respectively. It is common for an inversion layer to form in the valley in the winter, in which temperatures can be warmer in the foothills above the valley with the valley itself being cooler. This can trap air pollution in Bakersfield and the surrounding valley areas for days or even weeks. This can typically be mediated by rain or strong winds.

Emissions from agriculture, industry, rail freight and road traffic together create significant concentrations of air pollution. The extraction of oil and gas, a historic industry in the area, contributes to the poor air quality. Returning flowing water to the Kern River and along with trees is promoted as a way to improve air quality and enhance recreation in the city.

== Demographics ==
Historical population
Census	Pop.	Note	%±
1880	801		—
1890	2,626		227.8%
1900	4,836		84.2%
1910	12,727		163.2%
1920	18,638		46.4%
1930	26,015		39.6%
1940	29,252		12.4%
1950	34,784		18.9%
1960	56,848		63.4%
1970	69,515		22.3%
1980	105,611		51.9%
1990	174,820		65.5%
2000	247,057		41.3%
2010	347,483		40.6%
2020	403,455		16.1%
2025 (est.)	422,165	▲	4.6%
U.S. Decennial Census

Historical racial composition	2020	2010	1990	1970	1940
White	38.9%	56.8%	72.7%	83.6%	94.6%
—Non-Hispanic	28.8%	37.8%	65.9%	70.8% (Note: From 15% sample)	n/a
Black or African American	7.0%	8.1%	9.4%	13.3%	3.5%
Hispanic or Latino (of any race)	52.7%	45.5%	20.5%	10.9%	n/a
Asian	7.8%	6.2%	3.6%	1.1%	−
Two or more Races	16.6%	4.9%	n/a	n/a	n/a

=== Racial and ethnic composition ===
Bakersfield, California – Racial and ethnic composition Note: the US Census treats Hispanic/Latino as an ethnic category. This table excludes Latinos from the racial categories and assigns them to a separate category. Hispanics/Latinos may be of any race.
Race / Ethnicity (NH=Non-Hispanic)	Pop 2000	Pop 2010	Pop 2020	% 2000	% 2010	% 2020
White alone (NH)	126,183	131,311	116,311	51.07%	37.79%	28.83%
Black or African American alone (NH)	21,987	26,677	26,402	8.90%	7.68%	6.54%
Native American or Alaska Native alone (NH)	2,053	2,265	2,153	0.83%	0.65%	0.53%
Asian alone (NH)	10,239	20,496	30,268	4.14%	5.90%	7.50%
Native Hawaiian or Pacific Islander alone (NH)	188	357	505	0.08%	0.10%	0.13%
Other race alone (NH)	335	681	2,430	0.14%	0.20%	0.60%
Mixed race or Multiracial (NH)	5,902	7,491	12,564	2.39%	2.16%	3.11%
Hispanic or Latino (any race)	80,170	158,205	212,822	32.45%	45.53%	52.75%
Total	247,057	347,483	403,455	100.00%	100.00%	100.00%

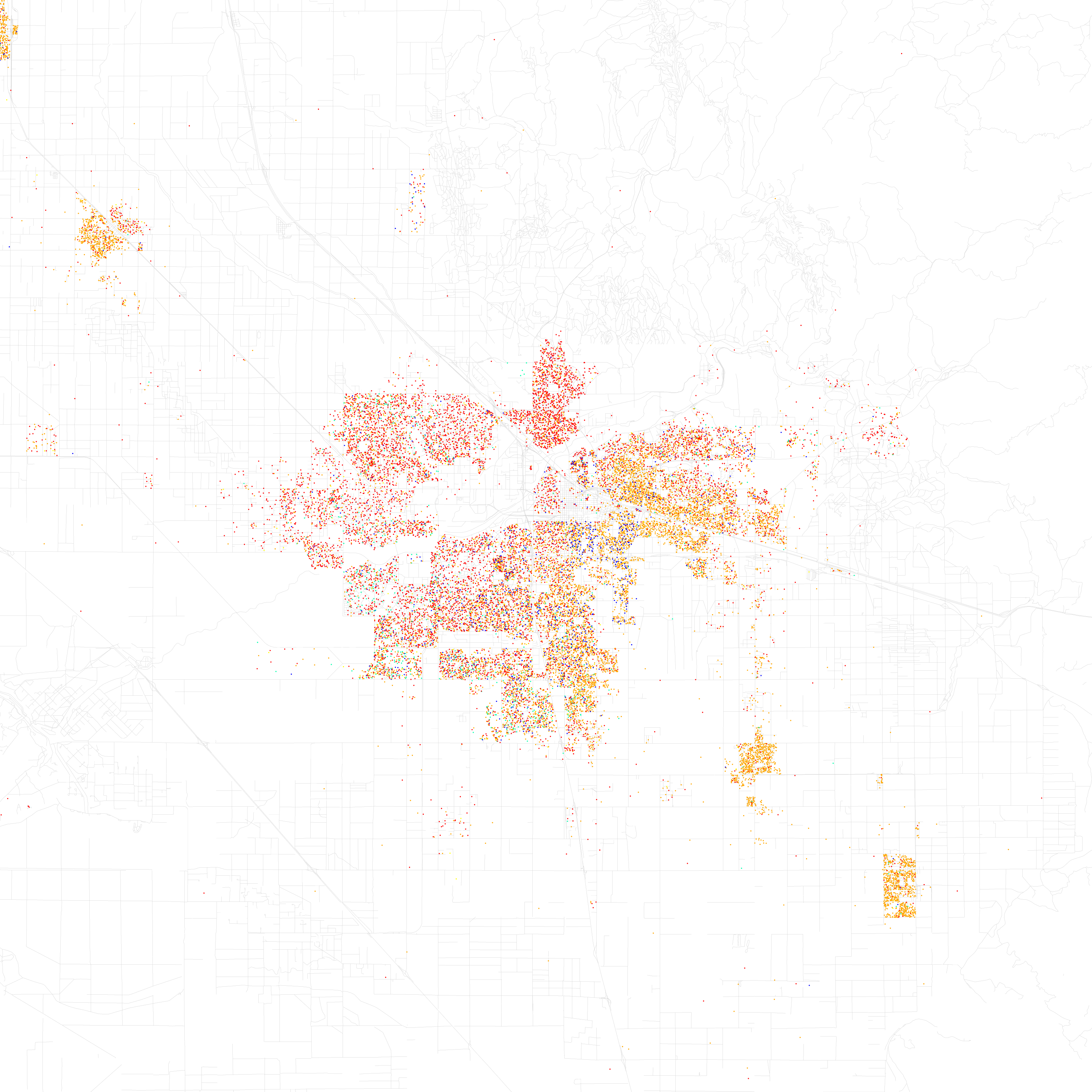
Map of racial distribution in Bakersfield, 2010 U.S. Census. Each dot is 25 people: ⬤ White ⬤ Black ⬤ Asian ⬤ Hispanic ⬤ Other

=== 2010 ===
The 2010 United States census reported that Bakersfield had a population of 347,483. The population density was 2,419.6 inhabitants per square mile (934.2/km^{2}). The ethnic makeup of Bakersfield was 197,389 (56.8%) White, 28,238 (8.1%) African American, 5,102 (1.5%) Native American, 21,432 (6.2%) Asian (2.1% Indian, 2.0% Filipino, 0.5% Chinese, 0.4% Korean, 0.2% Japanese, 478 (0.1%) Pacific Islander), 77,686 (22.4%) from other races, and 17,068 (4.9%) from two or more races. Hispanics or Latinos of any race were 158,205 persons (45.5%). Among the general population, 39.5% are Mexican, 1.3% Salvadoran, 0.5% Guatemalan, and 0.10% Colombian. Non-Hispanic Whites were 37.8% of the population in 2010, compared to 71% in 1980.

The census reported 344,088 people (99.0% of the population) lived in households, 2,094 (0.6%) lived in noninstitutionalized group quarters, and 1,301 (0.4%) were institutionalized.

Of the 111,132 households, 51,995 (46.8%) had children under the age of 18 living in them, 57,276 (51.5%) were opposite-sex married couples living together, 18,049 (16.2%) had a female householder with no husband present, and 7,829 (7.0%) had a male householder with no wife present. There were 8,159 (7.3%) unmarried opposite-sex partnerships, and 845 (0.8%) same-sex married couples or partnerships. About 21,800 households (19.6%) were made up of individuals, and 7,354 (6.6%) had someone living alone who was 65 years of age or older. The average household size was 3.10. There were 83,154 families (74.8% of all households); the average family size was 3.56.

The population was distributed as 109,479 people (31.5%) under the age of 18, 37,368 (10.8%) aged 18 to 24, 97,024 (27.9%) aged 25 to 44, 74,276 (21.4%) aged 45 to 64, and 29,336 (8.4%) who were 65 years of age or older. The median age was 30.0 years. For every 100 females, there were 96.0 males; for every 100 females age 18 and over, there were 92.5 males.

The 120,725 housing units averaged 840.6 per square mile (324.6/km^{2}), of which 66,323 (59.7%) were owner-occupied, and 44,809 (40.3%) were occupied by renters. The homeowner vacancy rate was 3.2%; the rental vacancy rate was 9.0%. About 206,492 people (59.4%) lived in owner-occupied housing units, and 137,596 (39.6%) lived in rental housing units.

Bakersfield has consistently ranked as one of the least educated metropolitan areas in the United States. A study by the Brookings Institution using 2008 data found that the proportion of Bakersfield metro adults age 25 and over with a bachelor's degree was the lowest (14.7%) of the 100 largest metropolitan areas in the United States; that 100th-place finish was down from being ranked 95th in 1990.

According to a Gallup-Healthways Well-Being Index, Bakersfield ranks as one of the ten most obese metro areas in America. Of its residents, 33.6% were obese, compared to the national average of 26.5%. The same study found that 21.2% were smokers, 12.7% had diabetes, 27.9% had high blood pressure, 22.8% had high cholesterol, 3.3% have suffered a heart attack, 75.2% felt they had enough money to buy food and 75.5% had health insurance.

=== Housing and development ===
Bakersfield saw its population grow from about 105,000 in 1980 to over 400,000 in 2020. Although the city is still growing, its growth rate has slowed in recent years due to the economic recession and high home foreclosure rates. However, in October 2013, Bakersfield was found to be the number two city in the nation for the rental market. Apartment vacancies have become a large issue, with only one percent of potential apartments being open to new renters as of April 2021. The average cost of rent and housing has dramatically increased in the last few years, with some apartments having their monthly rent nearly double in cost. Most new apartments being built are catering to commuting workers from Southern California and the Bay Area, with local residents being priced out.

The city of Shafter, a small farming town north of Bakersfield, previously filed a suit to attempt to limit the northern expansion of Bakersfield's city limits. Shafter has also annexed large pieces of farmland to its east and south to ensure that Bakersfield does not annex this area. Bakersfield, in addition, filed a lawsuit against Shafter in 2007 regarding water rights Shafter planned to use but Bakersfield stated it had purchased in 1976. As a result, the city of Bakersfield threatened to annex the city of Shafter.

The large bluff and plateau east of Bakersfield—toward the Rio Bravo and Kern Canyon area—has been under development for the last 60 years. Because the steep, north-facing edge of the bluff provides a view of the foothills, mountains, oil fields, and Kern River, the city government has attempted to balance development and preservation in this area.

== Economy ==
Bakersfield's historic and primary industries are related to Kern County's two main industries: oil and agriculture. Kern County in 2013 was the most oil productive county in the US. Kern County is a part of the highly productive San Joaquin Valley and ranks in the top five most productive agricultural counties in the nation. Major crops for Kern County include grapes, citrus, almonds, carrots, alfalfa, cotton, and roses. The city is home to the corporate and regional headquarters of companies engaged in these industries.

Bakersfield has a growing manufacturing and distribution sector. Several companies have moved to Bakersfield because of its inexpensive land, as well as proximity to international ports in both Los Angeles and Oakland. Other companies have opened regional offices and non-oil/agricultural businesses because of Bakersfield's and Kern County's business-friendly policies, such as having no local utility or inventory taxes. Products manufactured in the city include ice cream (the world's largest ice cream plant), central vacuums, highway paint, and stock racing cars.

Sales tax in Bakersfield is 8.25%.

=== Top employers ===
According to the Bakersfield Annual Comprehensive Financial Report, as of 2024, the top employers in the county based in Bakersfield were:

#	Employer	# of Employees
1	County of Kern	7,559
2	Kern High School District	5,406
3	Bakersfield City School District	3,811
4	Dignity Health	3,520
5	Panama-Buena Vista Union School District	3,055
6	Adventist Health Bakersfield	2,745
7	Kern Medical Center	2,437
8	City of Bakersfield	1,799
9	Kern County Superintendent of Schools	1,766
10	Bolthouse Farms	1,572

== Arts and culture ==
Many of Bakersfield's oldest and most historic restaurants are Basque, including Wool Growers, Noriega's, Pyrenees, Benji's, and Narducci's.

The Kern County Museum on Chester Avenue just north of downtown Bakersfield holds a collection of regional artifacts. Permanent exhibits include "Black Gold: The Oil Experience", a hands-on modern approach to showing how oil is extracted; and "The Lori Brock Children's Discovery Museum", a hands-on children's museum and a display on the influential "Bakersfield Sound" style of country music. Bakersfield is also home to the Buena Vista Museum of Natural History, which has a collection of Miocene era marine fossils collected from the region as well as other displays.

The city gained fame in the late 1950s and early 1960s for the Bakersfield Sound, an electric guitar-driven subgenre of country music that commercially dominated the industry for over a decade. Buck Owens, Dwight Yoakam, and Merle Haggard were its best-known stars.

=== Events ===
Bakersfield hosts year-round horse shows, including local, 4-H and breed shows.

Every spring, Bakersfield hosts one of California's Scottish Games and Clan Gatherings. In the late summer, St. George's Greek Orthodox Church hosts an annual Greek Festival. In mid-October, St. Demiana Coptic Orthodox Church hosts an annual Coptic Festival.

Every year during the summer, Bakersfield hosts the Lowrider National at the Kern County Fairgrounds.

Memorial Day weekend features the Kern County Basque Festival, sponsored by the Kern County Basque Club. This three-day festival features food, music, dance, and handball games.

In March, Famoso Raceway holds the annual March Meet nostalgia drag racing event. The event dates back to the U.S. Fuel and Gas Finals, held in March 1959.

Twice a year, the CSUB Indigenous Native American Club hosts a Native Gathering on the California State University Bakersfield campus at Runner Park.

In mid-to late September, Bakersfield holds the annual Kern County Fair, which showcases the area's agricultural produce and animal husbandry. The fair also includes a rodeo, concerts, and a traditional carnival.

Previously every year and now every five years, Bakersfield hosts a political conference known as the Bakersfield Business Conference. Since 1985, this conference has grown in attendance; as of 2007, the attendance numbered over 9,000. The Conference has had several notable political speakers including Ronald Reagan, Jimmy Carter, Gerald Ford, George H. W. Bush, Margaret Thatcher, Neil Armstrong, Norman Schwarzkopf, Colin Powell, Mike Wallace, Dan Rather, Tom Brokaw, Rush Limbaugh, Sarah Palin and Paul Harvey.

Writers of Kern hosts their Spring Writers Conference in March or April each year. Edgar Award winner and internationally bestselling author Anne Perry was a notable speaker at one of these writer's conferences.

=== Entertainment ===
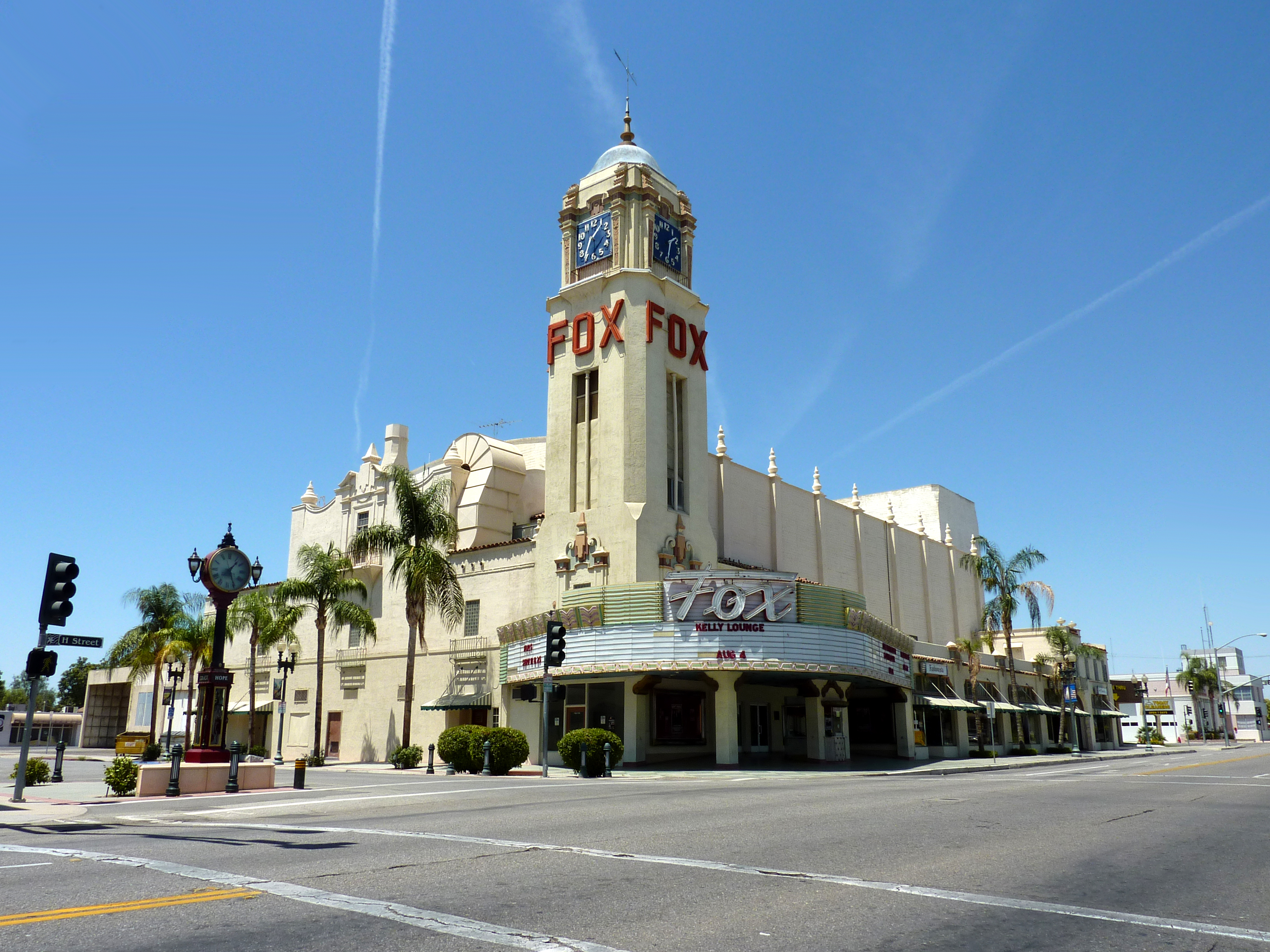
The Fox Theater

Bakersfield has five movie multi-screen theaters: Edwards Bakersfield Stadium 14, Reading Cinemas Valley Plaza 16, Maya Cinemas Bakersfield 16, AMC Bakersfield 6, and a Studio Movie Grill. The historic downtown Fox Theater has been renovated and is now a venue for concerts, musicians, comedians, and movies. The Bakersfield Community Theatre is the oldest "live" community theater in California. The Empty Space is another theater which offers some free performances.

=== Music ===
Due to the Dust Bowl, Buck Owens and his family migrated west where they would travel from Phoenix to the San Joaquin Valley to pick crops, including cotton. At 16, Owens moved to Bakersfield in 1951, where he and other musicians began to create what is now known as the Bakersfield sound. In 1996, Buck Owens opened the Crystal Palace, a music hall, nightclub, bar, restaurant, and museum, in Bakersfield.

Musician Merle Haggard was born and raised in Oildale. In 1962, Haggard completed his first single, "Skid Row", on Bakersfield's Tally label. In 1965, he went on to sign with Capitol Records. Most of Haggard's early songs reflect his time spent in prison, farming, and working blue-collar jobs in Southern California, including Bakersfield.

Bakersfield is often considered to be the birthplace of a unique strand of country music that has inspired many country artists, such as Dwight Yoakam and The Strangers. Yoakam, alongside Owens, paid tribute to Owens by covering his 1973 recording of "Streets of Bakersfield". The cover reached number one on the Billboard Hot Country Singles chart in 1988.

Sacred music composer, pianist and singer Gloria Roe was born in Bakersfield in 1935.

==== Classical ====
The Bakersfield Symphony Orchestra has been performing since 1932.

==== Country ====
Bakersfield is known for the Bakersfield sound, "a twangy style of Fender Telecaster and pedal steel guitar music made popular by hometown country crooners Buck Owens and Merle Haggard" as well as The Strangers.

==== Doo-wop ====
Bakersfield is also known for Doo-wop music dating back from the early-to-mid 1950s to the early-to-late 1960s, consisting of Doo-wop vocal groups such as The Paradons, The Colts, The Rev-Lons, and more.

==== Rock ====
In 1972, Bob Weir released the song "Mexicali Blues" on his first solo album, Ace. Not only does the sound of the song pay tribute to the Bakersfield sound, but the name of the city is referenced in the lyrics.

In the early 1990s, a group of friends from the lower and middle-class parts of Northeast and East Bakersfield formed the nu metal band Korn. The members of the band attended Highland High School (Jonathan Davis and Reginald "Fieldy" Arvizu), East High School (James "Munky" Shaffer and lead guitarist Brian "Head" Welch) and South High School (David Silveria). Korn has sold over 34 million albums worldwide and were given the keys to the city.

Bakersfield is also the home of fellow metal groups Cradle of Thorns and Adema. The band formed in 2000 with members vocalist Mark Chavez (half brother to Korn frontman Davis), guitarist Tim Fluckey, guitarist Mike Ransom, bassist Dave DeRoo, and drummer Kris Kohls. On February 24, 2006, Bakersfield mayor Harvey Hall declared February 24 "Korn Day". On the same day, the back road to the Rabobank Arena was named Korn Row.

Bakersfield is also the home of deathrock group Burning Image, one of the original bands of the early '80s Californian Deathrock scene.

== Sports ==
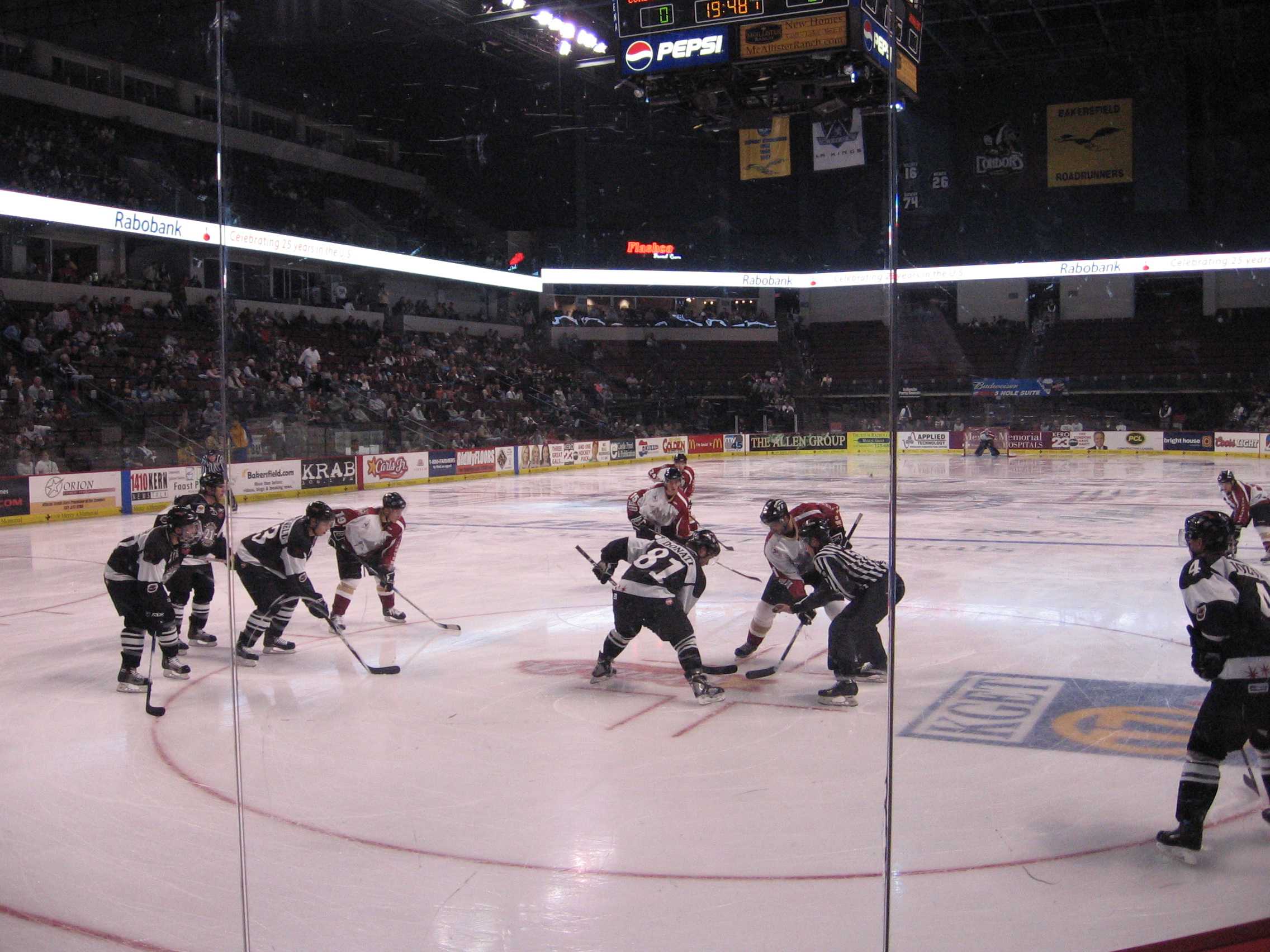
A minor league hockey game being played at Bakersfield's Dignity Health Arena

Bakersfield is not represented in any of the five major sports leagues: NFL, MLB, NBA, NHL, or MLS. The closest major sports teams are in Los Angeles, and they have many fans in Bakersfield. The city is home to three minor league professional sports teams: the Bakersfield Condors (American Hockey League), Bakersfield Train Robbers baseball club (Pecos League), and Bakersfield Majestics (United States Basketball League). It was previously home to two versions of the af2's Bakersfield Blitz (the first played from 2002 to 2004 before relocating to Fresno and becoming the Central Valley Coyotes and the second played from 2004 to 2006), the California League's Bakersfield Blaze baseball team, which ceased operations after the 2016 season. A third minor league team, the Bakersfield Jam of the D-League (basketball), was relocated to Prescott Valley, Arizona, in 2016.

In addition, Bakersfield has two colleges with strong athletics programs. The Bakersfield Renegades represent Bakersfield College, a community college with 19 varsity sports, the most notable being football. It competes in the Western State Conference, which is a part of the California Community College Athletic Association. The Cal State Bakersfield Roadrunners represent California State University, Bakersfield and sponsor 15 varsity sports, the most notable being basketball. It competes in NCAA Division I as a member of the Big West Conference

Bakersfield is home to Colby Lewis from the MLB team, the Texas Rangers, Stephen Neal from the Super Bowl Champions, New England Patriots. NFL players Joey Porter, David and Derek Carr, Jordan Love, and Krys Barnes also have called Bakersfield home and still have some connection to Bakersfield.

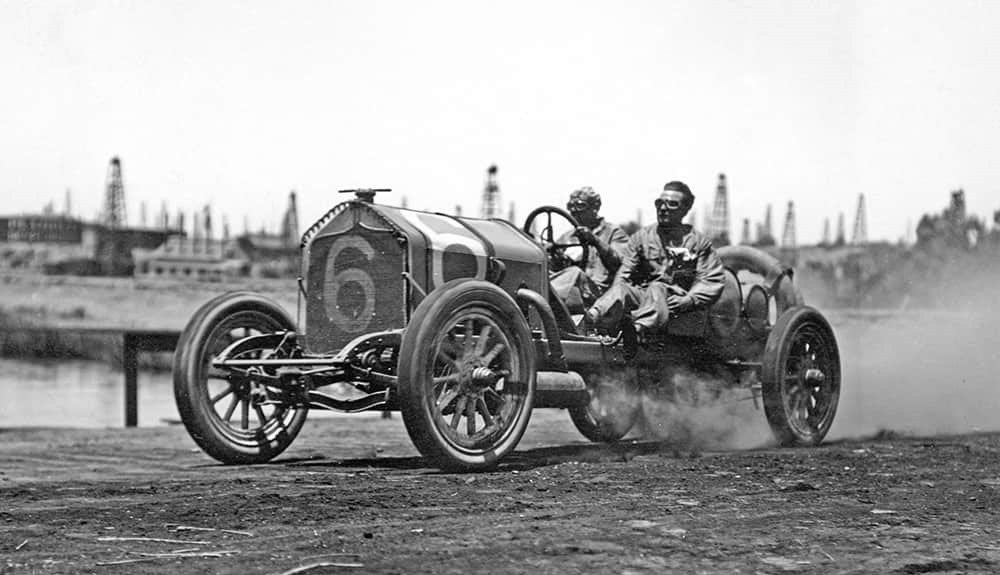
Harvey Herrick and his mechanician in Bakersfield during the 1911 Tevis Cup

Bakersfield is also located near a variety of motor racing venues. Current racing sports include drag strip (at Famoso Raceway), dirt (at Bakersfield Speedway), road course (at Buttonwillow Raceway), and a paved 1/2 mile oval (at Kern County Raceway Park), which replaced Mesa Marin Raceway, a NASCAR associated oval track, that was demolished in 2004. A 1/3 mile dirt track has also opened on the Kern County Raceway Park property.

The National Jet Boat Association holds drag boat races at Lake Ming. Bakersfield is also the hometown of four-time Indianapolis 500 winner and three-time American National Champion Rick Mears; as well as the 2007 Daytona 500 winner, and 2014 NASCAR Sprint Cup champion Kevin Harvick. The town also hosted an Indy car event during the 1911 season, won by Harvey Herrick.

Bakersfield has many venues for a variety of different sports. One of the most notable and versatile is the Dignity Health Arena (formerly the Centennial Garden, Rabobank Arena, and Mechanics Bank Arena), which hosts concerts, shows, and sporting events. Bakersfield has facilities that can host tournament games. The Kern County Soccer Field has 24 full-size light soccer fields. Also currently under construction is the Bakersfield Sports Village. When completed, it will have 16 baseball fields, six football fields, and 16 soccer fields.

== Government and politics ==
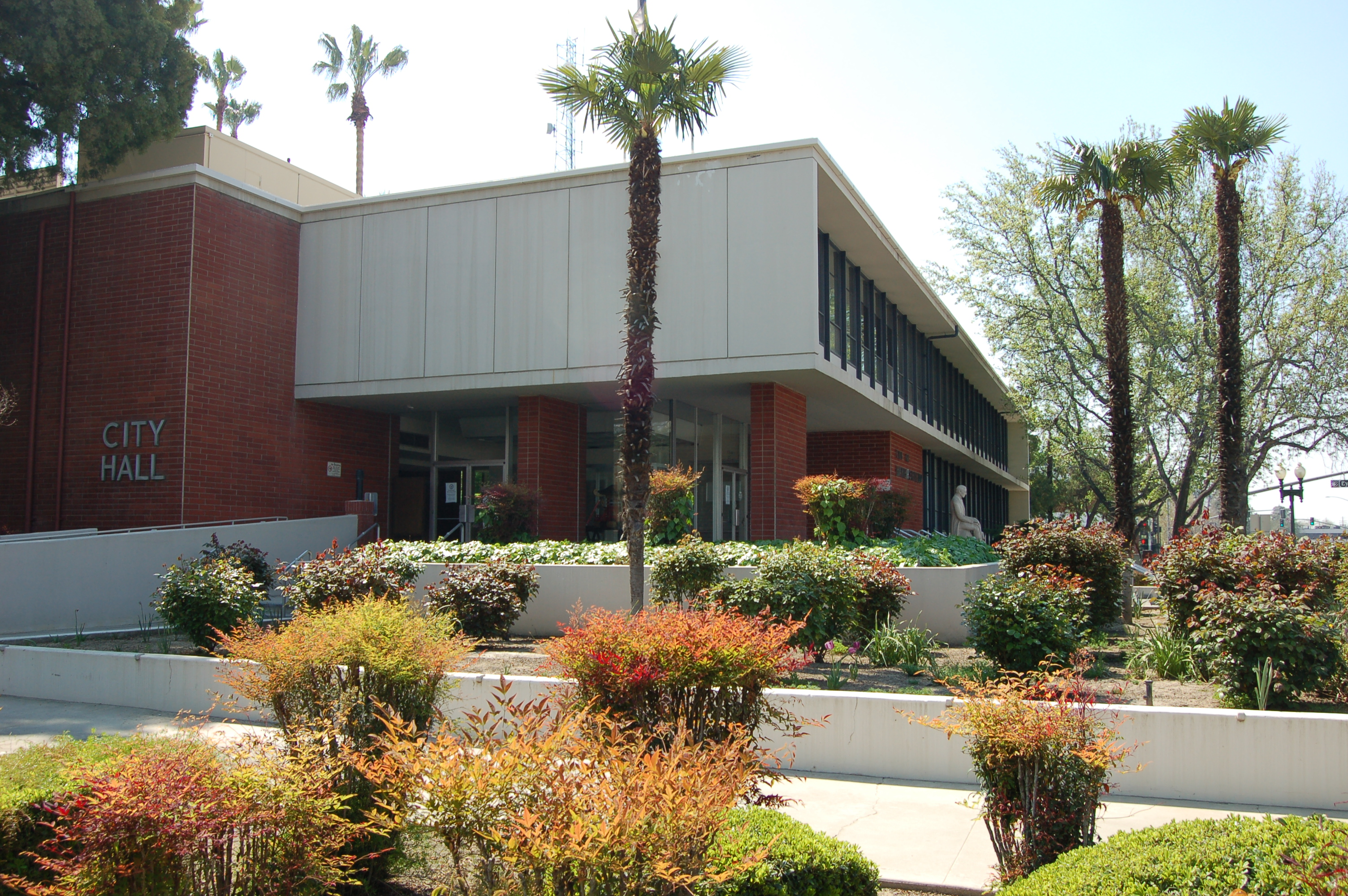
City Hall is the seat of government for the city. Both the mayor's office and city council chambers are located inside.

=== Local government ===
Bakersfield uses the Council-Manager form of government, in which the City Council is the primary governing authority. The City Council consists of seven members elected from seven wards (or districts). The Mayor is elected at large and is the presiding member of the City Council, although she does not cast a vote except in a few instances. The City Council appoints and confirms (which the mayor does cast a vote) both the City Attorney and the City Manager.

The City Manager appoints (does not require confirmation from the City Council) the Finance Director, City Clerk, and Deputy City Clerk. In addition to these positions, Bakersfield has several departments that provide the services necessary to the city. They are: Department of Development Services, Department of Economic and Community Development, Fire Department, Police Department, Department of Public Works, Department of Recreation and Parks, and Department of Water Resources.

The framework for the city government is defined in the City Charter. As of 2011, it contained 11 articles and four addendums. The current version was adopted in January 1915. Little information is known about the City Charter adopted in 1873 or 1898, when the city was incorporated. The City Charter has been amended several times since it was adopted. One of the more definitive amendments was to change the Mayor from an appointed position (by the City Council) to an elected position in 1956, which was done as a result of the 1952 Kern County earthquake.

The City Manager of Bakersfield is the appointed head of the executive branch. The position was created after 1957 when the role of mayor (which was the previous head) was split into two new positions. Under the council-manager form of government, the City Manager is responsible for executing ordinances passed by the city council and running the departments that make up the city. His office is currently located in City Hall North.

The city council appoints the city manager. His service can end in one of two ways. Either he resigns or by a vote of removal by the city council. The vote to appoint and remove is one of the few votes the mayor can cast.

For a list of past and present mayors, see List of mayors of Bakersfield.

=== State and federal ===
Federally, Bakersfield is split between California's 20th congressional district, which is represented by Republican Vince Fong, and California's 22nd congressional district, which is represented by Republican David Valadao.

=== Political makeup ===
An August 2005 article in the Seattle Post-Intelligencer listed Bakersfield as the eighth-most-conservative city in the United States and the most conservative city in California. In the 2008 presidential election, Republican John McCain received 55.6% of the city's votes to Democrat Barack Obama's 42.9%. The same year, Bakersfield cast 75.2% of its votes in favor of Proposition 8, which amended the California Constitution to ban same-sex marriage. In the 2016 presidential election, Donald Trump received 50.4% of the vote to Hillary Clinton's 44.0%. In 2020, Trump's vote share remained at 50.4%, while Joe Biden increased the Democratic showing to 47.2%. In the 2024 presidential election, Donald Trump received 56.5% of the vote in Bakersfield to Kamala Harris’s 41.0%.

=== Public safety ===
Law enforcement within the city limits is provided by the Bakersfield Police Department. Fire protection within the city is provided jointly by the Bakersfield Fire Department and by the Kern County Fire Department, which protects the county as a whole.

Bakersfield is traditionally acknowledged as the frontier delineating Sureño and Norteño gang territories.

==== Police ====
The Bakersfield Police Department (BPD) is the agency responsible for law enforcement. It has over 363 officers and 100 professional staff, covering an area of 145 square miles (380 km^{2}), serving an urban population of more than 800,000. The current chief of the department is Greg Terry. The department protects the city, split between two areas: West area and East area, with police headquarters in the east and the west substation serving west Bakersfield. The department administration comprises the police chief, one assistant chief, four captains, and eleven lieutenants.

The department headquarters are located at 1601 Truxtun Avenue. The West Substation is located at 1301 Buena Vista Road. Satellite offices are located on E. 11th Street and E. White Lane. The department pistol range is located on Truxtun Avenue, with the K-9 training grounds next door to the range. The department training academy is located on Norris Road and is in conjunction with the Kern County Sheriff's Department.

The 2015 Mapping Police Violence study calculated that Bakersfield police killed civilians at the highest rate in the U.S., logging 13.6 killings per million people, compared to the U.S. average of 3.6. In all, 13 people were killed in 2015 by BPD Officers and 27 people were killed by law enforcement officers in Kern County, which has a population of approximately 900,000. The Guardian reported that law enforcement officers in Kern County, California, killed more people per capita than in any other American county in 2015.

==== Fire ====
The Bakersfield Fire Department has 14 stations spread across the city.

The Bakersfield Fire Department's communications division, known as ECC (Emergency Communications Center), is located in the Whiting Communications Center in Northeast Bakersfield. ECC is a joint dispatch center for the Kern County, Bakersfield City, and California City Fire Departments. Built in 1988, ECC is responsible for dispatching resources over approximately 8,100 square miles (21,000 km^{2}), including 65 fire stations. ECC's approximate call volume is 82,000 calls annually, and it processes emergency and non-emergency fire and medical 911 calls for the entire county of Kern.

The Kern County Fire Department (KCFD) is the agency that provides fire protection and emergency medical services for the county of Kern, California, USA. With over 625 permanent employees and 100 extra help employees protecting an area spanning over 8,000 square miles (21,000 km^{2}). KCFD provides fire protection services for over 500,000 citizens living in the unincorporated areas of Kern County and the cities of Arvin, Delano, Maricopa, McFarland, Ridgecrest, Shafter, Taft, Tehachapi and Wasco. This agency is contracted to provide dispatch services for the California City Fire Department, Kern Ambulance based in Wasco, and Care Ambulance based in Lake Isabella. Over 546 uniformed firefighters are stationed in 46 fire stations throughout the county.

Due to the vast number of county islands and jagged city limit lines in the south part of Bakersfield, the closest fire station is dispatched to incidents. This often results in city resources being dispatched to county locations and vice versa.

=== Crime ===
The number of violent crimes recorded by the Bakersfield Police Department in its 2008 Crime Reports was 5,961. 27 of those were murders and homicides. Data collected by Bakersfield Police Department, an anti-gang program under the city of Bakersfield, shows that the city of Bakersfield has experienced an increase in gang membership and gang activity since the early 2000s.

==== Jails ====
The Bakersfield Police Department has a holding area, but inmates are transported to the Kern County Central Receiving Facility in Bakersfield. Sentenced criminals are held outside the city's limits at the Lerdo Detention Facility. The Kern County Sheriff's Office, Detentions Bureau has an average daily inmate population of approximately 2,500 inmates.

The primary facility for receiving inmates arrested in the Bakersfield area is the Central Receiving Facility. There is the Lerdo Complex, which consists of three facilities:

1. The Lerdo Minimum Security Facility holds inmates of lower security levels.
2. The Lerdo Pre-Trial Facility holds inmates of higher security levels.
3. The Lerdo Max/Med Security Facility holds overflow inmates from the Pre-Trial Facility.

== Education ==
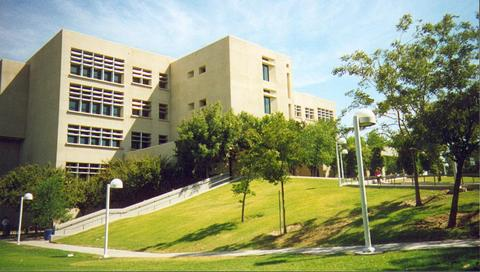
CSUB's Walter Stiern Library

Two of the earliest schools founded in Kern County were Mrs. Thomas Baker's school, opened in 1863 at the Baker home (near present-day 19th and N streets), and a Catholic parochial school opened by Reverend Father Daniel Dade in 1865 in Havilah (then the county seat). In 1880, Norris School was established. The land for this school was donated by William Norris, a local farmer. Thirteen to twenty students were taught in its one classroom during the 1880s. Bakersfield City School District (BCSD) is the state's largest elementary school district. The first high school in Bakersfield, Kern County Union High School, opened in 1893. It was renamed Bakersfield High School after World War II.

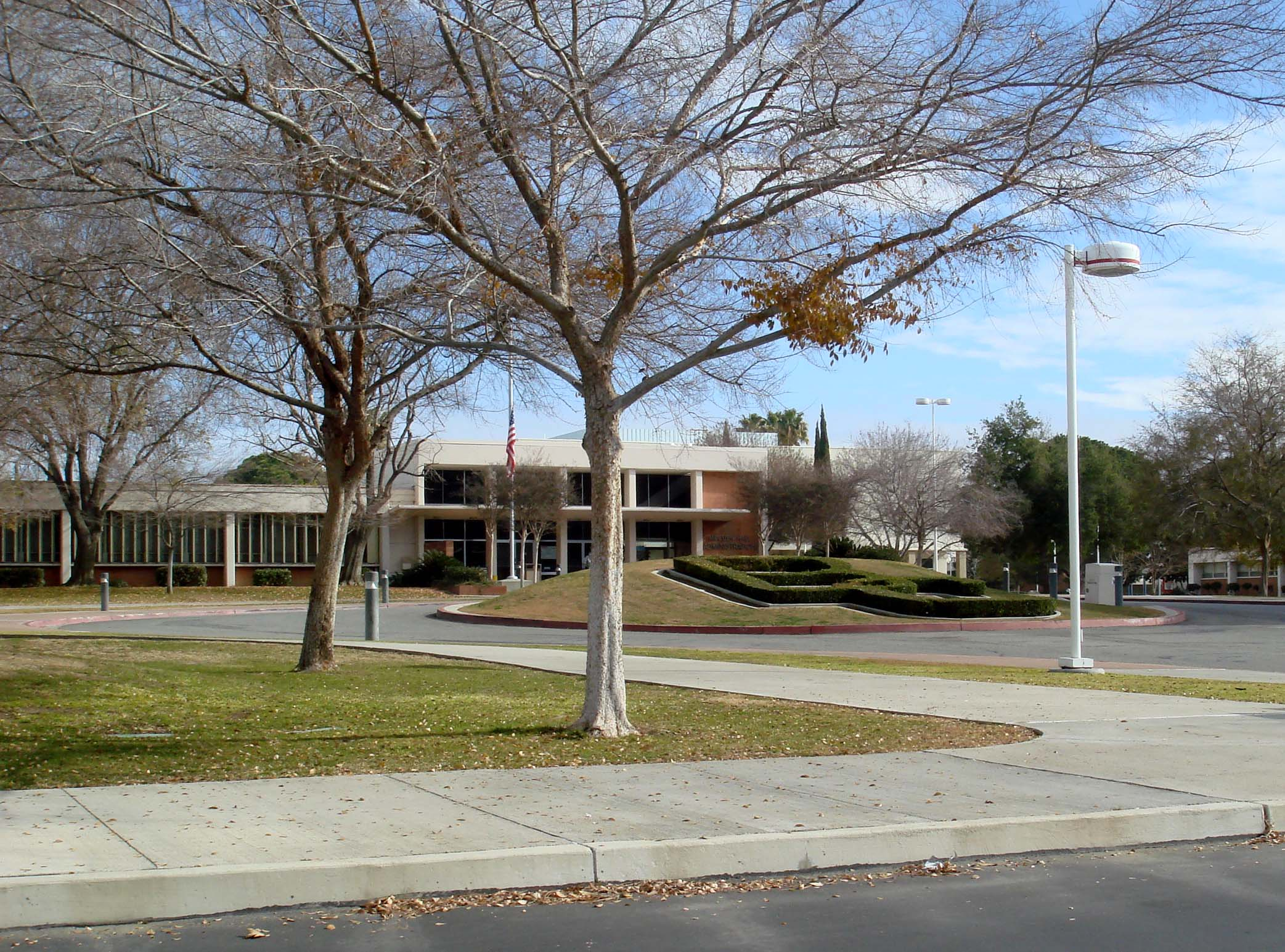
Bakersfield College

The site at California Avenue and F Street is the location of the first campus of Bakersfield College, which was established in 1913 and relocated in 1956 to its current location overlooking the Panorama Bluffs in northeast Bakersfield. Bakersfield College has an enrollment of 16,000 students. To serve a growing baby-boomer population after World War II, the Kern High School District has steadily expanded to nineteen campuses and more than 35,000 students, making it the largest high school district in the state.

In 1965, a university in the California State University system was founded in Bakersfield. California State University, Bakersfield (CSUB) has approximately 10,000 students. It was an NCAA Division II sports powerhouse in the California Collegiate Athletic Association (CCAA) with some sports, including wrestling (Pac-10), competing in Division I. CSUB has become a Division I athletic school and will join the Big West Conference in 2020. In 1982, the Bakersfield campus for Santa Barbara Business College was founded.

=== High schools ===
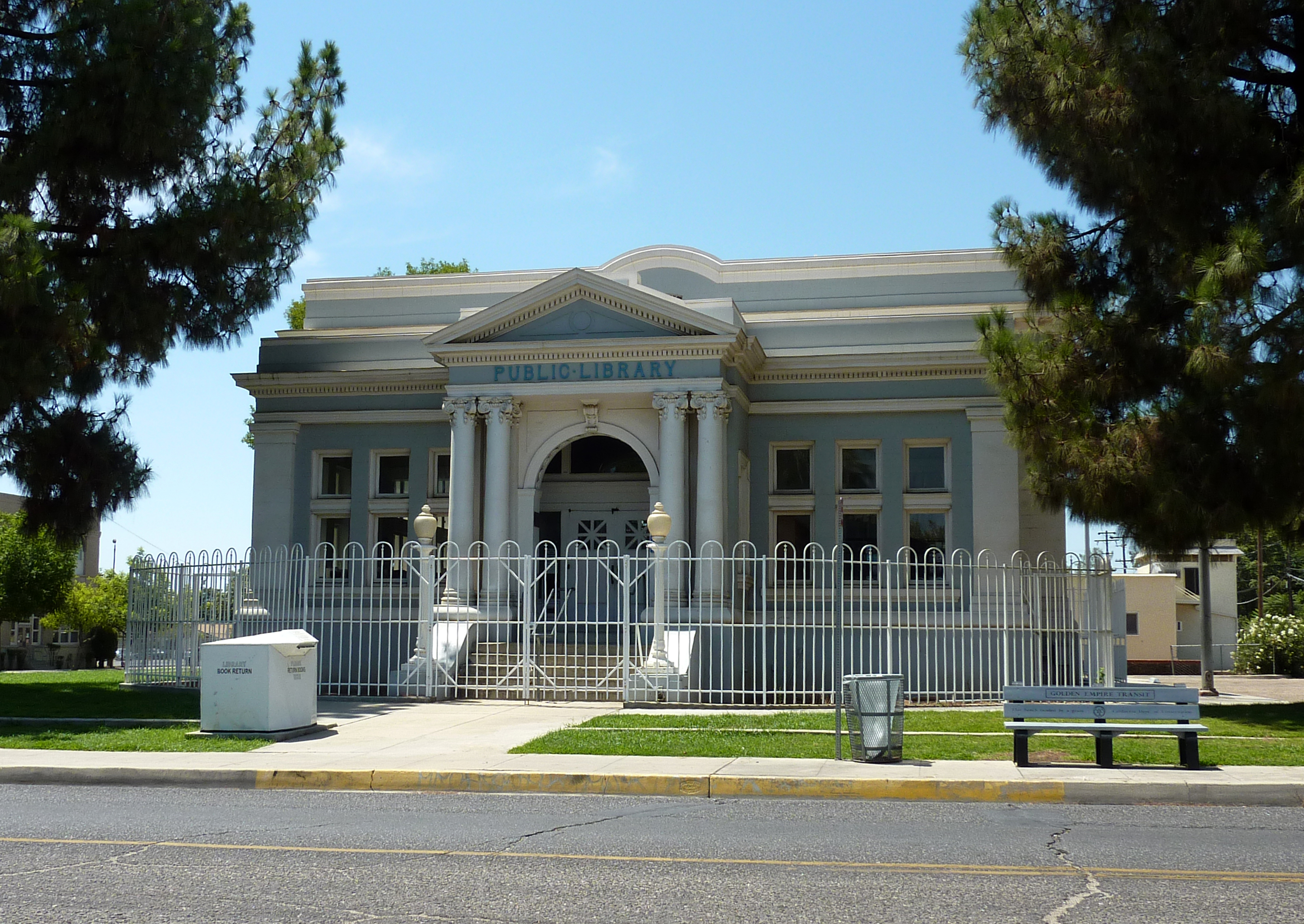
The Baker Street Branch Library, part of the Kern County Library system, is among the Bakersfield structures listed on the NRHP.

Bakersfield is part of the Kern High School District (KHSD), California's largest high school district, comprising 28 schools and educating about 35,000 students. There are 17 high schools within the KHSD in Bakersfield:

- Arvin High School
- Bakersfield High School
- Centennial High School
- Del Oro High School
- East Bakersfield High School
- Foothill High School
- Frontier High School
- Golden Valley High School
- Highland High School
- Independence High School
- Liberty High School
- Mira Monte High School
- North High School
- Ridgeview High School
- Shafter High School
- South High School
- Stockdale High School
- West High School

Private high schools include Garces Memorial High School, Bakersfield Christian High School, and Bakersfield Adventist Academy.

=== Accredited colleges and universities ===
==== California State University, Bakersfield ====
California State University, Bakersfield ("CSUB," "CSU Bakersfield," or "Cal State Bakersfield") is a public university founded in Bakersfield in 1965. CSUB opened in 1970 on a campus of 375 acres (1.52 km^{2}), becoming the 19th school in the California State University system. The university offers 31 bachelor's and 22 master's degree programs. As of fall 2017, over 10,000 undergraduate and graduate students attended CSUB at either the main campus in Bakersfield or the satellite campus, Antelope Valley Center in Lancaster, California.

==== Bakersfield College ====
Bakersfield College ("BC") is a public community college located in Bakersfield, California. Its main campus is on a 153-acre (0.62 km^{2}) campus in northeast Bakersfield, with two satellite campuses: the Weill Institute in downtown Bakersfield, and the Delano Center in Delano, California, approximately 35 miles (56 km) north of Bakersfield. BC serves more than 18,000 students each semester and is part of the Kern Community College District. Currently, there are 184 Associate's degree and certificate programs for students to choose from. BC is a part of the California Community Colleges system.

==== Other colleges and universities ====
National University and University of Phoenix maintains a campus in Bakersfield, while the University of LaVerne, Fresno Pacific University, and Point Loma Nazarene University all have branch campuses located in Bakersfield. San Joaquin Valley College and Santa Barbara Business College also have campuses in Bakersfield.

== Media ==
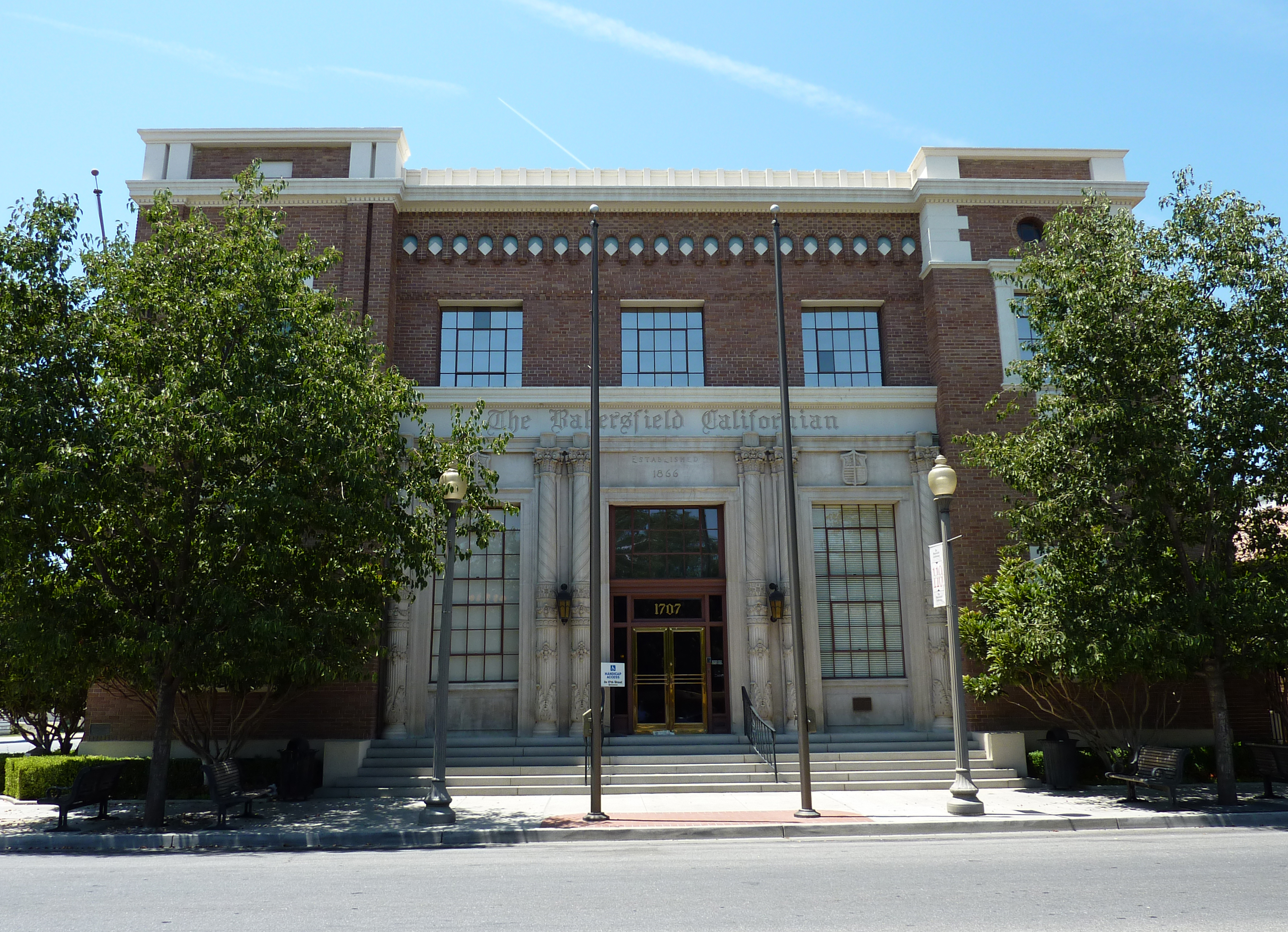
The Bakersfield Californian Building is also listed on the NRHP.

Bakersfield is served by several media outlets. The primary newspaper is The Bakersfield Californian, which is a direct descendant of the first paper published in the region, The Weekly Courier in 1866.

The city has several television stations and network affiliates, including KERO-TV (ABC), KBAK-TV (CBS), KGET-TV (NBC), KBFX-CD (Fox), KABE-CD (Univision), KKEY-LP (Telemundo), KNXT-LD (MyNetworkTV), KGET-DT2 (CW+), and is served by PBS member station KVPT in Fresno via translator station K18HD-D. Bakersfield is home to Spanish-language broadcaster Univision's only English-language station, KUVI-DT.

The city also receives signals from many different radio stations, which includes: KNZR (AM) (KNZR AM1560 & FM97.7), KKXX-FM (Hits 93.1), KUZZ (KUZZ AM 55/FM 107.9), KERN (KERN News Talk 96.1 and AM 1180), KLLY (Live 95.3), KBFP-FM (Sunny 105.3), KISV (Hot 94.1), KRAB (ALT 106.1 KRAB Radio), KHTY (Fox Sports 800 & 970), KKBB (Groove 99.3), KPSL-FM (96.5 Ritmo FM), KGFM (101.5 Big FM), KQKZ (Retro 92.1), KDFO (98.5 The Fox), Valley Public Radio (KVPR), and KIWI (Radio Lobo 102.9),

Other channels include KBDS (Fire 103.9), KBFP (AM) (Fox Sports 800 & 970), KGEO (ESPN Bakersfield), KNZR-FM (KNZR AM1560 & FM97.7), KCHJ (AM) (El Gallito (The Rooster)), KCWR (Real Country), KAFY, KERI (Faith & Family 1410 AM), KWAC (AM) (Tu Liga Radio 1490 AM), KMYX-FM (La Campesina 92.5 FM), KEBT (La Caliente 96.9), KHHT (FM) (Old School 98.9), KXTT (La Mejor 94.9), KVPM (Precious 95.7), KDUV (Spirit 88.9 & 100.1 in Bakersfield), KLHC (Punjabi Radio USA), KEAL (Radio Lazer 106.5), KAXL, KTQX, KRHM-LP (La Redencion), and KFHL.

== Transportation ==
=== Highways ===
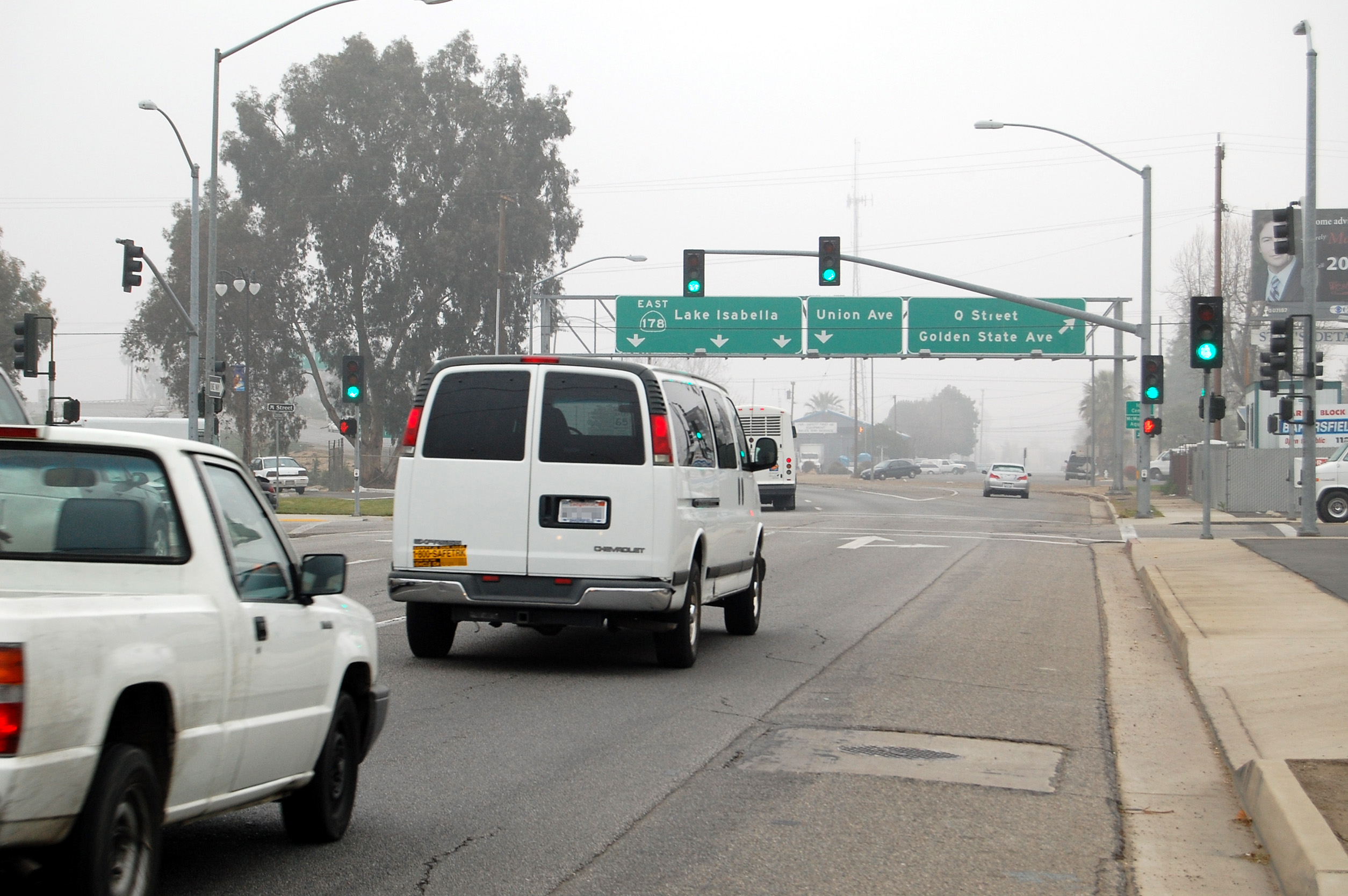
California State Route 178 at M Street near downtown Bakersfield on a foggy day

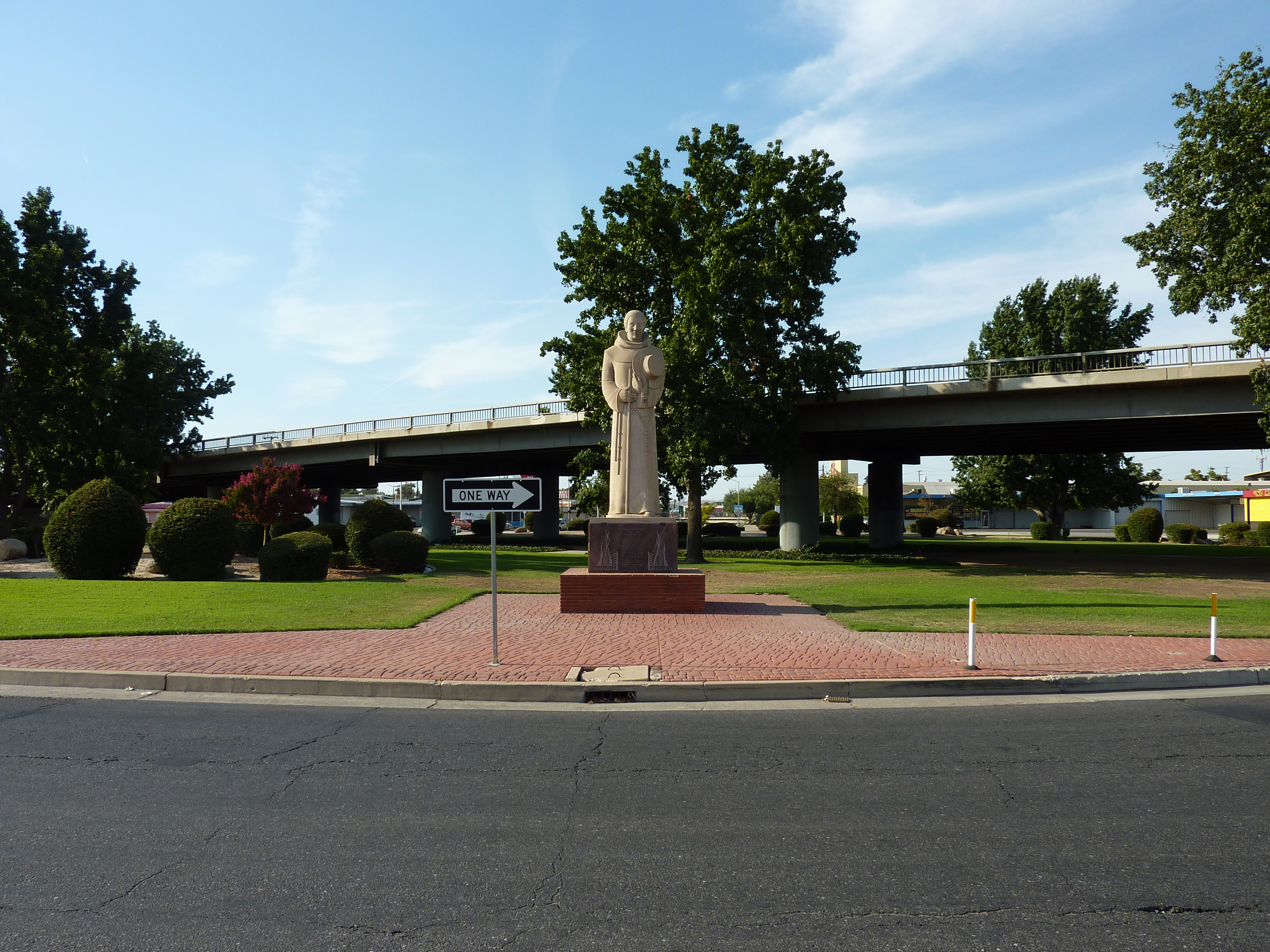
Garces Circle

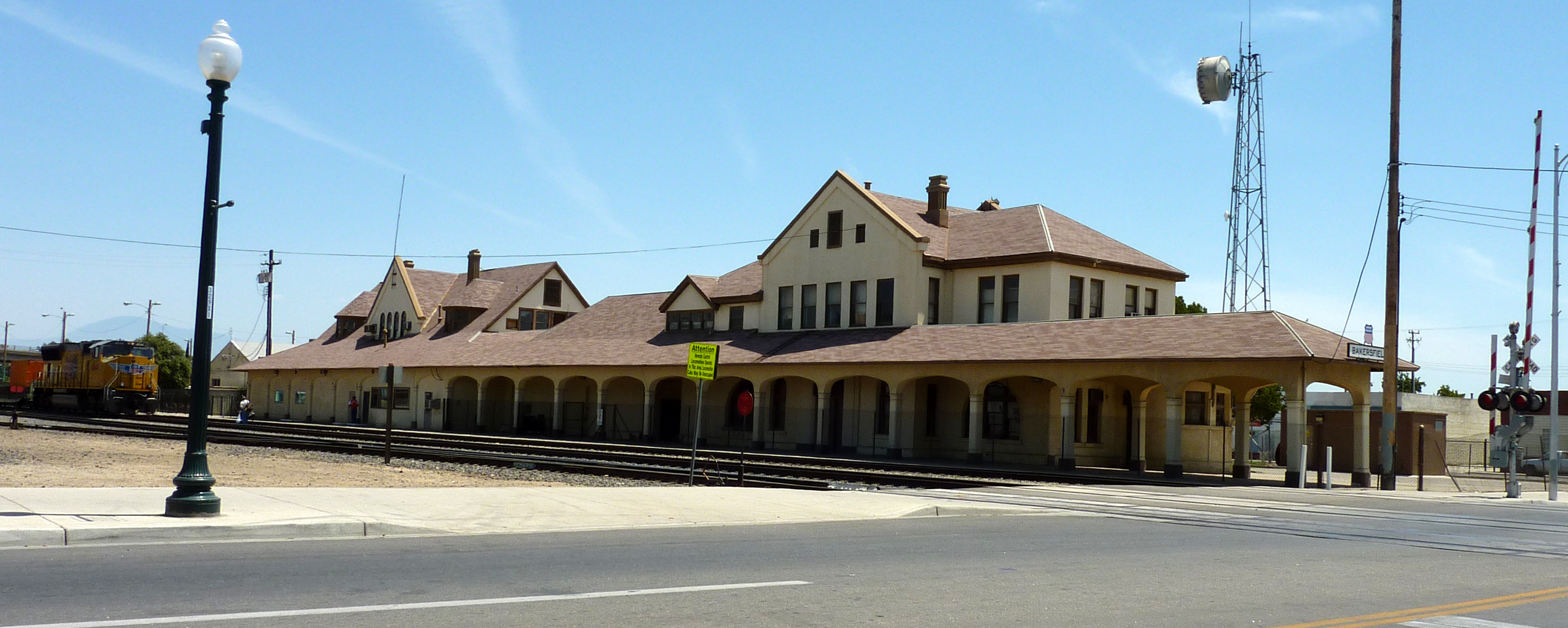
The old Southern Pacific Railroad station, currently the crew change depot for north and southbound Union Pacific Railroad trains. Old Town Kern is located primarily around Baker Street, near the former town of Sumner. It competed to be the commercial downtown, eventually losing to the present location west of Old Town.

Bakersfield is serviced by an extensive highway network which includes three freeways. State Route 99 bisects Bakersfield from north to south. At the same time, State Route 58 exists as a freeway east of SR 99, serving the southeast part of the city and extending over the Tehachapi mountains to Tehachapi, Mojave, and Barstow. State Route 178 consists of a short segment of freeway that runs from a point near downtown to the northeastern part of the city, although there is currently no direct freeway connection between SR 99 and SR 178. Interstate 5 bypasses the city several miles to the west.

Bakersfield is also served by a short, unsigned, four-lane freeway called Alfred Harrell Highway. It was constructed between 1956 and 1958 and extends from China Grade Loop to Hart Park, a large recreation park in northeast Bakersfield. There is a two-lane expressway to the east of the park. This section was initially reserved to be converted to a four-lane freeway similar to the constructed western portion. If it were ever constructed, it would have two interchanges (at Morning Drive and Lake Ming Road) and would terminate at the SR 178 adopted alignment (not built).

Both SR 58 and SR 178 have planned extensions. The western extension of SR 58 is known as the Centennial Corridor, which will extend the freeway west to I-5. Included in the Centennial Corridor is the Westside Parkway, sometimes referred to by its formal name, the Kern River Freeway. This is a newer freeway which runs through western Bakersfield, on a route parallel to the Kern River and Stockdale Highway. The western extension of SR 178 is known as the Crosstown Freeway/SR 178 Connection, although it was formerly known as the Centennial Corridor before that name was moved to SR 58. It is planned to connect SR 178 to the Westside Parkway.

There is a proposed network of beltways. Two beltways are being considered in Bakersfield. The West Beltway would run north–south from Seventh Standard Road to Taft Highway. It will run parallel to Heath Road to the north and parallel to South Allen Road to the south. A future extension would connect the West Beltway to SR 99 and I-5, providing a bypass to Bakersfield. The South Beltway would run east–west from SR 58 to I-5. From SR 58, it would run south, parallel to Comanche Drive until Taft Highway. From there, the freeway would turn west and run parallel to Taft Highway until terminating at I-5.

A future extension would extend the freeway north to SR 178 and terminate at Alfred Harrell Highway. Bakersfield also envisioned Caltrans building a North Beltway as the western extension of SR 58, but this has been withdrawn in favor of the Centennial Corridor.

Most of Bakersfield's major streets are six-lane divided roads with bike lanes, with most streets in the city having proper lane signage for bicycle traffic but little to no protection from vehicle traffic. Despite the city's relatively flat topography and grid-like street system, only around 2,782 bike commuters exist, as estimated in 2013, around 0.7% of its total population then.

Newer neighborhoods on the outskirts of the city, previously surrounded by two-lane farm roads, are prompting more large, divided roads to be built to help ease the increase in traffic that has resulted from the rise in population. Many developers choose to widen the roads that connect these neighborhoods at their own discretion, which can cause a major road to widen and narrow repeatedly over a short distance (Allen Road and Panama Lane are prime examples).

Since the Bakersfield city limit boundaries are not uniform, this can cause Kern County "islands" to exist within Bakersfield. The county of Kern may choose not to upgrade a road while the city of Bakersfield does improve a road, which can cause traffic congestion to increase (Calloway Drive from the Westside Parkway north to Rosedale Highway best exemplifies this disparity).

Bakersfield is currently one of the largest cities in the U.S. that is not directly linked to an Interstate highway. SR 99 and SR 58 have been considered for conversion to Interstates. SR 99 would be a new Interstate signed either as Interstate 7 or Interstate 9, while SR 58 would be an extension of I-40, which currently terminates in Barstow. In 2005, SR 99 was added to the FHWA list of high-priority corridors as "California farm to market route" and designated a Future Interstate.

Garces Memorial Traffic Circle, informally known as Garces Circle or just "the Circle," is a traffic circle in Bakersfield. The traffic circle is located at the intersection of Chester Avenue, Golden State Avenue (State Route 204), and 30th Street. The Circle was built circa 1932 as a part of US 99. A large sculpture of Francisco Garces was erected inside the circle in 1939.

=== Bus ===
Bakersfield is served by Golden Empire Transit. Eighteen routes are operated, the majority of which serve the urbanized portion of the county which includes the city of Bakersfield. Bakersfield is also served by Kern Transit, which connects Bakersfield with other communities in Kern County. Intercity bus providers in Bakersfield include Amtrak Thruway, Greyhound, Flixbus, Orange Belt Stages, National Charter Bus, Intercalifornias, TUFESA, and Fronteras del Norte.

The privately owned Airport Valet Express used to offer daily service between Bakersfield and LAX via a connection at the Van Nuys FlyAway bus station. However, they suspended service during the 2020 pandemic and have not yet announced a reopening date.

=== Rail ===
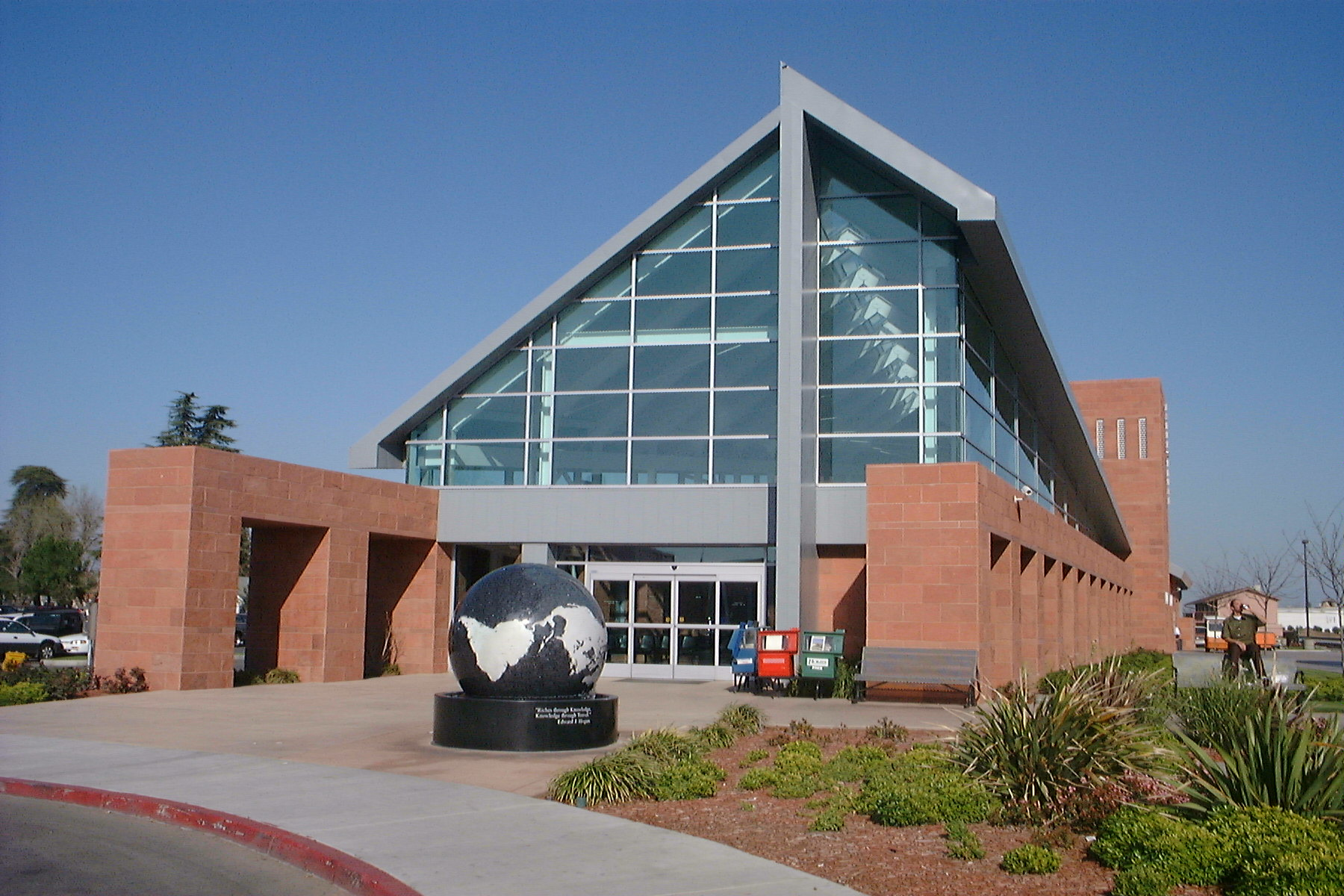
Amtrak station

For freight, Bakersfield is served directly by two class-1 railroads, Union Pacific, and BNSF. North of the city, each railroad uses its own rail lines; south of the city, they share a line owned by Union Pacific. The route travels over Tehachapi Pass (and through the Tehachapi Loop). There are several spur lines in and around Bakersfield. The majority are operated by the San Joaquin Valley Railroad, owned by Genesee & Wyoming.

Passenger service is provided by the Gold Runner, operated by Amtrak California. The Bakersfield Amtrak station is located downtown, at the intersection of S Street and Truxtun Avenue. The city is the route's southern terminus; passenger trains are normally prohibited from traveling through the Tehachapi Loop to Los Angeles. There are five Amtrak Thruway routes, which connect passengers to destinations west, south, and east. Kern Transit also uses the station as one of its hubs, connecting passengers to regions throughout Kern County. A station for Bakersfield is planned as part of the California High-Speed Rail system.

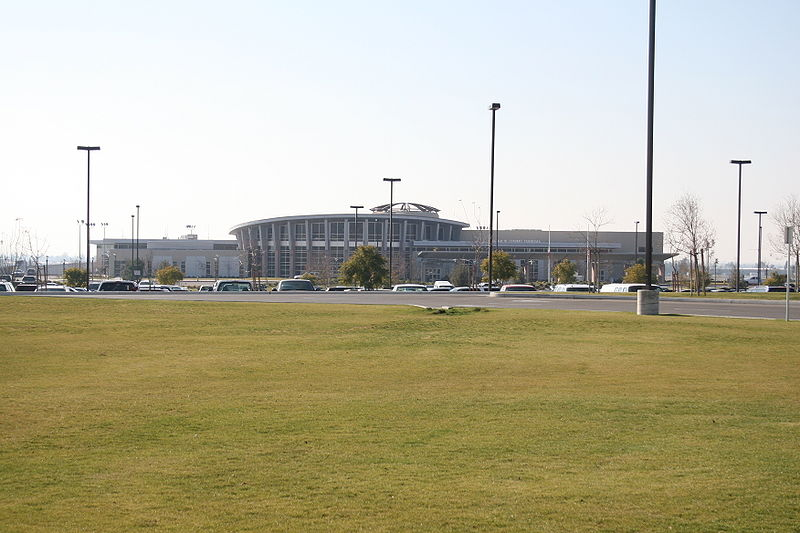
Meadows Field

=== Airport ===
Meadows Field Airport in Bakersfield was rebuilt and dedicated as the William M. Thomas Terminal in 2012.

Also located at the Airport are the Hall Medivac Helicopter, International Flight Training Academy (a subsidiary of Japan's ANA Airlines), SRT Helicopter Flight School, and numerous other aviation mechanics and technicians. However, IFTA has suspended operations in March 2014.

== Sites of interest ==
The following is a list of sites of interest in and around Bakersfield:

- Bakersfield Sign (Central)
- Beale Memorial Clock Tower (Central)
- Buck Owens Crystal Palace (Central)
- Fox Theater (Downtown)
- Kern County Museum (Central)
- Kern Veterans Memorial (Downtown)
- Padre Hotel (Downtown)
- Mill Creek (Downtown)
- The Park at River Walk (Southwest)

== In popular culture ==
Bakersfield appears in the 1997 role-playing video game Fallout under the name of Necropolis.

It was the setting for the short-lived, early 1990s sitcom Bakersfield P.D. as well as the 2010s sitcom Baskets.

== Sister cities ==
Bakersfield has six sister cities, as designated by Sister Cities International:

- Bucheon, Gyeonggi-do, South Korea
- Minsk, Belarus (Inactive since June 1999)
- Wakayama, Japan (July 14, 1961)
- Cixi, Zhejiang, China
- Santiago de Querétaro, Querétaro, Mexico
- Amritsar, Punjab, India
- Ciudad De Salta, Salta, Argentina

== See also ==
- Kern Power Plant – Former power station in the United States
- List of U.S. cities with large Hispanic populations
