= Bakersfield Department of Public Works =

Public works department for Bakersfield, California

Agency overview
- Preceding agencies: Street Department; Sanitation Department; Building Maintenance; Fleet Services
- Jurisdiction: Bakersfield, California
- Headquarters: City Hall South
- Annual budget: $695 million (2023-24)
- Agency executive: Gregg Strakaluse, Public Works Director
- Website: bakersfieldcity.us/cityservices/pubwrks

The Bakersfield Department of Public Works is a department of city of Bakersfield, California. It is responsible for a variety of city functions including: road maintenance and construction, waste water and sewer treatment, and vehicle maintenance. It is headquartered in City Hall South.

The department was formed out of a large merger of several smaller departments. These were: Street Department, Sanitation Department, Building Maintenance, and Fleet Services. As a result, it became the largest department in the city, based on its budget. In 2010, the department had a budget of $94 million. This figure does not include projects managed by Thomas Roads Improvement Program (TRIP, a division of this department).

== Major Accomplishments ==
Some of the major accomplishments of the Department of Public Works.

=== Kern River Reconstruction ===
In 1976, Bakersfield purchased all water rights (about 1/3 of the water through the First Point of Measurement, near Gordon's Ferry) and property from Tenneco West related to the Kern River. This essentially made the city in charge of the assets used in the management of the river including: weirs (used to divert water from the river into a canal), floodgates, measuring stations, etc. At acquisition, almost all the assets in the river were in a state of disrepair. Some of the weirs were lined with boulders, others with sandbags. The first point of measurement was a cable across the river where a measuring device could be placed and the second point of measurement had completely washed away.

In 1977 the Department of Public Works, began a long term project which would rebuild all of the infrastructure. It would be the largest construction/reconstruction effort in the history of the Kern River. In addition to rebuilding existing infrastructure, other construction projects were carried out. These include constructing new weirs and the "2,800 Acre Water Bank", and inter-basin levee system. Most projects were completed in 1983, but the Second Point of Measurement was not finished until 1985.

=== Wastewater Treatment Plant No. 3 expansion ===
In the early 2000s, Bakersfield was nearing the capacity for wastewater treatment. The city had two plants, which were Treatment Plant No. 2 and Treatment Plant No. 3. At the time, Plant 3 had room for expansion. As a result, in 2004, plans were started for the doubling of the capacity of the plant, from 16 million US gallons (61,000 m^{3}) per day to 32 million US gallons (120,000 m^{3}) per day. It would become the largest project in Bakersfield's history (by capital dollars) at $234 million. An additional $3 million were spent on installation of solar panels to offset future energy cost. Some of the treated water from the plant will be used to irrigate the adjacent 170-acre (0.69 km^{2}) Bakersfield Sports Village.

=== Westside Parkway ===
Since 1980, California Department of Transportation (Caltrans) has tried to construct a freeway through west Bakersfield which would eventually connect State Route 58 with Interstate 5. Named the Kern River Freeway, the project had opposition with the city over the eastern (SR 58) connection. Caltrans would drop the eastern connection and give the remaining 8-mile (13 km) segment to the city. Since that time, Caltrans has restarted the eastern segment while the city constructs the remaining freeway.

The Westside Parkway is the largest freeway project undertaken by the city. It has a total estimated construction cost of $250 million, which would make it the city's largest construction project. It is a four to six-lane freeway on 8-lane right-of-way, constructed to Interstate standards. There will be five interchanges, four in the first construction phase. The project also includes a 1 3/4 arterial extension. The roadway will be six lanes and elevated over most of its route. Construction of the initial phase, which includes all but the last two miles (3 km) of freeway and one interchange, is expected to be completed by late 2012.

== Thomas Roads Improvement Program ==
In 2005, Bakersfield would receive an over $600 million earmark from the Federal Government for transportation projects throughout the city. In addition, both the state and local government would also contribute funds for other projects. Because of the size of many of the projects (several are typically carried out by state or federal agencies), it was decided to create a department specifically for the design and construction of the projects. The Thomas Roads Improvement Program (TRIP) was created for that purpose. It was named after Bill Thomas, the congressman responsible for obtaining the federal funds.

Between 2005 and 2018, the agency will be responsible for 10 projects and one route adoption. These include: Westside Parkway (new 6 1/4-mile, 4 to 6 lane freeway built to interstate standards), Mohawk Street extension (1 3/4-mile 6-lane arterial extension), SR 178 freeway extension (2 new interchanges, 3 1/2-mile freeway extension), and North Beltway (2-lane to 4-lane highway conversion, 6 miles). It was briefly in charge of the Centennial Corridor (Westside Parkway to SR 58 freeway connection with freeway-to-freeway interchange), but the project was transferred to the California Department of Transportation (Caltrans).

In total, the agency is responsible for:

- 10 miles of new freeways
- 1 3/4 miles of new arterials
- 15 miles of road widening
- 8 new grade separate freeway-to-local interchanges
- 1 freeway-to-local interchange reconstruction and expansion
- 2 local interchanges

== External sources ==
- Bakersfield Department of Public Works
- Thomas Roads Improvement Program (TRIP)
