= Kern Power Plant =

Former power station in the United States

- Country: United States
- Location: Bakersfield, California
- Coordinates: 35°22′46″N 119°5′43″W
- Status: Defunct
- Decommission date: 1986
- Owner: Pacific Gas and Electric

Thermal power station
- Primary fuel: Oil

Kern Power Plant was a former power station located in Bakersfield, California, that was operational until 1986. During its implosion in August 2013, shrapnel injured five bystanders, including one man whose leg was severed.
