= Bakersfield Business Conference =

The Bakersfield Business Conference is a political and business conference held in Bakersfield, California. It was originally held every year, but since 2005 is held every five years or so (6 years elapsed between the conferences of 2010 and 2016).

== History ==
The conference was first organized by George Martin, then the managing general partner of the local law firm Borton, Petrini and Conron. Since then it has hosted four U.S. Presidents (Gerald Ford, Jimmy Carter, Ronald Reagan, and George H. W. Bush); world leaders such as Margaret Thatcher, Helmut Schmidt, and F. W. de Klerk; and other well-known people, such as astronaut Neil Armstrong.

From 1985 to 1991, the conference was held at the Stockdale Country Club. From 1992 onward, it has been held on the grounds of California State University, Bakersfield.

== Women’s Conference ==
Since 1989 (the Year of the Woman), Bakersfield has also been home to the Bakersfield Women's Business conference, an annual expo focused on women in business and government.
