= Kern Branch, Beale Memorial Library =

- Kern Branch, Baker Branch Library
- U.S. National Register of Historic Places
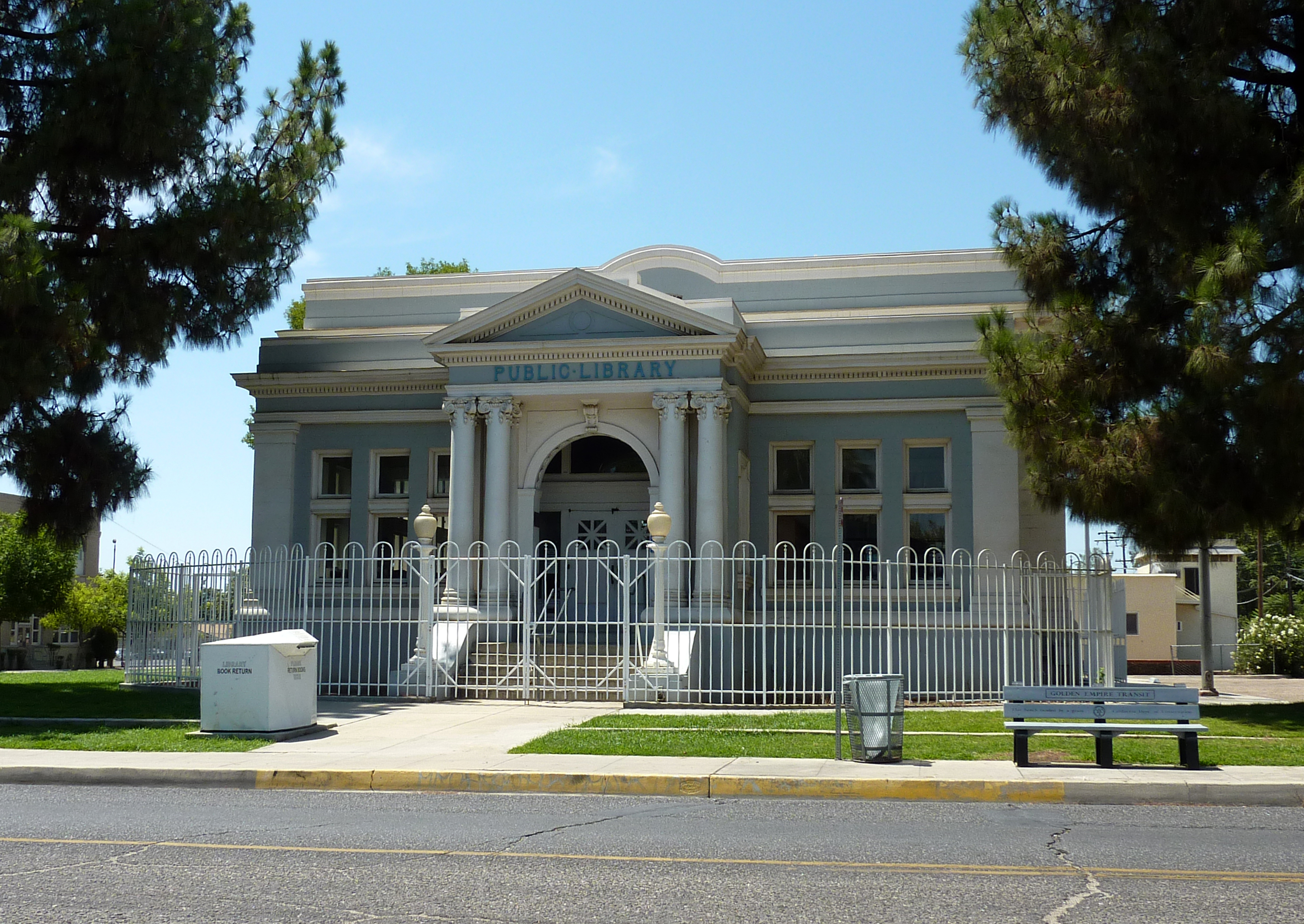

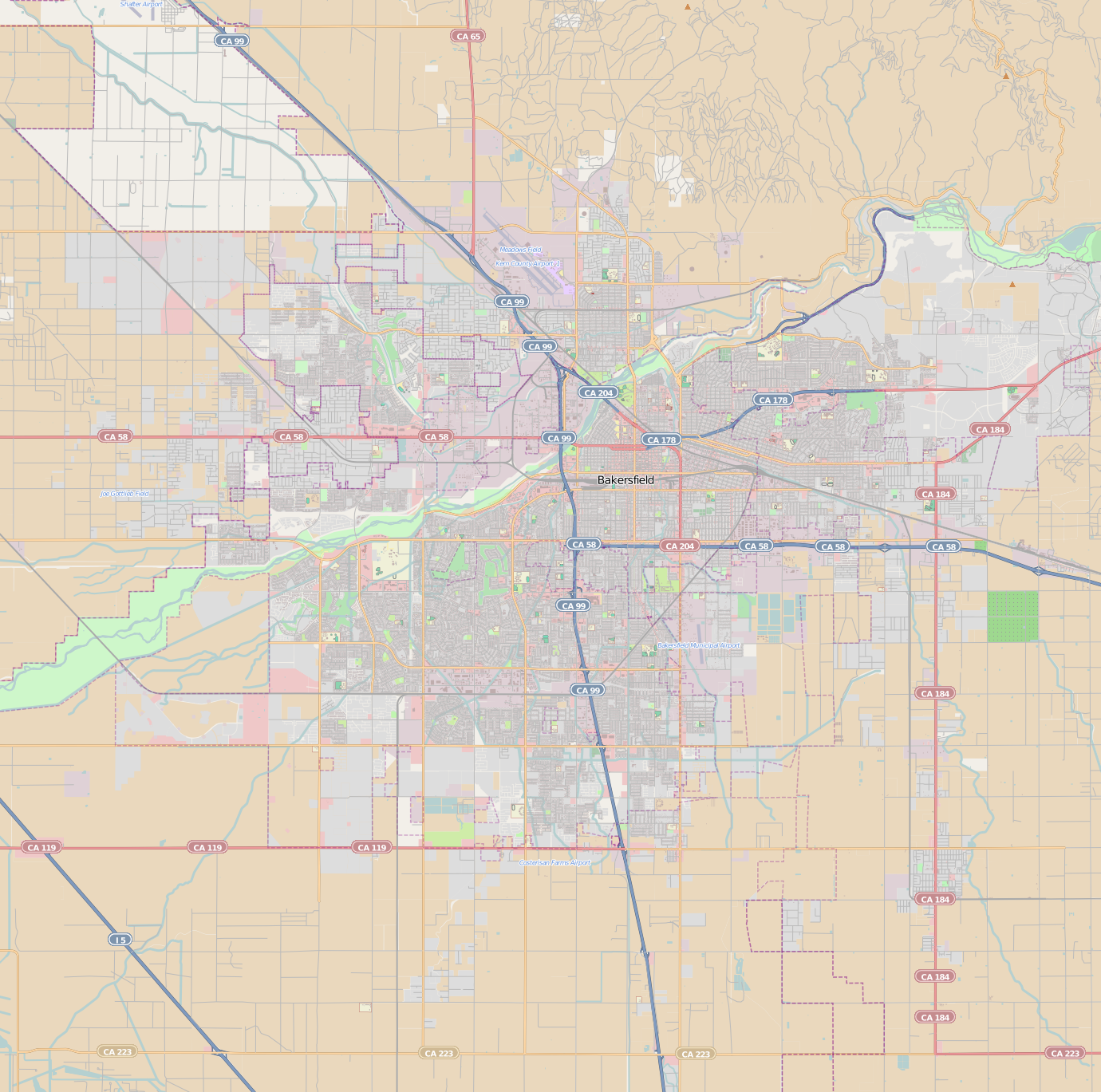
- Location within Bakersfield, California Location within California Location within the United States
- Location: 1400 Baker St., Bakersfield, California
- Coordinates: 35°23′1″N 118°59′24″W
- Area: 0.5 acres (0.20 ha)
- Built: 1913–15
- Architect: Clark, O. L.
- Architectural style: Classical Revival, Beaux-Arts
- NRHP reference No.: 81000150
- Added to NRHP: April 1, 1981

The Baker Street Library, is a library located at 1400 Baker St. in Bakersfield, California. The library was constructed from 1913 to 1915 and replaced Bakersfield's original library building. Architect O. L. Clark designed the building in the Classical Revival style; the library is the only surviving building designed by Clark in Bakersfield. The library is designed as a central block with two wings at the east and west ends. The library's main entrance is located on the east wing; the entrance is a portico supported by columns and topped with a pediment and a frieze reading "PUBLIC LIBRARY". The ornate interior decorations incorporate classical and Renaissance themes.

The library was added to the National Register of Historic Places on April 1, 1981.

== See also ==
- Bakersfield Register of Historic Places and Areas of Historic Interest
- California Historical Landmarks in Kern County, California
- National Register of Historic Places listings in Kern County, California
