= KKXX-FM =

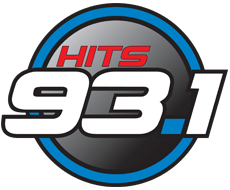
- Shafter, California; United States
- Broadcast area: Bakersfield, California
- Frequency: 93.1 MHz
- Branding: Hits 93.1

Programming
- Format: Top 40 (CHR)

Ownership
- Owner: American General Media
- Sister stations: KEBT, KERN, KGEO, KGFM, KISV

History
- First air date: 1977 (as KXHA)
- Former call signs: KXHA (10/17/90-4/8/95); KLYD (4/8/95-7/8/97); KSAN (7/8/97-12/11/97); KCOO (12/11/97-3/20/02); KRFR (3/20/02-9/20/04)

Technical information
- Licensing authority: FCC
- Facility ID: 35953
- Class: A
- ERP: 4,000 watts
- HAAT: 123 meters (404 feet)
- Transmitter coordinates: 35°28′21″N 119°01′40″W

Links
- Public license information: Public file; LMS
- Webcast: Listen Live
- Website: hits931fm.com

KKXX-FM (93.1 MHz, "Hits 93.1") is a radio station broadcasting a Top 40 (CHR) music format. KKXX-FM is licensed to Shafter, California, and serves the Bakersfield, California area. The station is owned by American General Media. The station's studios are located at Easton Business Complex in southwest Bakersfield, and its transmitter is located just north of Oildale.

From the late 1970s through the early 2000s, under several owners, KKXX was one of the most popular radio stations in Bakersfield and Kern County for youth oriented music.

== History ==
KKXX-FM went on the air in 1977 at 107.9 FM and was owned by Buck Owens Productions. Its transmitter is located on top of Mount Adelaide, northeast of Bakersfield. At the time Owens owned both KKXX and KUZZ located at 550 on the AM dial. Under Owens, KKXX was programmed as an adult contemporary/Top 40 station well into the 1980s. During that time it sat at the top of the ratings in Bakersfield. In 1988, Owens dumped the KKXX call letters and format and moved his country station KUZZ to 107.9. KUZZ was now on both AM and FM. He did this because its AM was losing listeners to the new American Country KAMM at 105.3. In May 1988 KAMM picked up the old KKXX calls and dumped country and brought back the KKXX Top 40 sound Kern County. Before KAMM there was KZAY at 105.3 in the early 1980s.

=== Frequency changes ===
A few years earlier, in 1982, KQXR ("Q94 FM"), which was located at 94.1 FM, went on the air. It offered the same Hot/AC format that KKXX had under Buck Owens' ownership. In the summer of 1988, Mondosphere re-tooled the station, calling it Power 105. It began to reflect its growing Latino listenership by rotating more dance, R&B, and freestyle songs into its playlist, making it one of the earliest examples of the Rhythmic CHR format. While KKXX still played the Top 40 hits each week, the playlist tended to shy away from artists like Rod Stewart and Elton John, and included acts like Salt-N-Pepa, Stevie B. and Lisa Lisa & Cult Jam. KKXX was also a long-time affiliate of the "Rick Dees Weekly Top 40". The nationally syndicated countdown show ran on Power 105, and then later on X 96.5 from 1988 until 2001. KKXX also carried "Casey's Top 40", hosted by veteran personality Casey Kasem from 1989 until 1998.

=== Peak ===
With its re-tooled format, KKXX remained Bakersfield's most popular non-country radio station well into the 1990s. But by 1996, music had changed. Top 40 was a radio format in decline, and the scene was ripe for a shakeup on the radio dial. During KKXX's greatest period of success, now defunct rival KQXR, and its parent company American General Media, had been undergoing many changes. "Q94 FM" had been renamed KERN-FM, and had switched to a moderately successful Oldies format. Then in 1997, AGM launched "Kiss 94.1". Its Hip Hop & R&B format came in stark contrast to the mainstream pop music that KKXX had been playing at the time. 94.1, under the new call letters KISV, began moving up in the ratings quite rapidly. In response, Mondosphere Broadcasting once again changed the frequency of "Bakersfield's Hit Music Station". After 9 years at 105.3, KKXX moved to 96.5 FM as the new "X96.5". The smooth jazz format located at KSMJ 96.5 was moved to 98.5. The oldies at 98.5 were moved to 105.3. They dumped smooth jazz in 2000 and made 98.5 KDFO classic rock. 105.3 was replaced with KKDJ, or "Star 105.3", which began as an Oldies format and later morphed into Adult Contemporary. Fans of the old station thought it simply disappeared, which served to boost the ratings of "Kiss 94.1".

=== Decline and rebirth ===
In 2000, Clear Channel Communications bought the station from Mondosphere, and relabeled it "96.5 KISS-FM". Almost immediately Clear Channel sent American General Media a cease & desist order, insisting that it stop using "Kiss" as a moniker for KISV. AGM fought back and ultimately lost, renaming its station the "New Hot 94.1, the Rhythm Of the Valley". With victory in hand, Clear Channel began re-tooling KKXX once more, to mirror the Top 40 format of KIIS-FM in Los Angeles. Despite the publicity from the "Kiss" dispute and a dial and format change, it wasn't enough to pique the public's interest in KKXX. In 2004, the calls were changed to KBKO-FM, and the format switched to country (96.5 FM has since changed formats again, and is now known as KPSL-FM). American General Media now holds the KKXX call letters, which sit at 93.1 FM, which for four years hosted the "Pirate Radio" format, which is similar to the "Jack-FM" format in other markets. On July 20, 2009, at midnight, the station abruptly dropped the Pirate Radio format and began stunting, playing nonstop construction sounds. On July 20, 2009, at 4pm, the station revealed its new format as a Top 40 (CHR) format and the station rebranded as Hot Hits 93.1 "Bakersfield's Hot Hit Station."

== Airstaff ==
KKXX has been home to several notable air personalities including Kris Kohls, DJ Jeff Duran and Preston Nash of Dope fame. The current weekday line-up on this station includes the syndicated morning show JohnJay and Rich on mornings, and Snacks, who is on mid-days.
