= KRWI (FM) =

- Wofford Heights, California; United States
- Broadcast area: Lake Isabella
- Frequency: 98.1 MHz
- Branding: Rewind 98.1 & 93.5

Programming
- Format: Hot adult contemporary
- Affiliations: Compass Media Networks

Ownership
- Owner: Hill Broadcasting
- Sister stations: KVLI; KKBB; KLLY; KNZR-FM; KNZR

History
- First air date: 2015
- Former call signs: KTOX-FM (2015–2018)
- Call sign meaning: Rewind

Technical information
- Licensing authority: FCC
- Facility ID: 198809
- Class: A
- ERP: 77 watts
- HAAT: 822.4 meters (2,698 ft)
- Transmitter coordinates: 35°42′20.7″N 118°33′34.6″W
- Translator: 93.5 K228GB (Lake Isabella)

Links
- Public license information: Public file; LMS
- Webcast: Listen live
- Website: rewind981.com

KRWI (98.1 FM) is a commercial radio station licensed to Wofford Heights, California, United States, and serves the Lake Isabella area of Central California. The station is owned by Hill Broadcasting and airs a hot adult contemporary format.

Programming is also heard on FM translator K228GB at 93.5 MHz in Lake Isabella.

== History ==
The station began testing its new transmitter and studios in 2015. It was assigned the call letters KTOX-FM by the Federal Communications Commission on December 10, 2015. The station changed its call sign to KRWI on October 30, 2018. The change in call letters preceded the station flipping its format on November 1, 2018, from alternative "Toxic 98.1" to 1990s and 2000s hits as Rewind 98.1.

In October 2023, Danny and Kait Hill's Hill Broadcasting purchased KRWI from Rubin Broadcasting for $250,000. Hill Broadcasting also owns "Outlaw Country 103.7" 1140 KVLI/103.7 K279CZ in Lake Isabella, California.
