= KVLI =

Radio station in Lake Isabella, California

- Lake Isabella, California; United States
- Frequency: 1140 kHz
- Branding: Outlaw Country 1140

Programming
- Format: Classic country

Ownership
- Owner: Danny Hill and Kait Hill; (Hill Broadcasting)
- Sister stations: KKBB; KNZR; KNZR-FM; KRWI

History
- First air date: July 15, 1977
- Former call signs: KVLI (1978–1997); KQAB (1997–2011)

Technical information
- Licensing authority: FCC
- Facility ID: 35857
- Class: D
- Power: 1,000 watts (days only)
- Transmitter coordinates: 35°37′55.8″N 118°28′34.3″W
- Translator: 103.7 K279CZ (Lake Isabella)

Links
- Public license information: Public file; LMS
- Website: outlawcountry1037.com

KVLI (1140 AM) is a commercial radio station licensed to Lake Isabella, California, United States. The station is owned by Danny and Kait Hill, through Hill Broadcasting, and broadcasts a Classic Country radio format known as "Outlaw Country".

Programming is heard around the clock on FM translator K279CZ at 103.7 MHz in Lake Isabella.

== History ==
The station signed on the air on July 15, 1977. It featured a variety format that included top 40, middle of the road (MOR), and country music.

In August 2014, Robert J. Bohn and Katherine M. Bohn sold KVLI and sister station KRVQ-FM to Alta Sierra Broadcasting, LLC for $300,000. However, the transaction triggered a complaint to the Federal Communications Commission (FCC) which held up the deal for three years. Calvary Chapel Costa Mesa, licensee of KWVE-FM, alleged that a time brokerage agreement (TBA) between the sellers and Alta Sierra constituted an unauthorized transfer of control because KVLI and KRVQ-FM had no staff on premises.

The FCC agreed, levying an $8,000 fine against the Bohns in a consent decree. The penalty was later reduced to $6,000, and the sale closed in July 2017.

Effective July 6, 2021, Alta Sierra Broadcasting sold KVLI and the construction permit for translator K279CZ to Danny and Kait Hill's Hill Broadcasting for $25,000.
