= KNZR =

KNZR may refer to:

- KNZR (AM), a radio station (1560 AM) licensed to serve Bakersfield, California, United States
- KNZR-FM, a radio station (97.7 FM) licensed to serve Shafter, California
