= KCHJ =

KCHJ may refer to:

- KCHJ (AM), a radio station (1010 AM) licensed to serve Delano, California, United States
- KQKZ, a radio station (92.1 FM) licensed to serve Bakersfield, California, which held the call sign KCHJ-FM from 2016 to 2019
