= KBFP =

KBFP may refer to:

- KBFP (AM), a radio station (800 AM) licensed to Bakersfield, California, United States
- KBFP-FM, a radio station (105.3 FM) licensed to Delano, California, United States
