= KNZR-FM =

Radio station in Shafter, California

- Shafter, California; United States
- Broadcast area: Bakersfield metropolitan area
- Frequency: 97.7 MHz
- Branding: KNZR AM1560 & FM97.7

Programming
- Format: Conservative talk radio
- Affiliations: Fox News Radio; Premiere Networks; Salem Radio Network; Westwood One

Ownership
- Owner: Frequency Media; (Frequency Broadcasting Inc.)
- Sister stations: KKBB; KLLY; KNZR

History
- First air date: March 3, 1978
- Former call signs: KQEZ (1978–1979); KMGN (1979–1983); KLYD-FM (1983–1988); KKBB (1988–1994); KZBA (1994–1996); KRME (1996–2001); KSMJ (2001–2013)

Technical information
- Licensing authority: FCC
- Facility ID: 8109
- Class: A
- ERP: 4,100 watts
- HAAT: 121 meters (397 ft)
- Transmitter coordinates: 35°27′32.8″N 119°1′16.4″W
- Repeater: 1560 KNZR (Bakersfield)

Links
- Public license information: Public file; LMS
- Webcast: Listen live
- Website: knzr.com

KNZR-FM (97.7 FM) is a commercial radio station licensed to Shafter, California, United States, and serving the Bakersfield market. Owned by Frequency Media. KNZR-FM simulcasts a conservative talk radio format with KNZR (1560 AM), with studios on Pegasus Drive in Bakersfield.

KNZR-FM's transmitter is sited off Warehouse Road in Oildale.

== History ==
=== Early years ===
The station signed on the air on March 3, 1978. The original call sign was KQEZ. It carried an easy listening format of soft instrumentals and a few vocals per hour. The following year, it switched its call sign to KMGN, airing a country music format. The station was owned by Brandon-Dorsey Communications.

In 1986, Community Service Broadcasters took over as debtor in possession. The call letters switched to KKBB and the station featured an album rock sound, using NBC Radio's "The Source" young adult network for news and features. In 1996, the station switched to a Regional Mexican format as KRME, when it was owned by Spanish-language broadcaster Eduardo Caballero.

The station was assigned the KSMJ call letters by the Federal Communications Commission on February 6, 2001. As the call sign implied, the station carried a smooth jazz format.

=== Changes in ownership ===
Buckley Broadcasting acquired KSMJ in 2001. On November 22, 2011, KSMJ dropped its adult contemporary "Mix 97.7" format and began simulcasting KNZR (1560 AM), to give Bakersfield listeners the choice to hear the talk programming on KNZR on either AM or FM. KSMJ changed to its current KNZR-FM call sign on September 11, 2013.

In 2014, Buckley Broadcasting sold its California stations, including KNZR-AM-FM, to Alpha Media of Portland, Oregon. Alpha Media Chairman Larry Wilson said, "The Buckley clusters in California will be a great addition to the West Coast footprint. Bakersfield is a rich and vibrant city full of live and local opportunities." Alpha Media merged with Connoisseur Media on September 4, 2025.

On October 14, 2025, Connoisseur Media Announced the Bakersfield cluster had been sold to Danny and Kait Hill’s Frequency Media.

=== Racial controversy ===
On January 18, 2018, midday host Jaz McKay was told that due to budgetary concerns he would be replaced the next week with Sean Hannity in the noon to 3pm slot which he had occupied for 14 years. McKay then took to social media and used derogatory language to describe Hispanic radio broadcasts in the area. McKay claimed the large number of Spanish language radio stations in Bakersfield made it increasingly difficult for English speaking announcers to find employment. At 45.5%, Hispanics comprise the largest demographic group in Bakersfield. On January 24, McKay’s time slot was indeed taken over by the syndicated radio show from Sean Hannity. On the same day, it was also reported that McKay’s fellow conservative talk show host Inga Barks was, for unspecified reasons, no longer associated with the station. McKay was later hired for the midday time slot on KERN in December 2018.

== Programming ==
KNZR-AM-FM's weekday schedule features one local talk show heard in late mornings, hosted by Terry Maxwell, a former Bakersfield City Council member and restaurateur. The rest of the weekday schedule is nationally syndicated conservative talk shows.

== Former programming ==
- The station was once home to Chris Squires. He had been Program Director for KKXX-FM, KRAB, KKDJ, and KSMJ when they were owned by Mondosphere Broadcasting, and was known as on-air name "Spydee". He was also program director for Mix 97-7.
- Kristin Jacobs was former;y on the mid-day shift, and had been on the radio in Bakersfield doing the same shift on Clear Channel-owned KKDJ (when it was "K-LITE 105.3").
- Erik Daniels was on in the afternoons, and had been a Buckley Radio employee for many years, also serving on KLLY, and doing production director duties for the company.
- The Beacon Radio program with Austin Harris once aired Sunday mornings.
- Weekends Fill/In included Rogers Brandon.
- Brent Michaels hosted the morning show until August 22, 2008.
- The syndicated morning program The Bob and Sheri Show debuted September 2008.
- The station carried the syndicated John Tesh radio program on weekday evenings and Sunday mornings until January 2011. He is now on KBFP-FM
