= KKDJ =

KKDJ may refer to:

- KKDJ-CD, a low-power television station (channel 18, virtual 8) licensed to serve Visalia, California, United States; see List of television stations in California
- KBFP-FM, a radio station (105.3 FM) licensed to serve Delano, California, which held the call sign KKDJ from 1998 to 2006
- KMJ-FM, a radio station (105.9 FM) licensed to serve Fresno, California, which held the call sign KKDJ from 1979 to 1996
- KIIS-FM, a radio station (102.7 FM) licensed to serve Los Angeles, California, which held the call sign KKDJ from 1971 to 1975
