= KWAC =

KWAC may refer to:

- Key Word Alongside Context, a modification of the KWIC concordance line format.
- KWAC (AM), a radio station (1490 AM) licensed to Bakersfield, California
