= KRJK =

American radio station

- Lamont, California; United States
- Broadcast area: Bakersfield, California
- Frequency: 97.3 MHz
- Branding: The Bull 97.3

Programming
- Language: English
- Format: Country music
- Affiliations: Premiere Networks

Ownership
- Owner: Buck Owens Broadcasting; (Buck Owens Production Company, Inc.)
- Sister stations: KCWR, KUZZ, KUZZ-FM

History
- First air date: September 30, 2011
- Call sign meaning: Bakersfield's Jack FM (old format)

Technical information
- Licensing authority: FCC
- Facility ID: 183302
- Class: A
- ERP: 2,000 watts
- HAAT: 171 meters (561 ft)
- Transmitter coordinates: 35°11′36″N 118°43′10″W

Links
- Public license information: Public file; LMS
- Webcast: Listen live
- Website: bull973.com

KRJK (97.3 FM, "The Bull 97.3") is a radio station licensed to Lamont, California, United States. The station is owned by Buck Owens Broadcasting (which is controlled by the estate of Buck Owens) via Buck Owens Production Company, Inc.

== History ==
In October 2009, Owens One Company, Inc., applied to the Federal Communications Commission (FCC) for a construction permit for a new broadcast radio station. The FCC granted this permit on May 5, 2010, with a scheduled expiration date of May 5, 2013. The new station was assigned call sign "KRJK" on September 20, 2011. The station began broadcast operations at 3 p.m. on September 29, 2011, carrying the small-market broadcast of Jack FM. It received its broadcast license on October 25, 2011.

On October 14, 2016, at Noon, KRJK flipped to country as "97.3 The Bull" (Now "The Bull 97.3" As Of 2022). The new format joins KUZZ/KUZZ-FM and KCWR in the Owens cluster and gives the company a monopoly on country music in the market, more than likely preventing a competitor from coming in to replace KVMX, which had flipped to Spanish ranchera music that July. KRJK will add the syndicated Bobby Bones Show for mornings starting Monday, October 17. Bones had also been carried by KVMX prior to its format change. KUZZ weekender Toni Marie will host middays, while KUZZ PD Brent Michaels adds those duties for the Bull as well. On September 29, 2017 Broadcast personality and Stand Comedian Keith Jones joined the Radio Announcer rotation working weekends and fill-ins for Middays with Toni Marie.
