= KIWI =

Coordinates: 35.321°N 119.708°W

- McFarland, California; United States
- Broadcast area: Bakersfield metropolitan area
- Frequency: 102.9 MHz
- Branding: Radio Lobo 102.9

Programming
- Format: Regional Mexican

Ownership
- Owner: Lotus Communications; (Lotus Bakersfield Corp.)
- Sister stations: KCHJ, KPSL-FM, KQKZ, KWAC

History
- First air date: 1989; 37 years ago

Technical information
- Licensing authority: FCC
- Facility ID: 8108
- Class: B1
- ERP: 25,000 watts
- HAAT: 98 meters (322 ft)
- Repeater: 96.5 KPSL-FM HD2 (Bakersfield)

Links
- Public license information: Public file; LMS
- Webcast: Listen Live
- Website: radiolobo.com

KIWI (102.9 FM, "Radio Lobo") is a commercial radio station licensed to McFarland, California, and broadcasting to the Bakersfield metropolitan area. The station is owned by Lotus Communications and the license is held by the Lotus Bakersfield Corporation. KIWI airs a regional Mexican radio format. Its studios are located in southwest Bakersfield.

KIWI has an effective radiated power (ERP) of 25,000 watts. The transmitter is off Blue Star Memorial Highway in Reward.

== Programming ==
Programming on this station includes Cascabel and Compania on mornings, Isidro Roman on mid-days and Victor Victor on afternoons.
