= KPSL-FM =

Radio station in Bakersfield, California

- Bakersfield, California; United States
- Broadcast area: Bakersfield, California
- Frequency: 96.5 MHz (HD Radio)
- Branding: Grupera 96.5

Programming
- Format: Regional Mexican
- Subchannels: HD2: Simulcast of KIWI

Ownership
- Owner: Lotus Communications; (Lotus Bakersfield Corp.)
- Sister stations: KCHJ, KIWI, KQKZ, KWAC

History
- First air date: August 24, 1963 (as KIFM)
- Former call signs: KIFM (1963–1975); KHIS (1976–1977); KHIS-FM (1977–1996); KSMJ (1996–1998); KKXX-FM (1998–2004); KBKO-FM (2004–2008); KDFO (2008); KBKO-FM (2008); KVMX (2008–2011)

Technical information
- Licensing authority: FCC
- Facility ID: 28847
- Class: B
- ERP: 50,000 watts
- HAAT: 152 meters (499 ft)
- Transmitter coordinates: 35°29′08″N 118°53′19″W

Links
- Public license information: Public file; LMS
- Webcast: Listen live
- Website: www.grupera965.com

KPSL-FM (96.5 FM) is a radio station broadcasting a Regional Mexican format. Licensed to Bakersfield, California, United States, the station serves the Bakersfield area. The station is currently owned by Lotus Communications.

== History ==
=== KIFM (1963–1975) ===
96.5 FM Bakersfield signed on-the-air on August 24, 1963, as KIFM. From 1966 to 1969 the KIFM format was Top 40. In 1969 the station was purchased by Faith Center, Glendale, California. The format was Christian. Part of the time the station simulcast with KHOF 99.5 Los Angeles. The call letters KIFM now belong to a radio station in West Sacramento.

=== KHIS/KHIS-FM (1976–1996) ===
In 1975, 96.5 FM was bought by the International Church of the Foursquare Gospel. On January 1, 1976, the call letters were changed to KHIS and to KHIS-FM on January 3, 1977, when the church bought 800 AM KUZZ and turned it into KHIS (now KBFP). KHIS-FM aired a religious/Contemporary Christian music format until December 27, 1996.

=== KSMJ (1996–1998) ===
On September 30, 1996, Foursquare sold KHIS-AM-FM to Hemisphere Broadcasting of Bakersfield for $2.65 million. On December 27, 1996, the call letters KHIS-FM were changed to KSMJ. KSMJ aired a smooth jazz music format branded as Smooth Jazz 96-5 KSMJ.

=== KKXX (1998–2004) ===
On July 2, 1998, KSMJ moved up the dial to 98.5 FM and radio station KKXX-FM moved from 105.3 FM to 96.5 FM alternating between a rhythmic top 40 and Top 40 music format until September 3, 2004. The station was branded as X96.5 and at the time was owned by Mondosphere Broadcasting. On August 16, 2000, Mondosphere Broadcasting was sold to Clear Channel Communications. Clear Channel relabeled KKXX-FM from X96.5 to 96.5 KISS-FM which was modeled after its sister station KIIS-FM in Los Angeles and also stated that no changes were expected at that time.

=== KBKO (2004–2008) ===
On September 3, 2004, the format was changed to country with the call sign changing to KBKO-FM. The station was branded as Big 96-5. Later, it was rebranded as 96-5 KBKO. On February 15, 2008, the KBKO-FM call letters and the country music format were briefly moved to 98.5 FM in a frequency swap with KDFO, a classic rock station which then became 96-5 The Fox. On Friday, June 20, 2008, the two stations were moved back to their previous frequencies after a four-month, swap.

=== KVMX (2008–2011) ===
On Tuesday, July 29, 2008, KBKO-FM was sold to Lotus Communications and the station began stunting before revealing the new format. At noon on August 5, 2008, the station announced a new classic hits format branded as 96.5 Max-FM. The new format was led off with "Start Me Up" by the Rolling Stones. On August 13, 2008, the KBKO-FM call sign was changed to KVMX.

=== KPSL-FM (2011–present) ===
On September 8, 2011, Lotus Communications made a frequency change to two of its stations, KVMX and KPSL-FM which swapped frequencies. KPSL-FM is now at 96.5 FM and is branded as Concierto 96.5 FM and KVMX is now at 92.1 FM. On July 31, 2018, KPSL-FM changed their format from Spanish adult hits to regional Mexican, branded as "La Ley 96.5".

On August 1, 2026, KPSL-FM changed their format from Spanish rhythmic to Regional Mexican, branded as "Grupera 96.5".

== Programming ==
Programming on this station includes Alex "El Genio" Lucas on mornings, Rosmar Vega on mid-days, El Fantasma on afternoons, and Concierto 96.5 Music overnights, and weekends. Show De Thalia is on Saturday evenings.
