= KRWI =

KRWI may refer to:

- Rocky Mount–Wilson Regional Airport (ICAO code KRWI)
- KRWI (FM), a radio station (98.1 FM) licensed to serve Wofford Heights, California, United States
