= KISV =

- Bakersfield, California; United States
- Broadcast area: Bakersfield metropolitan area
- Frequency: 94.1 MHz (HD Radio)
- Branding: Hot 94.1

Programming
- Format: Rhythmic contemporary
- Subchannels: HD2: "101.1 The Bounce" (Classic hip hop)

Ownership
- Owner: American General Media
- Sister stations: KEBT, KERN, KGEO, KGFM, KKXX-FM

History
- First air date: 1948
- Former call signs: KERN-FM (1948–1970); KLYD-FM (1970-1982); KQXR (1982-1989); KERN-FM (1989-1997)
- Call sign meaning: "Kiss of the Valley" (Original moniker was "KISS 94.1" until 2002, when it lost the rights to use the "KISS" name in a court case)

Technical information
- Licensing authority: FCC
- Facility ID: 18060
- Class: B
- ERP: 4,500 watts
- HAAT: 406 meters (1,332 ft)
- Transmitter coordinates: 35°26′16.8″N 118°44′25.3″W
- Translator: HD2: 101.1 K266CG (Bakersfield)

Links
- Public license information: Public file; LMS
- Webcast: Listen live HD2: Listen live
- Website: www.hot941.com HD2: www.bouncebako.com

KISV (94.1 FM, "Hot 94.1") is a commercial radio station in Bakersfield, California. It airs a rhythmic contemporary radio format, and is owned by American General Media. Its studios are in the Easton Business Complex in southwest Bakersfield.

KISV is a Class B FM station, with an effective radiated power (ERP) of 4,500 watts. Its transmitter is off Breckenridge Road, east of the city.

== History ==
=== KERN-FM ===
The station signed on the air in 1948. Its call sign was KERN-FM, the sister station to KERN 1410 AM (now KERI). KERN-AM-FM were CBS Radio network affiliates and were owned by the McClatchy Company, which published several California newspapers and owned other radio stations. In September 1962, McClatchy sold KERN-AM-FM to Radio, KERN Inc, owned by Roger H. Stoner, for $145,000.

The station was known in the 1980s as KQXR or Q94 FM. At that time it had a Top 40 format that leaned towards adult contemporary. After rhythmic KKXX 105.3FM beat it in the ratings, KQXR changed direction.

In 1989, the call letters returned to KERN-FM and it aired an oldies format as "94 Oldies." For the next eight years, the station played hits from the years 1955-1974. It featured nationally syndicated shows such as Cruisin' America with Cousin Brucie and Dick Clark's Rock, Roll & Remember. The oldies format performed fairly well in the Arbitron ratings, and in 1997, management decided on a younger format.

=== Rhythmic Contemporary KISV ===
The station was relaunched with a rhythmic contemporary format in 1997. It switched its call sign to KISV, representing the word "Kiss" and adding a V for "Valley," as in Central Valley, California, where Bakersfield is located. The station's slogan became "The All New KISS 94.1, The Rhythm Of The Valley."

In 2001, Clear Channel Communications (today's iHeartMedia) acquired KKXX, and the company sent a "cease and desist" order to KISV. Clear Channel demanded KISV stop using the trademarked "KISS" moniker because the company wanted that slogan for KKXX. During the court proceedings, KISV 94.1 dropped "Kiss" from its name in compliance. Its moniker changed to simply "94.1" for the duration of the fight against Clear Channel.

A federal judge agreed and in February 2002 Clear Channel won the case, and KISV was forced to change its moniker. Shortly thereafter, KISV held a contest to let the listeners decide what the new name of the station would be. The result of this contest was the station's new listener-chosen moniker: "HOT 94.1."

== Programming ==
Weekdays on KISV begin with Romeo on mornings. His show features Hollywood Trash. Program director J. Reed is on middays. His show features the 12 O' Clock Movie Match. In afternoon drive time, Randy is heard. His show features the 5 O'Clock Traffic Jam with D.J. Wreck in the Mix. Bootleg Kev in heard evenings, with show producer Nico Blitz.
