= Mary Margaret Revell =

American swimmer and runner (born 1937)

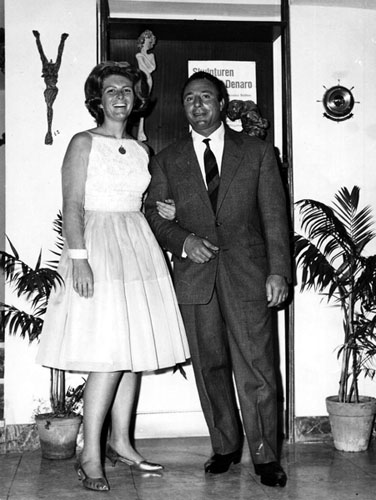
- Mary Margaret Revell (left) in 1963

Personal information
- Full name: Mary Margaret Revell Goodwin
- Nationality: United States
- Born: 1937 (age 88–89) Shafter, California, U.S.
- Education: Garces Memorial High School; Immaculate Heart College, Los Angeles
- Occupations: Swimmer, Runner, Local Historian
- Height: 5 ft 9 in (175 cm)
- Weight: 134 lb (61 kg) (1963)
- Relatives: Dennis Revell (brother); Maureen Reagan (sister-in-law)

Sport
- Sport: Long-distance swimming Long distance running

Mary Margaret Revell Goodwin (born c. 1937) is a former American long distance swimmer, distance runner and a local historian. She is noted for her long distance attempts in swimming which include the Strait of Mackinac (1960), Strait of Gibraltar (1962), Strait of Messina (1963), and Sea of Galilee (1964). She also holds records for running long distances such as being the first American to run across Japan (1985) and the Himalayas (1988). As of February 2022, she is a local historian and is making contributions to the War of 1812 and American Revolutionary War.

== Biography ==
Born c. 1937, Goodwin was raised in Shafter, California, by the Revell family which included her brother, Dennis, and father, J. H. Revell, a local dentist by profession. At the age of three, she started to learn swimming in the family backyard pool that was installed by her father. She had contracted polio and valley fever in her pre-teen years from which she recovered. At 14, she pursued her catholic education at Garces Memorial High School and graduated as the valedictorian of 1955 class. During this time, she was pressured to become a lawyer by her father, who denied her request to become an Olympic swimming athlete. She later attended Immaculate Heart College in Los Angeles from where she majored in history and political science.

=== Early swimming years ===
In the 1930s when Goodwin contracted Polio, it spread to her sister and a cousin as well. The cousin later passed away but Goodwin survived. Eventually, she developed pain on her legs and this caused her problems with bending her knee. On doctor's advice, she took to swimming in the Hollywood Roosevelt Hotel pool, located in Los Angeles to improve her leg. Spending many hours each day to swim in the pool, she carefully swam with her injured leg and also quickly learnt to swim for longer periods of time. These swim sessions made her realize about her capabilities of long-distance swimming. Next year on 1958, she attempted her first long distance swim from Malibu to Santa Monica.

In July 1958, Goodwin started open water swimming by covering the distance of Santa Monica Bay, Malibu, to Santa Monica. This successful attempt took her a time of 8 hours and 13 minutes. The following year, she attempted to cross the Catalina Channel, one of the Triple Crown of Open Water swimming, which stretches a distance of 25 mi (40 km) from Catalina island to mainland California. In this swim, she was to follow a guide boat but ended up following a different boat which changed her planned swimming path. This was followed by a change of plans where she would try to find the shore. On the way, she had an encounter with a shark. Eventually, she reached the shore of Palos Verdes where climbing a cliff and walking barefoot over tumbleweeds and bushes, she reached a farmhouse thereby contacting the rescue authorities who were searching her. This was her first unsuccessful attempt at open swimming. In July 1960, she crossed the Strait of Mackinac, a distance of 16 mi (26 km), which took her 7 hours and 28 minutes.

=== Bosphorus, Dardanelles, Gibraltar and Marmara swims ===
In July 1962, Goodwin crossed the Bosphorus strait, which connects the Black sea to the Sea of Marmara, in 1 hour and 33 minutes. This was a round trip of distance 3.7 mi (6.0 km). In the same month, she successfully swam the Dardanelles in a round trip, in 2 hours and 46 minutes, with 6 mi (9.7 km) distance covered. In the events leading up to the Dardanelles attempt, she walked for 7 hours with her swim crew to reach the swimming spot where she requested for bathing water from the villagers. They obliged but after one bath when she asked them to pour it again, they jokingly stated that "it is better to leave the water, because it is a pity to just pour it after just one wash".

She became the first person to swim across the Bay of Gibraltar (also known as Bay of Algeciras), (Note: Not to be confused with Strait of Gibraltar) a distance of 7 mi (11 km) in 3 hours and 31 minutes, while she crossed the Strait of Gibraltar, a 8.7 mi (14.0 km) stretch, in 7 hours and 13 minutes. Also that month, she crossed the Marmara sea, a distance of 20 mi (32 km) in 8 hours and 13 minutes.

=== English Channel, Strait of Messina and Sea of Galilee swims ===
She attempted to swim across the English Channel, a distance of 20.5 mi (33.0 km) in six unofficial attempts between 1962 and 1968 all of which were unsuccessful. These first three attempts are—one on September 24, 1962, which took 4 hours and 33 minutes, next on October 10, 1962, which took 5 hours and 2 minutes, and a third one on September 15, 1963, which took 3 hours and 30 minutes. In 1964, she made her last three attempts.

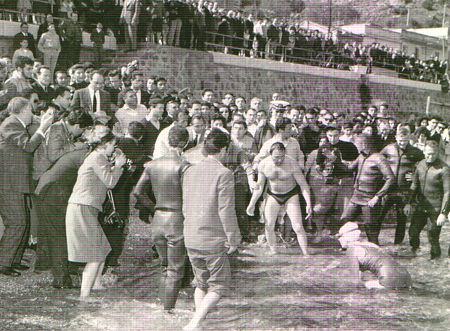
Revell finishing her swim of Strait of Messina, April 1963

Later in April 1963, she became the first woman to round-trip and cross the Strait of Messina, a distance of 13 mi (21 km), in 5 hours and 22 minutes. Just as she reached her final point of this round-trip, she was greeted by a wave of onlookers, who according to Goodwin were "calling out to me to encourage me". It was also broadcast by radio to all of Italy.

In October 1964, she became the first American to cross the Sea of Galilee, a distance of 12.74 mi (20.50 km), in 9 hours and 39 minutes. For this swim, during her training phase, she had crossed the sea widthwise which spanned 8.1 mi (13.0 km). Due to the water of Galilee being very warm, Goodwin recalled she felt nervous and couldn't estimate the time it would take for her to complete the swim. She then expressed a good faith before taking the attempt as she knew the water warmth prevented adverse weather or predators in the sea. This successful crossing made her the third woman to cross Galilee after Malka Tenenbaum and Edna Bornstein.

=== U.S. office and later distance runs of Japan and the Himalayas ===
Goodwin retired from swimming after moving back to the US. In her late 30s, she served under both the Carter and Reagan administrations, as the International Director of Environmental Matters in the Office of the Secretary of the Navy, the term of which lasted for four years from 1979 to 1983. In total, she helped with environmental and ocean policy of the U.S. Navy for a period of 13 years. It was at this time that she found her new passion in long-distance running.

At 45, before making her first big run, Goodwin started looking for sponsorship and in pursuit ran across the U.S. covering a distance of over 200 mi (320 km) from Los Angeles to Lake Meade, Pennsylvania. This run helped her to secure a sponsorship from an automobile CEO, Lee Iacocca. In 1986, three years after leaving the navy, she ran across the entire distance of Japan from north to south, thus becoming the first woman and the first American to do so. Achieving this feat took her 62 days.

In 1988 aged 51, on her second long run, Goodwin crossed the Himalayas mountain range, stretching 3,000 mi (4,800 km). She became the first woman and third person overall to achieve this feat, which took over 5 months that started on March 11, 1988, from Darjeeling and ended on August 28, 1988, in Gulmarg, Kashmir. In this trip, she was accompanied by her German Shorthaired Pointer, Velie, and two assistants who were carrying camping essentials laden on donkeys. The temperatures in the trip ranged from below freezing point to as high as 100 °F (38 °C). The most challenging section of the trip came at Thorong La, a 18,000 ft (5,500 m) mountain pass. At 5 am, she started to cross the pass when the temperature was a below freezing 23 °F (−5 °C), and it took her a 4 hours up climb and 3 hours down climb to traverse it. Also at Thorong La, she described the environment as "The ice had formed and there were high winds. I crawled. I literally -- for patches of the trail -- was sitting and inching my way". Each day she travelled 30 to 40 mi (48 to 64 km) and carried a load that weighed between 15 and 20 lb (6.8 and 9.1 kg). Her diet consisted of rice, mango jelly and peanut butter sandwiches using roti. At the end of the trip, she had a broken foot and had lost over 40 lb (18 kg).

She also made one long-distance run in Great Britain. At the time when she made her long-distance runs, she lived in Ventura, California.

=== Later years ===
Goodwin started as a local historian when she settled in Centreville, Maryland. Old local buildings and architecture in Queen Anne's county in the state drew her attention on its history. She later became the CEO and president of Maryland Museum of Women's History, where she worked to research online exhibits and open its building at Locust Hill, Centreville. In a lecture hosted by Historic Linthicum Walks to celebrate women's history month, Goodwin talked about two American women from Maryland, Anna Ella Carroll, adviser to Abraham Lincoln and Mary Edwardine Bourke Emory, an author.

As a contributor on The Star Democrat, she published op-ed's on the War of 1812 particularly for Queen Anne's county in Maryland. On August 6, 2013, Goodwin presided over the dedication of Queenstown's memorial park to the Battle of Slippery Hill in which 20 state militia from Maryland defeated 300 British soldiers. Following which on January 27, 2016, Goodwin organised the event of re-enacting the minutemen march from Maryland to Northampton County Courthouse to defend against the British soldiers coming from Chesapeake Bay during the American Revolutionary War. In 2022, Goodwin worked on opening an exhibit for women founders of Centreville, Mary and Elizabeth Nicholson.

Goodwin's other works include editing a magazine, working on BBC documentaries, writing a children's book and raising sea otters while living in London. On February 17, 2022, Goodwin was inducted into the Bob Elias Hall of Fame.

== See also ==
- Florence Chadwick – American swimmer (1918–1995)
