= KQKZ =

Radio station in Bakersfield, California

- Bakersfield, California; United States
- Broadcast area: Southwest Kern County
- Frequency: 92.1 MHz (HD Radio)
- Branding: Retro 92.1

Programming
- Languages: Spanish and English
- Format: Bilingual Gold-based Adult Contemporary

Ownership
- Owner: Lotus Communications; (Lotus Bakersfield Corp.)
- Sister stations: KCHJ, KIWI, KPSL-FM, KWAC

History
- First air date: 1987
- Former call signs: KIWI (1985–2003); KPSL-FM (2003–2011); KVMX (2011–2016); KCHJ-FM (2016–2019)
- Call sign meaning: reflection of its previous "Q" branding

Technical information
- Licensing authority: FCC
- Facility ID: 35108
- Class: A
- ERP: 4,200 watts
- HAAT: 121 meters (397 ft)
- Transmitter coordinates: 35°29′11.00″N 118°53′21.00″W

Links
- Public license information: Public file; LMS
- Webcast: Listen live
- Website: retro921.com

KQKZ (92.1 FM) is a commercial radio station licensed to Bakersfield, California, United States. It airs a bilingual gold-based adult contemporary format branded as "Retro 92.1" and is owned by Lotus Communications. Its studios are on Commerce Drive in southwest Bakersfield near the Kern River.

KQKZ's transmitter is sited on Round Mountain Road in Choctaw Valley, northeast of Bakersfield. KQKZ broadcasts in HD Radio.

== History ==
The station received its construction permit in 1985, and signed on as KIWI in 1987. In 1999, Lotus Communications acquired the station. The sale was consummated on August 24 of that year. KIWI was co-owned with KWAC 1490 AM. For much of its early years, it played classical music.

On January 21, 2003, the station changed its call sign to KPSL-FM. Over the years, the station would become a Spanish language station with the Concierto branding.

On September 8, 2011, KPSL-FM swapped call signs and formats with KVMX. With the format swap, it became a classic hits station branded as "The New 92-1 Max-FM".

On May 6, 2013, KVMX flipped to country music, branded as "KiX 92.1". During this time, KVMX carried nationally syndicated programming from Premiere Networks. Mornings featured The Bobby Bones Show from Nashville. Weekends included The Bobby Bones Country Top 30 Countdown on Sunday Morning. American Country Countdown with Kix Brooks was heard on Sunday evenings. The country format lasted for slightly over 3 years.

On July 1, 2016, KVMX broke away from country programming and began simulcasting KCHJ 1010 AM. That included KCHJ's "El Gallito" branding and Classic Ranchera music format. With the simulcast, Lotus changed the call sign to KCHJ-FM.

On July 5, 2019, published reports indicated KCHJ-FM would return to English language programming. In the report, a launch date of July 15 was stated, with the planned change of branding to Q92.1. On July 11, Lotus confirmed the rumors, and formally announced the format change to Rhythmic CHR, with the launch date later being pushed back to July 22, in order to allow more time to construct its social media and web pages.

As part of the upcoming format change, the station's call sign became KQKZ on July 15. KQKZ officially flipped to the new format at 6:00 a.m. on July 22, with its present "Q92.1" branding, patterned after co-owned rhythmic station KSEQ 97.1 in Visalia. KQKZ also used KSEQ's on-air personalities in key dayparts, but included Bakersfield advertisements, news, traffic and weather.

On August 5, 2020, KQKZ suffered an external glitch, that resulted in the station playing classic hits music for nearly two hours. Normal programming was restored at 1:00 p.m. that day. Media watchdogs had suggested possible plans for the station to drop the rhythmic format after 13 months during the affected period. KQKZ had a mere 0.1 share in the June 2020 Nielsen Audio ratings. Shortly after normal programming resumed, the web link on KQKZ's social pages was changed to KSEQ's website.

Nearly a month later, on September 2, the airstaff (voicetracking from KSEQ) said farewell to its Bakersfield listeners via Instagram in advance of the planned changes. At midnight on September 3, after playing "Blinding Lights" by The Weeknd, KQKZ flipped back to classic hits. It kept the "Q92.1" branding (with the glitch turning out to be a brief preview of the forthcoming change). The first song under the classic hits format was "Dance with Me" by Orleans.

The format change marked a return of the format to the San Joaquin valley area, as KQKZ previously broadcast the format as KVMX from 2011 to 2013. On September 8, 2020, KQKZ welcomed new morning host Danny Spank, coming from 106.1 KRAB.

On April 1, 2024, KQKZ changed to a bilingual gold-leaning adult contemporary format. It is branded as "Retro FM 92.1". The change came as "Q92.1" failed to revive the station's ratings, leaving with a mere 0.7, barely an improvement from the previous format, in the February 2024 Nielsen Audio market ratings.

The sound mirrors similar Spanish-English AC stations that have become popular since the launch of WMIA-FM in Miami. WOEX Orlando and WZJZ Fort Myers have switched to the sound in the past year.
