= KCWR =

Radio station in Bakersfield, California

- Bakersfield, California; United States
- Frequency: 107.1 MHz
- Branding: Real Country

Programming
- Format: Classic country
- Affiliations: ABC News Radio

Ownership
- Owner: Buck Owens Production Company; (Owens One Company, Inc)
- Sister stations: KRJK, KUZZ, KUZZ-FM

History
- First air date: March 21, 1990
- Former call signs: KTIE (1989–1997)
- Call sign meaning: Was originally the call letters on 550 AM, now KUZZ.

Technical information
- Licensing authority: FCC
- Facility ID: 43749
- Class: A
- ERP: 6,000 watts
- HAAT: 48 meters (157 ft)
- Transmitter coordinates: 35°22′11″N 119°0′18″W

Links
- Public license information: Public file; LMS

KCWR (107.1 FM) is a commercial radio station licensed to Bakersfield, California broadcasting a classic country format. It is owned by the Buck Owens Production Company. The studios and offices are on Sillect Avenue in Bakersfield.

KCWR's transmitter and tower are off California Avenue near Union Avenue (California State Route 204) in Bakersfield.

== History ==
While it was still a construction permit, the station was given the call sign KTIE on October 18, 1989. It took about six months for the station's studios and transmitter to be built. KTIE signed on the air on March 21, 1990. The owner was Margaret Garza, notable in an era where few women and Hispanics were radio station owners. The studios were at 400 California Avenue, where the station's transmitter and tower continue to operate.

In 1993, it was acquired by the Buck Owens organization. KTIE's format features older country hits while the main FM station, KUZZ-FM 107.9, has a more contemporary playlist.

On January 17, 1997, the station changed its call sign to the current KCWR. Those call letters had been used on 550 AM, also owned by the Buck Owens organization, and now simulcasting 107.9 FM as KUZZ (AM).
