= KCNQ =

- Kernville, California; United States
- Broadcast area: Lake Isabella
- Frequency: 102.5 MHz

Programming
- Format: Country
- Affiliations: ABC News Radio

Ownership
- Owner: Neal and Amie Preston; (Asha Faith James Company)
- Sister stations: KRVQ-FM

Technical information
- Licensing authority: FCC
- Facility ID: 36324
- Class: A
- ERP: 130 watts
- HAAT: 375 meters (1,230 ft)
- Transmitter coordinates: 35°37′21″N 118°26′16″W

Links
- Public license information: Public file; LMS
- Website: kernriverradio.com

KCNQ (102.5 FM) is a commercial radio station broadcasting a country music format. Licensed to Kernville, California, United States, it serves the Lake Isabella area of Central California. The station is owned by Neal and Amie Preston, through licensee Asha Faith James Company.
