= KCHJ (AM) =

Radio station in Delano, California

- Delano, California; United States
- Broadcast area: Bakersfield metropolitan area
- Frequency: 1010 KHz
- Branding: El Gallito

Programming
- Format: Ranchera and norteño oldies

Ownership
- Owner: Lotus Communications; (Lotus Bakersfield Corp.)
- Sister stations: KIWI, KPSL-FM, KQKZ, KWAC

History
- First air date: December 1951
- Call sign meaning: Charles H. Johnes (station founder)

Technical information
- Licensing authority: FCC
- Facility ID: 35111
- Class: B
- Power: 5,000 watts (day); 1,000 watts (night)
- Transmitter coordinates: 35°48′39.8″N 119°19′21.4″W
- Translator: 93.7 K229CD (Bakersfield)

Links
- Public license information: Public file; LMS
- Webcast: Listen live
- Website: elgallito.com

KCHJ (1010 AM "El Gallito 1010") is a commercial radio station licensed to Delano, California, United States, and serving the Bakersfield metropolitan area. Owned by Lotus Communications, it broadcasts a ranchera and norteño oldies format, with studios located in southwest Bakersfield.

KCHJ's transmitter is sited off of Road 112 at Avenue B, northwest of Delano. The station is also relayed over low-power FM translator K229CD at 93.7 MHz.

== History ==
=== Charles H. Johnes ===
The station signed on the air in December 1951. It was owned by Charles H. Johnes (pronounced Jones), hence the KCHJ call letters. He served as the general manager and program director. The studios were on City Line Avenue.

KCHJ was an outlet for country and western music in the 1960s and 1970s. Because it broadcast on a clear channel frequency, KCHJ was a daytimer, required to go off the air at night. It had listeners over a large geographical area in Central California, as Johnes was fond of pointing out on the air. As one of the station's disk jockeys, he used the name Gable Herman.

In the early 1960s the station featured an evening program known as "Freeway 99." (California's Freeway 99 runs right through the City of Delano). The Freeway 99 Show, hosted by Gable, featured music from the easy listening, big band, and jazz genres such as Bert Kaempfert's "Wonderland by Night". Johnes was a pilot as well as a station owner. He died in an auto accident in 1968. From his death until the station was sold in 1991, it was operated and managed by his widow, Jean Johnes. She died in 2009 at the age of 94. Tapes of his programs were broadcast for several years after he died.

Other popular personalities were Bill Lambert, Cousin Rich Allison, Gilbert Oeste, and Todd Welch. Welch was better known as "DJ Sir T" who played disco, funk, soul & R&B. The station would sometimes broadcast in Tagalog and other Filipino languages. The studio was at the transmission site, northwest of Delano. A live program called "The Barn Dance" was broadcast on weekends and the public was invited to visit during the show.

=== Lotus Communications ===
The station was put up for sale in 1999, with Lotus Communications acquiring it. The sale was consummated on August 24. In 2000, KCHJ adopted the "El Gallito" format. It plays classic Ranchera and Norteño hits from the past 40 years.

From 2016 to 2019, this station was simulcast on KCHJ-FM at 92.1 FM. After 92.1 switched to another format as KQKZ, Lotus Communications acquired an FM translator. It rebroadcasts KCHJ programming at 93.7 FM.

== FM translator ==
Broadcast translator for KCHJ
Call sign	Frequency	City of license	FID	ERP (W)	Class	FCC info
K229CD	93.7 FM	Bakersfield, California	139797	250 vertical	D	LMS
