= Americano Media =

American conservative media company

Americano Media was an American media company aimed at the Hispanic community launched in March 2022. It programed radio station WAXY (790 AM) in Miami, known as "Radio Libre", in addition to having an online presence. Its programs were primarily Spanish-language conservative talk shows.

== History ==
Americano Media was founded in March 2022 by Ivan Garcia-Hidalgo, who had been a surrogate for the Donald Trump 2020 presidential campaign after a career in the telecommunications industry. Garcia-Hidalgo founded the company after hearing a longtime complaint among Hispanic Republican leaders, noting, "We don’t have a Fox News in Spanish, and that’s what Americano intends to be." He had previously worked at NTN24 in Colombia, where his program Batalla Política was among its highest-rated shows. Other Republicans in senior roles with Americano include Michael Caputo. Former patent attorney Thomas G. Woolston was the largest investor at launch, loaning $1.2 million to Americano in January 2022, and also served as the chief investment officer.

Audio programming began in March 2022 as a channel on SiriusXM satellite radio; even though there was little target audience on Sirius XM, the move was a publicity gambit designed to attract the attention of radio industry executives and investors. Over the summer, Americano scored several high-profile defections from Radio Mambí, a Cuban-oriented Miami station long known for its conservative stance, after owner TelevisaUnivision finalized a deal to sell the station to Latino Media Network, owned by two women with ties to the Democratic Party. Dania Alexandrino, Lourdes Ubieta, and Nelson Rubio all left for Americano; Ubieta claimed that Univision offered them and other presenters a bonus worth thousands of dollars in exchange for staying and signing a confidentiality agreement, which Pérez Castellón, who stayed, denied. Former congresswoman Mayra Flores was also signed as a contributor. In September, Americano began leasing Miami AM radio station WAXY (790 AM) from Audacy, Inc., rebranding it as "Radio Libre". Several Democratic consultants characterized the move as a recognition that the appetite for Spanish-language conservative radio was limited outside of the Miami area. Three stations in central Florida and a fifth in Bakersfield, California, had also agreed to air Americano programming by April 2023. Americano executives noted that the Bakersfield signal covered the district of Speaker of the House Kevin McCarthy. The Bakersfield station, KNZR AM, began airing Americano programming on June 29, 2023.

Expansion plans in 2023 included an extension of the company's footprint to television as well as the addition of studios in Las Vegas and Washington, D.C. The company stated a goal of airing on 50 stations in key political markets by the end of 2023. Americano's Miami studio was already equipped for television. However, Americano burned through cash. In August, the Miami Herald reported that Americano had not paid its employees since March 2023, and was seeking a new investor or an offer from Voz Media, which had bought TV stations from Spanish Broadcasting System; a senior vice president resigned, blaming Americano's problems on mismanagement, while other employees pointed to its attempts to expand into television production. After the parties failed to reach an agreement, it was announced on August 25 that the company would begin the process of shutting down operations effective immediately.
