= KRVQ-FM =

- Lake Isabella, California; United States
- Frequency: 104.5 MHz

Programming
- Format: Classic rock

Ownership
- Owner: Neal and Amie Preston; (Asha Faith James Company)
- Sister stations: KCNQ

History
- First air date: 1992
- Former call signs: KVLI-FM (1990–2011)

Technical information
- Licensing authority: FCC
- Facility ID: 35856
- Class: A
- ERP: 200 watts
- HAAT: 384 meters (1,260 ft)
- Transmitter coordinates: 35°37′21.00″N 118°26′16.00″W

Links
- Public license information: Public file; LMS

KRVQ-FM (104.5 FM) is a radio station licensed to Lake Isabella, California, United States. The station is owned by Neal and Amie Preston, through licensee Asha Faith James Company, and broadcasts a classic rock format.

== History ==
The station first signed on in 1992 as KVLI-FM, simulcasting the adult standards of its sister station KVLI. In June 1997, Robert J. Bohn and Katherine M. Bohn purchased KVLI-AM-FM for $240,000. The new owners flipped both stations to oldies that September.

On September 23, 2011, the station changed its call sign to KRVQ-FM and switched formats from classic hits to classic rock, branded as "The River".

In August 2014, the Bohns sold KRVQ-FM, KVLI, and KCNQ to Alta Sierra Broadcasting, LLC for $300,000. However, the transaction triggered a complaint to the Federal Communications Commission (FCC) which held up the deal for three years. Calvary Chapel Costa Mesa, licensee of KWVE-FM, alleged that a time brokerage agreement (TBA) between the sellers and Alta Sierra constituted an unauthorized transfer of control because KRVQ-FM and KLVI had no staff on premises. The FCC agreed, levying an $8,000 fine against the Bohns in a consent decree. The penalty was later reduced to $6,000, and the sale closed in July 2017.

On June 23, 2016, KRVQ-FM went silent.

Effective October 4, 2022, Alta Sierra Broadcasting sold KRVQ-FM and KCNQ to Asha Faith James Company for $250,000.
