= KBFP-FM =

- Delano, California; United States
- Broadcast area: Bakersfield metropolitan area
- Frequency: 105.3 MHz
- Branding: Sunny 105.3

Programming
- Format: Adult contemporary
- Affiliations: Premiere Networks

Ownership
- Owner: iHeartMedia, Inc.; (iHM Licenses, LLC)
- Sister stations: KBFP, KDFO, KHTY, KRAB

History
- First air date: 1981
- Former call signs: KZAY (1981–1987); KAMM (1987–1988); KKXX-FM (1988–1998); KKDJ-FM (1998); KSMJ (1998); KKDJ (1998–2006)
- Call sign meaning: "Bakersfield La Preciosa" (previous format)

Technical information
- Licensing authority: FCC
- Facility ID: 37774
- Class: B
- ERP: 35,000 watts
- HAAT: 177 meters (581 ft)
- Transmitter coordinates: 35°30′53″N 119°03′41″W

Links
- Public license information: Public file; LMS
- Webcast: Listen live (via iHeartRadio)
- Website: sunny1053.iheart.com

KBFP-FM (105.3 FM, "Sunny 105.3") is a commercial radio station licensed to Delano, California, United States, and serving the Bakersfield metropolitan area. Owned by iHeartMedia, Inc., it carries an adult contemporary format, with studios on Mohawk Street in southwest Bakersfield and transmitter sited off Porterville Highway (California State Route 65) in Shafter, California. In addition to a standard analog transmission, KBFP-FM is available online via iHeartRadio.

== History ==
105.3 FM signed on in 1981 with the call sign KZAY. On December 11, 1987, KZAY changed to a country music format known as KAMM. KAMM was on the air from December 1987 until March 1988 when KAMM became the new home for KKXX-FM (which had been at 107.9). KKXX-FM was known as top 40 radio station "The New Power 105 KKXX FM", which was at 105.3 FM until July 2, 1998. The call letters KKXX moved to 96.5 FM. KKDJ, an oldies station that was at 98.5 FM at the time moved to 105.3 FM and was known as "Star 105.3". KKDJ changed formats in 2001 to adult contemporary and was known as "K-Lite 105.3".

On September 3, 2004, KKDJ changed formats to a Spanish-language adult contemporary format as La Preciosa 105.3. On January 1, 2006, the call letters KKDJ were changed to KBFP. The KKDJ call letters are now owned by a television station in Arroyo Grande, California.

On August 31, 2018, the station flipped back to an English-language AC format as Sunny 105.3.
