= KGEO =

Coordinates: 35°20′52.9″N 119°00′36.4″W

Currently silent
- Bakersfield, California; United States
- Broadcast area: Central California
- Frequency: 1230 kHz
- Branding: Sports Talk KGEO

Programming
- Format: Sports
- Affiliations: Westwood One Sports

Ownership
- Owner: American General Media; (AGM California)
- Sister stations: KEBT, KERN, KGFM, KISV, KKXX-FM

History
- First air date: 1946
- Former call signs: KERO (1945–1955); KGEE (1955–1980); KGAM (1980–1981)

Technical information
- Licensing authority: FCC
- Facility ID: 36233
- Class: C
- Power: 1,000 watts (unlimited)
- Translators: 101.1 K266CG (Bakersfield, relays KISV-HD2)
- Repeater: 94.1 KISV-HD2 (Bakersfield)

Links
- Public license information: Public file; LMS
- Webcast: Listen Live
- Website: kgeo.com

KGEO (1230 AM, "Sports Talk KGEO") is a commercial radio station licensed to Bakersfield, California, United States. It broadcasts a sports format with shows from Westwood One Sports. KGEO is the flagship of locally-based American General Media, with studios located at the Easton Business Complex in southwest Bakersfield.

KGEO's transmitter is located southwest of Highway 58 and Union Avenue in southeast Bakersfield. The station is also relayed over low-power FM translator K266CG at 101.1 MHz.

== History ==
The station signed on the air in 1946. Its original call sign was KERO. Its studios were in the El Tejon Hotel in Downtown Bakersfield, and was an NBC Radio Network affiliate. In 1953, KERO added Bakersfield's second television station to its broadcast properties. That station still bears the KERO-TV call letters.

Original local owner Kern County Broadcasters sold off the radio station in 1955, and the call letters were changed to KGEE. It aired a mix of talk and middle of the road (MOR) music. Its moniker was "KGEE, The Talk of the Town".

The station was assigned the call letters KGEO by the Federal Communications Commission on May 18, 1981. With the new call sign, 1230 AM became one of Bakersfield's first stations to program an oldies format, playing the hits from 1954 to early 1970s. The station was known as "KGEOldies". During the 1980s, it advertised itself as playing four decades of hits.

KGEO switched to an all talk format in the late 1990s. It featured syndicated shows from Dennis Miller, Dave Ramsey, Lou Dobbs, Clark Howard, Wall Street Journal Radio, America's Morning News and Red Eye Radio. Local programing heard on KGEO included Your Radio Store and Californian Radio with hosts Jeff Lemuccci, Richard Beene, Lois Henry, Robert Price and John Arthur. KGEO also carried minor league baseball games of the now-defunct Bakersfield Blaze in the California League.

KGEO later experimented with hot talk carrying such syndicated programs as "The Phil Hendrie Show" and "The Tom Leykis Show". Imus in the Morning was heard on KGEO until its cancellation in April 2007. KGEO also dropped "The Don and Mike Show" just one week before radio veteran Don Geronimo had planned to retire anyway.

In the early 2000s, KGEO switched to an all-sports format, airing an extensive lineup from ESPN Radio. It left sports radio for a few years but on Monday, March 31, 2008, sports returned to 1230 AM. KGEO once again affiliated with ESPN Radio and was rebranded as ESPN Radio 1230.

On April 5, 2011, KGEO changed formats and became a news/talk station known as "$mart Talk 1230." That lasted a short time and once again, KGEO returned to ESPN Radio as its Bakersfield affiliate.

In January 2026, KGEO dropped the ESPN Radio affiliate and rebranded as "Sports Talk KGEO" with Westwood One Sports programming.

On April 9, 2026, The KGEO call letters moved from 1230 AM to 1180 AM, swapping frequencies with KERN and its talk format.

== Previous logos ==
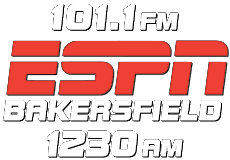
