= KDFO =

Radio station in Delano, California

- Delano, California; United States
- Broadcast area: Bakersfield metropolitan area
- Frequency: 98.5 MHz
- Branding: 98.5 The Fox

Programming
- Format: Classic rock
- Affiliations: Premiere Networks

Ownership
- Owner: iHeartMedia, Inc.; (iHM Licenses, LLC)
- Sister stations: KBFP, KBFP-FM, KHTY, KRAB

History
- First air date: November 1968
- Former call signs: KDNO (1968–1997, 2000–2001); KKDJ (1997–1998); KKDJ-FM (7/1/1998); KSMJ (1998–2000); KDFO-FM (2001–2008); KBKO-FM (2008)
- Call sign meaning: Delano Fox

Technical information
- Licensing authority: FCC
- Facility ID: 64607
- Class: B1
- ERP: 8,000 watts
- HAAT: 177 meters (581 ft)
- Transmitter coordinates: 35°30′53″N 119°3′41″W

Links
- Public license information: Public file; LMS
- Webcast: Listen live (via iHeartRadio)
- Website: 985thefox.iheart.com

KDFO (98.5 FM, "98-5 The Fox") is a commercial radio station licensed to Delano, California, United States, and serving the Bakersfield metropolitan area. Owned by iHeartMedia, it broadcasting a classic rock format, with studios on Mohawk Street near the Kern River.

KDFO's transmitter is sited off Porterville Highway (California State Highway 65) in Shafter.

== History ==
The station signed on the air in November 1968. Its original call sign was KDNO. It was a Christian radio station with studios and transmitter in Delano.

It was later owned by Richard Palmquist, who purchased the station from Chester Newell in 1970. Adopting the slogan Uplift 98.5, the station was on the air until Palmquist sold it in 1997 to Mondosphere Corporation and went into retirement. Today, the KDNO call letters belong to a station in Wyoming. At that point, KDNO was owned by a California Corporation, Tape Networks Inc., founded by Palmquist when he was a broadcast consultant in the Los Angeles area. After building KDNO for a client, that owner's bank loan was withdrawn. Palmquist arranged for his friend Chester Newell to purchase the station, and Palmquist became the manager. Later, Newell sold the station to Tape Networks, Inc.

Palmquist raised the purchase price by soliciting donations from KDNO listeners. The station, however, was devoted to ministry rather than revenue, so to supplement his income Palmquist purchased the Pixley Enterprise Newspaper and later the Terra Bella News. He merged them to form the "Enterprise News," and the newspaper became commercially successful, thus helping to support the radio ministry. After two unsuccessful efforts to sell the newspaper, Palmquist closed that business in 1993 to concentrate on improving the radio station's music and Bible teaching ministry. However, income from listener support, though supporting current expenses, could not pay off the half million dollar long term debt on the station. When Palmquist reached retirement age, he sold the station to honor his obligation to those who had helped purchase and build the station. After the sale of KDNO, Palmquist transferred much of the KDNO programming to an online format: www.truthradio.com and www.truthradio.info.

logo use 1998-2000

After Mondosphere took over, the station was downgraded from a class B at 50,000 watts to its current 8,000 watt power. The transmitter was moved to the same tower now used by 105.3 KBFP-FM, a site closer to Bakersfield. It was known as Star 98.5 KKDJ and was an oldies and classic hits station. Its playlist was made up of hits from the late 1960s, 70s and early 80s.

In 1998, a frequency switch was arranged. KKDJ moved to 105.3 FM and KSMJ moved to 98.5 FM. The station then was known as Smooth Jazz 98.5 KSMJ. It played a smooth jazz format of mostly instrumental jazz hits with some R&B and soft rock vocals.

On March 24, 2000, the smooth jazz format was flipped to a classic rock. The call letters were later changed to KDFO and the station branded as "98.5 The Fox". (Using a Fox mascot is popular on a number of classic rock stations around the U.S.) Later in 2000, the station was acquired by San Antonio-based Clear Channel Communications. (In 2014, Clear Channel changed its name to iHeartMedia, the current owner.)

Logo under previous slogan

On February 15, 2008, the call letters KBKO and the country music format were briefly moved from 96.5 FM to 98.5 FM in a frequency swap with KDFO where it was branded as "98.5 KBKO". The flip only lasted four months. On June 20, 2008, the two stations were moved back to their previous frequencies.
