= KHTY =

- Bakersfield, California; United States
- Broadcast area: Kern County, California
- Frequency: 970 kHz
- Branding: Fox Sports 800 and 970

Programming
- Format: Sports
- Affiliations: Fox Sports Radio

Ownership
- Owner: iHeartMedia, Inc.; (iHM Licenses, LLC)
- Sister stations: KBFP, KBFP-FM, KDFO, KRAB

History
- First air date: 1958
- Former call signs: KBIS (1958–1977); KUZZ (1977–1986); KAFY (1986–2000); KZPM (2000–2001); KZTK (2001–2002); KGET (2002–2006)

Technical information
- Licensing authority: FCC
- Facility ID: 40868
- Class: B
- Power: 1,000 watts (day); 5,000 watts (night)
- Transmitter coordinates: 35°26′59.8″N 118°56′51.4″W
- Repeater: 800 KBFP (Bakersfield)

Links
- Public license information: Public file; LMS
- Webcast: Listen live (via iHeartRadio)
- Website: foxsports970am.iheart.com

KHTY (970 AM) is a commercial radio station licensed to Bakersfield, California, United States, and serving inland Central California. Owned by iHeartMedia, KHTY features a sports radio format as a Fox Sports Radio affiliate, simulcast with KBFP. KHTY and KBFP both air play-by-play from the Los Angeles Lakers, the Los Angeles Dodgers, the Fresno State Bulldogs and the Bakersfield Condors, and are affiliated with the Motor Racing Network and Performance Racing Network.

== History ==
This station first signed on the air in 1958 as KBIS. It was a daytimer, operating at a power of 1,000 watts and required to go off the air at sunset.

In June 1976, Westco Media sold KBIS to Thunderbird Broadcasting, owned by popular country music singer Buck Owens, for $382,500. Owens lived in Bakersfield. As Thunderbird already owned KUZZ (then at 800 AM) in Bakersfield, and Federal Communications Commission (FCC) regulations at the time prohibited ownership of multiple AM stations within the same market, that company sold KUZZ to the International Church of the Foursquare Gospel for $100,000. The FCC approved both license transfers on November 16, and KBIS adopted the KUZZ call letters the following January.

In August 1984, Buck Owens Broadcasting orchestrated a frequency swap with Sunset Broadcasting Corp., owner of KAFY. Owens traded KUZZ, a daytimer on 970 AM, to Sunset for KAFY — located on the stronger, full-time 550 AM frequency — plus $650,000 in cash. The 970 AM frequency took on the KAFY call letters in January 1986. In April 1987, Sunset Broadcasting, headed by Daren McGavren, sold KAFY to McGavren-Barro Broadcasting Corp. — owned by his son Steve McGavren and Mary Helen Barro — for $700,000. At the time of the sale, KAFY was broadcasting in the Spanish language.

In April 2000, Hispanic Media Group, headed by Amancio Suarez Sr., sold KAFY and a construction permit for a second AM station in Bakersfield to Golden Pegasus Financial Services for $825,000. At the time, KAFY broadcast a regional Mexican music format. The station would change hands once again by the end of the year as Clear Channel Communications purchased the newly rechristened KZPM for $1.4 million.

Throughout the 2000s under Clear Channel ownership, the 970 AM frequency took on various call signs and formats. In May 2001, Clear Channel began using the KZTK call sign on the then-news/talk outlet. In September 2002, the call letters changed to KGET to match those of television station KGET-TV, at the time also owned by Clear Channel. The radio station KGET was branded "News Talk 970 KGET".

In January 2006, the KGET call letters were changed to KHTY. The station at the time was a classic hits radio station branded as "Mighty 970". In 2007, KHTY switched back to news/talk with the branding "Business 970 KHTY". Later that year, KHTY began airing a news/talk format in Spanish.

Former KHTY/Fox Sports 970 logo

On March 2, 2009, KHTY flipped to sports radio with the branding "Fox Sports 970". On June 13, 2022, KHTY began simulcasting on KBFP 800 AM Bakersfield, replacing that station's comedy format.

Logo before KBFP simulcast

== Programming ==
The station lineup includes The Dan Patrick Show, The Herd with Colin Cowherd, The Doug Gottlieb Show, The Jason Smith Show and The Ben Maller Show.

Also on KHTY and KBFP are broadcasts of the Bakersfield Condors, the Fresno State Bulldogs, the Los Angeles Lakers and the Los Angeles Dodgers. Car racing is covered by the Motor Racing Network and the Performance Racing Network.
