= KGFM =

Bakersfield, California; United States
- Broadcast area: Bakersfield metropolitan area
- Frequency: 101.5 MHz
- Branding: 101.5 Big FM

Programming
- Format: Adult hits

Ownership
- Owner: American General Media; (AGM California, Inc.)
- Sister stations: KEBT, KERN, KGEO, KISV, KKXX-FM

History
- First air date: October 1, 1964

Technical information
- Licensing authority: FCC
- Facility ID: 36234
- Class: B
- ERP: 6,700 watts
- HAAT: 396 meters (1,299 ft)
- Transmitter coordinates: 35°26′17″N 118°44′22″W

Links
- Public license information: Public file; LMS
- Webcast: Listen live
- Website: 1015bigfm.com

KGFM (101.5 FM, "101.5 Big FM") is a commercial radio station licensed to Bakersfield, California, United States. The station is owned by American General Media and the license is held by AGM California. KGFM airs an adult hits format.

The studios and offices are on Easton Drive in Bakersfield. The transmitter is off Breckenridge Road.

== History ==
=== Beautiful music and Soft AC ===
On October 1, 1964, KGFM first signed on the air as the sister station of KGEE (now KGEO). Originally, KGFM was largely an automated beautiful music station playing lush instrumental cover versions of popular songs, as well as Broadway and Hollywood show tunes. This continued through the 1960s and 70s. By the 1980s, KGFM was adding more vocals and had moved to an easy listening sound. By 1992, KGFM completed the transition to soft adult contemporary.

KGFM stayed with soft AC until 2005, when the decision was made to emphasize gold product along with adult contemporary music. During the weekends, it played songs from the 1960s and 1970s, which targeted the Baby Boomer demographic.

=== Hot AC and Adult Hits ===
In 2013, KGFM picked up the tempo and began its transition toward a hot AC format, dropping all songs from before 1980. KGFM rebranded as "101.5 Today's Best Mix". By 2015, KGFM was only playing songs recorded after 2000.

On April 1, 2021, KGFM changed its format from hot adult contemporary to adult hits. It rebranded as "101.5 Big FM".
