= KEBT =

Radio station in Lost Hills–Bakersfield, California

- Lost Hills, California; United States
- Broadcast area: Bakersfield, California
- Frequency: 96.9 MHz
- Branding: La Caliente 96.9

Programming
- Format: Regional Mexican

Ownership
- Owner: American General Media
- Sister stations: KERN, KGEO, KGFM, KISV, KKXX-FM

History
- First air date: 1990
- Former call signs: KWQH (1990–2001); KLRM (2001–2006)
- Call sign meaning: "Beat" (previous branding)

Technical information
- Licensing authority: FCC
- Facility ID: 11622
- Class: B1
- ERP: 15,500 watts
- HAAT: 126 meters (413 ft)
- Transmitter coordinates: 35°19′40″N 119°42′58″W

Links
- Public license information: Public file; LMS
- Webcast: Listen live
- Website: 969lacaliente.com

KEBT (96.9 FM, "La Caliente 96.9") is a radio station licensed to Lost Hills, California, United States. The station is owned by American General Media of California. The station airs a Regional Mexican music format. Its studios are located at the Easton Business Complex in southwest Bakersfield, and its transmitter is located west of McKittrick, California.

== History ==
The station was assigned the KEBT call letters by the Federal Communications Commission on May 22, 2006. On May 30, 2006, KEBT began its broadcast in Bakersfield with a Rhythmic/Old School format. The station was known as 96.9 The Beat.

On September 27, 2007, the station changed programming formats and is now a Regional Mexican station known as La Caliente 96.9.

== Programming ==
Programming on this station includes El Piolin on mornings, Eriko al Mediodia and El Show Del Cascabel on afternoons.
