= KERI =

- Bakersfield, California; United States
- Broadcast area: Kern County, California
- Frequency: 1410 kHz
- Branding: Faith & Family 1410 AM

Programming
- Format: Brokered Christian

Ownership
- Owner: Robert and Luann Wilkins; (Bob Wilkins Radio Network Broadcasting, Inc.)

History
- First air date: May 17, 1950
- Former call signs: KWSO (1950–2003)
- Call sign meaning: "Kern County inspirational programming"

Technical information
- Licensing authority: FCC
- Facility ID: 6640
- Class: B
- Power: 1,000 watts
- Transmitter coordinates: 35°21′6.9″N 118°57′32.4″W

Links
- Public license information: Public file; LMS
- Webcast: Listen live
- Website: wilkinsradio.com/our-stations/keri-1410am-bakersfield-ca

KERI (1410 AM, "Faith & Family 1410 AM") is a commercial radio station licensed to Bakersfield, California, United States. Owned by Robert and Luann Wilkins, through licensee Bob Wilkins Radio Network Broadcasting, Inc., it airs a Christian format.

KERI's studios and offices are on Easton Drive in Bakersfield and the transmitter is located on Kimber Avenue in Bakersfield, off Route 58 - Exit 115.

== History ==
On May 17, 1950, the station first sign-on signed on as KWSO, a 250-watt daytimer station at 1050 kHz, owned by Maple Leaf Broadcasting. It was licensed to Wasco, California, about 25 miles northwest of Bakersfield. Because 1050 AM is a Mexican clear channel frequency, KWSO was required to go off the air at night to avoid interference. By the 1960s, the station had assorted programs including middle of the road and classical music, farm and news reports and religious programs. The station's signal was limited to the area around Wasco, and was reflected in the KWSO call letters.

In the early 1980s, the Federal Communications Commission allowed KWSO to move to 1180 kHz, coupled with a boost in power to 10,000 watts by day and nighttime authorization, running with 1,000 watts after sunset, using a directional antenna. With this new power, the station could be heard around the larger Bakersfield radio market. It switched to a full-time religious format, changing its call sign to KERI, which stands for "Kern County inspirational programming". (The 1050 frequency is now occupied by KJPG in nearby Frazier Park, California, airing a Catholic radio format.)

In the early 2000s, the station got another power boost, this time powered at its current 50,000 watts by day and 10,000 watts at night. Its city of license was changed to two communities, Wasco and Greenacres. In 2004, the station was bought by American General Media, which owns five other stations in the Bakersfield market.

On January 1, 2009, a frequency swap with talk radio sister station KERN 1410 AM was made. The talk format on KERN was moved to the more powerful 1180 frequency, while the religious format on KERI switched to AM 1410. (For the history of the 1410 frequency, see KERN.) After the switch was made, KERI 1410 was sold to the Watkins Radio Network, which owns about 30 other religious stations around the U.S.

== Previous logo ==
KERI logo while broadcast on 1180 AM
