= KERN =

- Wasco-Greenacres, California; United States
- Broadcast area: Bakersfield metropolitan area
- Frequency: 1180 kHz
- Branding: KERN News Talk 96.1 and AM 1180

Programming
- Format: Talk radio
- Affiliations: Genesis Communications Network; Premiere Networks; Salem Radio Network; Townhall; Westwood One

Ownership
- Owner: American General Media; (AGM California)
- Sister stations: KEBT, KGEO, KGFM, KISV, KKXX-FM

History
- First air date: January 29, 1932
- Former call signs: KERI (1984–2008); KWSO (1950–1984)
- Call sign meaning: Kern County, California

Technical information
- Licensing authority: FCC
- Facility ID: 35899
- Class: B
- Power: 10,000 watts
- Transmitter coordinates: 35°34′16.8″N 119°19′29.4″W
- Translator: 96.1 K241CI (Bakersfield)

Links
- Public license information: Public file; LMS
- Webcast: Listen live
- Website: www.kernradio.com

KERN (1180 AM) is a commercial radio station licensed to Wasco-Greenacres, California, and serving the Bakersfield metropolitan area. It airs a talk radio radio format and is owned by American General Media. The station's studios and offices are in the American General Media complex on Easton Drive in Bakersfield.

Weekdays begin with a local news and interview show, "First Look with Scott Cox". Ralph Bailey hosts another local show in afternoon drive time. The rest of the weekday schedule comes from nationally syndicated conservative talk programs: Armstrong & Getty, The Charlie Kirk Show, The Clay Travis and Buck Sexton Show, Ag Today and Red Eye Radio. Weekends feature shows on health, money, real estate, home repair, law and computers. Weekend syndicated shows include Kim Komando, Bill Cunningham and Bruce DuMont. Some weekend hours are paid brokered programming. Most hours begin with an update from Townhall Radio News with local news from the KERN newsroom.

KERN is the flagship station of the Bakersfield College Renegades sports teams and Cal State Bakersfield Men's Basketball.

== Transmitter and FM translator ==
KERN operates with 10,000 watts. It uses a directional antenna to avoid interference with clear-channel WHAM in Rochester, New York. KERN's transmitter is off Jackson Avenue in Wasco. Programming is simulcast on a translator at 96.1 MHz.

Broadcast translator for KERN
Call sign	Frequency	City of license	FID	ERP (W)	Class	FCC info
K241CI	96.1 FM	Bakersfield, California	139845	250	D	LMS

== History ==
=== Early years ===
KERN signed on the air on January 29, 1932. It originally broadcast on 1370 kilocycles, powered at 100 watts. In its early days it was owned by the Bee Bakersfield Broadcasting Company, a subsidiary of The McClatchy Company, owner of a number of radio stations and newspapers in California. KERN served as the CBS Radio Network affiliate for Bakersfield, carrying its schedule of dramas, comedies, news, sports, soap operas, game shows and big band broadcasts during the "Golden Age of Radio."

KERN moved to 1410 kHz in 1941 as the result of NARBA (North American Regional Broadcasting Agreement), increasing power to 1,000 watts. In 1948, it added an FM station at 94.1, KERN-FM (now KISV). At first, KERN-FM simulcast most of the programming of the AM station. As network programming moved to TV in the 1950s, KERN switched to middle of the road (MOR) music programming with local air personalities and news.

=== Top 40 and MOR ===
In the 1960s, KERN flipped to a Top 40 sound. Johnny Mitchell, Program Director and Phil Drake, Music Director took this fledgling station to a solid number one in 1973, soundly beating its competitor, KAFY 550 AM (now KUZZ). On September 1962, McClatchy sold KERN-AM-FM to Radio, KERN Inc., owned by Roger H. Stoner, for $145,000. It originally broadcast on 1370 kilocycles, powered at 100 watts. KERN was among the first stations to carry the nationally syndicated countdown show American Top 40 hosted by Casey Kasem, beginning on July 4, 1970. Also in 1970, KERN sold its FM station to The Reliable Broadcast Company, which had just bought 1350 KLYD (now KLHC). Emmy Award winning writer Ken Levine (then known as Ken Stevens) got his start in radio at KERN in 1971.

As Top 40 listening switched to FM in the late 1970s, KERN moved to a middle of the road (MOR) format, with national news supplied by the ABC Information Network.

=== Talk radio ===
In the 1980s, many radio listeners were switching to FM radio to hear music. As an AM station, KERN began adding some talk shows to its schedule to move away from music. By the mid-1990s, KERN had made the switch to all talk, using programming from the ABC Talk Radio Network and NBC's Talknet.

On December 29, 2008, KERN started simulcasting on 1180 AM to get listeners used to the new frequency as part of a frequency swap with sister station KERI, which ran a religious format. (For the history of the 1180 station before 2008, see "KERI.") The KERN call sign was officially moved from 1410 to 1180 on December 30, 2008, and the KERI call sign was moved to 1410. On January 1, 2009, the Christian music format was reunited with the KERI call sign on 1410 AM.

=== Frequency Swap ===
On April 9, 2026, the KERN call letters and talk format moved from 1180 AM to 1230 AM, while the KGEO calls moved from 1230 AM to 1180 AM, which went silent. The 96.1 FM translator is still simulcasting KERN's talk format.

== Previous logo ==
KERN logo while broadcast on 1410 AM

KERN logo on 1180 AM December 30, 2008
