= KNZR (AM) =

Radio station in Bakersfield, California

Coordinates: 35°18′29.9″N 119°2′49.4″W

Simulcasts KNZR-FM Shafter
- Bakersfield, California; United States
- Broadcast area: Kern County
- Frequency: 1560 kHz
- Branding: KNZR AM1560 & FM97.7

Programming
- Format: Conservative talk radio
- Network: Fox News Radio
- Affiliations: Premiere Networks; Salem Radio Network; Westwood One

Ownership
- Owner: Frequency Media; (Frequency Broadcasting Inc.)
- Sister stations: KKBB; KLLY; KNZR-FM

History
- First air date: 1935; 91 years ago
- Former call signs: W6XAI (1934–1936); KPMC (1936–1990)

Technical information
- Licensing authority: FCC
- Facility ID: 7715
- Class: A
- Power: 25,000 watts day; 10,000 watts night

Links
- Public license information: Public file; LMS
- Webcast: Listen live
- Website: www.knzr.com

KNZR (1560 kHz) is a commercial AM radio station in Bakersfield, California. Along with sister station 97.7 KNZR-FM, they simulcast a conservative talk radio format and are owned by Frequency Media. The studios and offices are on Pegasus Drive in Bakersfield.

KNZR broadcasts with 25,000 watts of power by day and 10,000 watts at night from its transmitter on Artimus Court in Bakersfield. It uses a directional antenna with a three-tower array after sunset. KNZR is designated by the Federal Communications Commission (FCC) as a clear channel radio station, sharing Class A status on 1560 AM with WFME in New York City.

== Programming ==
KNZR-AM-FM's weekday schedule features one local talk show heard in late mornings, hosted by Terry Maxwell, a former Bakersfield City Council member and restaurateur. The rest of the weekday schedule is nationally syndicated conservative talk shows: The Glenn Beck Radio Program, The Sean Hannity Show, The Larry Elder Show, The Mark Levin Show, The O'Reilly Update with Bill O'Reilly, The Ramsey Show with Dave Ramsey and Coast to Coast AM with George Noory.

On weekends, syndicated shows include At Home with Gary Sullivan, Bill Handel on the Law, Tom Gresham's Gun Talk, The Mike Gallagher Show, Somewhere in Time with Art Bell and Rich DeMuro on Tech. Most hours begin with an update from Fox News Radio.

== History ==
=== W6XAI ===
On December 19, 1933, the Federal Radio Commission (FRC) authorized three new frequencies, between 1500 and 1600 kHz, for high-fidelity operation. (At the time, the AM broadcast band ended at 1500 kHz.) These new 20 kHz-wide channels were twice as wide as the standard AM broadcasting channels. Six applications were submitted to the FRC, including one for 1550 kHz in Bakersfield from the Pioneer Mercantile Company.

The Pioneer application was one of the four approved in April, and the station went on the air under the experimental call sign W6XAI. Although licensed as an experimental station, it was authorized to conduct commercial operations. The initial authoruzation was for a power of 1,000 watts, and this was the second station on the air in Bakersfield, after KERN.

=== KPMC ===
In 1934, the Federal Radio Commission was replaced by the Federal Communications Commission (FCC). In November 1936, the FCC allowed the high-fidelity stations to adopt conventional call letters, and the call sign was changed to KPMC, named after the Pioneer Mercantile Company. When the North American Regional Broadcasting Agreement came into effect on March 29, 1941, the high-fidelity stations were converted to standard AM stations and relocated, with KPMC reassigned to 1560 kHz.

KPMC was an ABC Radio Network affiliate in the 1940s and early 1950s, carrying its schedule of dramas, comedies, news and sports. In the 1950s, KPMC was given Class I-B status by the FCC, allowing it to increase its power to 10,000 watts. As network programming moved from radio to television in the 1950s, KPMC switched to a full service middle of the road format of popular music, news, talk and sports.

=== KNZR ===
In the 1980s, KPMC eliminated its music programming and went full-time as a talk radio station. It was an affiliate of both CBS Radio and the Mutual Broadcasting System, used for their newsgathering of U.S. and world stories.

In January 1990, Buckley Broadcasting bought KPMC for $1 million. Buckley switched the call sign to KNZR on September 21, 1990.

==== Changes in ownership ====
Buckley Broadcasting acquired smooth jazz station 97.7 KSMJ in 2001. In November 2011, Buckley decided to pair 97.7 FM with AM 1560, to give Bakersfield listeners the choice to hear the talk programming on KNZR on either AM or FM. KSMJ changed to its current KNZR-FM call sign on September 11, 2013.

Logo before 97.7 simulcast

In 2014, Buckley Broadcasting sold its California stations, including KNZR-AM-FM, to Alpha Media of Portland, Oregon. Alpha Media chairman Larry Wilson said, "The Buckley clusters in California will be a great addition to the West Coast footprint. Bakersfield is a rich and vibrant city full of live and local opportunities."

==== Racial controversy ====
On January 18, 2018, Midday host Jaz McKay was told that due to budgetary concerns he would be replaced the next week with Sean Hannity in the noon to 3p.m. slot which he had occupied for 14 years. McKay then took to social media and used derogatory language to describe Hispanic radio broadcasts in the area. McKay claimed the large number of Spanish language radio stations in Bakersfield made it increasingly difficult for English speaking announcers to find employment. At 45.5%, Hispanics comprise the largest demographic group in Bakersfield. On January 24, McKay's time slot was indeed taken over by the syndicated radio show from Sean Hannity. On the same day, it was also reported that McKay's fellow conservative talk show host Inga Barks was, for unspecified reasons, no longer associated with the station. McKay was later hired for the midday time slot on KERN in December 2018.

==== Spanish-language era ====
KNZR (AM) switched to a Spanish-language conservative talk format on June 29, 2023. Much of its programming came from Americano Media in Miami, Florida, which airs the format on WAXY. The Spanish-language format was short-lived. It returned to English on September 12, 2023.

Alpha Media merged with Connoisseur Media on September 4, 2025.

On October 14, 2025, Connoisseur Media Announced the Bakersfield cluster had been sold to Danny and Kait Hill’s Frequency Media.
