= KLLY =

Radio station in Oildale, California

- Oildale, California; United States
- Broadcast area: Bakersfield, California
- Frequency: 95.3 MHz
- Branding: Kelly 95.3

Programming
- Format: Contemporary hit radio
- Affiliations: Premiere Networks

Ownership
- Owner: Frequency Media; (Frequency Broadcasting Inc.)
- Sister stations: KKBB; KNZR; KNZR-FM

History
- First air date: 1984
- Call sign meaning: "Kelly" (current branding)

Technical information
- Licensing authority: FCC
- Facility ID: 7709
- Class: B1
- ERP: 12,500 watts
- HAAT: 141 meters (463 ft)
- Transmitter coordinates: 35°27′32.8″N 119°1′16.3″W

Links
- Public license information: Public file; LMS
- Webcast: Listen live
- Website: klly953.com

KLLY (95.3 FM, "Kelly 95.3") is a commercial radio station licensed to the community of Oildale, California, and serving the Bakersfield, California, area. The station is owned by Frequency Broadcasting. KLLY's studios and transmitter are separately located in Oildale.

== History ==
The station was assigned the KLLY call letters by the Federal Communications Commission on February 23, 1984. It was known throughout much of the 1980s and 1990s as Bakersfield's soft rock leader. The station flipped to a hot adult contemporary format in 1997. In 2012 the station flipped to Top 40. The station has kept the same KLLY call letters throughout its history, at one point branding as "KELLY 95.3".

On October 10, 2014, Buckley California (the California operations of Buckley Radio), announced their intent to sell KLLY, along with their remaining stations, to Alpha Media, marking Buckley's exit from radio and Alpha's entry into California. The sale was consummated on January 1, 2015.

On June 19, 2015, KLLY rebranded as "Energy 95.3". No other changes came with the rebranding, except for a musical shift from mainstream to rhythmic, which resulted in Mediabase moving KLLY to the Rhythmic panel in July 2015. Shortly after the panel change, KLLY started to revert toward a Top 40 playlist which resulted in Mediabase moving KLLY back to the Top 40 panel in November 2015

On December 11, 2024, KLLY rebranded as "Live 95.3" with no change in format, modeled after Portland sister station KBFF. Alpha Media merged with Connoisseur Media on September 4, 2025.

On October 14, 2025, Connoisseur Media Announced the Bakersfield cluster had been sold to Danny and Kait Hill's Frequency Media.

On April 13, 2026, KLLY returned to its heritage branding of "Kelly 95.3" under ownership on local owners Frequency Broadcasting. The new line-up includes local hosts Danny & Kait in the morning to go against non-local syndicated hosts as well as local host Erik Fox who was a part of Kelly 95.3 for 18 years.
