= KRAB =

- Greenacres, California; United States
- Broadcast area: Bakersfield metropolitan area
- Frequency: 106.1 MHz
- Branding: ALT 106.1: KRAB Radio

Programming
- Format: Alternative rock
- Affiliations: Compass Media Networks; Premiere Networks

Ownership
- Owner: iHeartMedia, Inc.; (iHM Licenses, LLC)
- Sister stations: KBFP, KBFP-FM, KDFO, KHTY

History
- First air date: March 29, 1991
- Call sign meaning: A play on "Crab"

Technical information
- Licensing authority: FCC
- Facility ID: 17359
- Class: B1
- ERP: 25,000 watts
- HAAT: 100 meters (330 ft)
- Transmitter coordinates: 35°21′33.00″N 118°43′45.00″W

Links
- Public license information: Public file; LMS
- Webcast: Listen live (via iHeartRadio)
- Website: krab.iheart.com

KRAB (106.1 FM, "Alt 106.1") is a commercial radio station licensed to Greenacres, California, United States, and serving the Bakersfield metropolitan area. The station airs an alternative rock format and is owned by iHeartMedia, Inc. KRAB's studios are on Mohawk Street in southwest Bakersfield.

KRAB's transmitter is off Bena Road east of Bakersfield in rural Kern County.

== History ==
This station's history began on June 26, 1987, when a construction permit was issued by the Federal Communications Commission. It called for a new radio station at 106.3 FM. On July 8 of that year, the KRAB call letters were assigned to the construction permit. The station was founded by Atmosphere Broadcasting LP, which applied for its license in late 1990.

KRAB finally signed on the air on March 29, 1991. Because 106.3 FM had been a frequency only for Class A stations, KRAB was limited in power. Several years later the station changed frequencies and began broadcasting at 106.1. That permitted it to boost its power.

In October 2000, Clear Channel Communications (now iHeartMedia) acquired the station. This station was placed into the Aloha Station Trust in 2008, with the intention to sell it. But that decision was later changed and iHeartMedia substantially reacquired the station in 2014.
