= KKBB =

Radio station in Bakersfield, California

- Bakersfield, California; United States
- Frequency: 99.3 MHz
- Branding: Groove 99.3

Programming
- Format: Rhythmic oldies
- Affiliations: Compass Media Networks

Ownership
- Owner: Frequency Media; (Frequency Broadcasting Inc.)
- Sister stations: KLLY; KNZR; KNZR-FM

History
- First air date: November 3, 1990
- Former call signs: KCHT (1990–1994); KOQQ (1994)

Technical information
- Licensing authority: FCC
- Facility ID: 7720
- Class: B1
- ERP: 10,000 watts
- HAAT: 119 meters (390 ft)
- Transmitter coordinates: 35°27′32.8″N 119°1′16.4″W

Links
- Public license information: Public file; LMS
- Webcast: Listen live
- Website: groove993.com

KKBB (99.3 FM, "Groove 99.3") is a commercial radio station located in Bakersfield, California. The station is owned by Frequency Media. KKBB airs a rhythmic oldies music format. The station was assigned the KKBB call letters by the Federal Communications Commission on December 9, 1994. KKBB's studios and transmitter are separately located in Oildale.

== History ==
KKBB was originally known by the call letters of KCHT airing a Top 40 music format branded as "The Heat". The radio station was built and owned by Elgee Broadcasting Corporation. It signed on the air for the first time at 6 p.m. on November 3, 1990. The music programming was syndicated by ABC Radio Networks.

In 1994, ABC Radio Networks ceased syndication of their Top 40 "Heat" format. KCHT changed their call letters to KOQQ, and then KKBB, and adopted a classic rock music format branded as "B Rock 99". The format lasted until 2003, when it flipped to rhythmic oldies and rebranded as Groove 99.3.

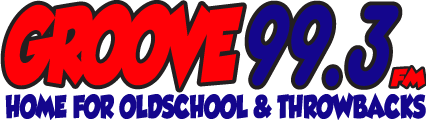
Previous logo

In October 2025, the station, alongside the rest of the Connoisseur Media Bakersfield cluster, was sold to locally based Frequency Media; the sale closed on April 1, 2026. On March 31, at 10 p.m., after playing "Raspberry Beret" by Prince, KKBB abruptly dropped the "Groove" format and began stunting with a loop of "Baby Shark" by Pinkfong, a stunt that within hours would also begin simulcasting on KLLY.

== Airstaff ==
The current weekday line-up on this station includes local hosts Adili in the mornings, Danny P on mid-days, Emilio on afternoons, R-DUB on nights.
