= KBFP (AM) =

Simulcasting KHTY, Bakersfield, CA
- Bakersfield, California; United States
- Frequency: 800 kHz
- Branding: Fox Sports 800 & 970

Programming
- Format: Sports
- Affiliations: Fox Sports Radio; Motor Racing Network; Performance Racing Network; Bakersfield Condors; Los Angeles Lakers Radio Network; Los Angeles Dodgers Radio Network

Ownership
- Owner: iHeartMedia, Inc.; (iHM Licenses, LLC)
- Sister stations: KBFP-FM, KDFO, KHTY, KRAB

History
- First air date: 1959
- Former call signs: KIKK (1959–1960); KUZZ (1960–1977); KHIS (1977–2001); KDFO (2001–2006)
- Call sign meaning: "Bakersfield La Preciosa" (previous format)

Technical information
- Licensing authority: FCC
- Facility ID: 28846
- Class: B
- Power: 1,000 watts (day); 440 watts (night)
- Transmitter coordinates: 35°20′44″N 118°59′33″W

Links
- Public license information: Public file; LMS
- Webcast: Listen live (via iHeartRadio)
- Website: foxsports970am.iheart.com

KBFP (800 AM) is a radio station licensed to Bakersfield, California, United States, and serves inland central California. Owned by iHeartMedia, it carries a sports format simulcasting KHTY (970 AM), with studios and transmitter located in Bakersfield.

In August 2014, KBFP switched from the 24/7 Comedy satellite feed to the "Today's Comedy" feed after the 24/7 Comedy format ceased operations.

On June 13, 2022, KBFP changed their format from comedy to a simulcast of sports-formatted KHTY 970 AM Bakersfield.
