= KUZZ =

KUZZ and KUZZ-FM

Bakersfield, California; United States
- Frequencies: KUZZ: 550 kHz; KUZZ-FM: 107.9 MHz
- Branding: KUZZ AM 55/FM 107.9

Programming
- Format: Country
- Affiliations: Compass Media Networks; Westwood One

Ownership
- Owner: Buck Owens Production Company, Incorporated
- Sister stations: KCWR, KRJK

History
- First air date: KUZZ: 1947; KUZZ-FM: 1966
- Former call signs: KUZZ: KAFY (1950–1986); KUZZ (1986–1990); KCWR (1990–1997); KUZZ-FM: KBBY-FM (1966–1969); KKXX-FM (1977–1988); KZIN-FM (1969–1977)
- Former frequencies: KUZZ: 1490 kHz (1947–1950)
- Call sign meaning: After "Cousin" Herb Henson, local TV star and station manager prior to Buck Owens' purchase of station

Technical information
- Licensing authority: FCC
- Facility ID: KUZZ: 7695; KUZZ-FM: 7697
- Class: KUZZ: B; KUZZ-FM: B
- Power: KUZZ: 5,000 watts
- ERP: KUZZ-FM: 6,000 watts
- HAAT: KUZZ-FM: 416 meters (1,365 ft)
- Transmitter coordinates: KUZZ: 35°20′24.9″N 118°56′22.4″W; KUZZ-FM: 35°26′16.8″N 118°44′27.4″W

Links
- Public license information: KUZZ: Public file; LMS; KUZZ-FM: Public file; LMS
- Webcast: Listen live
- Website: www.kuzz.com

KUZZ (550 kHz) and KUZZ-FM (107.9 MHz) are commercial radio stations licensed to Bakersfield, California. They are owned by Buck Owens Production Company (which is controlled by the estate of country star Buck Owens) and the licenses are held by Owens One Company Inc. They simulcast a country music format to Central California.

KUZZ's AM signal can extend over 100 miles, from the northern suburbs of Los Angeles up to Fresno, and between Barstow in the Mojave Desert to Santa Maria by the Pacific Ocean. The transmitter for both stations are sited off Breckenridge Road northeast of Bakersfield.

== History ==
KUZZ was KAFY on 1490 kHz in 1947. It moved to 550 kHz in 1950.

In 1958, KUZZ (then KIKK) first began broadcasting a country music format on 800 AM. In 1960, the station manager, a local country and western star named "Cousin" Herb Henson, changed the calls to KUZZ. In 1966, country music singer Buck Owens purchased the station and kept the country format. One year later in 1967, Owens also purchased the 107.9 frequency. When Owens purchased the frequency, he did not actually start playing country music. He started it out as an alternative rock station. The calls letters for the new 107.9 would be KBBY-FM.

In 1969 after low ratings at 107.9, Owens flipped the station to country and western and changed the call letters to KZIN-FM. KUZZ and KZIN were sister stations and both played a country format but KZIN differed from KUZZ by playing more new country than KUZZ. In 1977, plans were made to purchase rival country station AM 970 KBIS. During that same time 800 AM was being sold to the Church of the Foursquare Gospel, which was headquartered in Los Angeles. The plan for 800 AM was to flip the format from country to a Christian format.

In January 1977, 107.9 KZIN-FM flipped formats from country to an album oriented rock station. The first song on the new 107.9 was "New Kid In Town" by the Eagles. The new calls letters were KKXX-FM. At this time, 970 AM KUZZ became a full-time 24-hour country station (before then, it had been known as a "daytimer" and would only broadcast during the day and turn off at night). In 1984, Buck Owens increased the power of KUZZ to 5,000 watts and also purchased another AM country radio station, 550 KAFY.

A couple years later, management at the station 970 AM KUZZ and 550 KAFY, decided to exchange facilities. With music formats on the decline on the AM band, people were not listening to AM radio as in previous generations. In 1988, after competitors were saying they would bring country music to the FM dial, Owens decided to do that as well. He flipped rock station 107.9 KKXX to contemporary country KUZZ-FM. The logo of the station is an artist impression of Owens' famous red, white, and blue guitar, which he used throughout most of his career.

In 1990, KUZZ acquired Bakersfield television station channel 45. The call sign was changed to KUZZ-TV. In 1997, KUZZ sold the TV station to Univision so it could become an affiliate of that Spanish-language network. It is now Quest affiliate KUVI.
