= KWAC (AM) =

Radio station in Bakersfield, California

Currently silent
- Bakersfield, California; United States
- Broadcast area: Bakersfield and Vicinity
- Frequency: 1490 kHz

Ownership
- Owner: Northwestern Media

History
- First air date: 1956
- Former call signs: KMAP (1956–1961)

Technical information
- Licensing authority: FCC
- Facility ID: 35109
- Class: C
- Power: 640 watts
- Transmitter coordinates: 35°20′52.9″N 119°00′36.4″W

Links
- Public license information: Public file; LMS

KWAC (1490 AM) is a radio station licensed to Bakersfield, California, United States, that is currently silent. It is owned by Northwestern Media, with studios and transmitter located in Bakersfield.

== History ==
KWAC went on the air in 1956 as KMAP, owned by Morris Mindel. The station was sold in 1958 and became KWAC in 1961 when its owner, KMAP, Inc., was sold. The station previously had a Spanish language sports format as an affiliate of ESPN Deportes Radio. After ESPN Deportes Radio was discontinued on September 8, 2019, the station became an affiliate of TUDN Radio.

In April 2026, Lotus Communications donated the station to Northwestern Media of Roseville, Minnesota. KWAC is off the air but will return as a non-commercial Christian station.
