= Shafter, California =

City in California, United States

- City
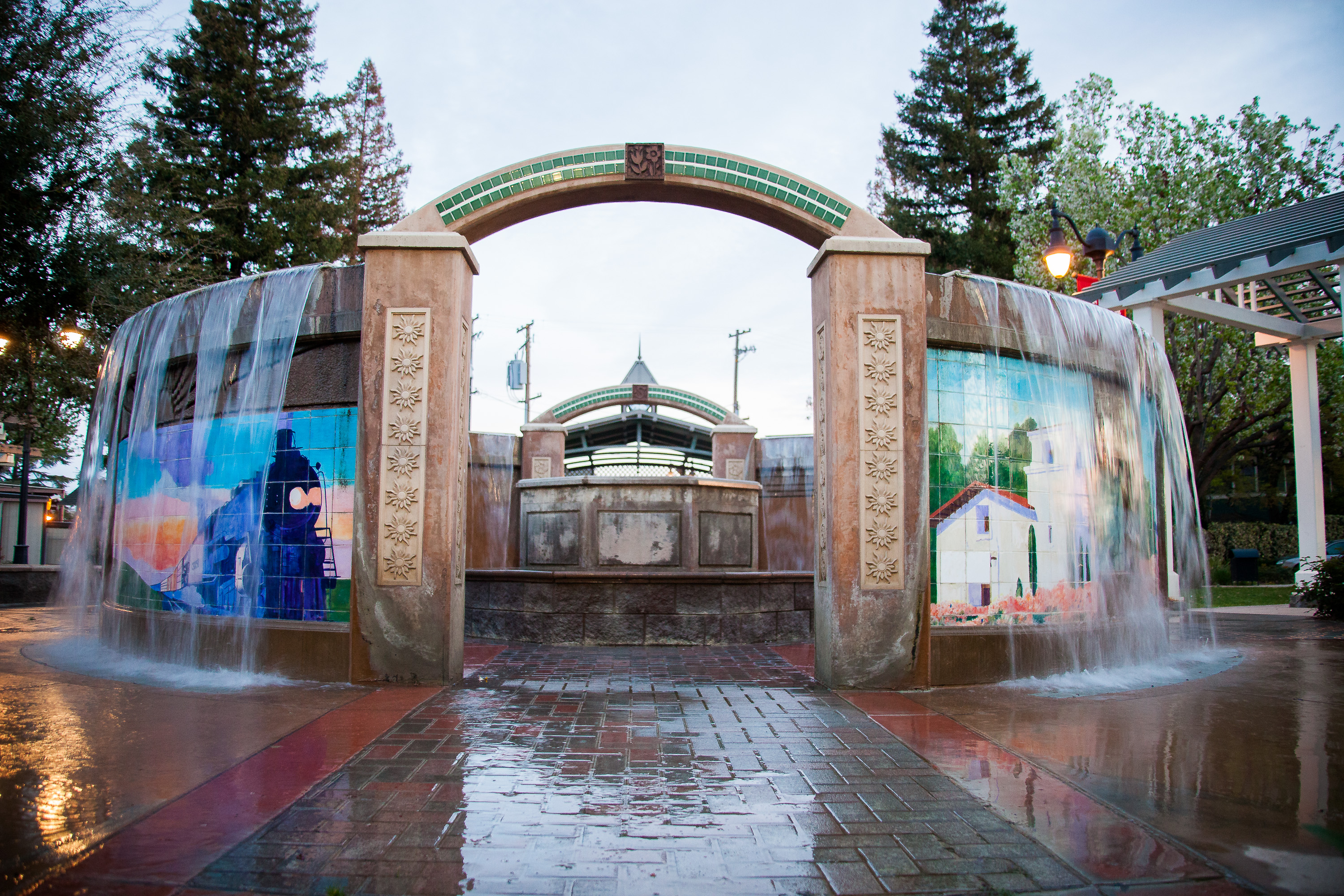
- Fountain in downtown Shafter

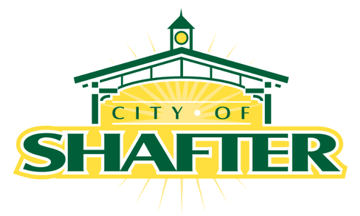
- Flag
- Interactive map of Shafter, California
- Location in the United States
- Coordinates: 35°30′02″N 119°16′18″W
- Country: United States
- State: California
- County: Kern
- Incorporated: January 20, 1938
- Named for: William Rufus Shafter

Government
  - Mayor: Chad Givens
  - State senator: Melissa Hurtado (D)
  - Assemblymember: Jasmeet Bains, M.D. (D)
  - U. S. Rep.: David Valadao (R)

Area
  - Total: 38.70 sq mi (100.22 km^{2})
  - Land: 38.70 sq mi (100.22 km^{2})
  - Water: 0 sq mi (0.00 km^{2}) 0%
- Elevation: 348 ft (106 m)

Population (2020)
  - Total: 19,953
  - Density: 515.65/sq mi (199.09/km^{2})
- Time zone: UTC-8 (PST)
  - Summer (DST): UTC-7 (PDT)
- ZIP code: 93263
- Area code: 661
- FIPS code: 06-71106
- GNIS feature IDs: 1661428, 2411873
- Website: www.shafterca.gov

Shafter is a city in Kern County, California, United States. It is located 18 miles (29 km) west-northwest of Bakersfield. The population was 19,953 at the 2020 census, up from 16,988 at the 2010 census. The city is located along State Route 43. Suburbs of Shafter include Myricks Corner, North Shafter, Smith Corner, and Thomas Lane.

== History ==
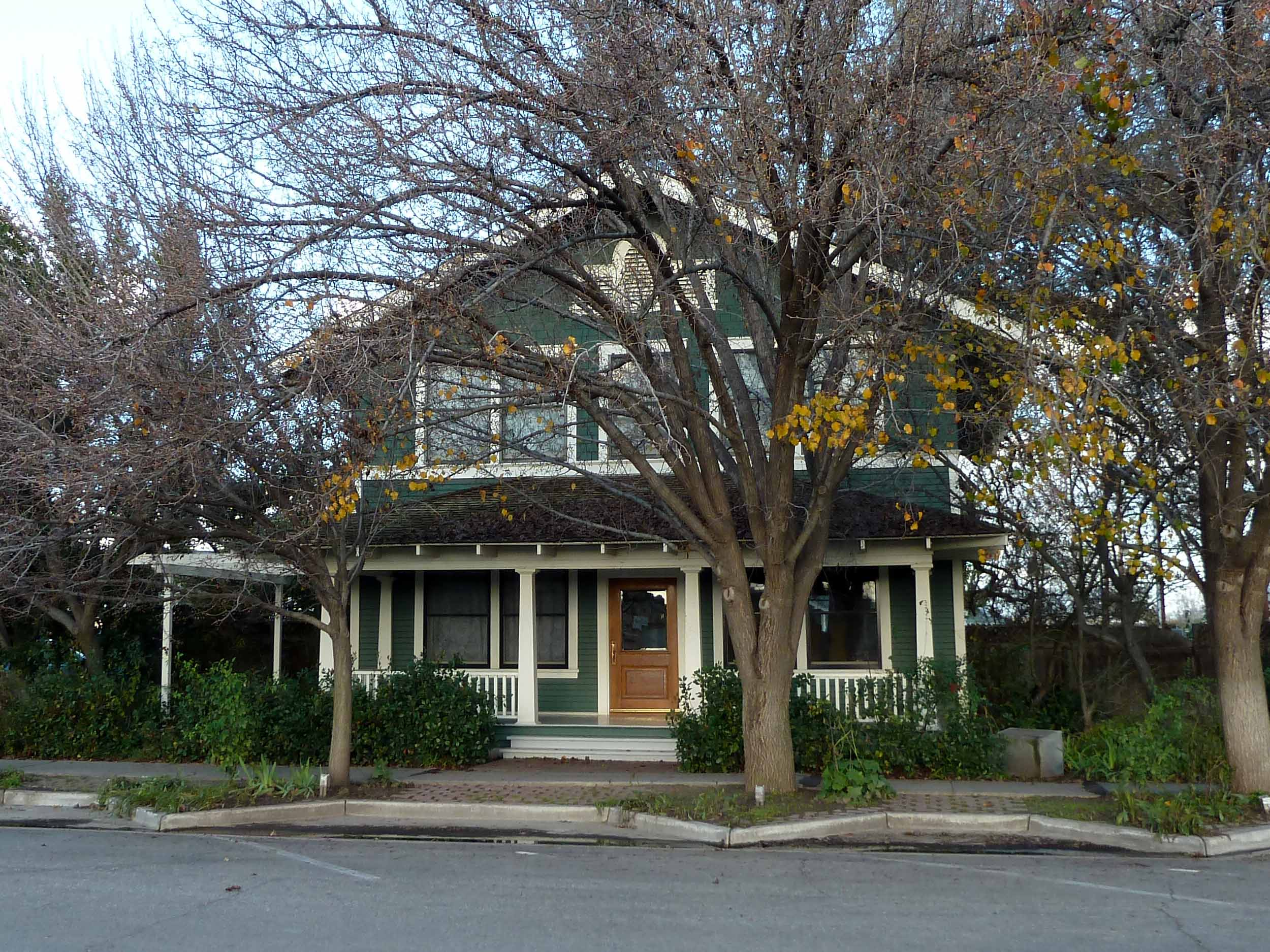
The Green Hotel.

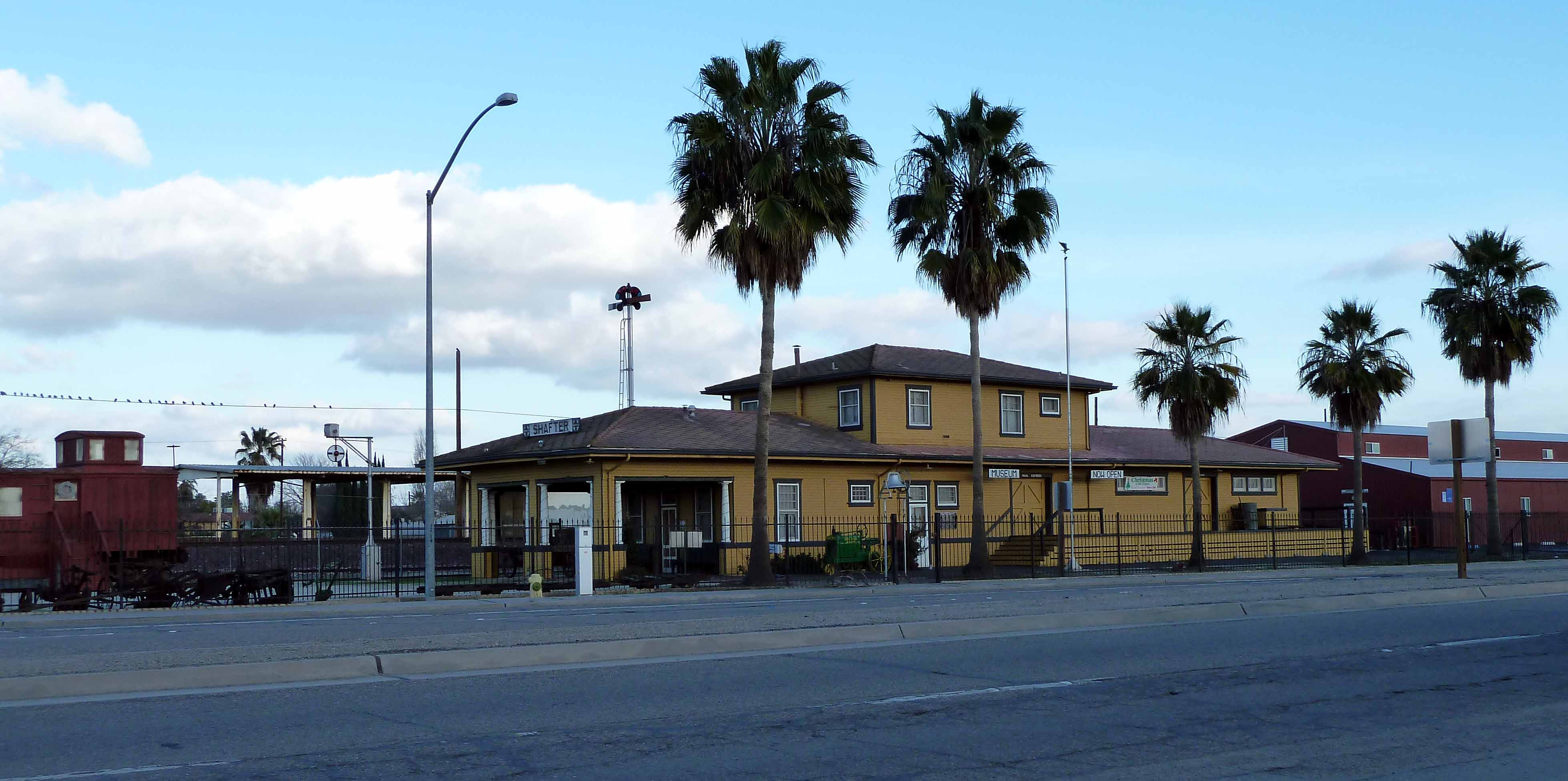
The Shafter Depot Museum is housed within the old Santa Fe Passenger and Freight Depot.

The city of Shafter began as a loading dock along the Santa Fe Railroad (former San Francisco and San Joaquin Valley Railroad) right-of-way. The community was named for General William Rufus Shafter who commanded US Forces in Cuba during the Spanish–American War. Property was sold beginning in 1914 and the city incorporated on January 11, 1938.

The first post office opened in 1898, moved in 1902, closed in 1905. A new postal service started in 1914.

Minter Field began operations in June 1941 and saw heavy use during World War II. Approximately 7,000 troops were stationed at the airstrip which held up to 600 prisoners of war. It is publicly owned and administered by the Minter Field Airport District and serves as an industrial center and airport for crop dusters and private aircraft. The Minter Field Museum is maintained on location as well.

The first successful human powered airplane, the Gossamer Condor, piloted by Bryan Allen won the Kremer prize on August 23, 1977, at Shafter's Minter Field. Allen piloted, and powered, the Paul MacCready designed airplane along the one mile long figure '8' course with two 10 foot high obstacles as specified by the Royal Aeronautical Society to claim the £50,000 prize. A California State Monument is located at the field for this event.

The Shafter Historical Society maintains two other museums. The Green Hotel and the Shafter Depot Museum emphasize various aspects of the daily lives of Shafter residents in years past; both structures are listed on the National Register of Historic Places.

In 2013 Shafter celebrated the 100 year anniversary of its founding. The Centennial Celebration included several events highlighting the history of the town, including a flyover of a PT-13 Training Plane that was stationed at Minter Field during World War II.

== Geography ==
Shafter has a total area of 38.70 square miles, all land. The US Census Bureau reported that based on the 2020 Census, Shafter is the population centroid of California. Half the state's population lives north (or south) of Shafter and half live east (or west) of the city.

=== Climate ===
Climate data for Shafter, California
Month	Jan	Feb	Mar	Apr	May	Jun	Jul	Aug	Sep	Oct	Nov	Dec	Year
Record high °F (°C)	81.0 (27.2)	86.0 (30.0)	93.0 (33.9)	101.0 (38.3)	109.0 (42.8)	113.0 (45.0)	115.0 (46.1)	113.0 (45.0)	111.0 (43.9)	105.0 (40.6)	92.0 (33.3)	81.0 (27.2)	115.0 (46.1)
Mean daily maximum °F (°C)	57.0 (13.9)	65.0 (18.3)	70.0 (21.1)	78.0 (25.6)	87.0 (30.6)	94.0 (34.4)	99.0 (37.2)	98.0 (36.7)	92.0 (33.3)	82.0 (27.8)	67.0 (19.4)	57.0 (13.9)	78.8 (26.0)
Mean daily minimum °F (°C)	37.0 (2.8)	40.0 (4.4)	43.0 (6.1)	47.0 (8.3)	53.0 (11.7)	59.0 (15.0)	63.0 (17.2)	62.0 (16.7)	58.0 (14.4)	49.0 (9.4)	40.0 (4.4)	34.0 (1.1)	48.8 (9.3)
Record low °F (°C)	19.0 (−7.2)	22.0 (−5.6)	26.0 (−3.3)	31.0 (−0.6)	39.0 (3.9)	43.0 (6.1)	49.0 (9.4)	46.0 (7.8)	41.0 (5.0)	29.0 (−1.7)	21.0 (−6.1)	14.0 (−10.0)	14.0 (−10.0)
Average precipitation inches (mm)	1.34 (34)	1.37 (35)	1.60 (41)	0.58 (15)	0.24 (6.1)	0.13 (3.3)	0.01 (0.25)	0.03 (0.76)	0.18 (4.6)	0.34 (8.6)	0.64 (16)	0.88 (22)	7.34 (186.61)
Source: The Weather Channel "Monthly Averages for Shafter, CA". The Weather Channel Interactive, Inc. 2011.

== Demographics ==
Historical population
Census	Pop.	Note	%±
1940	1,258		—
1950	2,207		75.4%
1960	4,576		107.3%
1970	5,327		16.4%
1980	7,010		31.6%
1990	8,409		20.0%
2000	12,736		51.5%
2010	16,988		33.4%
2020	19,953		17.5%
U.S. Decennial Census

=== Racial and ethnic composition ===
Shafter city, California – Racial and ethnic composition Note: the US Census treats Hispanic/Latino as an ethnic category. This table excludes Latinos from the racial categories and assigns them to a separate category. Hispanics/Latinos may be of any race.
Race / Ethnicity (NH = Non-Hispanic)	Pop 2000	Pop 2010	Pop 2020	% 2000	% 2010	% 2020
White alone (NH)	3,693	2,884	2,971	29.00%	16.98%	14.89%
Black or African American alone (NH)	181	148	290	1.42%	0.87%	1.45%
Native American or Alaska Native alone (NH)	59	73	28	0.46%	0.43%	0.14%
Asian alone (NH)	38	107	236	0.30%	0.63%	1.18%
Native Hawaiian or Pacific Islander alone (NH)	10	17	9	0.08%	0.10%	0.05%
Other race alone (NH)	6	14	116	0.05%	0.08%	0.58%
Mixed race or Multiracial (NH)	82	111	286	0.64%	0.65%	1.43%
Hispanic or Latino (any race)	8,667	13,634	16,017	68.05%	80.26%	80.27%
Total	12,736	16,988	19,953	100.00%	100.00%	100.00%

=== 2020 census ===
As of the 2020 census, Shafter had a population of 19,953. The population density was 515.6 inhabitants per square mile (199.1/km^{2}).

The census reported that 96.1% of the population lived in households, 0.5% lived in non-institutionalized group quarters, and 3.4% were institutionalized. 97.8% of residents lived in urban areas, while 2.2% lived in rural areas.

There were 5,204 households, out of which 57.6% included children under the age of 18, 56.4% were married-couple households, 9.0% were cohabiting couple households, 21.3% had a female householder with no spouse or partner present, and 13.3% had a male householder with no spouse or partner present. 11.0% of households were one person, and 4.3% were one person aged 65 or older. The average household size was 3.68. There were 4,417 families (84.9% of all households).

The age distribution was 32.5% under the age of 18, 10.9% aged 18 to 24, 30.1% aged 25 to 44, 18.3% aged 45 to 64, and 8.1% who were 65 years of age or older. The median age was 29.0 years. For every 100 females, there were 103.5 males, and for every 100 females age 18 and over there were 105.5 males age 18 and over.

There were 5,412 housing units at an average density of 139.9 units per square mile (54.0 units/km^{2}), of which 5,204 (96.2%) were occupied. Of the occupied units, 60.2% were owner-occupied, and 39.8% were occupied by renters. The homeowner vacancy rate was 1.0%, and the rental vacancy rate was 3.3%.

=== 2023 ACS 5-year estimates ===
In 2023, the US Census Bureau estimated that the median household income was $67,989, and the per capita income was $22,147. About 18.1% of families and 21.3% of the population were below the poverty line.

=== 2010 census ===
At the 2010 census Shafter had a population of 16,988. The population density was 607.9 inhabitants per square mile (234.7/km^{2}). The racial makeup of Shafter was 8,150 (48.0%) White, 219 (1.3%) African American, 198 (1.2%) Native American, 111 (0.7%) Asian, 19 (0.1%) Pacific Islander, 7,645 (45.0%) from other races, and 646 (3.8%) from two or more races. Hispanic or Latino of any race were 13,634 persons (80.3%).

The census reported that 16,323 people (96.1% of the population) lived in households, 148 (0.9%) lived in non-institutionalized group quarters, and 517 (3.0%) were institutionalized.

There were 4,230 households, 2,583 (61.1%) had children under the age of 18 living in them, 2,562 (60.6%) were opposite-sex married couples living together, 720 (17.0%) had a female householder with no husband present, 365 (8.6%) had a male householder with no wife present. There were 345 (8.2%) unmarried opposite-sex partnerships, and 34 (0.8%) same-sex married couples or partnerships. 446 households (10.5%) were one person and 203 (4.8%) had someone living alone who was 65 or older. The average household size was 3.86. There were 3,647 families (86.2% of households); the average family size was 4.11.

The age distribution was 6,121 people (36.0%) under the age of 18, 2,126 people (12.5%) aged 18 to 24, 4,666 people (27.5%) aged 25 to 44, 2,951 people (17.4%) aged 45 to 64, and 1,124 people (6.6%) who were 65 or older. The median age was 25.9 years. For every 100 females, there were 105.6 males. For every 100 females age 18 and over, there were 107.5 males.

There were 4,521 housing units at an average density of 161.8 per square mile, of the occupied units 2,471 (58.4%) were owner-occupied and 1,759 (41.6%) were rented. The homeowner vacancy rate was 2.2%; the rental vacancy rate was 6.9%. 9,552 people (56.2% of the population) lived in owner-occupied housing units and 6,771 people (39.9%) lived in rental housing units.

== Economy ==
Historically, much of Shafter's economy has been based on agriculture and ag-related industry. Local crops include almonds, pistachios, cotton, grapes and alfalfa as well as some carrots, potatoes and other vegetables. Cotton and potatoes have a special historical significance for the town of Shafter as leading industries in different periods of the town's development.

Shafter has become a hub for a variety of economic endeavors including; manufacturing, logistics, and energy.

Company	Year Established in Shafter
Amazon Fulfillment Center	2022
Ross Dress for Less	2015
FedEx Ground	2015
Target	2002
Richland School District	1914
Baker Hughes	2012
City of Shafter	1913
Kern High School District	1928 (Shafter High Founded)
MI Swaco/Schulmberger	2012
Williams-Sonoma	2008
The Garlic Company	1986
Global Fabricators	2005
Bidart Brothers	1993
Performance Food Group	2005
California Paper	2013
Cemex	2008
GAF	1993
Weatherford	2012
American Tire Distributors	2007
State Farm	2001
The Hillman Group	2000
GMC Roofing	2002
Grimmway Enterprises	
JD Rush	
Richland Chevrolet Co.	1947

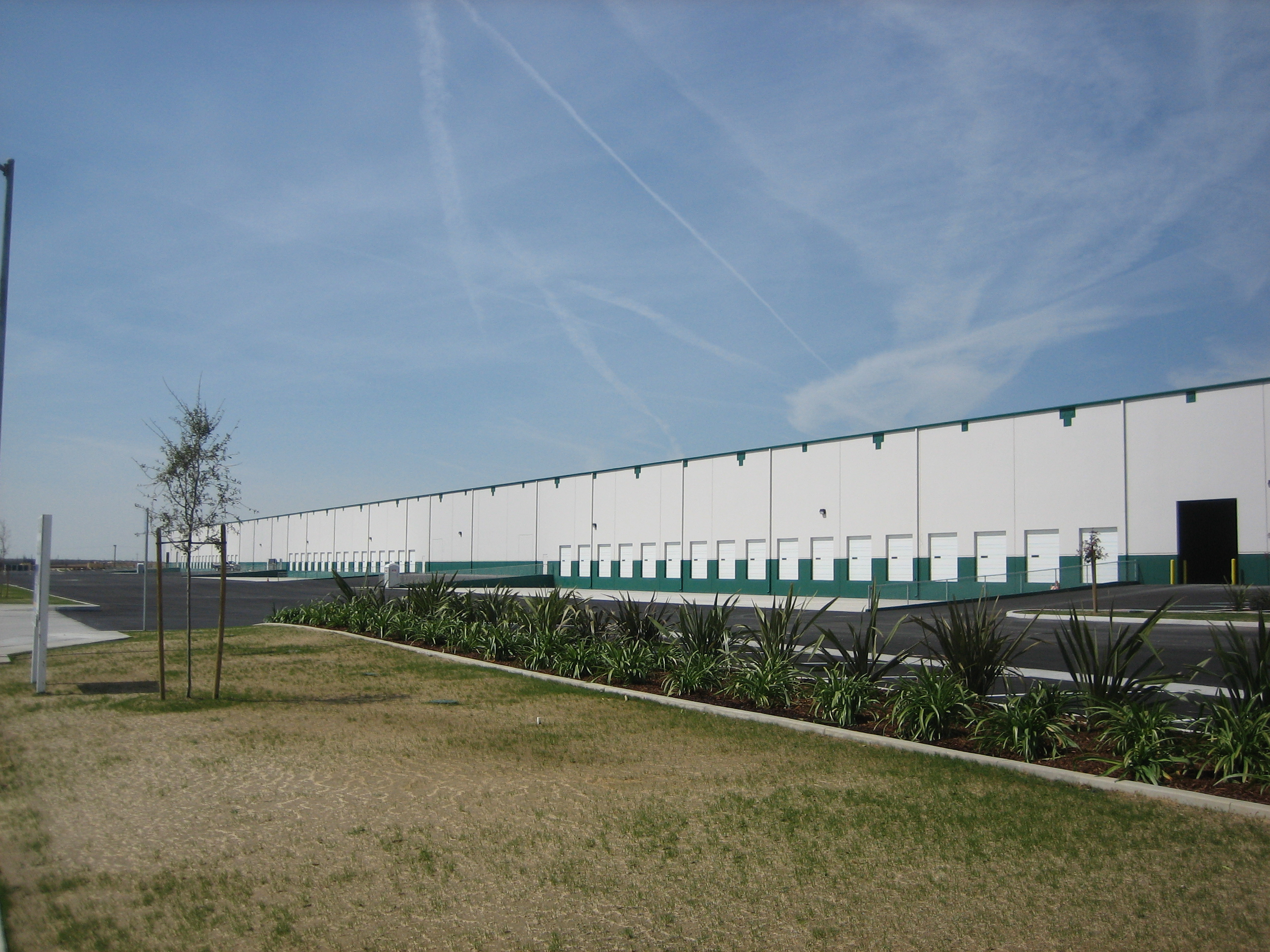
Logistics hub located in Shafter, California

=== Rail Facility ===
The City of Shafter's Rail Facility has more than 10,000 feet (3,000 m) of track owned by the City of Shafter and operated by the Public Works Department. It connects the BNSF Railway to tenants in the Paramount Logistics Park. The Paramount Logistics Park (PLP) (formerly the International Trade and Transportation Center (ITTC)) was built to facilitate Central Valley access to ports in Long Beach and Los Angeles. Ross Dress for Less announced its plans to move into the PLP in 2013.

American Tire Distributors signed a 20-year lease with Roll Real Estate to lease over 1 million square feet of distribution space.

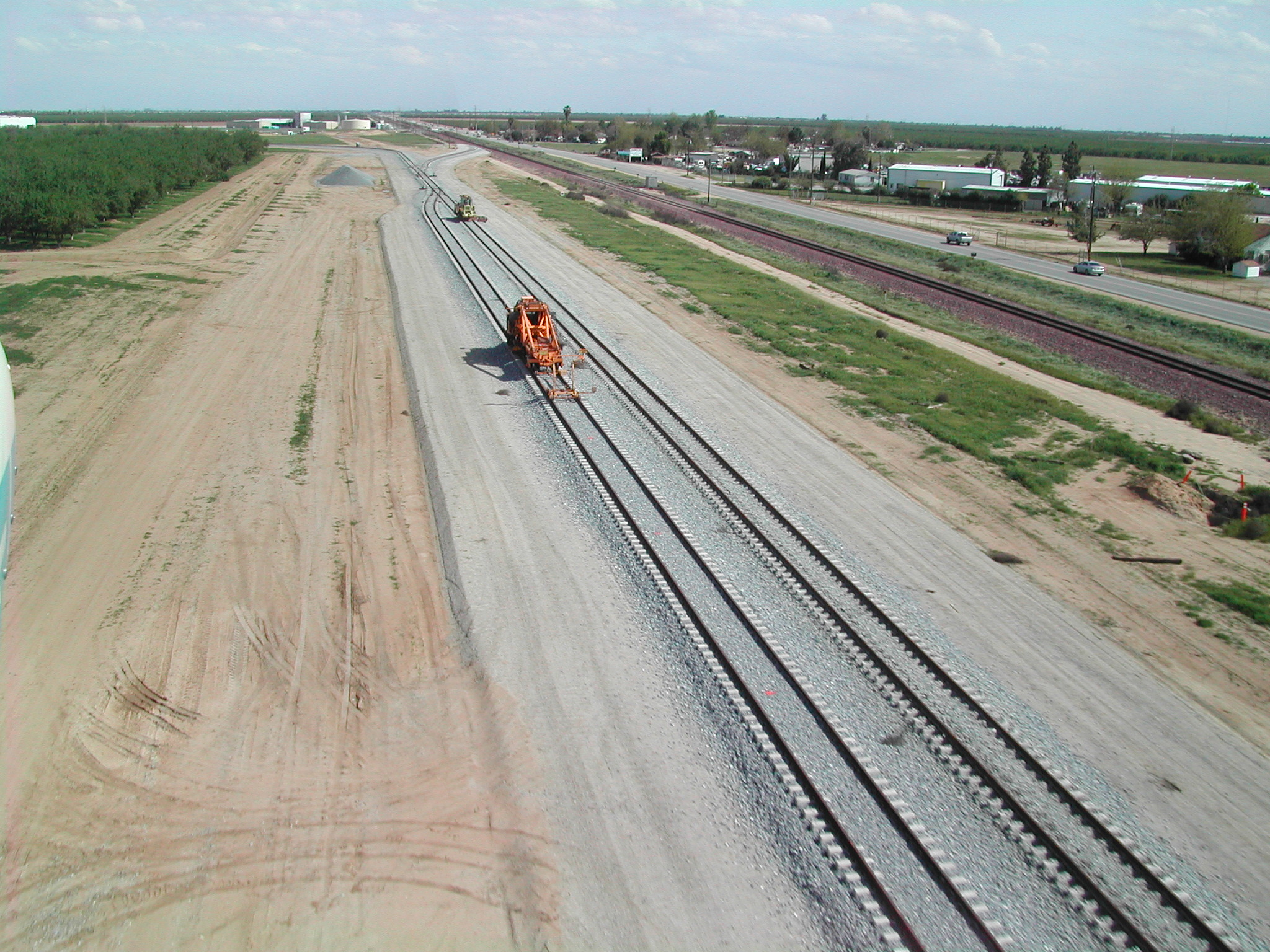
Shafter Rail Facility constructed to connect BNSF line to Paramount Logistics Park.

=== Modified Community Correctional Facility ===
The City of Shafter reopened the Shafter Modified Community Correctional Facility in 2013 after a two-year closure. Profits from the facility directly benefit public safety initiatives and the Shafter Education Partnership, focused on early literacy and college readiness.

=== Fiber-Optic Network ===
In 2006 the City of Shafter began construction on a 25-mile fiber-optic backbone ring. The city operates a 10 Gbit/s Ethernet network over the Shafter Connect network with near-zero unscheduled downtime since the network inception in 2007. The installed infrastructure will support 40 Gbit/s and faster speeds as technology standardizes. The network currently serves several areas of the city including:

- Shafter Core – Downtown municipal, educational and law enforcement facilities
- Minter Field Airport and Industrial Park development near Highway 99 and Lerdo Highway
- Paramount Logistics Park at 7th Standard Road and Zachary Avenue
- Future Residential/Commercial developments along 7th Standard Road between Calloway Drive and Zerker Road

The City of Shafter is the only municipality in the Central Valley that offers fiber-optic connections.

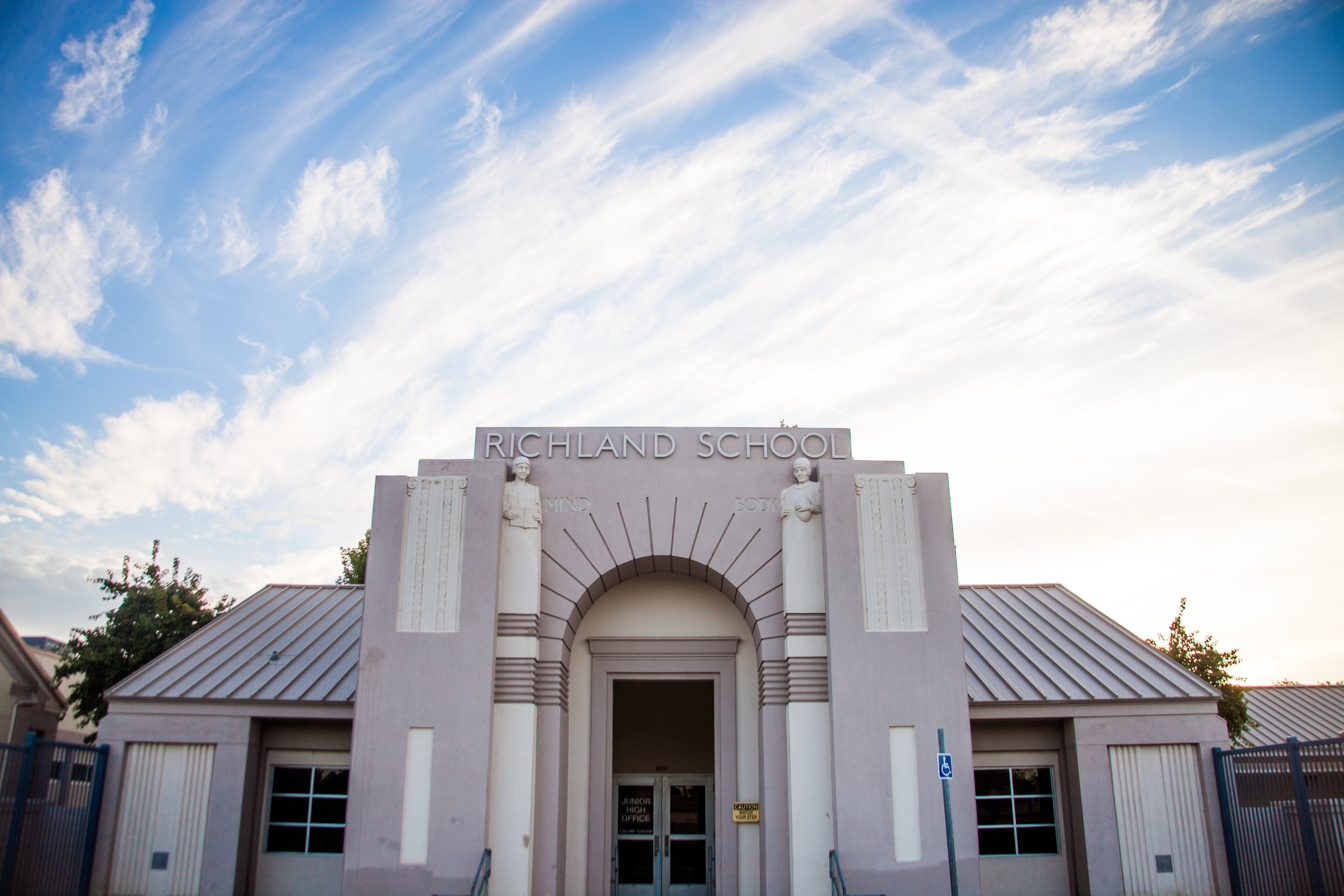
Richland Junior High

== Education ==
Shafter is home to the Richland School District which oversees operation of four schools: Golden Oak Elementary School (K-6), Redwood Elementary School (K-6), Sequoia Elementary School (K-6) and Richland Junior High School. The district has three libraries as well as a marching band program, Gifted And Talented Education (GATE), and Project Lead the Way’s Gateway to Technology Program.

Math has been a strength of Richland Schools in recent years. The percentage of Richland 8th graders scoring "Proficient" or "Advanced" in Algebra quadrupled from 2008 (8%) to 2013 (33%), earning the Richland Junior High Algebra Department an Award from the Shafter Chamber of Commerce in 2013. In 2014, Richland students placed in the top three in four of eight categories at the Kern County Math Field Day Competition.

In 2014, Mr. Claudio Martinez from Richland's Sequoia Elementary was honored as the regional GATE Teacher of the Year from the Regional California Association for the Gifted.

Shafter is also home to Shafter High School, a member of the Kern High School District. It was built by architects Edwin J. Symmes and Clarence Cullimore in the late 1920s. Officially founded in 1928, Shafter High School has a history as old as the town itself. Today, it is administered by Principal Russell Shipley. The school has undergone many recent renovations including the construction of a new cafeteria and new classroom space to meet the needs of a growing student body. The school is also home to the historical Fred L. Starrh Performing Arts Center, a large theater building with a fully functional fly system.

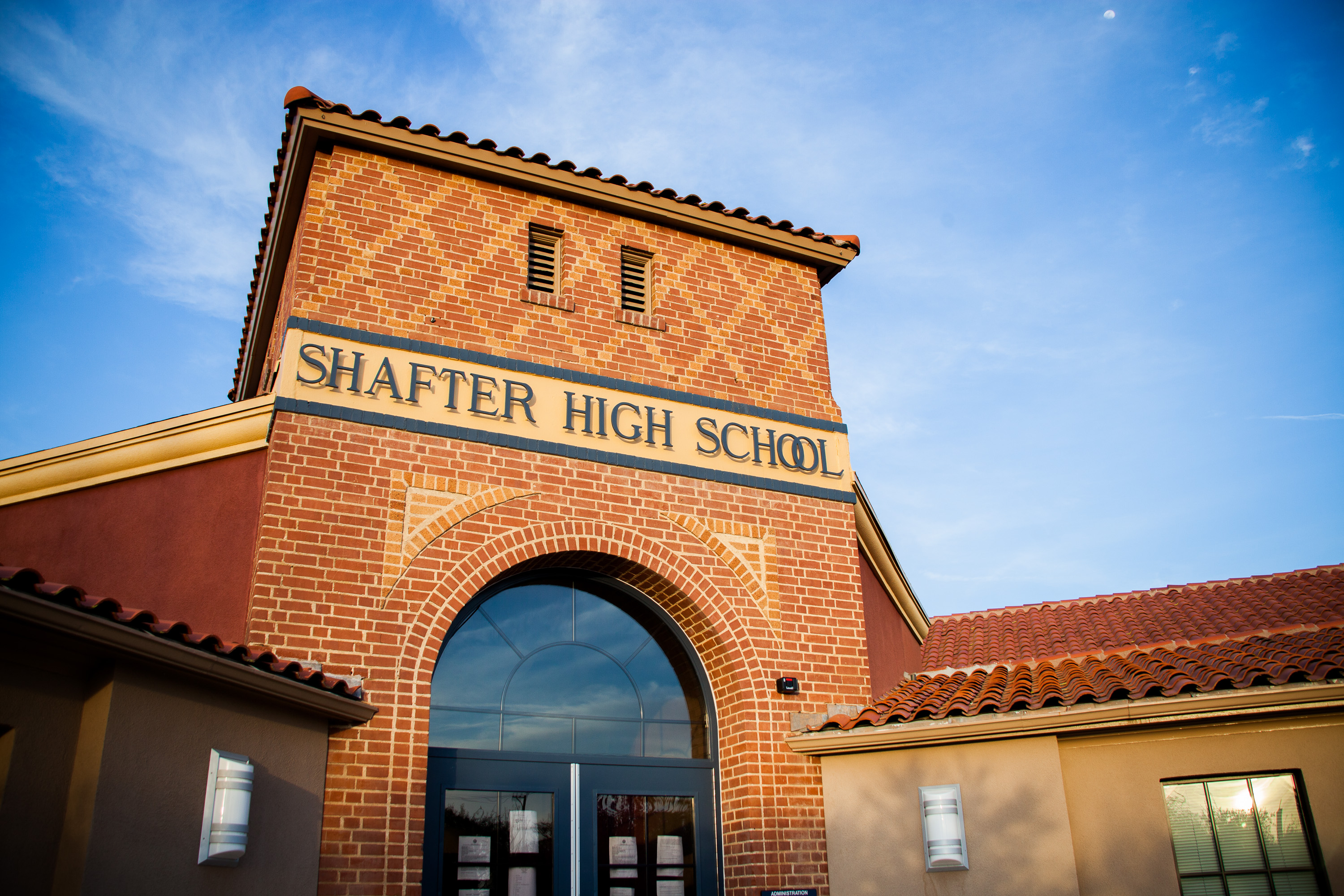
Shafter High School, located in Shafter, California

Shafter is also home to Kern Adventist Elementary. Kern Adventist Elementary is a small, one-teacher Christian school. It has been in operation for over 92 years.

=== Shafter Education Partnership ===
In 2010, the City of Shafter, the Richland School District, and Shafter High School formed the Shafter Education Partnership. The Partnership is funded by the City of Shafter with a 2014–15 budget allocation of $865,618.

In order to support its goal of forming a strong foundation in reading the Shafter Education Partnership distributes books for children to take home, offers summer and after school reading programs.

=== Shafter Learning Center ===
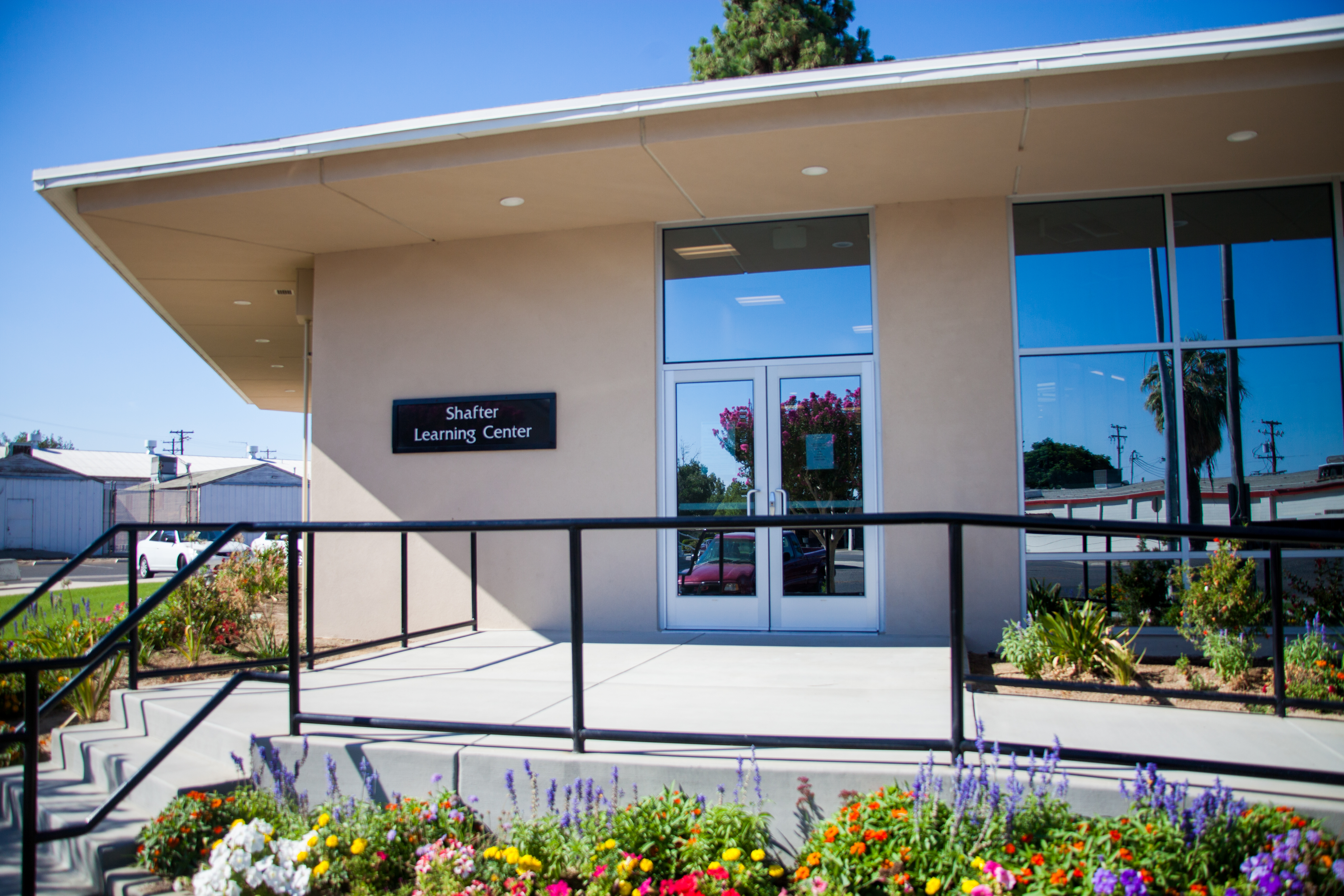
Shafter Learning Center

The Shafter Education Partnership, in conjunction with the Kern County Library and Richland School District, opened the Shafter Learning Center in June 2014. In that same year the building, which had housed the Shafter branch of the Kern County Library, was remodeled to include two classrooms and a computer lab. Classes are offered for students in the community and subjects range from math, keyboarding, art, science and reading to language courses. In 2021 the Kern County Shafter Library Branch closed. In response to the closure, the City of Shafter opened a municipal city library in the same building in partnership with Bakersfield College.

== Government ==
United States presidential election results for Shafter, California
Year	Republican		Democratic		Third party(ies)	
Year	No.	%	No.	%	No.	%
2000	1,415	55.34%	1,090	42.63%	52	2.03%
2004	1,577	60.65%	1,007	38.73%	16	0.62%
2008	1,548	48.80%	1,583	49.91%	41	1.29%
2012	1,282	44.84%	1,528	53.45%	49	1.71%
2016	1,406	40.90%	1,856	53.98%	176	5.12%
2020	2,566	48.42%	2,625	49.53%	109	2.06%
2024	3,673	60.63%	2,239	36.96%	146	2.41%

Mayors Name	Years in Office
Phil Ohanneson	1938–1942
William Bill Lachenmaier	1942–1944
Joe W. Frizzell	1946–1948
P.V. McClure	1948–1950
Adolf Kirschenmann	1950–1958
G.H. Ben Grundy	1958–1962
Harvey Gaede	1962–1964
Anthony B. Brown	1964–1964
Allen L. Zenk	1964–1968
J.C. Jay Atkinson	1968–1970
Wilmer Bill Hildebrand	1970–1972
Richard Larson	1972–1976
Elmer Unruh	1978–1982
Loyd Link	1982–1984
Donald Zachary	1984–1988
Cathy Prout	1988–1992
Linda Gragg	1992–1996
Garry Nelson	1996–2002
Fran Florez	2002–2006
Cathy Prout	2006–2010
Garry Nelson	2010–2012
Jon W. Johnston	2013–2014
Cathy Prout	2014–2019
Gilbert Alvarado	2019–2020
Cathy Prout	2020–2022
Chad Givens	2022–present

== Notable people ==
- Dean Florez – CA state senator, candidate Lt. Governor
- Annette Funicello – actress, singer, Mouseketeer; lived in Shafter for two years
- Anna Jelmini – track and field athlete
- Larsen Jensen – Olympic medalist in Swimming
- Joe O'Brien – Harness racing driver
- Jerry Quarry – heavyweight boxing contender, born in nearby Bakersfield, buried in Shafter
- Mary Margaret Revell – long-distance swimmer, runner and local historian
