= List of elected officials in Bakersfield, California =

This is a list of elected officials serving in the city of Bakersfield, California. They include: city officials (mayor), city council members, California state representatives, and United States federal representatives.

== City of Bakersfield ==
- Mayor – Karen Goh

=== City Council ===
- Ward 1 (Southeast) – Eric Arias
- Ward 2 (Downtown and East Bakersfield) – Andre Gonzales
- Ward 3 (Northeast) – Ken Weir
- Ward 4 (Northwest) – Bob Smith
- Ward 5 (Southwest – Seven Oaks) – Bruce Freeman
- Ward 6 (Southwest – Stockdale) – Patty Gray
- Ward 7 (South Bakersfield) – Manpreet Kaur (Vice Mayor)

Region names are not exact since district (ward) boundaries are based on population.

== California State Legislature ==
=== Assembly ===
- the 32nd Assembly district, represented by Republican Stan Ellis
- the 34th Assembly district, represented by Republican Tom Lackey

=== Senate ===
- the 14th senatorial district, represented by Democrat Anna Caballero
- the 16th senatorial district, represented by Democrat Melissa Hurtado

== United States Congress ==
=== House of Representatives ===
- California's 20th congressional district, represented by Republican Vince Fong
- California's 22nd congressional district, represented by Republican David Valadao

=== Senate ===
- Senior – Alex Padilla
- Junior – Adam Schiff
