= 2020 Bakersfield, California, mayoral election =

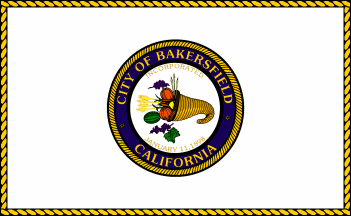
- March 3, 2020
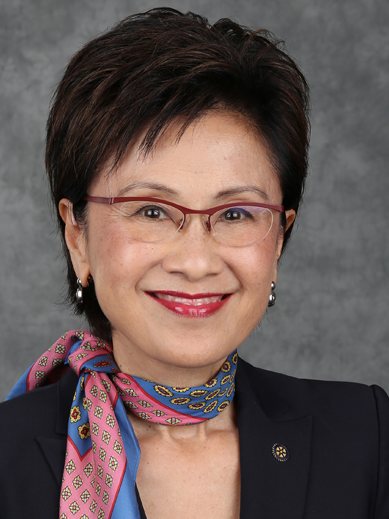

Candidate	Karen Goh	Gregory Tatum	Joseph Caporali
Popular vote	60,579	7,336	4,519
Percentage	83.53%	10.12%	6.23%
Mayor before election
Karen Goh
Elected Mayor
Karen Goh

Bakersfield, California, held a general election for mayor on March 3, 2020. It saw the re-election of incumbent Karen Goh.

Municipal elections in California are officially non-partisan.

== Candidates ==
=== Declared ===
- Joseph Caporali, military veteran and filmmaker; candidate for mayor in 2008
- Karen Goh, incumbent mayor and former Kern County supervisor (party preference: Republican)
- Joey Harrington (write-in), business owner
- Mark Hudson (write-in), business owner
- Gregory Tatum, military veteran and pastor; candidate for mayor in 2016 and State Senate in 2018 (party preference: Republican)

== Results ==
2020 Bakersfield mayoral election
Candidate	Votes	%
Karen Goh (incumbent)	60,579	83.53%
Gregory Tatum	7,336	10.12%
Joseph Caporali	4,519	6.23%
Mark Hudson (write-in)	74	0.10%
Joey Harrington (write-in)	15	0.02%
Total votes	72,523	100.00%
