= 2024 California's 20th congressional district special election =

- March 19, 2024 (first round); May 21, 2024 (runoff)

California's 20th congressional district
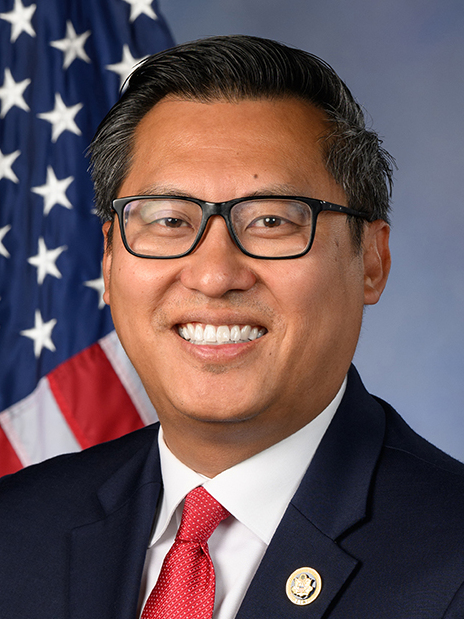

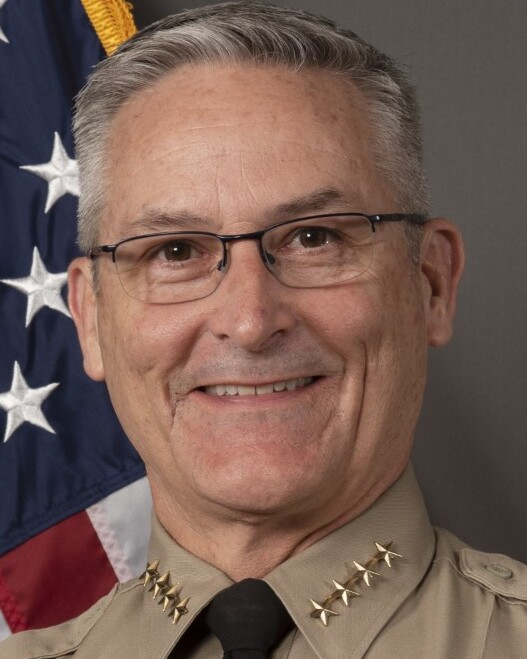

Candidate	Vince Fong	Mike Boudreaux	Marisa Wood
Party	Republican	Republican	Democratic
First round	51,194; 42.3%	31,202; 25.8%	27,337; 22.6%
Runoff	50,643; 60.6%	32,952; 39.4%	Eliminated
- Fong: 30–40% 50–60% 70–80% Boudreaux: 30–40% 50–60% 60–70% Tie: 50%
U.S. Representative before election
Kevin McCarthy
Republican
Elected U.S. Representative
Vince Fong
Republican

The 2024 California's 20th congressional district special election was held on March 19, 2024, with a runoff on May 21 because no candidate received more than 50% of the vote in the first round. It elected a new member of the United States House of Representatives to replace Kevin McCarthy, who resigned on December 31, 2023, following his removal as speaker of the House.

Two Republicans, Tulare County Sheriff Mike Boudreaux and state assemblyman Vince Fong, advanced to the runoff. Boudreaux narrowly edged out the leading Democrat, teacher Marisa Wood, to claim the second runoff spot. Fong won the runoff with more than 60% of the vote and won a full term in November 2024; Boudreaux dropped out of the November race but his name remained on the ballot.

== Background ==
At the start of the 118th Congress, Republicans' narrow majority garnered from the 2022 elections allowed McCarthy, the then-leader of the House Republican Conference, to be elected speaker at the start of the session. However, opposition from the far-right Freedom Caucus prolonged the election, leading to fifteen rounds of voting that eventually resulted in McCarthy's election. The caucus continued its opposition of McCarthy during his tenure, threatening a government shutdown following his involvement in negotiations for the federal budget. When McCarthy led the House in passing a continuing resolution, relying on votes from the Democratic Caucus to effectively avert a shutdown, Representative Matt Gaetz of Florida filed a motion to vacate the speakership. On October 3, the motion narrowly passed, and McCarthy was removed from the office of Speaker of the House, the first instance of which in American history.

Two months after his political defeat, McCarthy published an op-ed with The Wall Street Journal announcing his resignation from Congress, highlighting his accomplishments and stating that his work is "only getting started." His announcement came while House Republicans' majority had already lowered since the expulsion of Representative George Santos of New York, making the legislative agenda of the new speaker, Mike Johnson of Louisiana, more difficult to pass. As such, Republicans see both the special and general House elections in 2024 as crucial to maintaining their influence in Congress. Nonetheless, this district is considered safely Republican: McCarthy won 67.2% of the vote in 2022 against Democratic challenger Marisa Wood.

== Nonpartisan blanket primary ==
=== Campaign ===
Vince Fong, an assemblymember who was considered a protégé of McCarthy, announced that he would be running for the seat after initially declining to run. He was deemed ineligible to run in the 2024 Presidential Primary as the deadline already passed (but not ineligible for the special election) by California Secretary of State Shirley Weber due to Fong having already qualified to be on that ballot for re-election in the California State Assembly, which is prohibited by state law. Fong sued the state, with Superior Court judge Shelleyanne W. L. Chang ruling in favor of Fong and allowing him to run in the election. In response to the ruling, Weber appealed the ruling and assemblymember Wendy Carrillo introduced a bill that would prevent candidates from running for two elected offices at the same time. In January 2024, Weber filed a petition to a state appeals court to erase the ruling and prohibit Fong from running, while assemblywoman Gail Pellerin introduced a bill to bar candidates from filing to run for more than one office during the same election.

=== Candidates ===
==== Advanced to general ====
- Mike Boudreaux (Republican), Tulare County sheriff (2013–present)
- Vince Fong (Republican), state assemblyman for the 32nd district (2016–present)

==== Eliminated in primary ====
- James Cardoza (no party preference), real estate photographer
- Anna Cohen (Republican), high school employee
- Ben Dewell (no party preference), meteorologist and Democratic candidate for this district in 2022
- David Fluhart (no party preference), cannabis grower
- Kyle Kirkland (Republican), casino owner and chairman of the board for Fresno Chaffee Zoo
- Harmesh Kumar (Democratic), psychologist and perennial candidate
- Marisa Wood (Democratic), teacher and runner-up for this district in 2022

==== Declined ====
- Garry Bredefeld (Republican), Fresno city councilor (ran for the Fresno County Board of Supervisors)
- John Burrows (Democratic), spokesman for Fresno city councilor Nelson Esparza (endorsed Wood)
- Tal Eslick (Republican), political consultant and former chief of staff for U.S. Representative David Valadao
- Shannon Grove (Republican), state senator for the 12th district (2018–present) and former senate minority leader (2019–2021) (endorsed Boudreaux)
- Devon Mathis (Republican), state assemblyman for the 33rd district (2014–present) (endorsed Boudreaux)
- Jim Patterson (Republican), state assemblyman for the 32nd district (2016–present), former mayor of Fresno (1993–2001), and candidate for this district (Note: Numbered as the 21st district prior to the 2010 redistricting cycle and as the 22nd district from then until the 2020 redistricting cycle.) in 2002 and the 9th district (Note: Numbered as the 19th district prior to the 2020 redistricting cycle.) in 2010
- Cole Rajewski (Republican), political consultant and former chief of staff for U.S. Representative David Valadao
- Pete Vander Poel (Republican), Tulare County supervisor (ran for re-election)

=== Endorsements ===
Mike Boudreaux (R)

U.S. executive branch officials

- Richard Grenell, acting director of National Intelligence (2020), U.S. Ambassador to Germany (2018–2020)

U.S. representatives

- Connie Conway, former U.S. representative from California's 22nd congressional district (2022–2023)

State legislators

- Shannon Grove, state senator for the 12th district (2018–present) and former senate minority leader (2019–2021)
- Devon Mathis, state assemblyman for the 33rd district (2014–present)
- Andy Vidak, former state senator for the 14th district (2013–2018)

Individuals

- Kash Patel, former Trump aide

Organizations

- California ProLife Council
- California Republican Assembly
- California Rifle and Pistol Association (co-endorsement with Fong)

Labor unions

- International Brotherhood of Teamsters joint council 7

Newspapers

- The Fresno Bee
Vince Fong (R)

Executive branch officials

- Donald Trump, 45th president of the United States (2017–2021)

U.S. representatives

- Ken Calvert, U.S. representative from California's 41st congressional district (1993–present)
- John Duarte, U.S. representative from California's 13th congressional district (2023–present)
- Darrell Issa, U.S. representative from California's 48th congressional district (2001–2019, 2021–present)
- Mike Johnson, U.S. representative from LA-4 (2017–present) and speaker of the U.S. House of Representatives (2023–present)
- Kevin Kiley, U.S. representative from California's 3rd congressional district (2023–present)
- Young Kim, U.S. representative from California's 40th congressional district (2021–present)
- Doug LaMalfa, U.S. representative from California's 1st congressional district (2015–present)
- Kevin McCarthy, U.S. representative from California's 20th congressional district (2007–2023) and speaker of the U.S. House of Representatives (2023)
- Tom McClintock, U.S. representative from California's 5th congressional district (2009–present)
- Jay Obernolte, U.S. representative from California's 8th congressional district (2021–present)
- Michelle Steel, U.S. representative from California's 45th congressional district (2021–present)

Local officials

- Karen Goh, mayor of Bakersfield (2017–present)

Organizations

- California Rifle and Pistol Association (co-endorsement with Boudreaux)
- Howard Jarvis Taxpayers Association
- National Rifle Association Political Victory Fund
- Susan B. Anthony List

Labor unions

- National Border Patrol Council
Marisa Wood (D)

Individuals

- John Burrows, spokesman for Fresno city councilor Nelson Esparza and former candidate for this seat in the 2024 general election

=== Debate ===
2024 California's 20th congressional district special election primary debate
No.	Date	Host	Moderator	Link	Republican	Republican	Democratic	Democratic
Key: P Participant A Absent N Not invited I Invited W Withdrawn								
Key: P Participant A Absent N Not invited I Invited W Withdrawn					Mike Boudreaux	Vince Fong	Andy Morales	Marisa Wood
1	Feb. 22, 2024	KGET; KGPE	Brian Dorman; Jim Scott	YouTube	P	P	P	P

=== Results ===
2024 California's 20th congressional district primary
Party	Candidate	Votes	%
Republican	Vince Fong	51,194	42.3
Republican	Mike Boudreaux	31,202	25.8
Democratic	Marisa Wood	27,337	22.6
Republican	Kyle Kirkland	5,941	4.9
Democratic	Harmesh Kumar	2,885	2.4
No party preference	Ben Dewell	1,074	0.9
No party preference	David Fluhart	878	0.7
No party preference	James Cardoza	298	0.2
Republican	Anna Cohen	289	0.2
Total votes		121,098	100.0

By county

County	Vince Fong Republican		Mike Boudreaux Republican		Marisa Wood Democratic		Kyle Kirkland Republican		Harmesh Kumar Democratic		Ben Dewell Independent		David Fluhart Independent		James Cardoza Independent		Anna Cohen Republican		Margin		Total votes
County	#	%	#	%	#	%	#	%	#	%	#	%	#	%	#	%	#	%	#	%	Total votes
Fresno	12,137	34.33	8,927	25.25	8,833	24.98	3,172	8.97	1,371	3.88	473	1.34	234	0.66	123	0.35	85	0.24	23,218	28.79	35,355
Kern	33,430	55.42	13,004	21.56	10,007	16.59	1,645	2.73	1,045	1.73	491	0.81	446	0.74	159	0.26	95	0.16	26,892	33.47	60,322
Kings	2,315	29.10	3,083	38.75	1,676	21.07	512	6.44	129	1.62	52	0.65	33	0.41	31	0.39	26	0.33	4,774	26.26	7,857
Tulare	3,012	18.66	8,407	52.08	3,569	22.11	567	3.51	318	1.97	95	0.59	110	0.68	45	0.28	18	0.11	7,734	25.03	16,141
Total	51,194	42.3	31,202	25.8	27,337	22.6	5,941	4.9	2,885	2.4	1,074	0.9	878	0.7	298	0.2	289	0.2	19,992	16.5	121,098

== General election ==
=== Endorsements ===
Mike Boudreaux (R)

U.S. executive branch officials

- Richard Grenell, acting director of National Intelligence (2020), U.S. Ambassador to Germany (2018–2020)

U.S. representatives

- Connie Conway, former U.S. representative from California's 22nd congressional district (2022–2023)

State legislators

- Shannon Grove, state senator for the 12th district (2018–present) and former senate minority leader (2019–2021)
- Devon Mathis, state assemblyman for the 33rd district (2014–present)
- Andy Vidak, former state senator for the 14th district (2013–2018)

Individuals

- Kash Patel, former Trump aide

Organizations

- California ProLife Council
- California Republican Assembly
- California Rifle and Pistol Association (co-endorsement with Fong)

Labor unions

- International Brotherhood of Teamsters joint council 7

Newspapers

- The Fresno Bee
Vince Fong (R)

Executive branch officials

- Donald Trump, 45th president of the United States (2017–2021)

U.S. representatives

- Ken Calvert, U.S. representative from California's 41st congressional district (1993–present)
- John Duarte, U.S. representative from California's 13th congressional district (2023–present)
- Darrell Issa, U.S. representative from California's 48th congressional district (2001–2019, 2021–present)
- Mike Johnson, U.S. representative from LA-4 (2017–present) and speaker of the U.S. House of Representatives (2023–present)
- Kevin Kiley, U.S. representative from California's 3rd congressional district (2023–present)
- Young Kim, U.S. representative from California's 40th congressional district (2021–present)
- Doug LaMalfa, U.S. representative from California's 1st congressional district (2015–present)
- Kevin McCarthy, U.S. representative from California's 20th congressional district (2007–2023) and speaker of the U.S. House of Representatives (2023)
- Tom McClintock, U.S. representative from California's 5th congressional district (2009–present)
- Jay Obernolte, U.S. representative from California's 8th congressional district (2021–present)
- Michelle Steel, U.S. representative from California's 45th congressional district (2021–present)

Local officials

- Karen Goh, mayor of Bakersfield (2017–present)

Organizations

- California Rifle and Pistol Association (co-endorsement with Boudreaux)
- Howard Jarvis Taxpayers Association
- National Rifle Association Political Victory Fund

Labor unions

- National Border Patrol Council

=== Polling ===
Poll source	Date(s) administered	Sample size (Note: Key: A – all adults RV – registered voters LV – likely voters V – unclear)	Margin of error	Mike Boudreaux (R)	Vince Fong (R)	Undecided
WPA Intelligence (Note: Poll sponsored by Fong's campaign)	April 1–3, 2024	400 (LV)	± 4.9%	30%	46%	24%

=== Results ===
2024 California's 20th congressional district special election
Party	Candidate	Votes	%
Republican	Vince Fong	50,643	60.58
Republican	Mike Boudreaux	32,952	39.42
Total votes		83,595	100.00

By county

County	Vince Fong Republican		Mike Boudreaux Republican		Margin		Total votes
County	#	%	#	%	#	%	Total votes
Fresno (part)	12,328	55.44	9,909	44.56	2,419	10.88	22,237
Kern (part)	31,774	73.21	11,626	26.79	20,148	46.42	43,400
Kings (part)	2,412	50.00	2,412	50.00	0	0.00	4,824
Tulare (part)	4,129	31.44	9,005	68.56	-4,876	-37.13	13,134
Total	50,643	60.58	32,952	39.42	17,691	21.16	83,595

== See also ==
- 2024 United States House of Representatives elections
- 118th United States Congress
- List of special elections to the United States House of Representatives
