= Bakersfield Department of Water Resources =

Agency overview
- Formed: 1976
- Headquarters: 1000 Buena Vista Road; 35°20′44″N 119°7′39″W
- Annual budget: $27 million (2009-10)
- Agency executive: Art Chianello, Water Resources Manager
- Website: bakersfieldcity.us/cityservices/water

The Bakersfield Department of Water Resources is a municipal utility in Bakersfield, California. Primarily it manages the city's water rights to the Kern River. Water is sent to water retailers that the city has contracts with, and recharge basins to seep into the groundwater table. The department also manages water distributions to most of Southwest Bakersfield and a small part of Northwest Bakersfield.

== History ==
=== Early history ===
In the 1860s, residents began developing the land in Kern County for agriculture. At that time, people would take from the river the amount of water they needed. As time went on, the amount of water available to downstream owners diminished as canals were constructed upstream. When the Calloway Canal was completed in 1879, it effectively cutoff all remaining water downstream. This led to a water war between Henry Miller/Charles Lux (downstream) and James Haggin/Lloyd Tevis (upstream). Court cases were filed over the water rights, known as Lux vs Haggin. The outcome would govern the rights to the Kern River through the present day, and set the precedent for similar cases throughout Western America.

The result of the case was a compromise. Two points of measure were established. The First Point of Measurement was just above Gordon's Ferry, today in Northeast Bakersfield. The Second Point of Measurement was near Enos Lane, which is today near Interstate 5. After measuring the water flow for a set number of seasons to get an average, 1/3 of the water that passed through the first point must be allowed to pass through the second point. The rest of the water would belong to the upstream canals and upstream riparian water rights.

The canals owned by Haggin would be consolidated into the Kern County Canal & Water Company (K. C. C. & W. Co.) in 1890. By 1906, Haggin's company would formally become a part of the Kern County Land Company, which Haggin was a partner. That company would continue to manage water for the agricultural interest in the area. In 1967, Kern County Land Company was purchased by Tenneco West, the first time the water rights were owned by an outside interest.

=== City Acquisition ===
Prior to the 1960s, there was no municipal water utility for the city of Bakersfield. Also, discussions over the Kern River did not include the city and primarily dealt with the farmers. Most of the water for the city at the time came from groundwater. Historically in large abundance, the city saw little reason to become involved in the discussion. By the mid-1960s, however, a problem began to develop. Groundwater wells owned by the California Water Service Company were routinely running dry and had to be deepened. The city was running a water deficit, using more water than was being replenished.

In 1967, the city commissioned a study to determine where the water went. Among other finding: two primary reasons were discovered. First, canals which ran through the city were lined with concrete to prevent water seepage. This also reduced the replenishment of groundwater used by the city. Second, as agricultural land was developed into urban use, water that previously irrigated it was redirected to develop other farmland further from the river. Also, Tenneco West was beginning to receive offers from other companies and Southern California water districts for purchasing its rights to the Kern River. With a real concern of the southern San Joaquin Valley suffering a similar fate as the Owens Valley (agricultural land became a desert when Los Angeles Department of Water and Power acquired water rights to the Owens River), the city moved to protect its rights.

First, the city went to Tenneco West to discuss its problem. However, those discussions yielded little results. As a result, the city, and the surrounding agricultural water districts requested a court decree establishing water rights to the Kern River, and establishing groundwater rights within the city. The city also condemned the first 77,000 acre-feet (95,000,000 m^{3}) of Kern River water and wanted payment for damages to any party that violated it. The action never made it to court because Tenneco West would settle with the city.

In 1973, Tenneco West would agree to sell all its water rights to the Kern River (about 1/3 of the total water through the First Point of Measurement), real estate, and infrastructure to the city for $18 million. After the final details were worked out, the citizens approved a bond measure for the purchase in 1976. This purchase resulted in the creation of the Bakersfield Department of Water Resources. It also created the Kern River Parkway, the largest urban park in the city.

=== Public Ownership ===
Much of the infrastructure along the Kern River had fallen into a state of disrepair. Many of the weirs, used to divert water into canals were falling apart. The First Point of Measurement consisted of a cable and a small measuring device while the Second Point of Measurement washed away in the 1966 flood and never replaced. Starting in 1977, the city undertook a massive reconstruction effort. Most of the weirs, and canal floodgates were reconstructed. The First and Second Points of Measurement were also reconstructed. Also, a 2,800-acre water bank was constructed. These projects were completed by 1985.

== Service Area ==
The Department of Water Resources currently has contracts to provide water to five agricultural water districts. It also provides water directly to customers in most of Southwest Bakersfield and part of Northwest Bakersfield.
