= Joseph C. Shell =

American politician

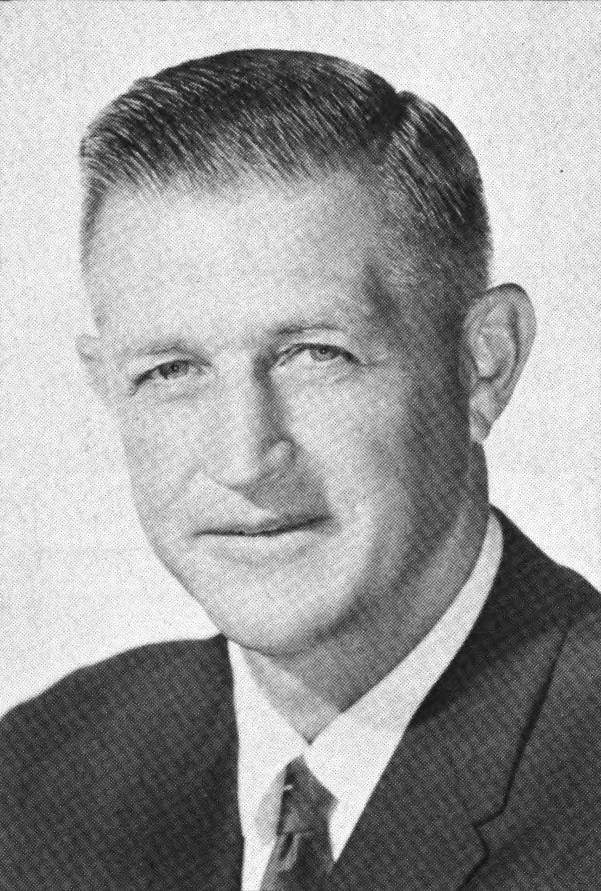
- Official portrait, 1961

Minority Leader of the California Assembly
- In office 1959–1963
- Preceded by: William A. Munnell
- Succeeded by: Charles J. Conrad

Member of the California State Assembly from the 58th district
- In office December 2, 1953 – January 7, 1963
- Preceded by: Laughlin Edward Waters Sr.
- Succeeded by: Harvey Johnson

Personal details
- Born: Joseph Claude Shell; September 7, 1918 La Conner, Washington, U.S.
- Died: April 7, 2008 (aged 89) Bakersfield, California, U.S.
- Party: Republican
- Spouse: Barbara Morton (m. 1940; div. 1968) Mary K. Shell (m. 1970)
- Children: 4
- Education: University of Southern California (B.S.)

Military service
- Branch/service: United States Navy
- Battles/wars: World War II

First Gentleman of Bakersfield
- In office January 6, 1981 – January 1, 1985
- Mayor: Mary K. Shell
- Preceded by: Margaret Hart (as first lady)
- Succeeded by: Rosa Payne (as first lady)

Joseph Claude Shell Sr. (September 7, 1918 – April 7, 2008) was a Republican politician from California who served in the California State Assembly from 1953 to 1963 from the 58th district. He later served on the California Agricultural Labor Relations Board. In 1962 he was a failed primary candidate for Governor of California, where he ran to the right of then former Vice President Richard Nixon.

Shell attended the University of Southern California, where he obtained a Bachelor of Science in Business Administration and was captain of the 1939 USC football team which won the Rose Bowl that year. He then served in the U.S. Navy during World War II.

His second wife was Mary K. Shell, a former member of the Kern County Board of Supervisors and the first female Mayor of Bakersfield.
