= Fruitvale =

Fruitvale may refer to:

== Places ==
=== Canada ===
- Fruitvale, British Columbia

=== New Zealand ===
- Fruitvale Road railway station, Auckland

=== United States ===
- Fruitvale, California (disambiguation), several places
  - Fruitvale, Fresno County, California
  - Fruitvale, Kern County, California
  - Fruitvale, Oakland, California
    - Fruitvale (BART station)
  - Fruitvale Oil Field, underneath Bakersfield, California
  - Fruitvale Bridge
- Fruitvale, Colorado
- Fruitvale, Idaho
- Fruitvale, Tennessee
- Fruitvale, Texas
- Fruitvale, Washington

== Other ==
- Fruitvale (album), a 2007 album by American musician Sonny Smith
- Fruitvale, original title of Fruitvale Station, a 2013 American independent drama film
