= 2012 Bakersfield, California, mayoral election =

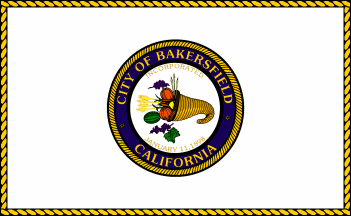
- June 5, 2012
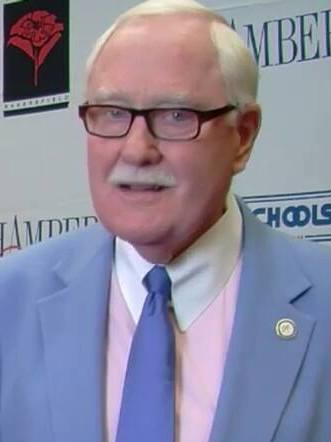
Candidate	Harvey Hall
Popular vote	34,776
Percentage	93.17%
Mayor before election
Harvey Hall
Republican
Elected mayor
Harvey Hall

Bakersfield, California, held a general election for mayor on June 5, 2012. It saw the reelection of incumbent mayor Harvey Hall, who ran officially unopposed.

The election coincided with the California presidential primaries. Since Hall obtained a majority in the initial round of voting, no runoff was necessitated.

Municipal elections in California are officially non-partisan.

== Results ==
Results
Candidate	Votes	%
Harvey L. Hall (incumbent)	34,776	93.17
