= Fruitvale School District =

School district in California, United States

Address
- 7311 Rosedale Highway Bakersfield, California, 93308; United States

District information
- Type: Public school district
- Motto: Striving for Excellence
- Grades: K–8
- Established: 1895
- Superintendent: Dr. Carl Olsen
- NCES District ID: 0614700

Students and staff
- Students: 3,055 (2020–2021)
- Teachers: 141.97 (FTE)
- Staff: 137.78 (FTE)
- Student–teacher ratio: 21.52:1

Other information
- Schedule: Nine-month
- Website: www.fruitvale.k12.ca.us

Fruitvale School District is a kindergarten - 8th grade public school district in Fruitvale, California. The district has five schools and serves Fruitvale and Northwest Bakersfield.

== Schools ==
- Columbia Elementary
- Discovery Elementary
- Endeavour Elementary
- Quailwood Elementary
- Fruitvale Junior High
