= 2008 Bakersfield, California, mayoral election =

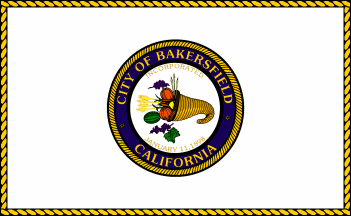
- June 3, 2008
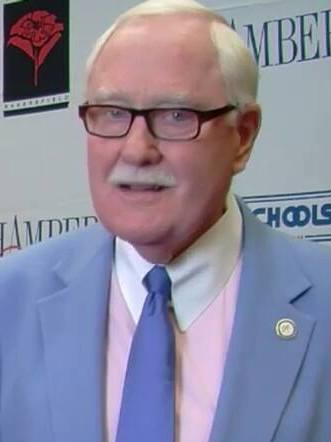

Candidate	Harvey Hall	Marc Deleon	Dennis Martinez
Party	Republican	Nonpartisan	Nonpartisan
Popular vote	26,033	3,953	3,544
Percentage	74.14%	11.26%	10.09%
Mayor before election
Harvey Hall
Republican
Elected mayor
Harvey Hall
Republican

Bakersfield, California, held a general election for mayor on June 3, 2008. It saw the reelection of incumbent mayor Harvey Hall.

Since Hall obtained a majority in the initial round of voting, no runoff was necessitated.

== Results ==
Results
Candidate	Votes	%
Harvey L. Hall (incumbent)	26,033	74.14
Marc Deleon	3,953	11.26
Dennis Martinez	3,544	10.09
Joseph Caporali	1,399	3.98
Total votes	34,929	
