= 2016 Bakersfield, California, mayoral election =

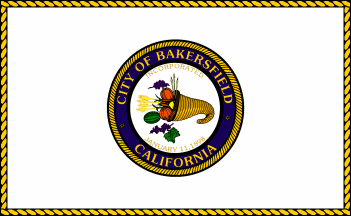
- June 7, 2016 (first round); November 8, 2016 (runoff)
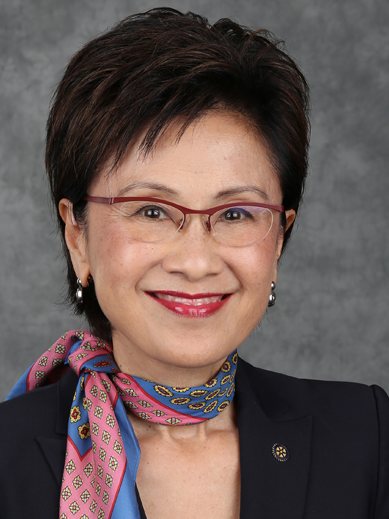

Candidate	Karen Goh	Kyle Carter	G. Alex Merrill
First-round vote	20,116	19,369	3,139
First-round percentage	33.03%	31.80%	5.15%
Second-round vote	59,355	53,157
Second-round percentage	52.75%	47.24%
Mayor before election
Harvey Hall
Elected mayor
Karen Goh

Bakersfield, California, held a general election for mayor on June 7, 2016, and November 8, 2016. It saw the election of Karen Goh.

Municipal elections in California are officially non-partisan.

== Results ==
=== First round ===
First round results
Candidate	Votes	%
Karen Goh	20,116	33.03
Kyle Carter	19,369	31.80
G. Alex Merrill	3,139	5.15
Anthony "T.J" Esposito	2,470	4.06
Tony Martinez	1,983	3.26
Gregory Tatum	1,570	2.58
Gilberto De La Torre	1,567	2.57
Nannette Gonzalez	1,477	2.43
Marc DeLeon	1,364	2.24
Addison Chavez	1,250	2.05
Kevin Blanton	1,232	2.02
Tanner Thompson	865	1.42
Tyrone Smith	722	1.19
Opal Morland	554	0.91
Brett Vigil	463	0.76
Roy Charles Keenan	415	0.68
Michael Harmon	392	0.64
Valiant Robinson	379	0.62
Kenneth Whitchard	363	0.60
Scott Monroe	327	0.54
Joseph Crotwell	274	0.45
Benjamin Weigel	265	0.44
William M. Minnick	174	0.29
Kameron Kephart	119	0.20
Nathan Nemnich	58	0.10
Total votes	60,907	100%

=== Runoff ===
Runoff results
Candidate	Votes	%
Karen Goh	59,355	52.75
Kyle Carter	53,157	47.24
Total votes	112,512	100%
