= Harvey Hall =

Harvey Hall may refer to:

- Harvey Hall (politician), American businessman and mayor of Bakersfield, California
- Harvey Hall (actor), English television and film actor
- Harvey Monroe Hall, American botanist
