= Mary K. Shell =

American politician

21st Mayor of Bakersfield
- In office January 6, 1981 – January 1, 1985
- Preceded by: Donald M. Hart
- Succeeded by: Thomas Anthony Payne

Member of the Kern County Board of Supervisors from District 5
- In office 1985–1996
- Preceded by: John Mitchell
- Succeeded by: Pete Parra

Personal details
- Born: Mary Katherine Jaynes; February 9, 1927 Bakersfield, California, U.S.
- Died: May 19, 2018 (aged 91) Bakersfield, California, U.S.
- Party: Republican
- Spouses: Don Stickler (divorced); Richard Hosking (m. 1948; div. 1969); Joseph C. Shell (m. 1970; died 2008)
- Children: 3
- Education: East Bakersfield High School
- Alma mater: Bakersfield College (dropped out)

Mary Katherine Shell (née Jaynes; February 9, 1927 — May 19, 2018) was an American Republican politician who served as the 23rd Mayor of Bakersfield for a single term between 1981 and 1985. She was Bakersfield's first female mayor. She also served as a member of the Kern County Board of Supervisors.

== Biography ==
Shell was born Mary Katherine Jaynes on February 9, 1927, in Bakersfield, California. She worked in her father's auto shop as a child, later becoming a news reporter at 17, and wrote for The Bakersfield Californian. She attended Bakersfield College, but dropped out shortly before graduation, instead choosing to work a variety of jobs relating to agriculture and aviation before becoming a political organizer. During this time, she also earned a pilot's license.

Her third husband was Joseph C. Shell, a California Assemblyman and World War II navy veteran. They met when Shell worked on his gubernatorial campaign for the 1962 election.

Following her husband's retirement from politics, she again wrote for The Bakersfield Californian and worked in the oil industry alongside him.

== Mayor of Bakersfield ==
Shell decided to run for mayor in the 1980 election, and came narrowly behind Kern County Sheriff Charles Dodge in the primary. She won the runoff with 61% of the vote and became the first female Mayor of Bakersfield.

Shell attempted to connect with the city's minorities, and tried to clean up the city, creating a city beautification committee called the Beautiful Bakersfield Committee. Shell also established a historic preservation commission, created a city flag, and created one of the first Vietnam War memorials in the U.S. She also relaunched the city's Downtown Christmas parade and established the annual Bakersfield Prayer Breakfast.

Because Bakersfield uses a weak mayor system of government, her role was largely ceremonial, so she decided to not seek reelection in 1984, and was succeeded by Thomas Anthony Payne.

== Later life ==
Shell served three terms on the Kern County Board of Supervisors between 1985 and 1996, being an opponent of government regulation. She was the second woman to serve on the Board of Supervisors. Pete Parra succeeded her on the county board after her retirement. She considered running for the State Senate's 15th district, but decided against it. Shell died in Bakersfield in 2018.

The Mary K. Shell Mental Health Center in Bakersfield is named after her.

Political offices
Preceded by Donald M. Hart	Mayor of Bakersfield; 1981–1985	Succeeded by Thomas Anthony Payne
