= Fruitvale, California =

Fruitvale, California may refer to:

- Fruitvale, Fresno County, California
- Fruitvale, Kern County, California
- Fruitvale, Oakland, California
