= Richard Nixon's November 1962 press conference =

Historic press conference

Richard Nixon during his "last press conference"

The "last press conference" of US politician Richard Nixon took place on November 7, 1962, following his loss in the 1962 California gubernatorial election to Democratic incumbent Pat Brown. Appearing before 100 reporters at the Beverly Hilton Hotel, Nixon lashed out at the media, proclaiming that "you don't have Nixon to kick around any more, because, gentlemen, this is my last press conference." (Note: The statement "you don't have Nixon to kick around anymore" has been widely reported as "you won't have Nixon to kick around anymore".)

Nixon's electoral loss in his home state, failing to capture what was then a traditionally Republican state that he had carried in the 1960 presidential election, combined with his actions at the press conference, was seen at the time as permanently damaging his chances at playing a role in national politics. Nixon would ultimately win the presidency six years later in the 1968 election, making a political comeback that seemed nearly impossible after the "last press conference".

== 1962 California gubernatorial election ==
At the time, California had been considered a reliably Republican stronghold. Following World War II, all of the state's governors and US Senators had been Republican until Pat Brown was elected Governor of California and Clair Engle was elected U.S. Senator in 1958, bucking the trend.

US President Dwight Eisenhower, with Nixon as his vice presidential running mate, had carried California in both 1952 and 1956, and Nixon defeated John F. Kennedy there in the 1960 presidential election. Nixon was widely viewed by the California Republican Party as its best hope for defeating the popular Brown to retake the governor's mansion, itself perceived as a prominent stepping stone for a rematch against Kennedy in 1964.

Early polling showed Nixon winning by a significant margin. The polls showed Brown, who made a point of not beginning to campaign until late in the season, closing the margin in the days before the election, but Nixon was still favored to win. Brown won the election, and the 5% margin stunned Nixon and political pundits nationwide. (Note: Brown famously said that he would not even decide to run until "the snow flies in the Sierra".)

== Press conference ==
As election results came in on Tuesday, November 6, Nixon and his staff monitored results at a suite in the Beverly Hilton Hotel in what was becoming a tighter race than expected. Nixon's press secretary Herbert G. Klein held a news conference at 2:30 a.m. on Wednesday, telling the assembled reporters that despite trailing Brown by 90,000 votes at that time, Nixon was going to bed without issuing a concession, as there appeared to be sufficient uncounted votes in reliably Republican Orange County and San Diego County to overturn Brown's margin.

As the night progressed, the returns showed a tide of additional votes for Brown, who had pulled 250,000 votes ahead of Nixon. By 10 a.m. on Wednesday, Nixon sent a congratulatory telegram to Brown that read, "Congratulations on your re-election as Governor. I wish you the best in your great honor and opportunity which you now have to lead the first state in the nation." Klein appeared before the press and started his press conference with the announcement that Nixon would not speak to the media; 10 minutes into Klein's press conference, an aide notified him that Nixon would indeed speak to the media.

A tired-looking Nixon spoke with a quavering voice, delivering what was described as a "15-minute monologue." He spent most of the talk criticizing the press, his remarks interrupted only by brief interjections from reporters, but he acknowledged well into his remarks that the Cuban Missile Crisis in October 1962 did not allow his campaign to get his message across during the final two weeks in his election bid. Nixon began his remarks stating that "now that all the members of the press are so delighted that I have lost, I'd like to make a statement of my own." Nixon insisted that the press had attacked him since 1948 following the Alger Hiss case. He said: "I leave you gentlemen now. And you will now write it. You will interpret it. That's your right. But as I leave you, I want you to know—just think how much you're going to be missing. You don't have Nixon to kick around anymore. Because, gentlemen, this is my last press conference."

He accused the press of printing articles supporting their favored candidates and stated that while they may "give... the shaft" to future candidates, they should have "one lonely reporter on the campaign who will report what the candidate says now and then." Nixon reserved praise for Carl Greenberg of The Los Angeles Times, who he felt "wrote every word I said." Also praised was Edwin Tetlow of The Daily Telegraph of London.

== Aftermath ==
Having seen Nixon's remarks, Brown was quoted as stating, "That's something Nixon's going to regret all his life. The press is never going to let him forget it." As described in his obituary in The New York Times, Nixon's farewell-to-politics speech made him appear to be a sore loser violating a cardinal rule of US politics so that it seemed to indicate "that his political career was over."

Five days after the election, Howard K. Smith hosted a documentary, The Political Obituary of Richard Nixon, broadcast as a half-hour special by ABC as part of its Howard K. Smith: News and Comment series. The panelists were Murray Chotiner and Gerald Ford (one of Nixon's future Vice Presidents and a future United States President himself), who regretted Nixon's departure from politics. Jerry Voorhis, whom Nixon had defeated in a 1946 congressional run, criticized Nixon's tactics in that campaign. Alger Hiss discussed his bitterness at how Nixon had used him to advance his own career at Hiss's expense. While the program was on the air, angry callers clogged the ABC switchboard with complaints, many criticizing the decision to include Hiss, a convicted perjurer, to comment on Nixon. Ultimately, ABC received 80,000 letters and telegrams, almost all of which were critical of the network's special and its choice of panelists.

The partisan nature of Smith's broadcast may well have been the beginning of Nixon's rehabilitation and ascent towards the presidency, with former Governor of New York Thomas E. Dewey, the Republican presidential nominee in 1944 and 1948, writing to Nixon on November 15, "It seems to me that Howard K. Smith has been quite helpful, unwittingly." Noting that many people were outraged by the broadcast, Dewey went on to say that "Smith has proved you were right in your comments about the press".

In his speech at the 1972 Democratic National Convention, George McGovern, who was running against Nixon in that year's presidential election, said:

All of us are going to help him redeem a pledge made ten years ago – that next year you won't have Richard Nixon to kick around anymore.

Nixon never showed any remorse for his remarks, instead feeling that the benefits outweighed any possible repercussions, noting in his memoirs:

I have never regretted what I said in "the last press conference". I believe that it gave the media a warning that I would not sit back and take whatever biased coverage was dished out to me. I think the episode was partially responsible for the much fairer treatment I received from the press during the next few years. From that point of view alone, it was worth it.

== As a political term ==
The "last press conference" has become a generic term for a politician's valedictory address, one in which all possibilities for future political activity are being abandoned. Alternatively, a politician speaking to the press after an electoral loss who does plan to continue in politics may state that it is not a "last press conference".

In an editorial, The New York Times noted Gary Hart's statement following his withdrawal from the 1988 Democratic Party presidential process, in which he stated that he was "angry and defiant" at a system that "reduces the press of this nation to hunter and Presidential candidates to being hunted", likening his remarks to Nixon's "last press conference".

Dan Quayle, effectively conceding defeat to Republican rival George W. Bush in the party's 2000 presidential primaries, noted his relative youth and stated, "I seriously doubt if this will be my last press conference."

== See also ==
- Checkers speech - Another famous address given by Nixon
