= Kern County Board of Supervisors =

Legislative and executive body of Kern County, California

The Kern County Board of Supervisors is the legislative and executive body that governs Kern County, California.

== Modern ==
As of December 2024, the members were:

- 1st District, Phillip Peters.
- 2nd District, Chris Parlier.
- 3rd District, Jeff Flores.
- 4th District, David Couch.
- 5th District, Leticia Perez.

== Historic ==
=== District 1 ===
Established 1866

1. Henry Hammel, 1866–67
2. D.W. Weber, 1868
3. F.W. Craig, 1868–73
4. A.H. Denker, 1873–74
5. F.W. Goodale, 1874–78
6. William Lightner, 1878–80
7. Alvin Fay, 1881–82
8. R.H. Evans, 1883–88
9. Charles F. Bennett, 1889–92, 1913–16
10. C.J.E. Taylor, 1893–1900
11. J.W. Kelly, 1901–02
12. Neils Petersen, 1902–08
13. William Houser, 1909–12
14. F. Rinaldi, 1912
15. C.C. Paxton, 1917–20
16. J.B. McFarland, 1920–28
17. W.R. Woollomes. 1929–48, 1953–64
18. Ardis M. Walker, 1949–52
19. Morton V. Slater, 1964
20. LeRoy M. Jackson, 1965–77
21. Eldon E. (Gene) Tackett, 1977–85
22. Roy Ashburn, 1985–96
23. Jon McQuiston 1997–2012
24. Mick Gleason, 2012–2020
25. Phillip Peters, 2020–present

=== District 2 ===
Established 1866

1. J.J. Rhymes, 1866–69
2. C.T. White, 1870–73
3. Solomon Jewett, 1873–76
4. T.F. Kerr, 1876
5. T.E. Harding, 1876–79
6. A.J. Halbert, 1880–82
7. G.H. Wheeler, 1882
8. J.M. McKamy, 1883–84
9. John M. Brite, 1885
10. L.F. Gates, 1886
11. J. Fontaine, 1888–95
12. Jeremiah Shields, 1895–1902
13. Lucas F. Brite, 1903–18
14. James I. Wagy, 1919–26
15. J. Perry Brite, 1927–34
16. George W. Parish, 1935–38
17. C.W. Harty, 1939–50
18. John W. Holt, 1951–70
19. David A. Head, 1971–82
20. Ben Austin, 1983–94
21. Steve Perez, 1995–2002
22. Don Maben, 2003–10
22. Zack Scrivner, 2011–24
23. Chris Parlier, 2024-present

=== District 3 ===
Established 1866

1. Samuel A. Bishop, 1866
2. J.M. Brite, 1866–73, 1877–80
3. John Narboe, 1877–80
4. P.O. O'Hare, 1880–82
5. L. Crusoe, 1883–84
6. J.M. McKamy, 1885–90
7. E.A. McGee, 1891–94
8. Henry Bohns, 1895–98
9. J.W. Shaffer, 1899–1902
10. A.J. Woody, 1903–10
11. John O. Hart, 1911–18, 1923–34
12. Harry Rambo, 1919–32
13. Jay Hinman, 1934–38
14. Ralph Lavin, 1939–46
15. Leo G. Pauly, 1946
16. Barney L. Barnes, 1947–50
17. Floyd L. Ming, 1951–62
18. David S. Fairbairn, 1963–71
19. Eugene Young, 1971–83
20. Pauline Larwood, 1983–94
21. Barbara Patrick, 1994–2006
22. Mike Maggard, 2007–22
23. Jeff Flores, 2023-present

=== District 4 ===
Established 1884

1. L. Crusoe, 1885–88
2. Alfred Morgan, 1889–92
3. J.W. White, 1893–96
4. T.J. Bottoms, 1897–1903
5. F.H. Corsett, 1903–08
6. J.M. Bush, 1909–16
7. Stanley Abel, 1917–40
8. A.W. Noon, 1941–52
9. Herbert Evans, 1952
10. Vance A. Webb, 1953–77
11. Trice Harvey, 1977–86
12. Karl Hettinger, 1987–92
13. Ken Peterson, 1993–2002
14. Raymond Watson, 2002–12
15. David Couch, 2012–present

=== District 5 ===
Established 1884

1. G.C. Doherty, 1885–97
2. E.M. Roberts, 1887–92
3. Henry Jastro, 1893–1916
4. H.I. Tupman, 1917–20
5. Ira Williams, 1921–28
6. Richard Ashe, 1929–32
7. Charles Wimmer, 1933–44
8. Charles P. Salzer, 1945–50, 1961–69
9. John Hanning, 1951–60
10. Milton Miller, 1969–73
11. John Mitchell, 1973–85
12. Mary K. Shell, 1985–96
13. Pete Parra, 1997–2004
14. Michael J. Rubio, 2005–10
15. Karen Goh, 2010–12
16. Leticia Perez, 2012—present
