= Fruitvale Junior High =

School in California, United States

Coordinates: 35°22′41″N 119°6′33″W

Information
- Established: March 8, 1895; 131 years ago
- Website: fjh.fruitvale.k12.ca.us

Fruitvale Junior High is a junior high school located on the west side of Bakersfield, California, at 2114 Calloway Drive. It is part of the Fruitvale School District. Fruitvale Jr. High has received the Federal Excellence in Education Award in 1990 and was a recipient of the California Distinguished School Award in 1986, 1990, 1994, and 1999. Fruitvale Junior High students are also very active and successful in speech, math, history and science competitions at county, state, and national levels.

== Greenacres Elementary ==
Fruitvale Junior High originally in opened near Coffee Road and Rosedale Highway on March 8, 1895. In 1916, Fruitvale Junior High was moved to 7115 Rosedale Highway. In 1980, Fruitvale Junior High was moved to 2114 Calloway Drive which had been the site of Greenacres Elementary School within the Fruitvale School District since 1960. After the completion of Discovery Elementary School in 1992, Fruitvale Junior High has been the only school located at 2114 Calloway Drive.

== Administration ==
Principal: Erick Rouanzoin Assistant Principal: Michelle Whieldon

== Awards ==
Fruitvale Junior High School has been named a California Distinguished School in 2013 and a Gold Ribbon School in 2017.
