= California Rifle and Pistol Association =

American nonprofit organization

California Rifle & Pistol Association
- Abbreviation: CRPA
- Established: 1875; 151 years ago
- Type: 501(c)(4)
- Headquarters: Fullerton, California
- Region served: California
- President: Chuck Michel
- Main organ: California Firing Line
- Revenue: $2,415,179 (FYE 2020)
- Expenses: $2,771,579 (FYE 2020)
- Website: crpa.org

The California Rifle & Pistol Association (CRPA) is an 501(c)(4) gun rights advocacy group. It provides training in the safe use of firearms, sanctions shooting competitions, and lobbies for pro-firearms and Second Amendment policy in the US state of California.

The CRPA is controlled by an independent board of directors in California. The Association has engaged in litigation challenging anti-gun legislation.

== Subsidiaries ==
The CRPA Foundation is the 501c3 segment of the CRPA family. The CRPA Foundation provides grants and scholarships to groups and students who are involved in the shooting sports and conservation. The CRPA Foundation is a tax-exempt entity and most donations to the Foundation are non-taxable. The Foundation is a 501(c)(3) organization.

The Association's political activities are coordinated through the political action committee, CRPA-PAC which is a separate corporation. The Association employs a full-time lobbyist in the California state capital Sacramento.

== See also ==
- New York State Rifle and Pistol Association
