= 1962 California gubernatorial election =

- November 6, 1962
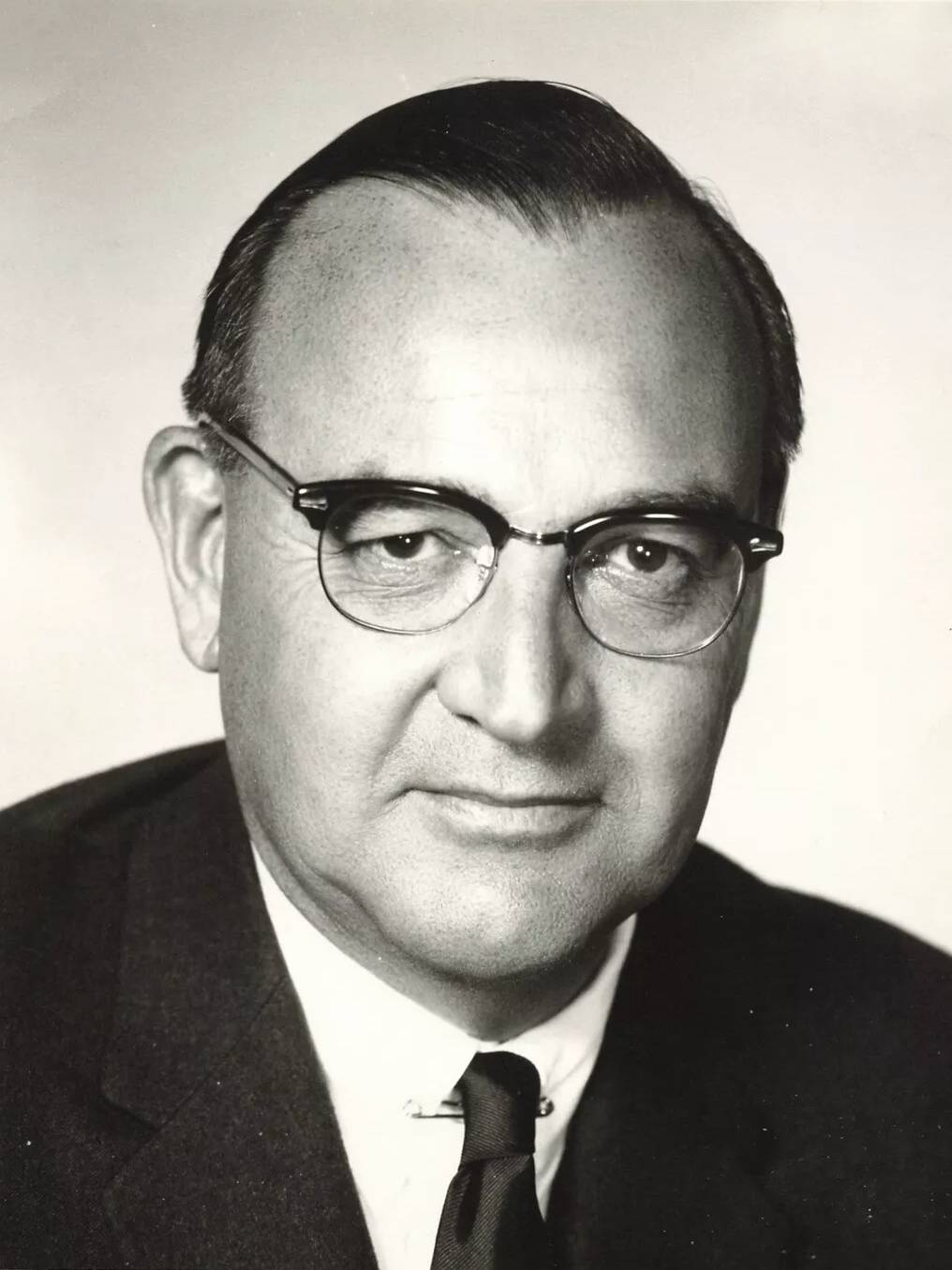

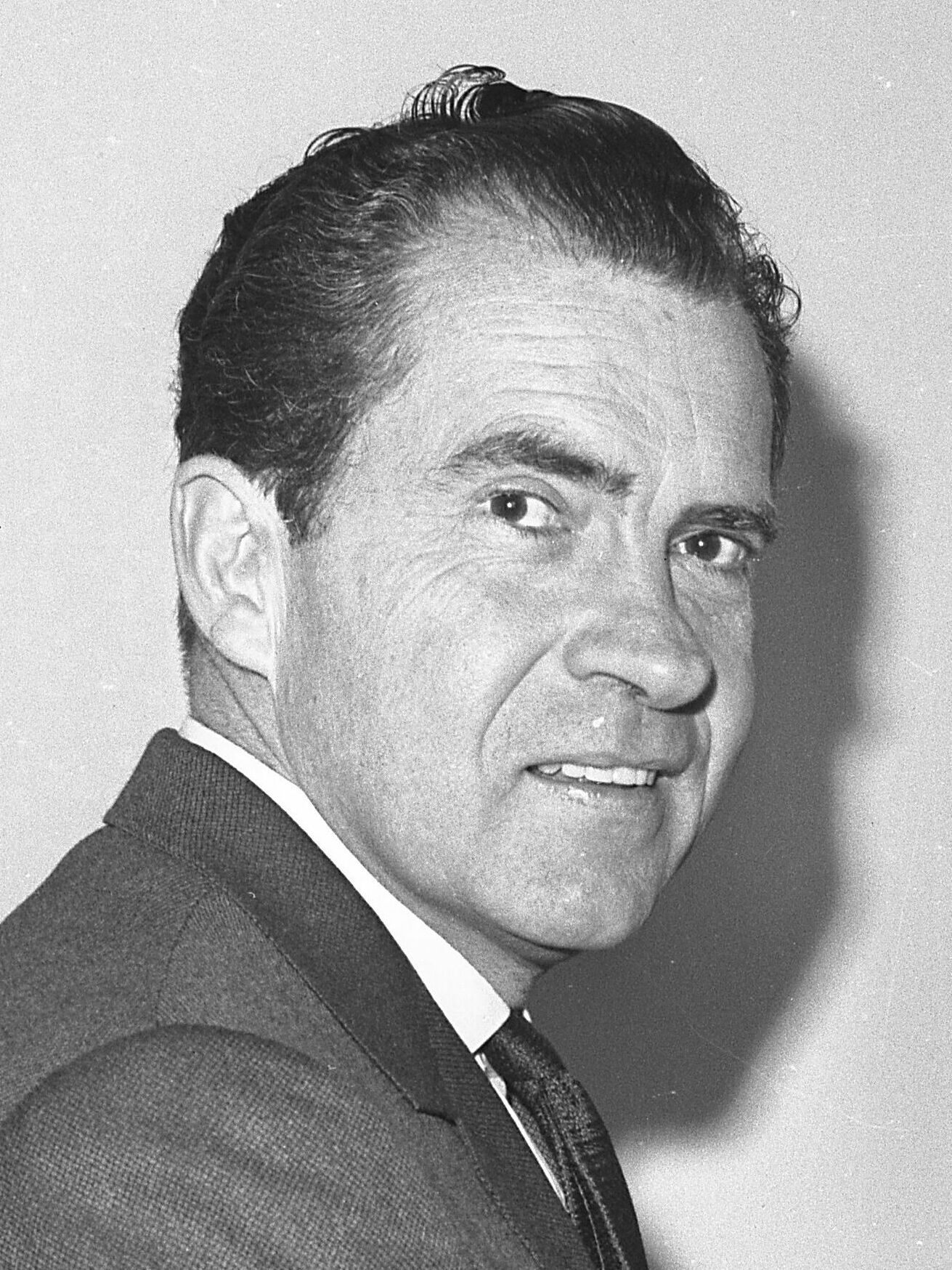
Nominee	Pat Brown	Richard Nixon
Party	Democratic	Republican
Popular vote	3,037,109	2,740,351
Percentage	51.94%	46.87%
- Brown: 40–50% 50–60% 60–70% 80–90% Nixon: 40–50% 50–60% 60–70%
Governor before election
Pat Brown
Democratic
Elected Governor
Pat Brown
Democratic

The 1962 California gubernatorial election was held on November 6, 1962. The Democratic incumbent, Pat Brown, won re-election over former U.S. vice president and 1960 Republican presidential nominee Richard Nixon. Brown became the first Democrat in 109 years to win a second term as Governor of California. In his concession speech the following morning, Nixon accused the media of favoring his opponent Brown, stating that it was his "last press conference" and "You won't have Nixon to kick around any more."

Brown faced nominal opposition throughout the Democratic primary. Emphasizing his record as governor, and following a successful public relations campaign to make Brown appear forceful and decisive, Brown would crush his opponents and won with over 80 percent of the vote.

Nixon was drafted by the California Republican Party in the hopes that it would revitalize his political career following his narrow loss to John F. Kennedy in the 1960 election.

Six years after the election, Nixon was elected President of the United States, and ten years after this press conference, he was re-elected in a landslide.

== Background ==
Pat Brown was a relatively popular Democratic governor in California who was first elected in 1958. However, he was seen as vulnerable due to criticisms of indecision and occasional errors in policy.

In 1958, the Democratic Party had swept all but a single statewide office, and all of the incumbents were seeking reelection in 1962. Despite 1958's near-sweep by Democrats and the state having more registered Democrats than Republicans (4,289,997 registered Democrats on election day 1962 compared to 3,002,038 registered Republicans), at the time, California was generally considered a Republican stronghold, with Republican governors and senators from the end of World War II until the election of Democrat Clair Engle to the Senate in 1958, and Brown's election as governor the same year. The state had voted for Eisenhower in 1952 and 1956, and Nixon carried the state over John F. Kennedy in the 1960 Presidential election.

In 1962, with popular incumbent Senator Thomas Kuchel essentially guaranteed to win re-election, the Republican Party felt it could also gain the governorship and win the state back from the Democrats. They turned to former Vice President Richard Nixon, the biggest name at the time in the California Republican Party. Nixon had a record of winning statewide elections in California, having been elected Senator in 1950, carrying the state twice (in 1952 and 1956) as the vice presidential candidate on the ticket with Dwight D. Eisenhower, and carrying the state against Kennedy in the 1960 presidential election. They also felt a convincing win could be a springboard for Nixon to challenge Kennedy again in 1964, since he narrowly lost to him in 1960.

Primary elections were held on June 5, 1962.

== Democratic primary ==
=== Candidates ===
- Edmund G. "Pat" Brown, incumbent Governor of California
- Alfred L. Hamilton, state parole agent
- Phillip Moore, public relations man
- John C. Stuart, cost analyst

=== Campaign ===
Brown, a relatively popular incumbent, faced no serious opposition in the Democratic Party primary. In whole, the Democratic primaries for statewide offices showed a lack of strong division in the party, with the exception of William McKesson's unsuccessful challenge to incumbent Glenn M. Anderson in the race for the Democratic nomination for lieutenant governor.

Brown was endorsed by the liberal California Democratic Council, which put him on their slate of endorsed candidates at their convention, held January 26–28, 1962 in Fresno. Brown's camp made an effort of ensuring that none of the resolutions the council passed at their convention would provide fodder that a Republican general election opponent could use to embarrass Brown.

Brown's camp emphasized the accomplishments of Brown's legislative record, including programs related to water and education. Public relations consultants played a role in reshaping Brown's image as a forceful and decisive leader.

=== Results ===
Democratic primary results
Party	Candidate	Votes	%
Democratic	Edmund G. "Pat" Brown (incumbent)	1,739,792	81.42%
Democratic	John C. Stuart	103,654	4.85%
Democratic	Phillip Moore	100,237	4.69%
Democratic	Alfred L. Hamilton	90,472	4.23%
Republican	Joseph C. Shell (write-in)	66,712	3.12%
Republican	Richard M. Nixon (write-in)	35,883	1.68%
Total votes		2,136,750	100.00%

== Republican primary ==
=== Candidates ===
- William Potter Gale, perennial candidate
- Richard Nixon, former U.S. Senator (1950–1953), former Vice President of the United States (1953–1961), and Republican nominee for president of the United States in 1960
- Joseph C. Shell, minority leader of the California State Assembly

=== Withdrew ===
- Goodwin Knight, former governor of California (withdrew January 16, 1962)
- Harold J. Powers, former lieutenant governor of California (withdrew March 1962)

=== Campaign ===
Nixon announced his candidacy for governor on September 27, 1961, roughly eleven months after losing the 1960 presidential election. His bid was largely seen as a step towards either a 1964 or 1968 presidential campaign. Nixon's 1962 campaign was managed by H. R. Haldeman.

On January 16, 1962, former governor Goodie Knight was forced to withdraw his campaign for the nomination after suffering a serious case of hepatitis. Knight had been a popular governor, and his withdrawal was beneficial to Nixon's prospects of capturing the nomination. In the first week of March 1962, former lieutenant governor Harold J. Powers withdrew from the primary, due to lack of organizational and financial campaign for his candidacy. This left Nixon facing only the conservative California State Assembly minority leader Joseph C. Shell in the primary. Shell was a wealthy man, having earned his fortune in oil, and was seen as a militant leader of conservative faction of the Republican Party. Shell received support from the John Birch Society, who he had advocated welcoming within the party.

Democrats took a hands-off approach to dealing with the Republican primary, letting Nixon and Shell duke it out between themselves without Democratic engagement. Nixon had wanted to hold a series of debates with Brown during the primary campaign season, but Brown did not engage in such debates with Nixon.

Shell hoped to win the support of conservative Republicans, and hoped that there would be lower Republican primary turnout that would lead to the participating electorate having a significantly conservative lean. In announcing his candidacy, Shell had claimed to be seeking the support of voters that supported,

A commitment to individual liberty limited only by those powers clearly enumerated in our constitution without reducing our ability to develop private property and free individual enterprise.

In terms of party leadership support, Nixon had far more support from the California Republican Party's state central executive committee than Shell did. However, a fight emerged between Nixon and Shell backers in gaining organizational power at the county and precinct level organizations of the party.

Nixon, on February 17, 1962, declared that he would not seek the endorsement of the California Republican Assembly (CRA). This was possibly due to the fact that he had previously, in his 1950 U.S. Senate primary, lost the endorsement of a subcommittee of the organization, and he perhaps was reluctant to seek support from the organization again. On February 17, 1962, Nixon declared that he would not, himself, provide backing to any candidate involved with the John Birch Society, remarking that he had, "no commitment to endorse any candidate who seeks or accepts the support of the John Birch Society, even if they were the Republican Party nominees. Nixon quickly recanted his decision not to seek the endorsement of the CRA, and decided to indicate that he would seek their nomination and would additionally propose a resolution at their convention which would renounce the John Birch Society.

Nixon beat Shell for support of the subcommittee of the CRA's fact-finding committee by a 7–5 vote. He again beat Shell for the support of the full fact-finding committee's support in a 34–25 vote. In the floor vote of the CRA convention, Nixon beat Shell for the CRA's endorsement in a 263–176 vote. Additionally, at the convention, Nixon saw a supporter of his, former Kansas governor Fred Hall, elected as the CRA's president. At the convention, Nixon sponsored a resolution to repudiate the John Birch Society's president Robert W. Welch Jr. and urging members of the CRA to abandon the John Birch Society if they were members of it. A contentious floor fight took place over the proposed resolution, with conservatives opposing it. A compromise was reached to adopt the portion condemning Welch but to not adopt the portion urging CRA members to abandon membership in the John Birch Society. Any association with the John Birch Society seemed politically unhelpful to Nixon in a general election, so this resolution was seen by him and his campaign as helping set him up for greater chances of victory in a general election.

Shell traveled extensively during his campaign by utilizing his own private plane. His campaign had decent financing and was effectively organized. A key argument he made in support of his candidacy was that the state's economy was threatened due to assailing spending by the Brown gubernatorial administration. He also attacked Brown's governance by alleging increased federal government influence over the state. Another key argument he made in support of his candidacy was that Nixon would be unable to beat Brown in a general election, arguing that Democratic-leaning voters would "solidify" against Nixon. Shell also levied accusations that either Nixon or supporters of Nixon's had resorted to "gutter tactics" by "whispering lies" about Shell's family. Shell also called into question Nixon's expertise on state government and challenged Nixon to televised debates.

Nixon campaigned across the state, often addressing sizable and curious crowds. Nixon ignored attacks from Shell in hopes not to ward off conservative support in the general election. Nixon's speeches dealt with subjects such as states' rights, reforms to taxes and budgets, addressing crime, and government efficiency. It had been over a decade since Nixon had run for state office and he made a number of embarrassing political slip-ups that made him appear under-prepared, such as referring to the California State Capitol as the "state house". It was also used against Nixon that he was made to admit that he had made a factual error in his book Six Crises regarding its account of the case of Alger Hiss.

=== Results ===
Republican primary results
Party	Candidate	Votes	%
Republican	Richard M. Nixon	1,285,151	65.43%
Republican	Joseph C. Shell	656,542	33.42%
Republican	William Potter Gale	17,369	0.88%
Democratic	Edmund G. "Pat" Brown (write-in)	5,236	0.27%
Total votes		1,964,298	100.00%

Although Nixon beat Shell in the primary, 1,285,151 votes (65.4 percent) to Shell's 656,542 (33.4 percent), the contest was bitter, and Nixon did not reach out to conservative Shell supporters, which weakened him in the general election.

== Prohibition primary ==
=== Candidates ===
- Robert L. Wyckoff, physician and attorney, Prohibition Party state chairman

=== Results ===
Prohibition primary results
Party	Candidate	Votes	%
Prohibition	Robert L. Wyckoff	1,944	100.00%
Total votes		1,944	100.00%

== General election ==
=== Campaign ===
In a bitter and expensive campaign, Brown and Nixon campaigned with great zeal and effort. During the campaign, Nixon accused Brown of being weak on communism and crime. Brown alleged that Nixon was only interested in holding the governorship in order to utilize it as a stepping stone to the presidency. Nixon's wife Pat campaigned with him.

Two weeks after the Republican primary, Shell endorsed Nixon's candidacy. Shell had conditioned an endorsement of Nixon on Nixon agreeing to make $200 million in cuts to the state budget and giving conservatives a share of the California delegates to the 1964 Republican National Convention.

Harold J. Powers, who had dropped out of the Republican primary, endorsed Brown in the general election.

Earl Warren, a Republican serving as Chief Justice of the United States and former governor of California, had long had a political feud with Nixon, despite Nixon and Warren being from the same state and the same party. Warren posed for photos with Brown, and told the press what a great job Brown was doing. Warren also had his son, Earl Jr., stump across the state for Brown and against Nixon.

Nixon had a lead in the polls early on, but Brown lessened the margin as time went on, and pre-election polls showed Brown winning.

=== Results ===
1962 California gubernatorial election
Party	Candidate	Votes	%	±%
Democratic	Edmund G. "Pat" Brown (incumbent)	3,037,109	51.89%	−7.86%
Republican	Richard M. Nixon	2,740,351	46.82%	+6.65%
Prohibition	Robert L. Wyckoff	69,700	1.19%	
Independent	Joseph C. Shell (write-in)	3,166	0.05%	
Independent	Herbert Steiner (write-in)	448	0.01%	
Independent	R. C. Irvine (write-in)	159	0.00%	
	Scattering	2,299	0.04%	
Total votes		5,853,232	100.00%	
Turnout			57.50%	
Democratic hold		Swing	-14.51%	

==== Results by county ====
Pat Brown is the last Democrat to date to have carried Colusa County and Modoc County. Additionally, El Dorado County has backed a Democratic gubernatorial candidate only once since this election, in 1978.

County	Edmund G. Brown Democratic		Richard M. Nixon Republican		Robert L. Wyckoff Prohibition		Scattering (Note: The write-in votes for Shell, Steiner, and Irvine were not separated out by county) Write-in		Margin		Total votes cast
County	#	%	#	%	#	%	#	%	#	%	Total votes cast
Alameda	206,861	57.98%	145,851	40.88%	3,717	1.04%	321	0.09%	61,010	17.10%	356,750
Alpine	67	34.72%	122	63.21%	3	1.55%	1	0.52%	-55	-28.50%	193
Amador	2,811	58.16%	1,941	40.16%	71	1.47%	10	0.21%	870	18.00%	4,833
Butte	16,142	47.74%	17,172	50.79%	443	1.31%	54	0.16%	-1,030	-3.05%	33,811
Calaveras	2,379	46.37%	2,655	51.75%	92	1.79%	4	0.08%	-276	-5.38%	5,130
Colusa	2,320	52.06%	2,056	46.14%	77	1.73%	3	0.07%	264	5.92%	4,456
Contra Costa	91,150	55.49%	71,192	43.34%	1,811	1.10%	124	0.08%	19,958	12.15%	164,277
Del Norte	2,741	51.97%	2,418	45.85%	112	2.12%	3	0.06%	323	6.12%	5,274
El Dorado	6,572	56.25%	4,842	41.44%	242	2.07%	27	0.23%	1,730	14.81%	11,683
Fresno	68,187	57.78%	48,211	40.85%	1,479	1.25%	136	0.12%	19,976	16.93%	118,013
Glenn	3,299	48.70%	3,353	49.50%	116	1.71%	6	0.09%	-54	-0.80%	6,774
Humboldt	17,739	52.19%	15,708	46.22%	511	1.50%	29	0.09%	2,031	5.98%	33,987
Imperial	8,241	44.14%	10,271	55.01%	142	0.76%	16	0.09%	-2,030	-10.87%	18,670
Inyo	2,526	47.00%	2,740	50.99%	100	1.86%	8	0.15%	-214	-3.98%	5,374
Kern	48,737	52.10%	43,342	46.33%	1,376	1.47%	95	0.10%	5,395	5.77%	93,550
Kings	9,141	59.03%	6,113	39.48%	217	1.40%	14	0.09%	3,028	19.55%	15,485
Lake	3,315	44.42%	4,041	54.15%	105	1.41%	2	0.03%	-726	-9.73%	7,463
Lassen	3,500	62.50%	1,968	35.14%	121	2.13%	11	0.20%	1,352	27.36%	5,600
Los Angeles	1,191,724	51.83%	1,080,113	46.98%	24,986	1.09%	2,421	0.11%	111,611	4.85%	2,299,244
Madera	7,728	60.46%	4,903	38.36%	141	1.10%	11	0.09%	2,825	22.10%	12,783
Marin	27,664	45.38%	32,720	53.67%	503	0.83%	79	0.13%	-5,056	-8.29%	60,966
Mariposa	1,272	47.50%	1,349	50.37%	53	1.98%	4	0.15%	-77	-2.88%	2.678
Mendocino	8,704	51.50%	7,936	46.96%	249	1.47%	12	0.07%	768	4.54%	16,901
Merced	14,105	57.62%	10,071	41.14%	268	1.09%	34	0.14%	4,034	16.48%	24,478
Modoc	1,641	51.73%	1,473	46.44%	52	1.64%	6	0.19%	168	5.30%	3,172
Mono	488	36.12%	840	62.18%	23	1.70%	0	0.00%	-352	-26.05%	1,351
Monterey	24,801	46.52%	28,000	52.52%	476	0.89%	36	0.07%	-3,199	-6.00%	53,313
Napa	14,748	53.50%	12,326	44.72%	469	1.70%	21	0.08%	2,422	8.79%	27,654
Nevada	4,818	51.02%	4,450	47.12%	143	1.51%	32	0.34%	368	3.90%	9,443
Orange	112,152	39.16%	169,962	59.35%	3,832	1.34%	431	0.15%	-57,810	-20.19%	286,377
Placer	13,592	59.98%	8,677	38.29%	366	1.62%	24	0.11%	4,915	21.69%	22,659
Plumas	3,397	66.44%	1,624	31.76%	88	1.72%	4	0.08%	1,773	34.68%	5,113
Riverside	50,257	46.60%	55,926	51.86%	1,595	1.48%	71	0.07%	-5,669	-5.26%	107,849
Sacramento	115,462	60.69%	71,788	37.74%	2,542	1.34%	446	0.23%	43,674	22.96%	190,238
San Benito	2,527	48.30%	2,640	50.46%	64	1.22%	1	0.02%	-113	-2.16%	5,232
San Bernardino	88,437	51.68%	80,054	46.78%	2,501	1.46%	133	0.08%	8,383	4.90%	171,125
San Diego	153,389	42.40%	201,969	55.83%	6,101	1.69%	315	0.09%	-48,580	-13.43%	361,774
San Francisco	180,298	62.19%	107,165	36.96%	2,298	0.79%	157	0.05%	73,133	25.23%	289,918
San Joaquin	43,276	49.40%	43,147	49.25%	1,095	1.25%	83	0.09%	129	0.15%	87,601
San Luis Obispo	16,110	52.86%	13,825	45.36%	528	1.73%	15	0.05%	2,285	7.50%	30,478
San Mateo	90,464	51.88%	82,115	47.09%	1,670	0.96%	127	0.07%	8,349	4.79%	174,376
Santa Barbara	30,424	47.50%	32,821	51.24%	775	1.21%	32	0.05%	-2,397	-3.74%	64,052
Santa Clara	121,149	51.20%	112,700	47.63%	2,538	1.07%	245	0.10%	8,449	3.57%	236,632
Santa Cruz	17,354	44.93%	20,580	53.28%	656	1.70%	34	0.09%	-3,226	-8.35%	38,624
Shasta	14,753	63.97%	7,858	34.07%	378	1.64%	75	0.33%	6,895	29.90%	23,064
Sierra	676	57.98%	461	39.54%	29	2.49%	0	0.00%	215	18.44%	1,166
Siskiyou	7,718	59.98%	4,942	38.41%	190	1.48%	18	0.14%	2,776	21.57%	12,868
Solano	25,987	64.31%	13,888	34.37%	513	1.27%	19	0.05%	12,099	29.94%	40,407
Sonoma	29,373	49.19%	29,647	49.65%	643	1.08%	53	0.09%	-274	-0.46%	59,716
Stanislaus	30,431	53.64%	25,417	44.80%	789	1.39%	99	0.17%	5,014	8.84%	56,736
Sutter	4,816	41.19%	6,734	57.59%	142	1.21%	0	0.00%	-1,918	-16.40%	11,692
Tehama	5,077	51.36%	4,591	46.44%	200	2.02%	18	0.18%	486	4.92%	9,886
Trinity	2,201	64.58%	1,148	33.69%	53	1.56%	6	0.18%	1,053	30.90%	3,408
Tulare	24,598	49.08%	24,914	49.71%	584	1.17%	24	0.05%	-316	-0.63%	50,120
Tuolumne	3,631	52.48%	3,187	46.06%	94	1.36%	7	0.10%	444	6.42%	6,919
Ventura	37,777	53.46%	31,899	45.15%	914	1.29%	68	0.10%	5,878	8.32%	70,658
Yolo	13,334	60.67%	8,311	37.82%	293	1.33%	39	0.18%	5,023	22.86%	21,977
Yuba	5,028	53.77%	4,184	44.74%	131	1.40%	8	0.09%	844	9.03%	9,351
Total	3,037,109	51.89%	2,740,351	46.82%	69,700	1.19%	6,072	0.10%	296,758	5.07%	5,853,232

==== Counties that flipped from Democratic to Republican ====
- Butte
- Calaveras
- Glenn
- Imperial
- Kern
- Lake
- Marin
- Mariposa
- Monterey
- Riverside
- San Benito
- San Diego
- Santa Cruz
- Sonoma
- Sutter
- Tulare

== Aftermath ==
Brown won by a 5% margin. The day after the results were announced, a stunned and frustrated Nixon announced he was retiring from politics. He famously stated, "Just think how much you're going to be missing. You won't have Nixon to kick around anymore". The speech increased sympathy for Nixon among the public, but was also viewed at the time as the end of his political career. Brown told President Kennedy that, "I don't see how he can ever recover", a view that Kennedy shared.

Brown was the first Democratic Party governor reelected in California since 1853, and only the third governor of any party reelected since California extended gubernatorial terms to four-years in 1862 (after only Hiram Johnson and Earl Warren). In the coinciding California State Legislature elections, the Democratic Party retained control of the State Legislature, marking the first time in the 20th century that the Democratic Party would hold control of the state's legislature for longer than a four-year period. The party won 53.9% of the cumulative popular vote in the State Legislature elections. In the coinciding United States House of Representatives elections in the state, Democrats gained nine seats, while Republicans lost one (the state had gained eight new seats in reapportionment after the 1960 United States census), and won 51.8% of the state's cumulative votes in its congressional races. All of the state's incumbent congressmen sought reelection, with three Republican incumbents and one Democratic incumbent losing reelection. The Democrats won seven of the eight newly created congressional seats, while Republicans won one. Republican Senator Thomas Kuchel won reelection as expected in the coinciding United States Senate election, capturing an overwhelming share of the vote in that election.

Brown served out his second term, but failed to win a third term in 1966, losing reelection to future president Ronald Reagan.

Nixon later re-entered politics when he ran for president again in 1968; he won that election, and was later re-elected, but he resigned in disgrace in 1974 due to the Watergate scandal.

== Statistics ==
- Compiled by Frank M. Jordan, Secretary of State (1962). State of California. Statement of Vote. Consolidated Direct Primary Election and Special Statewide Election June 5, 1962.
- Compiled by Frank M. Jordan, Secretary of State (1962). Statement of Vote for November 6, 1962 General Election.
- Gubernatorial Elections, 1787-1997. Washington, D.C.: Congressional Quarterly Inc. 1998. ISBN 1-56802-396-0.
- Scammon, Richard M., ed. (1964). America Votes 5: a handbook of contemporary American election statistics, 1962. Washington, D.C.: Governmental Affairs Institute.
