= Calloway Canal =

Irrigation canal in Kern County, California, US

Coordinates: 35°30′51″N 119°14′27″W

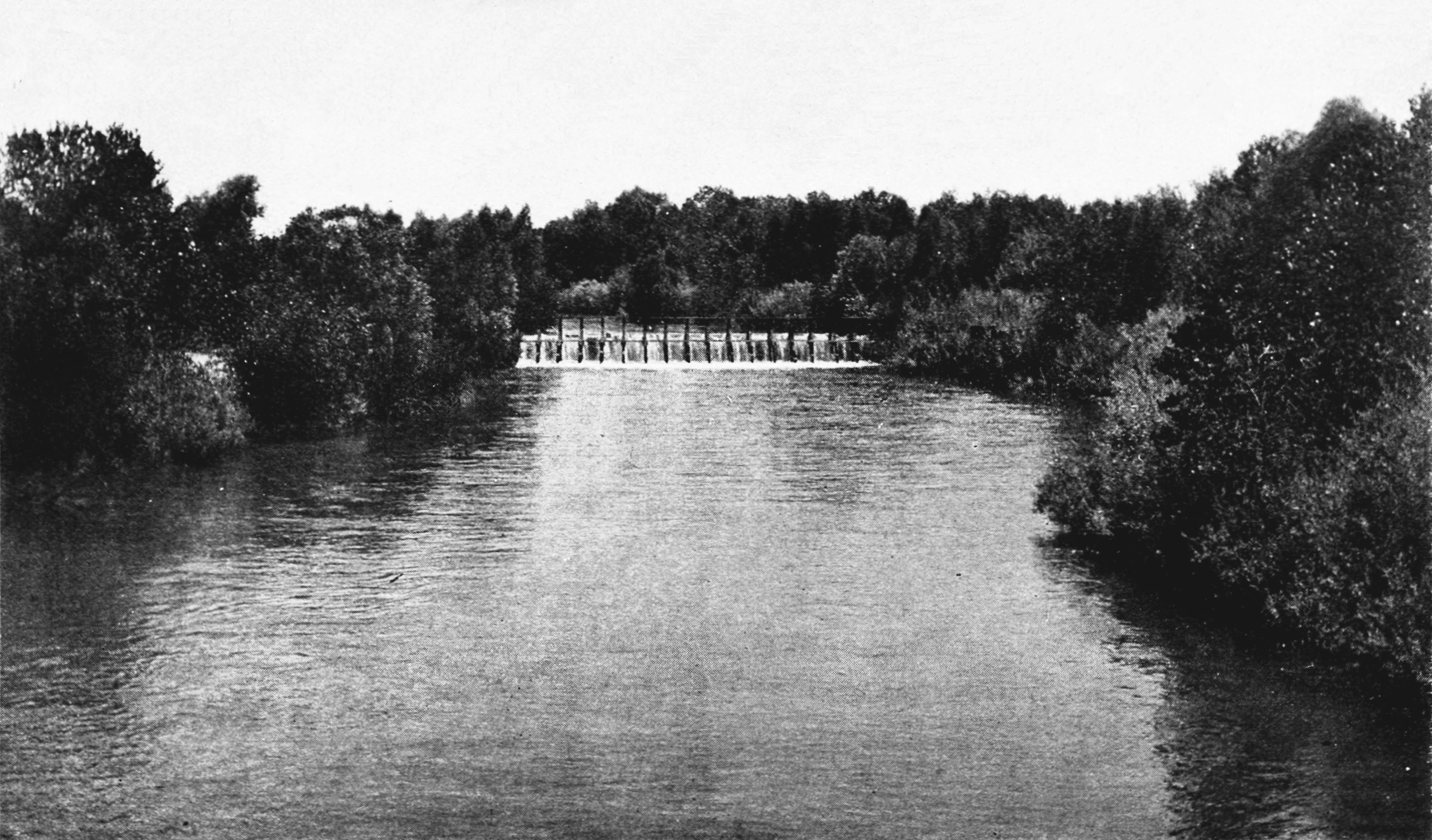
View of Calloway Canal (circa 1894).

Calloway Canal is an irrigation canal owned by the North Kern Water Storage District in Kern County, California. It originates from the Kern River, just east of Golden State Highway (SR 204 freeway) in Bakersfield. It terminates at reservoirs located south of Whisler Road and east of SR 99 (Golden State Freeway), near McFarland.

From the diversion, the canal travels west, around industrial development before turning southwest. After crossing Rosedale Highway (SR 58), the canal makes a 120 degree turn, traveling northwest. It again crosses Rosedale Highway and then crosses the Friant-Kern Canal. The two canals run parallel to each other, traveling northwest. Although the canals run about 100 feet (30 m) apart, water flows in opposite directions. While the Calloway Canal is flowing northwest, the Friant-Kern Canal is flowing southeast. At Snow Road, the distance between the canals increases, although the two still run roughly parallel. The Calloway Canal terminates at reservoirs near McFarland.

The construction of the Calloway Canal led to the water war between Henry Miller/Charles Lux and James Haggin/Lloyd Tevis (see Lux_v._Haggin). The result was the Haggin-Miller Water Agreement of 1888, in which a certain percentage of Kern River water was guaranteed to Miller/Lux.
