= Southwest Bakersfield =

- Region in Bakersfield
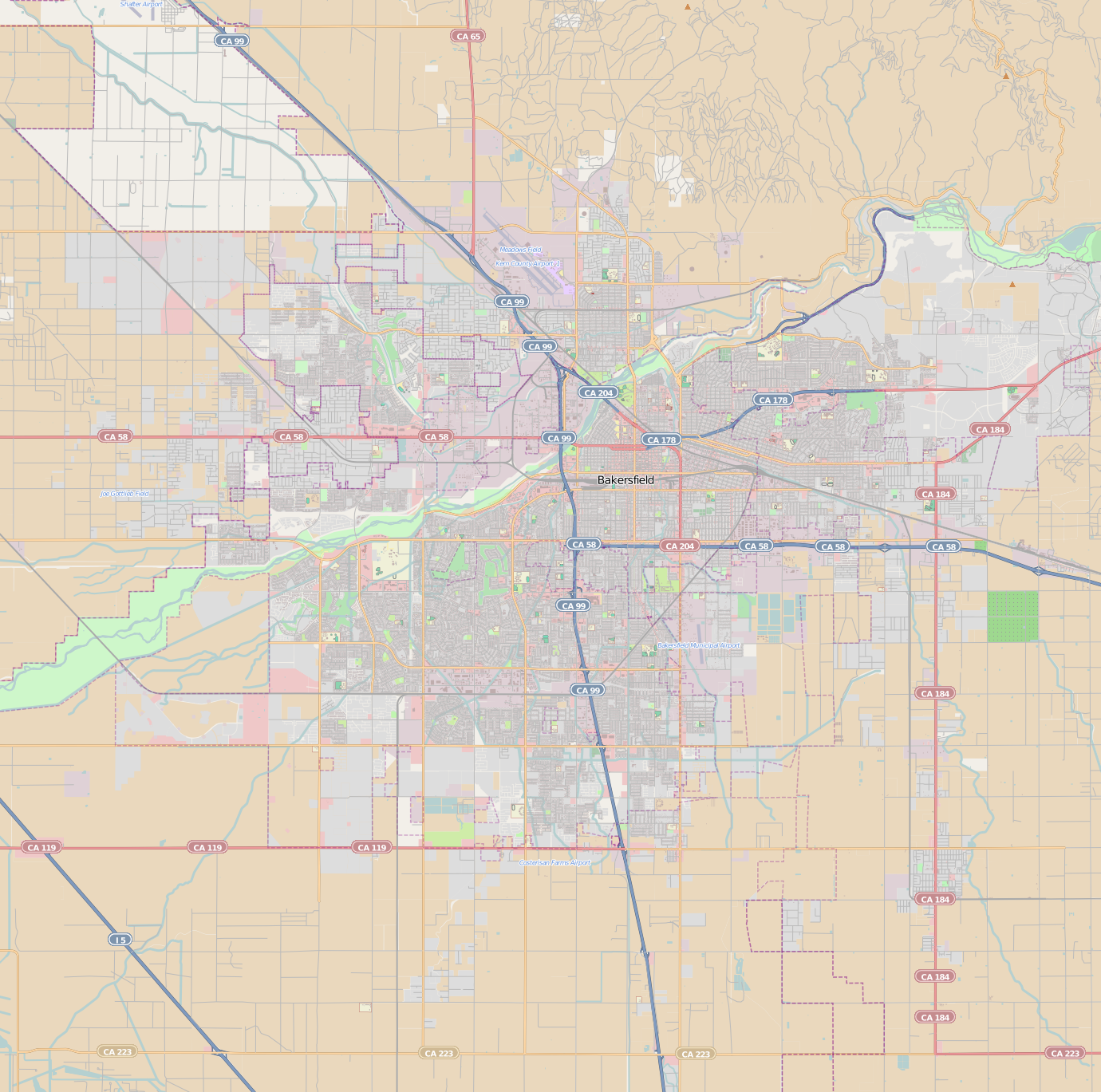
- Location within Bakersfield
- Coordinates: 35°19′5″N 119°5′31″W
- Country: United States
- State: California
- County: County of Kern
- City: City of Bakersfield
- Neighborhoods and Subdistricts: List: Financial District; Seven Oaks; Stockdale

Area
  - Total: 20.26 sq mi (52.5 km^{2})
- Includes area planned for future development.
- ZIP Code: 93309, 93311, 93313, 93314
- Area Code: 661

Southwest Bakersfield (commonly referred to simply as The Southwest) is the southwest region of Bakersfield, California. It is roughly bounded by the Kern River to the north and Oak Street/Wible Road to the east. The other boundaries are the city limits themselves.

The Southwest contains major residential, commercial, and industrial sectors, as well as parks, shopping districts, and a four-year university.

Most of the land that makes up the region was originally owned by the Kern County Land Company. That company later became Tenneco West and is currently known as Castle and Cooke. Growth started in the early 1950s but accelerated by the 1960s. Most of the growth in Bakersfield between the 1960s and 1980s occurred in the southwest. In recent years, development in other regions has slowed the growth in the southwest.

== Neighborhoods and Districts ==
Like other regions in Bakersfield, most districts and neighborhood boundaries in the Southwest vary depending on who a person talks to. Below are some of the more commonly used neighborhood names.

=== Financial District ===
Centered around California Avenue and Mohawk Street is Bakersfield's Financial District. It is the location for many of the regional offices and corporate headquarters for companies that have assets in the county, and surrounding region. These include Wells Fargo, Bank of the West, and Berry Petroleum. It is also home to Stockdale Towers, the tallest building in the city. Chevron, Occidental Petroleum, and other companies were also located there, but have since moved to larger buildings farther to the southwest.

The Financial District is located on the actively producing Fruitvale Oil Field. Oil well pumping units are scattered throughout the district, mainly in the parking lots. The units are fenced and landscaped. Some of the tanks for storing the pumped oil are located just east of the intersection of Truxtun Avenue and Mohawk Street.

=== Seven Oaks ===
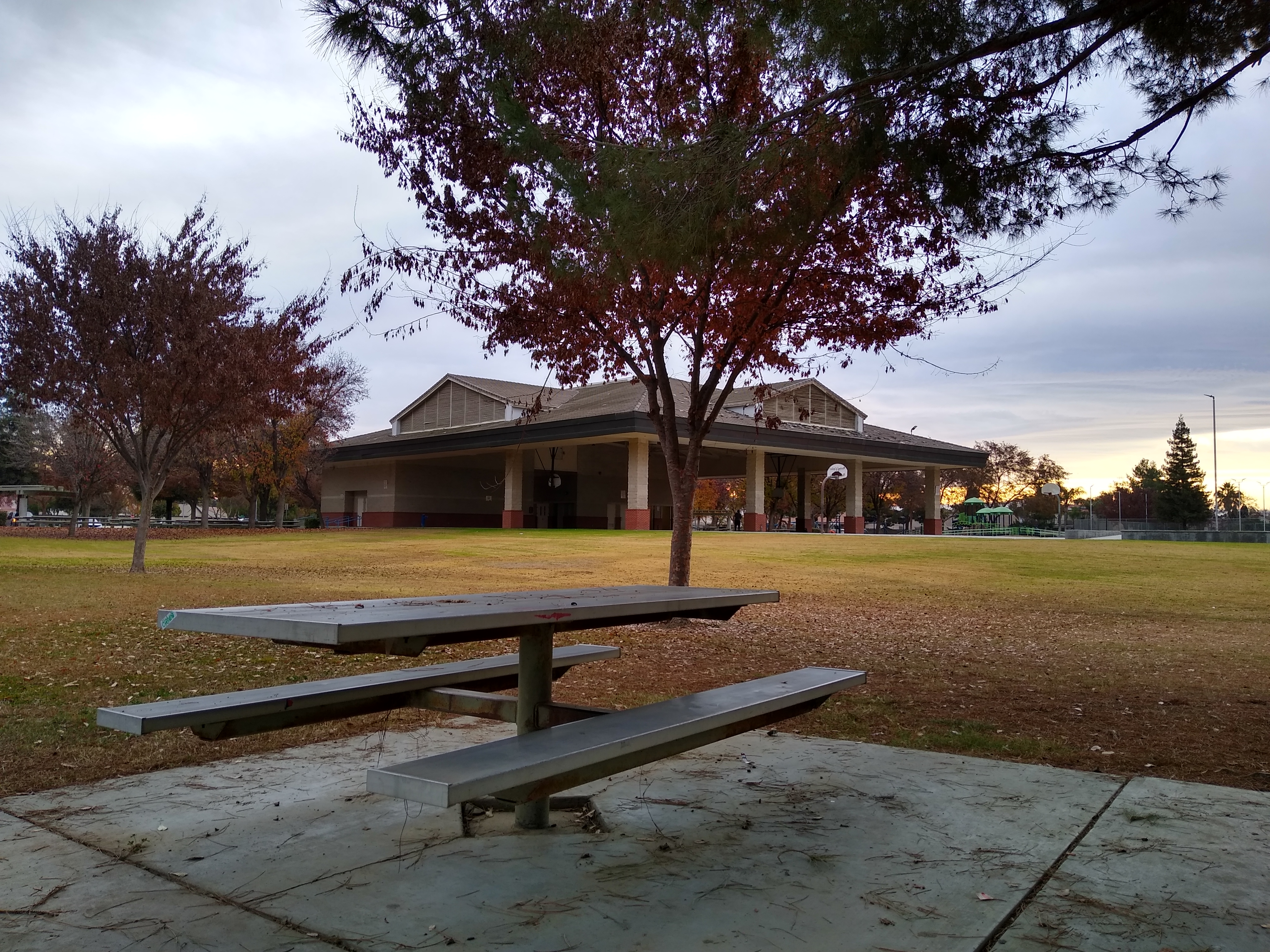
Silver Creek Park in the Silver Creek community

Seven Oaks is a mixture of residential and commercial space. It is roughly bordered to the north by Stockdale Highway and to the east by Gosford Road. The other boundaries are the city limits. Some of the housing communities in this area are Seven Oaks, Haggin Oaks, Southern Oaks, The Oaks, Campus Park, Laurelglen, The Vineyards, Silver Creek, Stone Creek, and Grand Island. Like Stockdale, it also contains a private country club (named the Seven Oaks Country Club). It also contains The Marketplace, a major retail center. California State University, Bakersfield is also located in Seven Oaks.

A major commercial and retail sector is River Walk. Located along Stockdale Highway, between the Kern River and Calloway Drive, it is a mixture of commercial and retail shopping. The centerpiece to the development is The Park at River Walk, which contains two artificial lakes and a meandering stream. It is also home to the Bright House Amphitheater.

There is also a mini corporate center on Old River Road between the Kern River and Ming Avenue, although some of the buildings are also located on adjacent streets. Many companies in Bakersfield that need large office space are located there. Because land there is inexpensive, buildings' profiles tend to be short and wide, rather than high-rise.

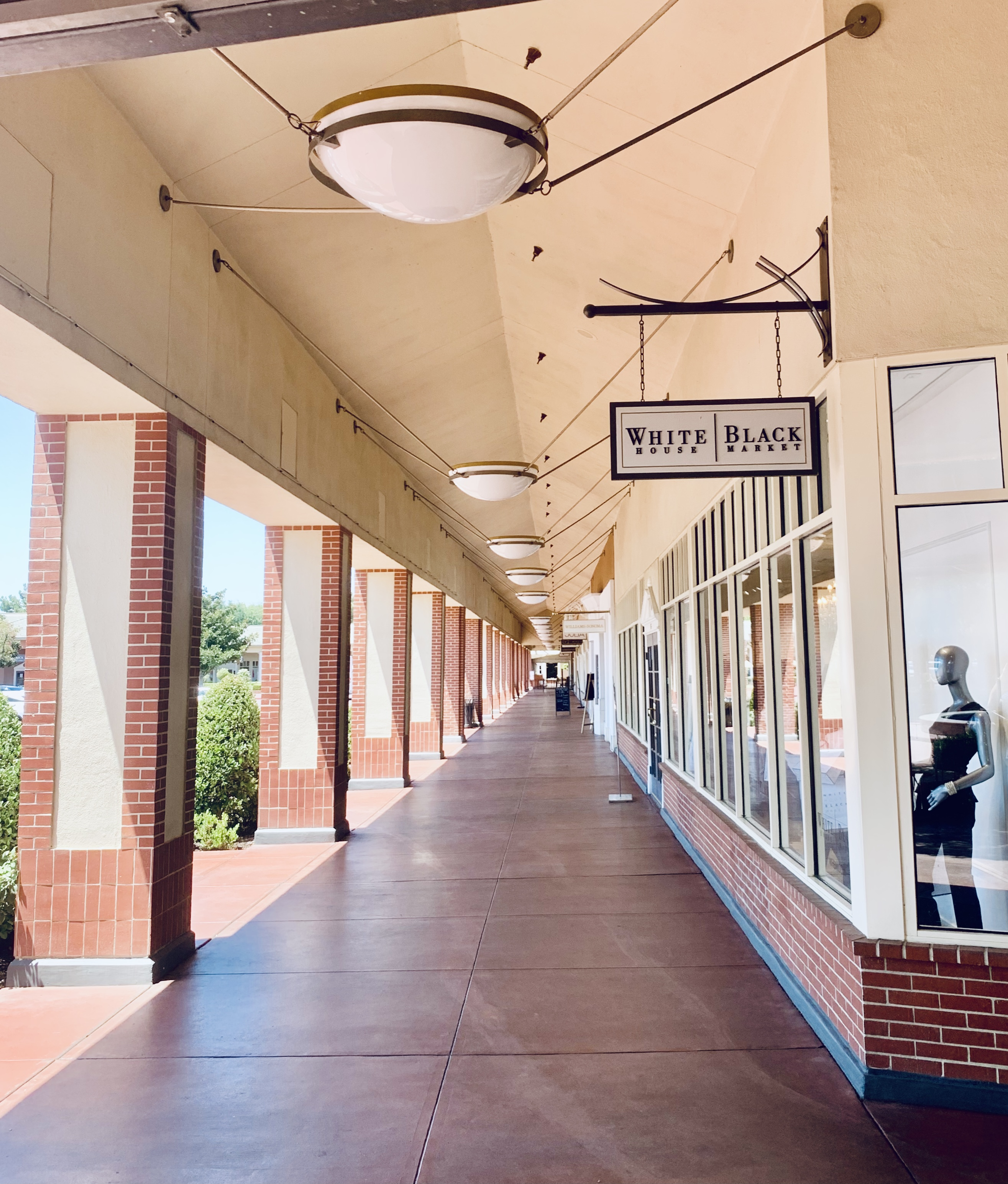
Corridor of shops at The Marketplace in Seven Oaks

=== Stockdale ===
Stockdale is a mostly residential neighborhood. Starting north and traveling clockwise, it is bounded by the Kern River, California Avenue/New Stine Road, Ming Avenue, and Gosford Road. The historic Stockdale Country Club, which was founded in 1925, is located there. Named neighborhoods include: Stockdale Country Club ("Old Stockdale"), Stockdale Country Club Estates ("Stockdale Estates"), Amberton, Westwood, Laurelglen, Los Portales, Quailwood, and Park Stockdale.

Major shopping centers include Stockdale Village and Stockdale Fashion Plaza, both centered on the intersection of California Avenue/New Stine Road and Stockdale Highway.

== See also ==
- Bakersfield, California
