= Northwest Bakersfield =

- Region in Bakersfield
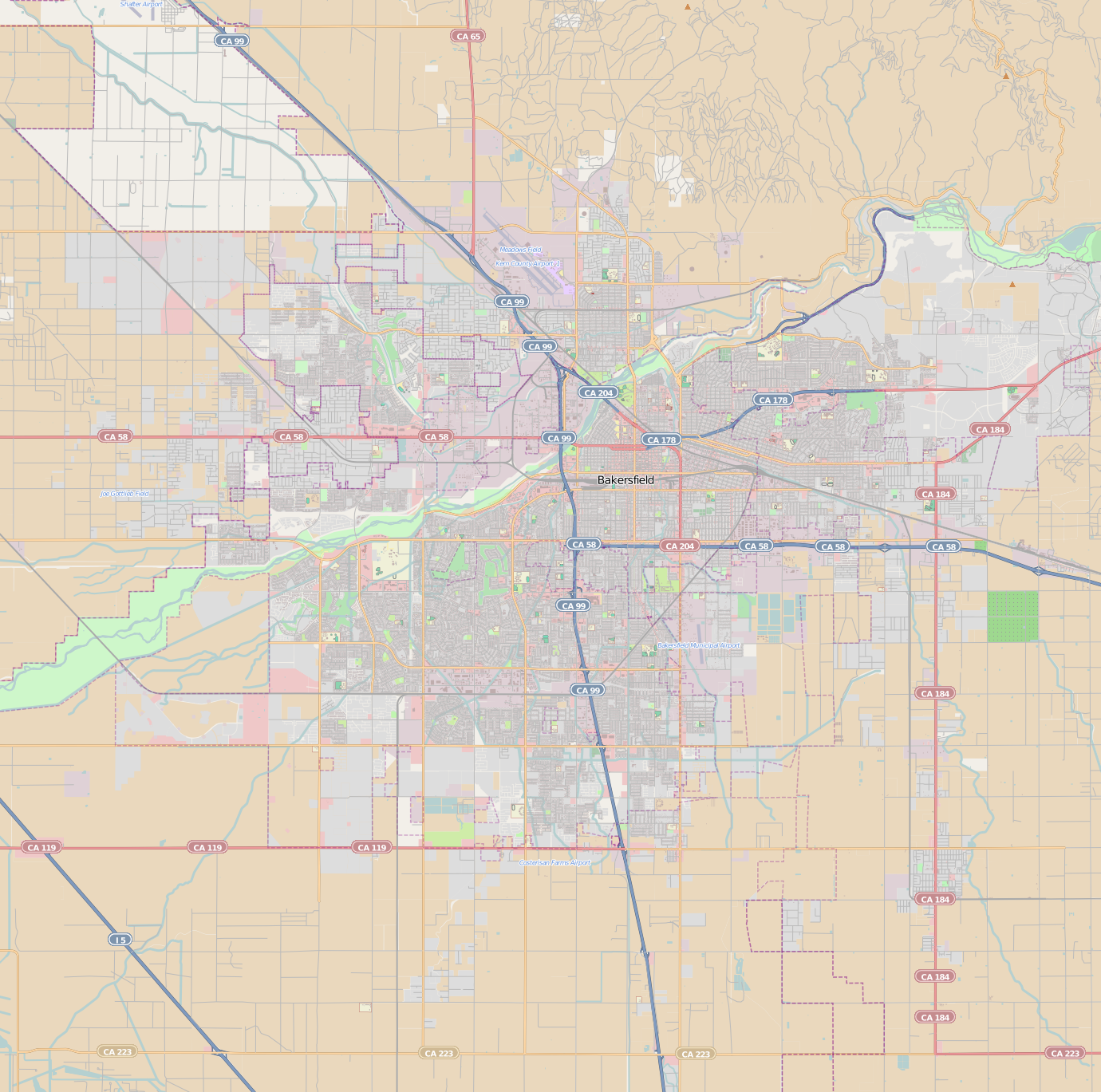
- Location within Bakersfield
- Coordinates: 35°24′0″N 119°6′14″W
- Country: United States
- State: California
- County: County of Kern
- City: City of Bakersfield
- Neighborhoods of Northwest: List: Bakersfield Commons; Riverlakes Ranch

Area
  - Total: 28.14 sq mi (72.9 km^{2})
- Includes area scheduled for future development.
- ZIP Code: 93308, 93312, 93314
- Area Code: 661

Northwest Bakersfield (commonly referred to simply as The Northwest) is the northwest region of Bakersfield, California. It is bounded by the Kern River/Stockdale Highway to the south and State Route 99 to the east. The other boundaries are the city limits themselves.

Historically, this region was rural, with the farming communities of Fruitvale, Rosedale, and Greenacres. However, starting in the mid-1990s, this region started experiencing significant growth. The city limits have reached the boundaries of these communities.

The area incorporated by the city is primarily residential and retail, including some commercial. The area that is unincorporated is primarily industrial.

== Neighborhoods ==
=== Bakersfield Commons ===
Bakersfield Commons is a planned mixed-use project in the northwest. Its exact boundaries are currently unknown, but it will encompass land at the intersection of Coffee Road and Brimhall Road. The development will be constructed in three phases and take approximately 20 years to complete. It will employ a building policy where residential, commercial, and retail spaces will be constructed closely together to allow for easy access by foot.

Bakersfield Commons will also feature a new retail shopping center. Its design will emulate a main street, similar to The Grove in Los Angeles. According to advertisements from the developer, the goal will be to attract new businesses from outside the city rather than adding locations for existing businesses.

=== Riverlakes Ranch ===
Riverlakes Ranch is a neighborhood in the northwest. Starting north and traveling clockwise, it is roughly bounded by Olive Drive, Coffee Road, Rosedale Highway, and Allen Road. East of Coffee Road, there is a small segment that extends south to Fruitvale Avenue, next to the town of Fruitvale. It is a mixture of residential, commercial, and retail developments. The centerpiece of Riverlakes Ranch is The Links at Riverlakes Ranch public golf course. The design of the course was inspired by Scottish golf courses. Riverlakes Ranch also contains the Northwest Promenade, a shopping center nearly a mile long that contains anchors such as Walmart, Target, The Home Depot, Office Depot, Ross Dress for Less, Kohl's, Best Buy, Petco, Dick's Sporting Goods, and Cost Plus World Market.
