= Karen Goh =

American politician and non-profit executive from California

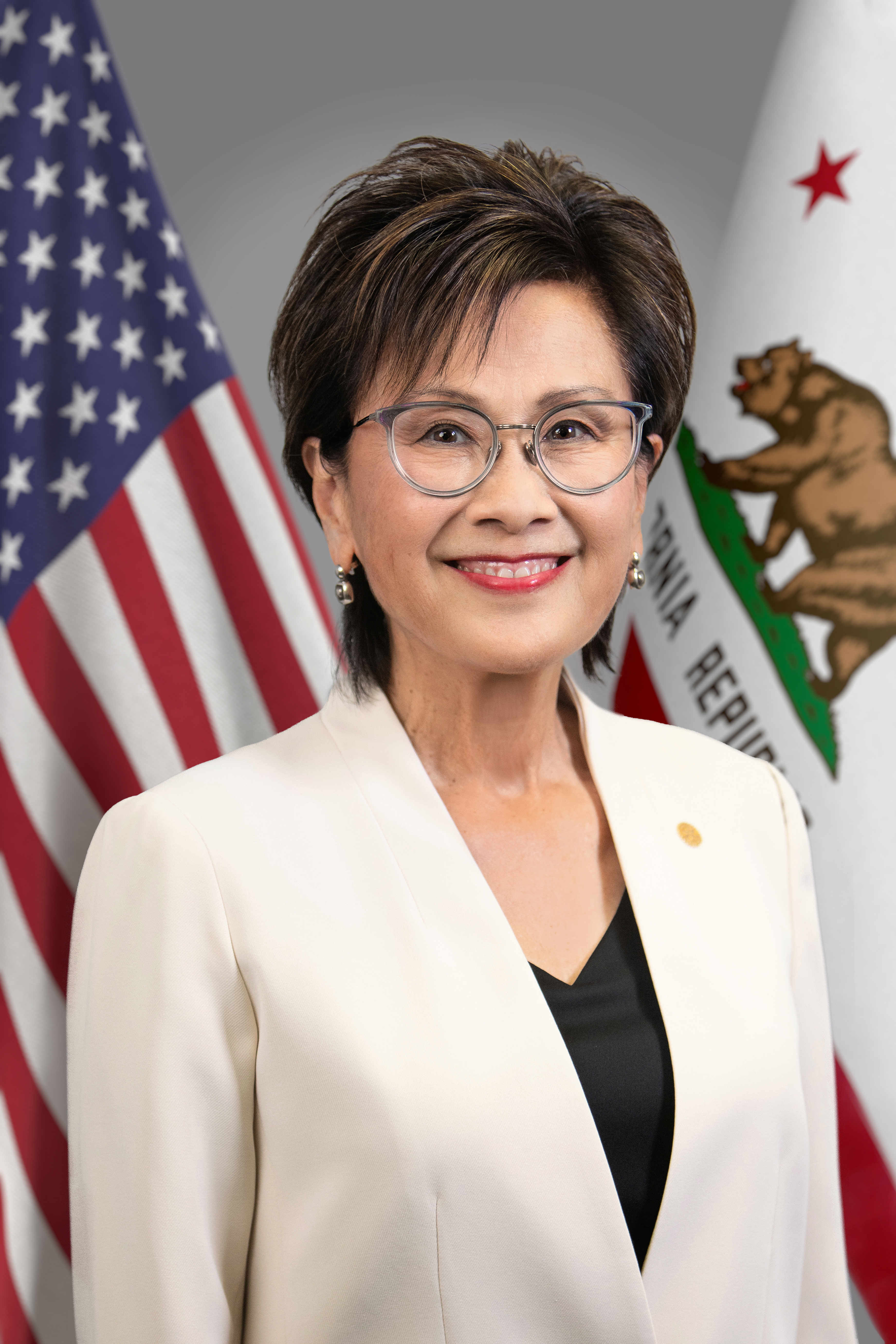
- Official portrait, 2025

26th Mayor of Bakersfield
- Incumbent
- Assumed office January 3, 2017
- Preceded by: Harvey Hall

Personal details
- Born: 1955 (age 70–71) Calcutta, India
- Party: Republican
- Education: University of Southern California (BM, MM)
- Website: Campaign website

Karen K. Goh (born 1955) is an American politician and non-profit organization executive serving as the 26th and current mayor of Bakersfield, California. Before becoming mayor of Bakersfield, Goh was a non-profit executive at Garden Pathways. Goh is Bakersfield's first mayor of Asian descent. Goh defeated her opponent Kyle Carter with 52.75% of the votes. Goh was elected into office during November 2016, and was re-elected to an additional four-year term in March 2020, operating under a council manager form of government.

Goh is Bakersfield's first minority mayor and second woman to hold the position, after Mary K. Shell.

Goh serves on the boards of the Rotary Club of Bakersfield, Bakersfield Arts District Foundation, and Kern Leadership Alliance.

== Early life and education ==
Goh was born to missionary parents Harry and Kathleen that came to British Colonial India. Goh has a brother, David Goh. In June 1962, at seven years old, Goh and her family moved to Bakersfield, California. Goh's parent provided ministry leadership for the Bakersfield Chinese Church, where Goh's older brother, David, currently works as a senior pastor. Goh's family founded Garden Community Church in Bakersfield, California.

In 1978, Goh earned a Bachelor of Music degree in Music Education from the University of Southern California (USC) then earned a Master of Music Education in 1981. Goh specialized in playing the clarinet. In 1991, after graduating, Goh found a position with The McGraw-Hill Companies in New York City. At age 12, Goh became a naturalized American citizen. Goh graduated from Bakersfield High School.

== Early career ==
=== Music instructor ===
Goh was a music instructor at Bakersfield Christian Life Schools before moving to New York City to work at the McGraw-Hill Companies in 1989. She was promoted from Executive Editor to editorial director during her seven years working with the company.

=== Administrator/Vice president (1989–2002) ===
In 1996, Goh moved from an instructor towards managing editor of The McGraw-Hill Companies in New York, and was then promoted as the Vice president of the publishing operations. Under this position, Goh was responsible for managing administrative operations such as trademarks, finances, human resources, and any facilities for the company. Goh worked as the vice president for two years from 2002 to 2004 for the McGraw Hill Company. Goh worked for the McGraw-Hill company for eight years, ending her position with the company in 2004.

=== Executive director (2005–2010) ===
In 2005, Goh became the executive director for the non-profit Garden Pathways, an organization that provides training and mentorship for youth and young adults. In 2013, Goh became the president and CEO of Garden Pathways, in Bakersfield.

=== County supervisor (2010–2013) ===
On December 10, 2010, Goh became the fifth district supervisor of Kern County in Bakersfield after she was appointed by the former governor, Arnold Schwarzenegger. In her position as a member of the Board of Supervisors, Goh was in charge of the executive and legislative matters involving Kern County and its special districts.

== 2016 mayoral campaign ==
On February 18, 2016, Karen Goh announced an interest in considering running for mayor. After former Bakersfield mayor Harvey L. Hall issued a statement that he would not be running for a fifth term for the ceremonial mayoral position. The field of mayoral candidates grew to 25 candidates.

Karen Goh announced her formal candidacy on February 29, 2016. Kyle Carter and Karen Goh entered the 2016 mayoral runoff in November of that year. Goh pulled ahead with 33.31% of the votes (18,825) to Carter's 32.54% .

Karen Goh received the public endorsement from Bakersfield Chamber's PAC on November 7, 2016. There was criticism of the action, considering that Goh served on the board, the action seemed to be influenced by Goh's presence. However, the Chamber clarified that it was an independent entity from the board and is not influenced by outside forces. As the PAC is funded by members and the Chamber is a membership organization, the Chamber PAC claimed this served to validate the endorsement of Goh for mayor.

On November 8, 2016, at age 60, Goh won the runoff election and became the 26th mayor of Bakersfield, California. Goh defeated Kyle Carter with 52.75% of the votes. Goh became the first mayor of Asian descent and second woman mayor in Bakersfield, California.

On January 4, 2017, Karen Goh was sworn in as the 26th mayor of Bakersfield. The mayoral position within Bakersfield has symbolic power in the eyes of the public, as the mayor can only vote in the event of a tie within council meetings, however, the Mayor holds soft power in the influence over matters involving the city.

== 2020 mayoral campaign ==
Karen Goh sought out reelection for a second term. Two other candidates decided to run against Goh. The second candidate was Greg Tatum, being the 60-year-old pastor of Change Community Church. The third candidate was Joseph Caporali, the 88-year-old CEO of Caporali Productions.

The election took place on March 3, 2020, with Goh winning 83.6 percent of the vote. Goh was sworn into office again on January 6, 2021.

== Political positions ==
=== Environment ===
Goh is an active member on the Keep Bakersfield Beautiful board, which works to clean up litter throughout the city and tracks the litter levels. Goh responded to the increase in litter levels by collaborating with Golden Empire Transit to place more garbage bins around bus stations.

Goh was a part of the decision to have solar panels installed across the city of Bakersfield, as well as the building of the energy innovation center. These were both enacted in hopes of having a more environmentally friendly way of energy consumption, and as a way to save taxpayers money. This was one of the main points that Goh spoke on at the event of introducing the solar panels. Goh let the members of Bakersfield know that this would be saving them money as taxpayers. The energy innovation center was possible through $83 million in state funding.

=== Policing ===
In the summer of 2020, Goh and the city council approved $120 million police budget, despite protests following the murder of George Floyd. This created 44 new jobs at the Bakersfield police station and 97 jobs in other public safety-related fields. Nonetheless, Goh agreed to review policing policies.

Goh has expressed a desire to improve relationships between the police force and the citizens of Bakersfield, and attended events such as Kids and Cops, which partnered officers with children to play games and form positive connections.

=== Homelessness ===
Goh does not support direct aid for homeless people, stating that it increases substance abuse and panhandling.

On April 18, 2018, Goh lobbied for Assembly Bill 3171, which would give $1.5 billion to local governments to be able to aid their homeless population. There was a 9% increase in homelessness within Bakersfield in 2018, the total population of homeless people being 885, and the number of unsheltered homeless people had grown to 46% of the homeless population.

Goh has stated that Bakersfield is not able to provide mental health and substance abuse aid and that there was an increase in service resistance.

=== Education ===
On May 6, 2022. Goh had announced a $5.4 million youth employment program.

=== COVID-19 response ===
Goh has stated that she endorses the mask mandate and encourages all residents to do the same and follow social distancing guidelines. Goh has also stated her appreciation for all healthcare workers as COVID cases rise throughout the country.

On February 2, 2021, Goh signed a letter which encouraged the state of California to approve COVID-19 vaccinations for TK through second grade students and educators.

=== Transportation ===
The city of Bakersfield has done many things to make transportation easier as well as promote more active ways of transport. They promoted biking by building a bicycle transportation network that connects throughout the city so that bicyclists can explore new parts of the city. They also have lots of events to encourage and promote biking, such as bike to work day or the Sunday city bike ride. They also designed the Thomas Roads Improvement Program (TRIP) to improve outdated infrastructure and create less travel time throughout the city. TRIP has completed many different projects which have either provided widening of roads, interchanges, or new parkways, all to make transportation easier.

== Personal life ==
Goh attributed witnessing the 9/11 terrorist attacks from her office window to her decision to work in local government. In March 2004, Goh's mother died in Bakersfield. In 2005, Goh moved from the East Coast back to Bakersfield. Goh is unmarried.

== Awards ==
- League of Women Voters of Kern County "2013 Carrie Catt Award" for outstanding community service.
- 2014 Women Inspiring Girls Award. Presented by Girl Scouts for exemplary achievement in the community and as a role model for girls.
- Kern Council of Governments "2014 Darrel Hildebrand Distinguished Leadership Award"
- Kern County Hispanic Chamber of Commerce "2014 Community Service Award"
- 2015 California Woman of Excellence. Presented by Distinguished Young Women of California.
- 2015 International Women's Day Award. Presented by International Women's Day Inc.
- 2016 Wendy Wayne Award. Presented by Cal State Bakersfield/Kegley Institute of Ethics.
- Community Action Partnership of Kern "2017 Humanitarian of the Year"

== See also ==
- 2016 Bakersfield, California mayoral election
- List of mayors of Bakersfield

Political offices
Preceded by Harvey Hall	Mayor of Bakersfield; 2017–present	Incumbent
