= Harvey Hall (politician) =

American businessman and politician (1941-2018)

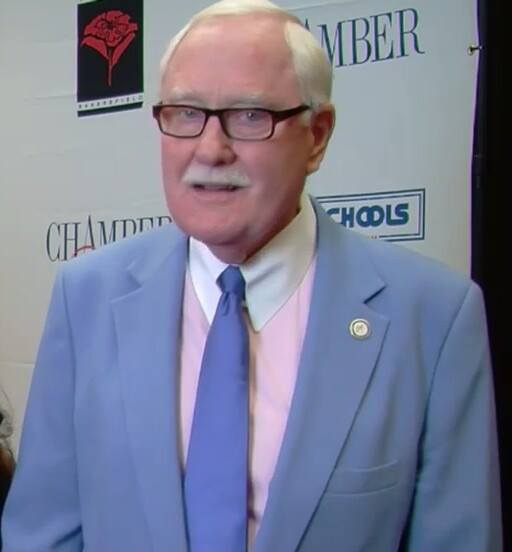

25th Mayor of Bakersfield
- In office January 2, 2001 – January 3, 2017
- Preceded by: Bob Price
- Succeeded by: Karen Goh

Personal details
- Born: January 5, 1941; Bakersfield, California, U.S.
- Died: May 19, 2018 (aged 77); Bakersfield, California, U.S.
- Political party: Republican
- Spouse: Lavonne Hall
- Children: 2

Harvey L. Hall (January 5, 1941 – May 19, 2018) was an American businessman and politician who served as the 25th mayor of Bakersfield, California. Hall was first elected in 2000, and re-elected in 2004, 2008 and 2012. He was one of the longest-serving mayors in Bakersfield's history. As mayor, one of his focuses had been beautification, through "Keep Bakersfield Beautiful" and the creation of, and participation in, monthly "Mayor's Freeway Cleanups", trash pickups on local freeways. Hall had donated his mayor's salary to the Kern Community Foundation.

Hall was the founder and former president of Hall Ambulance Service.

== Biography ==
Hall was born and raised in Bakersfield. He attended Bakersfield High School, Bakersfield Community College and San Francisco City College where he majored in Journalism, Personnel Management, and Emergency Medicine.

In 1960, Hall embarked on a career in the emergency medical services field and in 1971 founded Hall Ambulance Service, Inc., where he served as President/CEO, until his death 45 years later.

Hall Ambulance is currently the largest emergency and non-emergency medical transportation provider in Kern County. In addition, Hall Ambulance is the largest privately owned emergency and non-emergency medical transportation provider in the State of California. Hall Ambulance is an active member of both the American Ambulance and the California Ambulance Associations respectively.

In 1999, Hall entered the race for Mayor of the City of Bakersfield, with his campaign focused on quality of life issues, city beautification and restoration, business and education. Running under the slogan “Unity in the Community,” Hall handily defeated a slate of nine other candidates in the March 2000 election to go on to become Bakersfield's 25th mayor.

On January 2, 2001, during his swearing-in ceremony, Hall recited this statement: “Our city is one of greatness, and it will be my goal everyday to make every day better than the day before, and to try and make this city the best city in America.”

Hall was re-elected in 2004, 2008 and 2012. On January 7, 2013, Hall was sworn-in to serve his fourth term in office, making him the longest-serving mayor in Bakersfield's history.

Some of Hall's goals, primarily, were to establish the Mayor's Scholarship Foundation. Since inception of the program, Hall donated his entire mayoral salary to the Kern Community Foundation to fund scholarships for local high school students attending local colleges or the university. To date, Hall has awarded 216 scholarships totaling $178,500. Hall has had a passion for, and is particularly fond of, participating in events that encourage children and young people to pursue their dreams and goals.

Hall organized monthly Mayor's Freeway Litter Clean-ups, and is active with the Keep Bakersfield Beautiful Committee and the annual Great American Clean-up.

In 2008, Hall introduced Home First: Kern County's Plan to End Chronic Homelessness, a 10-year comprehensive action plan created by collaborative efforts of the nonprofit, business, faith and public sector communities to address the challenging issue of homelessness.

The list of boards and committees to which Hall has found appointment is long, including a past gubernatorial appointment as a Director of the 15th District Agricultural Association (Kern County Fair Board), an Elected Trustee of the Kern Community College District and Board Member of the Bakersfield College Foundation.

Hall was selected as the 2013 recipient of the American Red Cross – Kern Chapter Real Heroes Life of Service Award in April 2013. This award recognizes a humanitarian with a lifetime commitment of selfless service to Kern County and one who impacts the quality of life for Kern County residents through volunteerism and philanthropy.

In March 2012, Hall accepted the 2011 Darrel Hildebrand Regional Award of Merit for Distinguished Leadershipfrom the Kern Council of Governments for achieving excellence in leading by example to improve Kern County's quality of life through championing beautification and restoration projects in the City of Bakersfield.

In November 2011, Hall was the recipient of two awards; The Iron Eyes Cody Award by the Keep America Beautiful Foundation, the organization's highest national award to an individual, for his exceptional leadership raising public awareness on litter prevention, roadside and community beautification, and solid waste issues. The Plank Foundation honored Hall as the 2011 Humanitarian of the Year for donating his time and energy to selflessly serving others in the community. In October 2011, the Kern High School District paid tribute to Hall for his outstanding contributions to education in Kern County with the Jim Burke Light and Liberty Award.

In 2010, the CSUB School of Business and Public Administration Executive Advisory Council honored Hall with the John Brock Community Service Award for his renowned record of exemplary community engagement and service.

== Personal life and death ==
Hall was married to his wife Lavonne for 29 years. He had one biological child from a previous marriage: Shelly as well as adopting Lavonne’s daughter, Amy. He died from complications of Creutzfeldt–Jakob disease on May 19, 2018, in Bakersfield, California.

Political offices
Preceded by Bob Price	Mayor of Bakersfield; 2001–2017	Succeeded by Karen Goh
