= Fruitvale, Kern County, California =

Unincorporated community in California, United States

Fruitvale
- Unincorporated community
- Location in California Fruitvale (the United States)
- Coordinates: 35°23′00″N 119°04′59″W
- Country: United States
- State: California
- County: Kern
- Elevation: 397 ft (121 m)

Fruitvale is an unincorporated community in Kern County, California, United States. It is located 4.5 miles (7.2 km) west of Bakersfield, at an elevation of 397 feet (121 m).

Fruitvale was founded in 1891.
