= Mayor of Bakersfield, California =

American mayor in California

Mayor of Bakersfield
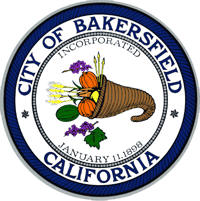
- Seal of Bakersfield

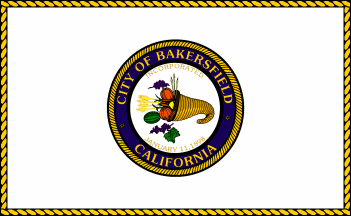
- Flag of Bakersfield

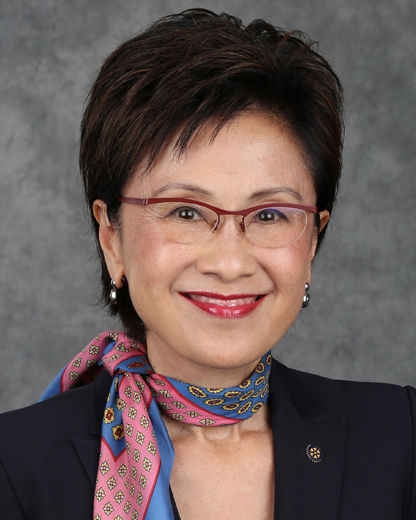
- Incumbent; Karen Goh since January 3, 2017
- Style: Honorable
- Term length: 4 years
- Formation: 1915
- Salary: $24,000
- Website: Mayor & City Council Homepage

The mayor of Bakersfield is the elected leader for the city of Bakersfield, California. Prior to 1957, the mayor was appointed by the city council and the head of the executive branch. After that time, the mayor was split into two positions. The city manager would be appointed by the city council and run the executive branch. The mayor would be elected by the citizens and serve as the leader for the city. The mayor is elected to four-year terms, under the single-winner voting system. There is no limit on the number of terms they can serve. The office of the mayor is located at City Hall but has no official residence.

== Powers and duties ==
The description for the office of mayor is largely described in Article III, Section 20 of the Bakersfield City Charter, although some duties are described elsewhere. The mayor's primary role is to represent the city to other governments and business, as well as participate in ceremonies. There are some official powers, although some are rarely used. The mayor is the presiding member for all city council meetings, although they can not interfere with the proceedings of the council. The mayor also has the power to call special meetings of the city council.

Probably one of the most important roles of the mayor is to cast the deciding vote when the city council is tied. This situation is very rare since the council is made up of seven members, an odd number. The only way for the city council to be deadlocked is either an odd number of abstaining votes, or an odd number of vacancies. This brings the number of possible votes to an even number, and a tie can occur.

Except for a tie, the mayor also votes in three other occasions. They cast a vote on the appointment and removal for the City Manager, and City Attorney. The other vote relates to city contract work. After a project has been approved by the city council, and bids have either been rejected or no bids submitted, the mayor may cast a vote for turning over the work to city employees. He can not bring the matter to a vote, but only cast a vote.

== List of mayors ==
This is a list of mayors of Bakersfield by term, name, and other comments.

- 1915–1917 George Hay
- 1917–1919 C.L. Taylor
- 1919–1921 Jay A. Hinman
- 1921–1923 E. L. Hougham
- 1923–1924 George Haberfelde
- 1924–1929 L. K. Stoner
- 1929–1931 Elmer Martin
- 1931–1933 H.D. Headen
- 1933–1935 J.R. Gist
- 1935–1940 George E. Wilson
- 1940–1941 Fred S. Boden
- 1941–1946 Alfred Siemon
- 1946–1947 Edward G. Norris
- 1947–1951 Jake Vanderlei
- 1951–1953 Frank Sullivan
- 1953–1957 Manuel J. Carnakis
- 1957–1961 Frank Sullivan
- 1961–1965 Gene Winer
- 1965–1969 Russel V. Karlan
- 1969-1981 Donald M. Hart
- 1981–1985 Mary K. Shell (1927–2018) – First woman mayor.
- 1985–1989 Thomas Anthony Payne
- 1989–1993 Clarence E. Medders
- 1993–2001 Robert "Bob" Otis Price (1932–2011)
- 2001–2017 Harvey Hall (1941–2018) – 25th mayor.
- 2017–present Karen Goh – First mayor of Asian descent. Second woman mayor.
