= Bakersfield Register of Historic Places and Areas of Historic Interest =

The Bakersfield Register of Historic Places and Areas of Historic Interest consist of buildings and sites designated by the City of Bakersfield, California, as significant historic resources.

Bakersfield's historic preservation program operates on a voluntary basis. The city may not designate a property on its register without being affirmatively petitioned by the property owner requesting inclusion. The program is overseen by a Historic Preservation Commission made up of citizens appointed by the City Council with special expertise and interest in historic preservation.

In the first five years of the city's historic preservation program (1992-1997), 12 buildings were listed on the Bakersfield Register of Historic Places. In the more than 20 years thereafter, only three buildings and a cemetery have been added. With only 16 sites on its local register (compared to more than 300 sites designated by the City of Fresno), Bakersfield has been criticized for its lack of focus on historic preservation.

These listings represent local designations by the City of Bakersfield. In addition, five buildings in Bakersfield have been listed on the National Register of Historic Places (NRHP) and are also listed below. Of the five buildings listed on the NRHP, only the Jastro Building (also known as the Standard Oil Building) has been cross-designated on the Bakersfield Register of Historic Places. There are also four sites within the city that have been designated as California Historical Landmarks; two of these buildings no longer exist, and none of the state landmarks have been cross-designated on the Bakersfield Register of Historic Places.

A map displaying the locations of Bakersfield's designated historic places and areas of historic interest, as well as the four buildings listed on the NRHP and four sites listed as California Historical Landmarks, can be viewed by clicking "OpenStreetMap" in the template found to the right below.

== Bakersfield Register of Historic Places ==
#	Name	Image	Location	Designated	Description
1	The Hayden Building		1622 19th Street; 35.37651667°N 119.02081667°W	2/12/92	Second Renaissance Revival building built in 1904 by the Kern County Land Company; occupants have included the Hayden Furniture Company, the Ancient Order of United Workmen, Mrs. Andrews Dancing Hall, the Continental Hotel, and the Valley Office Supply Company, and the Spotlight Theatre and Cafe
2	Woman's Club of Bakersfield		2030 18th Street; 35.375392°N 119.025005°W	2/12/92	Colonial style building opened in 1921
3	Frank Munzer House		1701 F Street; 35.374476°N 119.023629°W	2/12/92	Craftsman home built c. 1903 for Frank G. Munzer, Office Superintendent for the Kern County Land Company and a partner in the Breckenridge Lumber Company
4	The Guild House		1905 18th Street; 35.375222°N 119.023740°W	4/8/92	Craftsman house built in 1908
5	Colonial Apartments		1701 B Street; 35.374493°N 119.028283°W	5/20/92	
6	The McGill Building		1821-29 B Street; 35.375617°N 119.028277°W	9/16/92	
7	China Alley		Alley between L & M and 21st & 22nd Streets; 35.378735°N 119.015978°W	9/16/92	The historic center of Bakersfield's original Chinatown, occupied in the late 1800s by approximately 3,000 Chinese nationals brought to California for railroad construction
8	Curran House		222 Eureka Street; 35.374292°N 119.001450°W	2/1/93	
9	Standard Oil Building, aka the Jastro Building		1800 19th Street	2/23/94	Second Renaissance Revival office building built in 1917; also listed in 1983 on the National Register of Historic Places
10	Fox Theater		2001 H Street; 35.377343°N 119.021365°W	8/24/94	Spanish Colonial Revival theater designed by S. Charles Lee, opened in 1930, rebuilt 1953; remodeled after a 1952 earthquake with Art Moderne interior
11	Spencer House		1321 N Street; 35.369715°N 119.014227°W	11/8/95	Queen Anne/Eastlake house built in 1890 at corner of 14th and Chester; moved to present location in 1928
12	Hugh Curran home		1910 Alta Vista Drive; 35.389324°N 118.995260°W	7/16/97	
13	Jastro House		1811 20th Street; 35.377123°N 119.022588°W	3/9/05	Two-story Gothic Victorian Cottage owned by Henry Jastro, head of the Kern County Land Company and Chairman for 24 years of the Kern County Board of Supervisors
14	Kern County Chamber of Commerce Building		3801 Chester Avenue; 35.394198°N 119.018817°W	3/12/08	Built 1927-28 with Beaux Arts, Mission Revival, and Arts and Crafts influences; now part of the Kern County Museum
15	Union Cemetery		King and Potomac Streets; 35.364662°N 118.994178°W	10/27/12	Pioneers Section; burial place of local historic figures and Bakersfield's founding fathers
16	Mt. Zion Missionary Baptist Church		825 California Avenue; 35.368375°N 119.011014°W	3/8/17	African-American Baptist church built c. 1926; congregation active in Bakersfield since 1886

== Bakersfield Areas of Historic Interest ==
Name	Image	Location	Designated	Description
James McKamy House		2124 E Street; 35.378800°N 119.024496°W	3/16/10	Single-story wood frame house
R.L. Brown House		2128 E Street; 35.378962°N 119.024388°W	5/18/10	

== NRHP listings in Bakersfield ==
Name	Image	Location	Designated	Description
First Baptist Church		1200 Truxtun Avenue; 35.373889°N 119.015°W	1/2/79	Mission/Spanish Revival, Romanesque church built in 1931
Kern Branch, Beale Memorial Library, aka Baker Street Library		1400 Baker Street; 35.383219°N 118.990729°W	4/1/81	Classical Revival, Beaux-Arts library built 1913-15
Bakersfield Californian Building		1707 Eye Street; 35.375°N 119.019444°W	3/10/83	Italian Renaissance Revival built 1926 as home of the newspaper, The Bakersfield Californian
Jastro Building, aka Standard Oil Building		1800 19th Street; 35.376389°N 119.021667°W	9/22/83	Second Renaissance Revival office building built in two sections in 1917 and 1921
Tevis Block, aka Kern County Land Company Building		1712 19th Street; 35.376667°N 119.020556°W	3/29/84	Second Renaissance Revival office building built in 1893; built by the Kern County Land Company

== California Historical Landmarks in Bakersfield ==
Number	Name	Image	Location	Description
277	Garces Memorial Circle		Chester Ave & 30th St. 35.386806°N 119.019023°W	A traffic circle featuring a 1939 sculpture of Father Francisco Garces by John Palo-Kangas; it is located at the approximate site where in 1776 the Spanish Franciscan friar Francisco Garcés visited a Native American rancheria; Garcés named the location, San Miguel de los Noches por el Santa Príncipe; listed as a California Historical Landmark in 1937
382	Colonel Thomas Baker Memorial		Bakersfield City Hall, 1501 Truxtun Ave. 35.373254°N 119.018952°W	Memorial statue and marker in front of the Bakersfield City Hall South honoring Col. Thomas Baker who founded Bakersfield in 1863; listed as a California Historical Landmark in 1944
690	Site of the last home of Alexis Godey		414 19th St. W. 35.376620°N 119.006370°W	Home of Alexis Godey from 1883 to 1889; Godey was a guide for John C. Frémont's expedition through the area in 1843-44 and was honored for his services at the Battle of San Pasqual in 1846; listed as a California Historical Landmark in 1959
732	Site of the home of Elisha Stevens		W. Columbus & Isle Verde Sts. 35.397383°N 119.005769°W	Home of Elisha Stevens who in 1844 led the Murphy-Townsend wagon train from Iowa to Sutter's Fort; he became the first permanent European settler in the Bakersfield district, living there until his death 1887; listed as a California Historical Landmark in 1960

== See also ==
- National Register of Historic Places listings in Kern County, California
- California Historical Landmarks in Kern County, California
