= Shafter station =

Shafter station could refer to:

- Shafter station (Atchison, Topeka and Santa Fe Railway), a historic train station in Shafter, California
- Revere/Shafter station, a light rail station in San Francisco, California
- Shafter Research Station, an agricultural research station in Shafter, California
