= Jastro Building =

- U.S. National Register of Historic Places
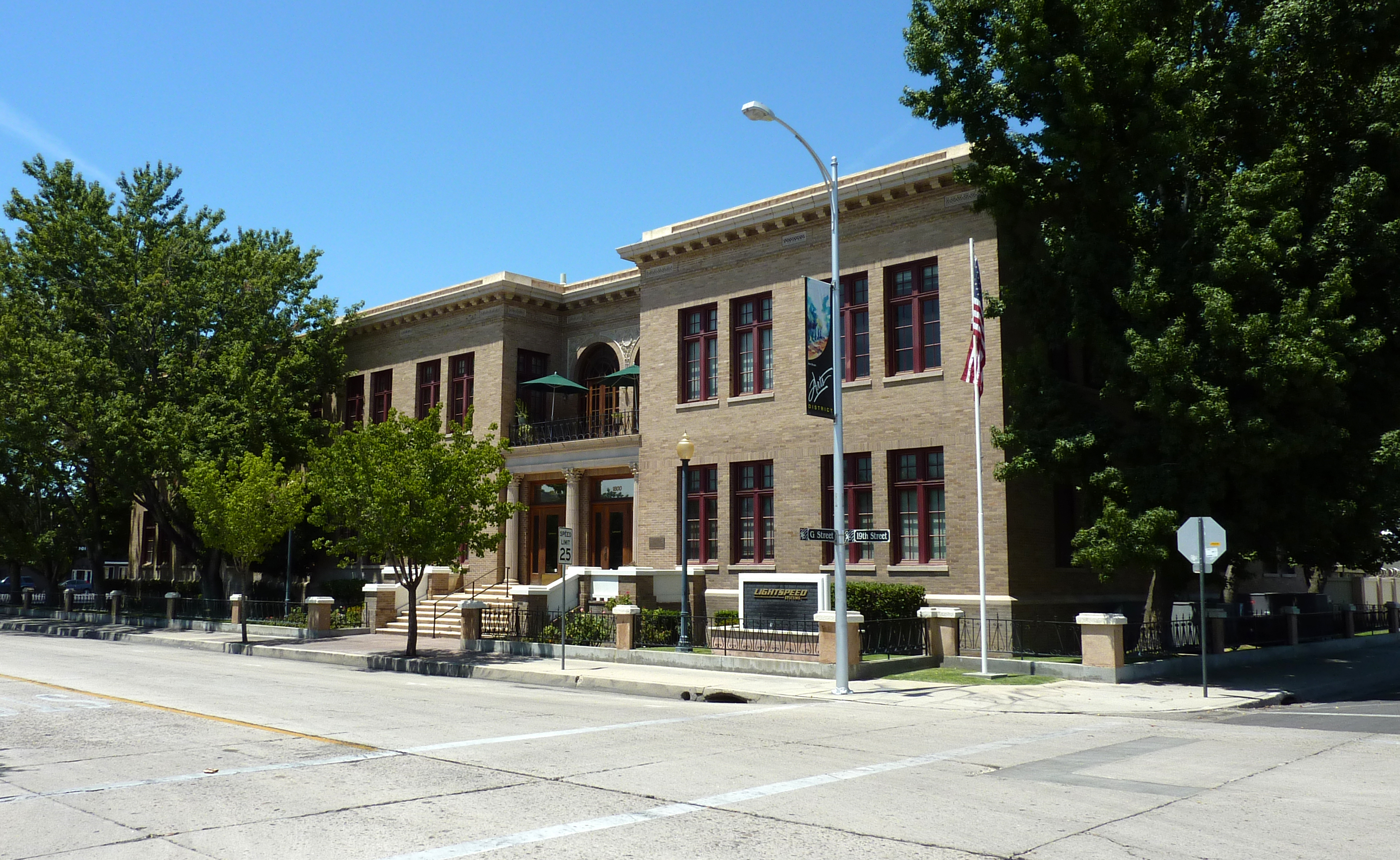

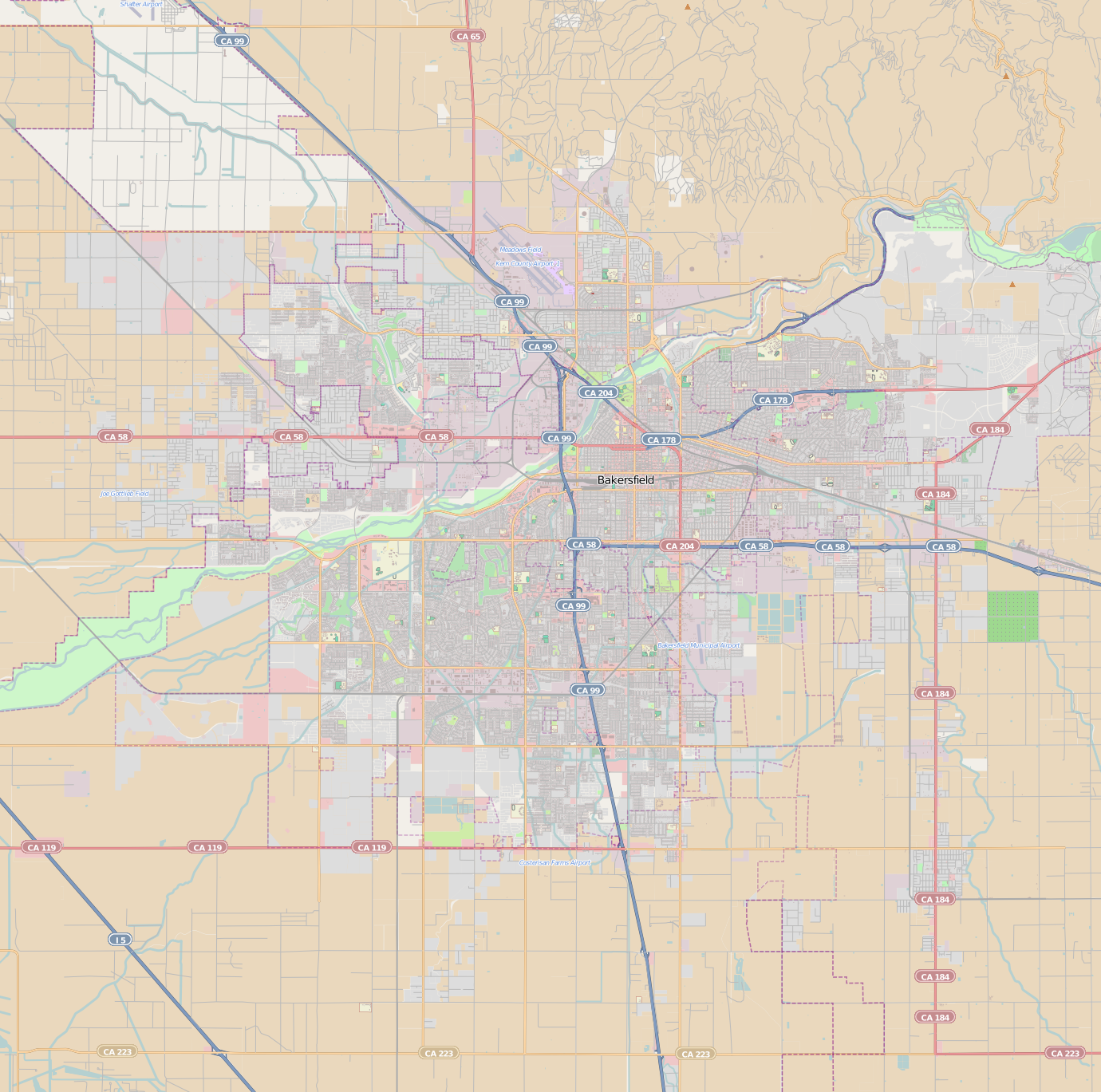
- Location within Bakersfield, California Location within California Location within the United States
- Location: 1800 19th St., Bakersfield, California
- Coordinates: 35°22′35″N 119°1′18″W
- Area: 0.3 acres (0.12 ha)
- Built: 1917
- Architect: Hinshaw, Everett; Currie & Dugler
- Architectural style: Late 19th And 20th Century Revivals, Second Renaissance Revival
- NRHP reference No.: 83001182
- Added to NRHP: September 22, 1983

The Jastro Building, also known as the Standard Oil Building, is a historic office building in Bakersfield, California. The structure was placed on the National Register of Historic Places (NRHP) on September 22, 1983.

== Structure ==
The Jastro Building a two-story structure in downtown Bakersfield, California. Built in the late-Second Renaissance Revival architecture style, it was constructed in two sections in 1917 and 1921; the latter added a 10,000 square feet (930 m^{2}) wing. The first floor is designed in a "C" shape, with an indentation at the rear of the building. The second floor has an "H" shape design with an indented porch over the front and a south-facing facade; the main entrance is on the first floor below the porch. The structure has a flat roof with boxed cornice bracketed parapet. The windows are vertical, 2-sash casement windows with transom. The second-story center porch windows have molded arches with frieze.

== Significance ==
The Standard Oil Company entered the substantial oil industry in Kern County in 1902 to develop its holdings in the Kern River Oil Field. With the construction of the Jastro Building, the company moved its Central California operations to Bakersfield. When it was built, it was the first commercial building in the downtown commercial district built across the city's G Street. It is one of the finest examples of its type of architecture to survive the devastating 1952 Kern County earthquake relatively unscathed.

== See also ==
- Bakersfield Register of Historic Places and Areas of Historic Interest
- California Historical Landmarks in Kern County, California
- National Register of Historic Places listings in Kern County, California
- Henry A. Jastro, Commodore of Kern County
