= Fox Theater (Bakersfield, California) =

Theatre in Bakersfield, California

The Historic Bakersfield Fox Theater
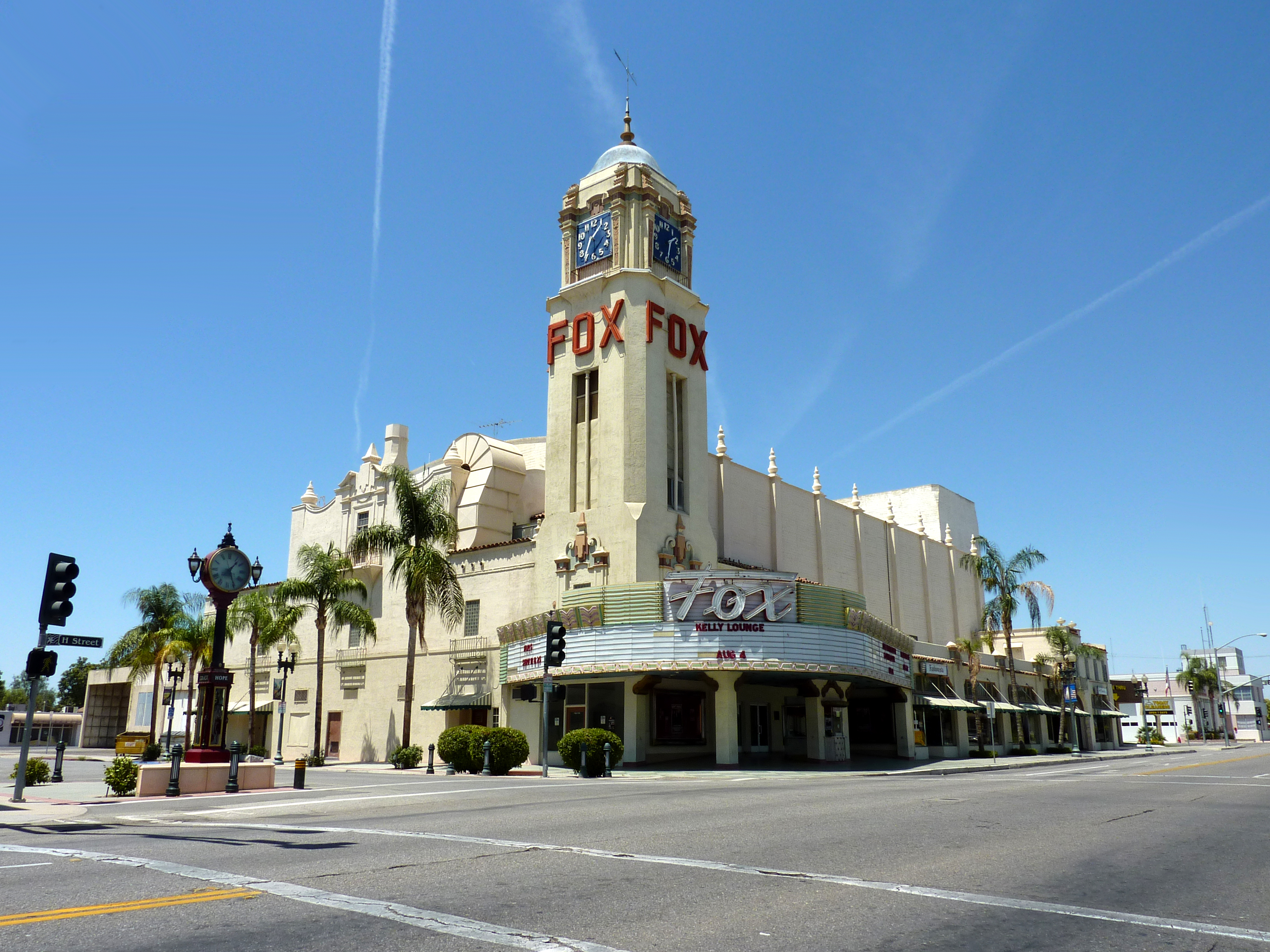
- Bakersfield Fox Theater
- Interactive map of The Historic Bakersfield Fox Theater
- Address: 2001 H Street; Bakersfield, California
- Coordinates: 35.37756°N 119.02152°W
- Owner: Fox Theater Foundation
- Capacity: 1500

Construction
- Opened: December 25, 1930
- Reopened: July 1, 1994
- Rebuilt: 1953
- Years active: 1930–1977, 1983–1984, 1994–Present
- Architect: S. Charles Lee

Website
- www.thebakersfieldfox.com

The Fox Theater is located at 2001 H Street in Downtown Bakersfield, California. The theater, which opened on Christmas Day 1930, is a historic performing arts and community events center located in downtown Bakersfield, and hosts a variety of events, ranging from ballets, numerous community events, movies to contemporary pop and rock acts.

== The early years ==
Bakersfield's Fox Theater opened on Christmas Day 1930, with the feature film Just Imagine, a sci-fi film set 50 years in the future. The 1930s were a strong period for the Fox Theater. The silver screen featured the latest "talkie" pictures, and the stage was graced by numerous acts including Bakersfield native Metropolitan Opera baritone Lawrence Tibbett (1933), world-renowned soprano Kirsten Flagstad (1939), the Los Angeles Philharmonic Orchestra (1939), and the classic pianist Arthur Rubinstein (1940).

Because of the Fox Theater's Type I construction of poured concrete over steel, the theater withstood the 1952 Kern County earthquake, which shook Bakersfield and leveled many buildings throughout the city.

=== Theater is remodeled to Art Deco theme ===
The Bakersfield Fox was an early work of Los Angeles theater architect S. Charles Lee. The exterior of the building is in the Spanish Colonial Revival style, as was the original interior. The 1500 seat auditorium was designed in the "atmospheric" style popularized by architect John Eberson, and featured a plain ceiling set with small lights to resemble stars in a night sky, while the walls were lined by decorative false walls with murals painted on the real walls behind them depicting open countryside, all meant to suggest that the auditorium was in fact a Mediterranean walled garden.

Though the building survived the 1952 earthquake intact, the following year the interior of the theatre was remodeled. The original Mediterranean theme was replaced with an Art Moderne motif, which was the style favored by Charles Skouras, then the head of Fox-West Coast Theatres. With the re-theme, a large concession area was added to the lower lobby of the theater. In the auditorium, the "garden walls" were stripped away, and the murals painted over. The ceiling's night sky effect with its twinkling recessed star lights was retained.

A more limited remodeling of the building's exterior brought a new marquee, box office, and entrance foyer, embellished with glitzy neon signage, colorful terrazzo flooring, and bright metals. The remodel was representative of 1950s Hollywood style and showmanship. With this remodel, the screen was replaced with a state-of-the-art super-wide CinemaScope 20 ft × 45 ft (6.1 m × 13.7 m) format and the theater's projectors were upgraded with 6000-watt carbon arc lamps and anamorphic lenses.

=== The Fox closes ===
In 1977, after 47 years in business, the Fox Theater closed its doors. The theater re-opened for a brief period in 1983 and 1984, but would fall into decay until 1994.

== The Fox Theater Foundation: Saving a historic landmark in downtown Bakersfield ==
In 1994, the Fox Theater was threatened by the inevitability of demolition. A small group of city businessmen and women joined together to save the theater, forming the Fox Theater Foundation. The Foundation's "Save the Fox" campaign raised enough funds from over 380 donors for the down payment on the building. Restoration began on July 1, 1994.

The theater in 2003

=== Walk of Stars ===
In early 2005, the Fox Theater Foundation launched the Walk of Stars program, a new fundraising program for the 75th Anniversary. The program is intended to pay for the numerous ongoing restoration and facility improvement projects needed to preserve this historic structure. The Stars are available for purchase by any member of the community. They are available at three different price levels, each level coming with special benefits and specific Star locations: $5,000 (14-inch stainless steel star), $10,000 (14-inch stainless steel star), $25,000 (16-inch stainless steel star). The Stars are customized with the donor's name or company name or logo.

=== 75th Anniversary Black Tie Gala ===
The Fox Theater's 75th Anniversary Black Tie Gala was a large-scale event mostly centered around nostalgia for the old theater and entertainment it has seen throughout the decades. The evening was divided between live music inside the theater, a slideshow with live commentary by Foundation board members, and dinner and dancing to live local music acts in the Theater's large storage and maintenance building, which was partially cleared out and re-decorated for the evening. The evening's highlight was a raffle for a $10,000 diamond pendant, all proceeds of which went to the Fox Theater Foundation for bills and restoration projects.

== The Fox Theater today ==
Today, the Fox Theater is the heart of Downtown Bakersfield's arts and entertainment district. The theater is home to FLICS, Bakersfield's foreign film program which runs fall through spring yearly, showcasing the best foreign film of the past year. On September 22, 2006, FLICS celebrated its Silver Anniversary at the Fox Theater, kicking off its 25th season with the film Tristram Shandy: A Cock and Bull Story. California rock band Black Veil Brides shot a majority of the music video for their 2011 song "Rebel Love Song" in front of the Theater. The Theater also hosts numerous local dance recitals, school graduations, business meetings as well as performing arts events such as Russian ballet.

== See also ==
- Bakersfield Register of Historic Places and Areas of Historic Interest
