= Courtlandt Gross House =

Historic house in California, United States

- U.S. National Register of Historic Places
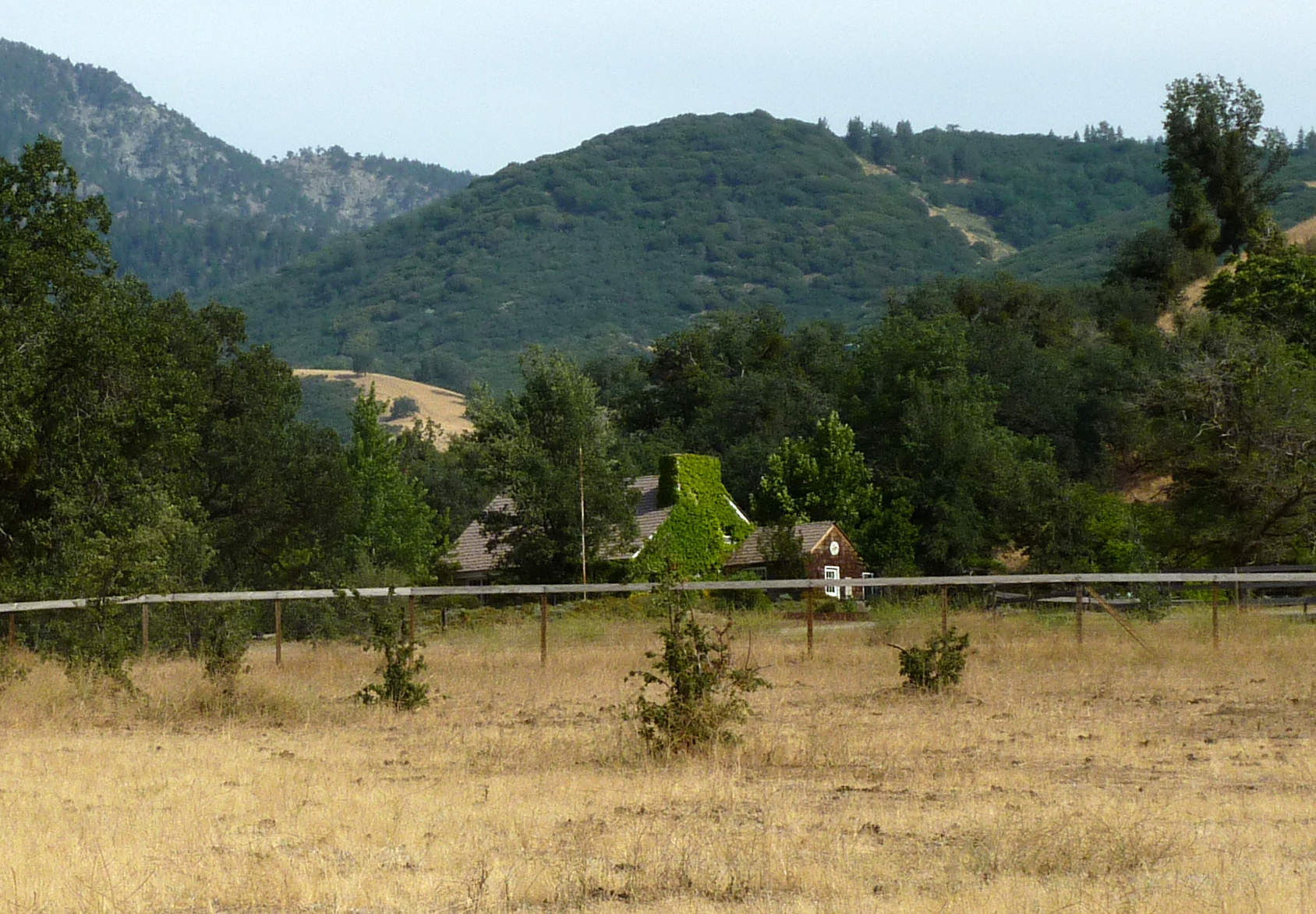

- Location within California Location within the United States
- Location: 18600 Courtlandt Court, Tehachapi, California
- Coordinates: 35°05′20″N 118°31′31″W
- Area: 20 acres (8.1 ha)
- Built: 1942
- Architect: Donald B. Parkinson
- Architectural style: Dutch Colonial Revival, Cape Cod
- NRHP reference No.: 87000669
- Added to NRHP: March 22, 1987

The Courtlandt Gross House is a historic house located at 18600 Courtlandt Court in Tehachapi, Kern County, California.

== History ==
Courtlandt Gross, president and board chairman of the Lockheed Corporation, owned the house. It was completed in the Tehachapi Mountains in 1942.

The Courtlandt Gross House was added to the National Register of Historic Places on March 22, 1987.

== Architecture ==
The house was designed by noted Los Angeles architect Donald Parkinson of Parkinson & Parkinson. The house is unusual among the Parkinsons' buildings, as they rarely designed residences, and mainly worked in the Los Angeles area. The Courtlandt Gross House is the only Parkinson-designed home outside of the Los Angeles area.

The stone house's design includes a steep gable roof and a prominent chimney at the end of the house. The design was influenced by the Dutch Colonial Revival and Cape Cod styles. Both styles are unusual in California architecture, and the house resembles 17th- and 18th-century houses in the northeastern United States.

While stone construction is typically avoided in California due to the risk of earthquake damage, the house survived the 1952 Tehachapi earthquake with only minor damage.

== See also ==
- John and Donald Parkinson buildings
- California Historical Landmarks in Kern County, California
- National Register of Historic Places listings in Kern County, California
