= White Wolf Fault =

Californian fault

Coordinates: 35.2510°N 118.6671°W

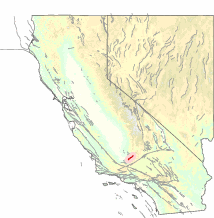
The White Wolf Fault (in red), Southern California

The White Wolf Fault is a fault in southern California, located along the northwestern transition of the Tejon Hills and Tehachapi Mountains with the San Joaquin Valley. It is north of the intersection of the San Andreas Fault and the Garlock Fault, and roughly parallel with the latter. It is classed as a reverse (vertical motion) fault with a left lateral (sinistral) component.

== Activity ==
The White Wolf Fault was the source of the 1952 Kern County earthquake on July 21 (M=7.3).

== See also ==
- 1857 Fort Tejon earthquake – 7.9 magnitude earthquake on the San Andreas Fault in the Tehachapi Mountains.
- Seismic faults of California
