= Le Conte station =

Muni Metro light rail station in San Francisco

Le Conte
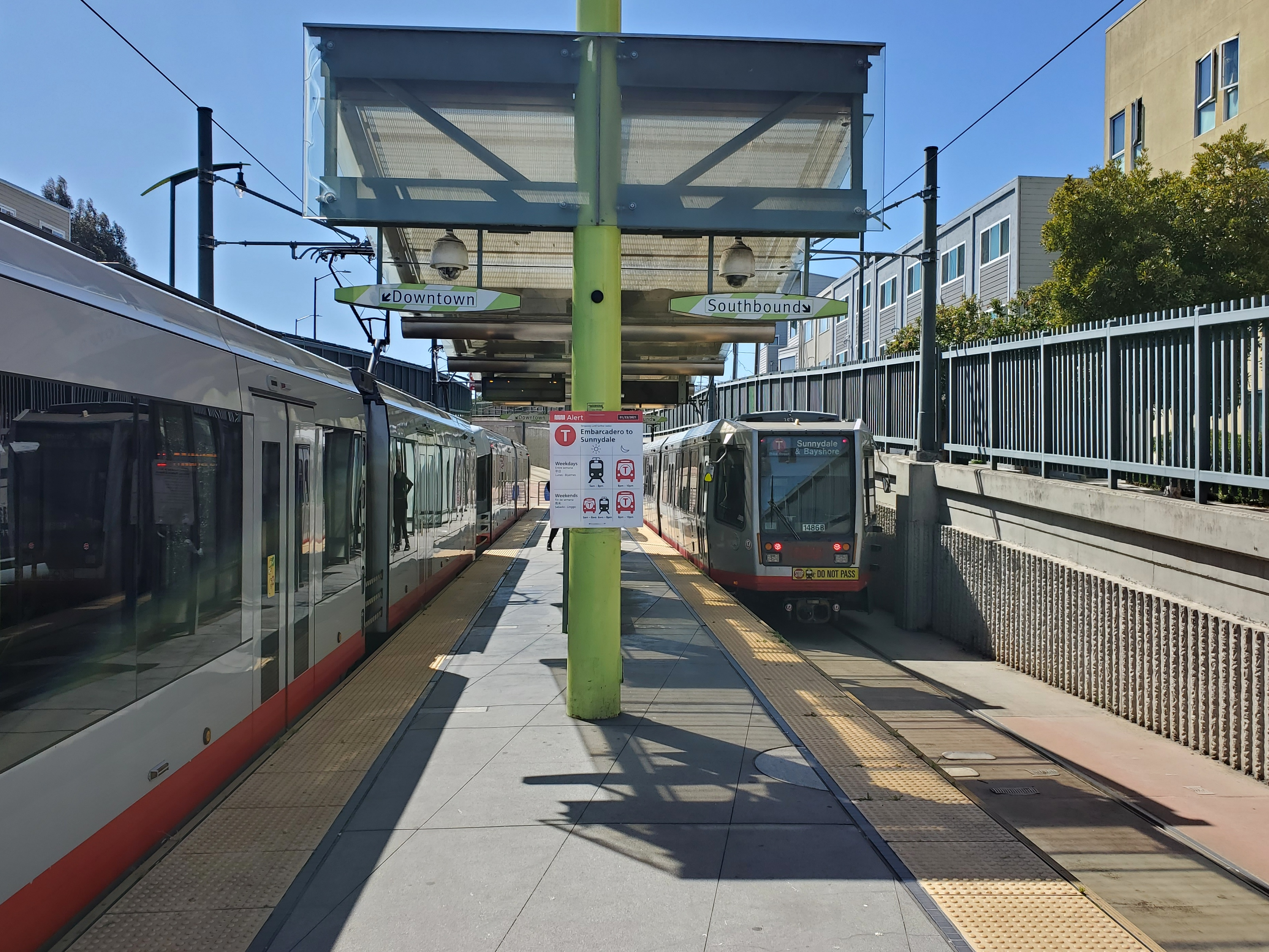
- Two trains at Le Conte station in March 2021

General information
- Location: Third Street at Le Conte Avenue; San Francisco, California
- Coordinates: 37°43′7.75″N 122°23′50.93″W
- Platforms: 1 island platform
- Tracks: 2

Construction
- Accessible: Yes

History
- Opened: January 13, 2007

Services
Preceding station	Muni	Following station
Gilman/Paul toward Chinatown	T Third Street	Arleta toward Sunnydale
Location

Le Conte station is a light rail station on the Muni Metro T Third Street line in the Bayview neighborhood of San Francisco, California. The station opened with the T Third Street line on January 13, 2007. It has a single island platform located in the median of Third Street south of Le Conte Avenue. The station is located in an open cut between the travel lanes of Third Street, which rise south of Le Conte Avenue to pass over Candlestick Hill and the Bayshore Freeway. South of the station, the line also rises to pass over the hill and highway.

The station is served by the T Bus and 91 Owl bus routes, which provide service along the T Third Street line during the early morning and late night hours respectively when trains do not operate.
