= Green Hotel =

- U.S. National Register of Historic Places
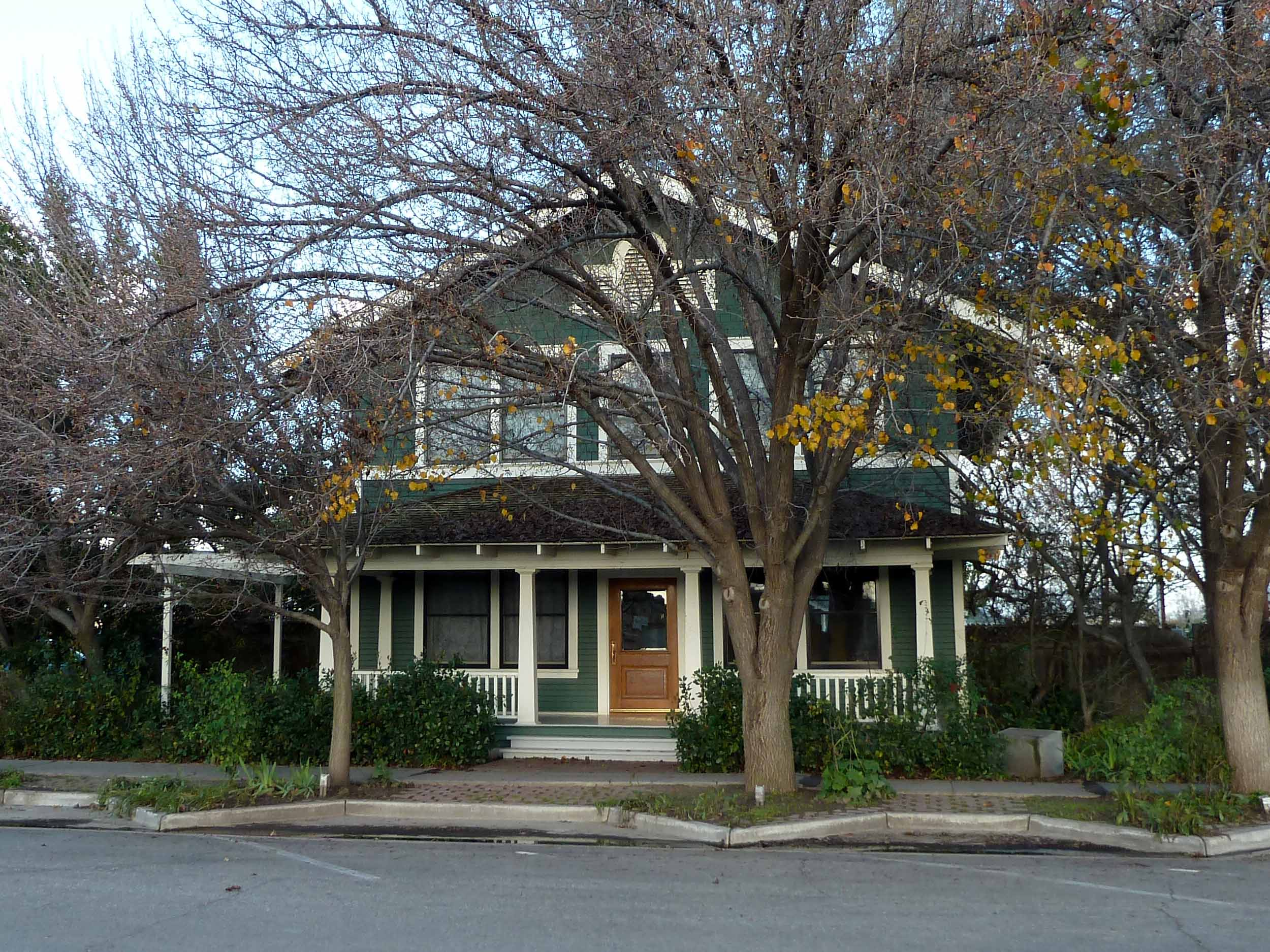

- Location within California Location within the United States
- Location: 530 James St., Shafter, California
- Coordinates: 35°30′6″N 119°17′6″W
- Area: 0.1 acres (0.040 ha)
- Built: 1913
- NRHP reference No.: 89000204
- Added to NRHP: March 16, 1989

The Green Hotel, also known as the Shafter Hotel, is a historic hotel building located at 530 James St. in Shafter, California. The hotel was built in 1913 by the Kern County Land Company as lodging for prospective buyers at the Shafter Townsite. It was both the first building built at the townsite and the first commercial building in Shafter. The wood frame hotel's design includes a gable roof with overhanging eaves, a Palladian vent at the front of the attic, and an open front porch. While the hotel was formally known as the Shafter Hotel, its forest green paint led it to be nicknamed the Green Hotel. Herndon and Marion Hitchcock bought the hotel in 1917 and operated it until Herndon's death in 1951. In 1938, the Hitchcocks rotated the hotel 90 degrees to face James Street. After Herndon's death, Marion leased the hotel as a residence until donating it to the city in 1961.

The hotel was added to the National Register of Historic Places on March 16, 1989. It is currently operated as a museum.

== See also ==
- California Historical Landmarks in Kern County, California
- National Register of Historic Places listings in Kern County, California
