= Kern County Chamber of Commerce Building =

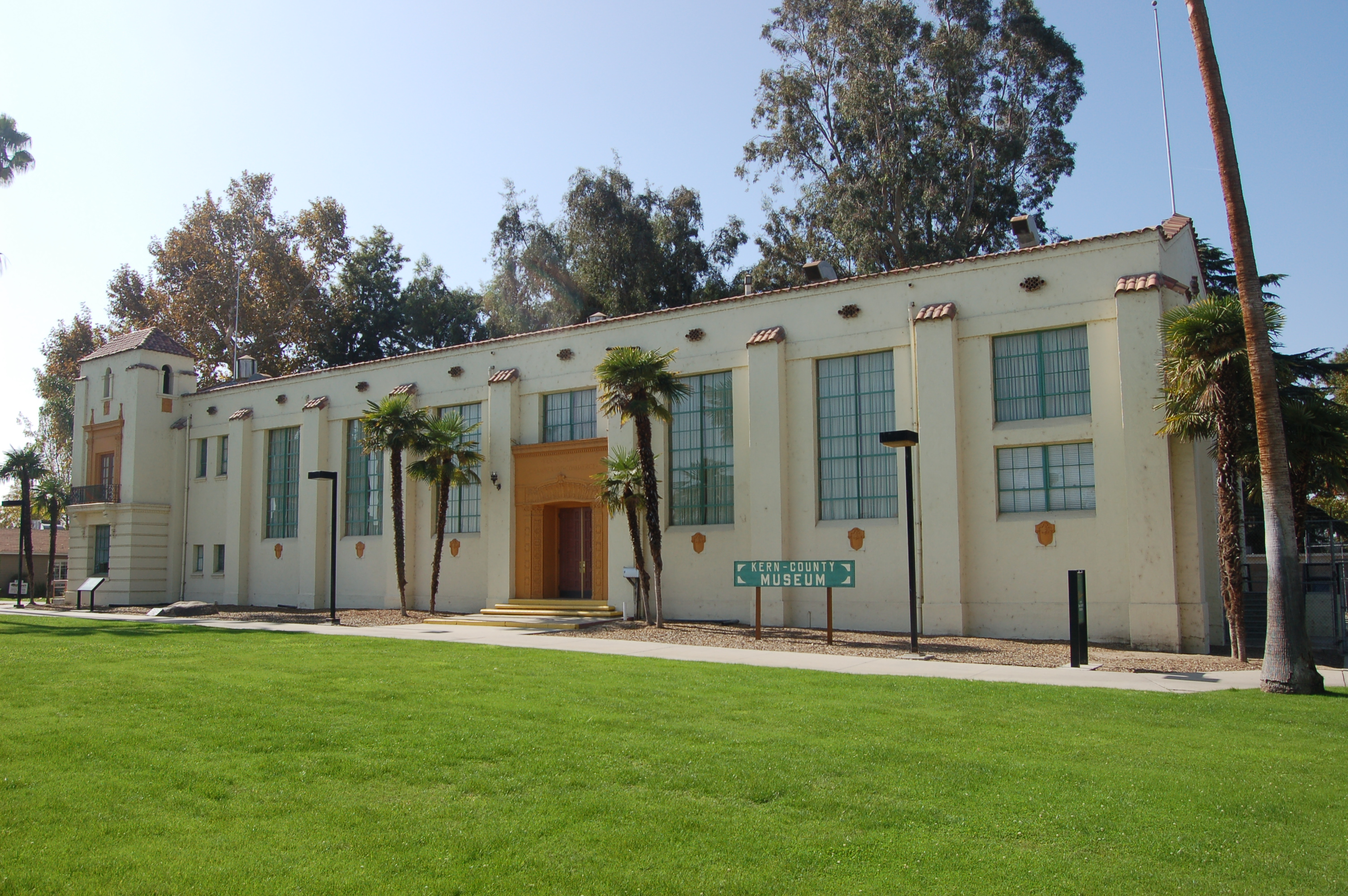
- West side of the Chamber of Commerce Building
- Interactive map of the Kern County; Chamber of Commerce Building area

General information
- Type: Exhibit Hall
- Architectural style: Beaux Arts, Mission Revival, Arts and Crafts
- Location: Bakersfield, California, 3801 Chester Avenue
- Coordinates: 35°23′37″N 119°01′10″W
- Construction started: 1927
- Completed: 1928
- Inaugurated: September 29, 1929
- Renovated: 2010
- Cost: $30,000 - $35,000
- Owner: County of Kern

Dimensions
- Diameter: 80 by 40 feet (24 m × 12 m) (Exhibit Hall); 145 by 45 feet (44 m × 14 m) (Total)

Technical details
- Structural system: Reinforced Concrete
- Floor area: 3,200 square feet (300 m^{2}) (Exhibit Hall); 6,525 square feet (606.2 m^{2}) (Total)

Design and construction
- Architect: Charles H. Biggar
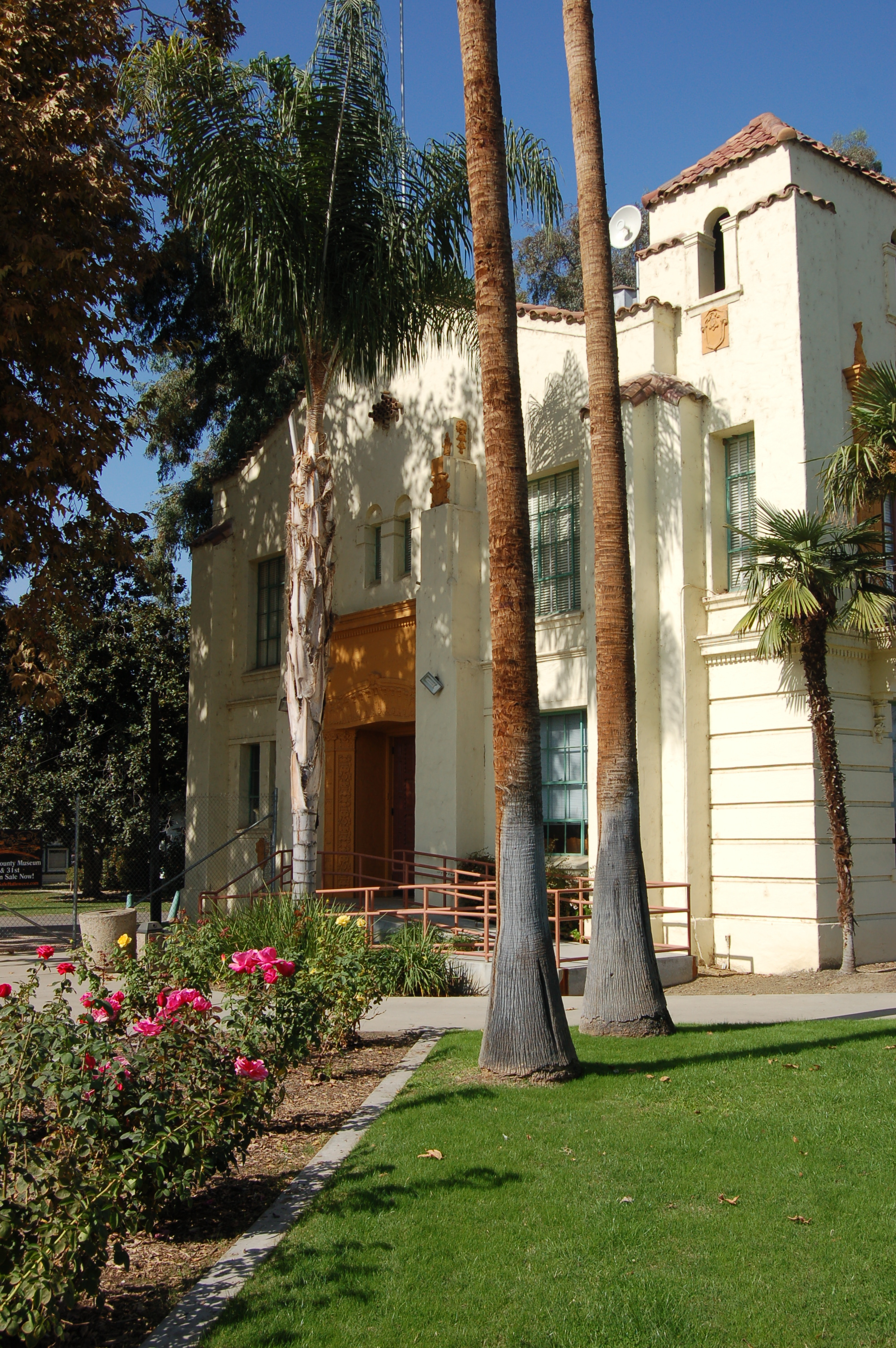
- Chamber of Commerce Building's south entrance.

References
- Bakersfield Life

The Kern County Chamber of Commerce Building is a historic building in Bakersfield, California. Located adjacent to Sam Lynn Ballpark and the Beale Memorial Clock Tower, it is a part of the Kern County Museum. The building is considered one of the best surviving examples of architecture by Charles H. Biggar. It is a combination of three architectural styles: Beaux Arts, Mission Revival, and Arts and Crafts . It is listed in the Bakersfield Register of Historic Places.

== History ==
In the mid-1920s, Kern County decided to build a structure that would showcase both products and innovations from the county. Although it would be the headquarters of the Kern County Chamber of Commerce, the building would be constructed by the county government. A site on Chester Avenue near the Kern River, which the county already owned, was selected. The location was chosen, in part, for two primary reasons: Chester Avenue was the route for U.S. Route 99 (Golden State Highway), the main highway connecting northern and southern California, and the site was adjacent to the Kern County Fairgrounds.

The building was designed by Charles H. Biggar in 1927 and completed in 1928, but the official opening was not until September 29, 1929.

In 1945, the Kern County Museum opened. It utilized a small portion of the Chamber of Commerce building. The museum became very popular, and the amount of artifacts on display continued to increase. By 1952, the museum was large enough that the Chamber of Commerce would move out of the building to a location in downtown. The museum would occupy the rest of the space. The structure was also converted to the museum's needs. This included covering the windows into the main hall, and covering the "Kern County Chamber of Commerce" entrance signs with "Kern County Museum" and the construction of a mezzanine.

In 2010, the building would undergo a major restoration effort. The goal was to restore the building to its original condition in 1928. The mezzanine was removed and the underlying paint was used to match the original color. The fluorescent lighting was replaced with chandeliers. The windows were reopened and museum sign was removed. In addition, the building exterior would return to the original multicolor paint scheme (at some point the build was painted completely white). The exhibits inside were removed and relocated to other parts of the museum. The hall is now rented for events.

== See also ==
- Bakersfield Register of Historic Places and Areas of Historic Interest
