= National Register of Historic Places listings in Kern County, California =

Location of Kern County in California

This is a list of the National Register of Historic Places listings in Kern County, California.

This is intended to be a complete list of the properties and districts on the National Register of Historic Places in Kern County, California, United States. Latitude and longitude coordinates are provided for many National Register properties and districts; these locations may be seen together in an online map.

There are 27 properties and districts listed on the National Register in the county, including 4 National Historic Landmarks.

This National Park Service list is complete through NPS recent listings posted September 4, 2026.

== Current listings ==
	Name on the Register	Image	Date listed	Location	City or town	Description
1	Bakersfield Californian Building	Bakersfield Californian Building	March 10, 1983 (#83001183)	1707 Eye St. 35°22′30″N 119°01′10″W	Bakersfield	
2	Bandit Rock	Bandit Rock	October 31, 1975 (#75000431)	Southwest of Inyokern near the junction of CA 14 and CA 178; 35°35′28″N 117°56′56″W	Inyokern	
3	Burro Schmidt's Tunnel	Burro Schmidt's Tunnel	March 20, 2003 (#03000113)	16 mi. SW of Ridgecrest; 35°24′38″N 117°52′34″W	Ridgecrest	
4	Errea House	Errea House	July 29, 1997 (#97000809)	311 S. Green St. 35°07′46″N 118°26′49″W	Tehachapi	
5	First Baptist Church	First Baptist Church	January 2, 1979 (#79000478)	1200 Truxtun Ave. 35°22′26″N 119°00′54″W	Bakersfield	
6	Fort Tejon	Fort Tejon	May 6, 1971 (#71000140)	3 mi. NW of Lebec; 34°52′23″N 118°53′45″W	Lebec	
7	The Fort	The Fort	July 22, 1981 (#81000151)	Ash and Lincoln sts. 35°09′02″N 119°27′54″W	Taft	
8	The Forty Acres	The Forty Acres	October 6, 2008 (#08001090)	30168 Garces Highway; 35°45′48″N 119°17′15″W	Delano	
9	Green Hotel	Green Hotel	March 16, 1989 (#89000204)	530 James St. 35°30′06″N 119°17′06″W	Shafter	
10	Courtlandt Gross House	Courtlandt Gross House	March 22, 1987 (#87000669)	18600 Courtlandt Ct. 35°05′20″N 118°31′31″W	Tehachapi	
11	Jastro Building	Jastro Building	September 22, 1983 (#83001182)	1800 19th St. 35°22′35″N 119°01′18″W	Bakersfield	
12	Kern Branch, Beale Memorial Library	Kern Branch, Beale Memorial Library	April 1, 1981 (#81000150)	1400 Baker St. 35°23′01″N 118°59′24″W	Bakersfield	
13	Last Chance Canyon	Last Chance Canyon	December 5, 1972 (#72000225)	Address Restricted	Johannesburg	
14	Long Canyon Village Site		April 14, 1980 (#80000803)	Address Restricted	South Lake	
15	Midway-Sunset Jack Plant		October 13, 2015 (#100009058)	25296 CA 33, approx. 1 mile (1.6 km) south of Derby Acres; 35°13′52″N 119°34′43″W	Fellows vicinity	
16	National Farm Workers Association Headquarters		October 13, 2015 (#15000715)	102 Albany St. 35°45′28″N 119°15′31″W	Delano	
17	Nuestra Senora Reina de la Paz	Nuestra Senora Reina de la Paz	August 30, 2011 (#11000576)	29700 Woodford-Tehachapi Rd. 35°13′25″N 118°33′33″W	Keene	designated a National Historic Landmark October 8, 2012
18	Ridge Route	Ridge Route	September 25, 1997 (#97001113)	Along Old Ridge Rte., roughly bounded by Sandberg and Canton Canyon (also extends into Los Angeles County); 34°37′56″N 118°41′49″W	Castaic	
19	Rogers Dry Lake	Rogers Dry Lake	October 3, 1985 (#85002816)	Edwards Air Force Base; 34°54′02″N 117°50′22″W	Mojave Desert	
20	Santa Fe Passenger and Freight Depot	Santa Fe Passenger and Freight Depot	January 19, 1982 (#82002187)	150 Central Valley Hwy. 35°30′18″N 119°16′35″W	Shafter	
21	Shafter Research Station	Shafter Research Station	October 17, 1997 (#97001211)	17053 Shafter Ave. 35°31′52″N 119°16′41″W	Shafter	
22	Tehachapi Railroad Depot	Tehachapi Railroad Depot	October 20, 1999 (#99001263)	101 W. Tehachapi Blvd. 35°07′58″N 118°27′06″W	Tehachapi	Burned down in 2008, currently being rebuilt to the original design specifications (with minor code-required alterations)
23	Tevis Block	Tevis Block	March 29, 1984 (#84000780)	1712 19th St. 35°22′36″N 119°01′14″W	Bakersfield	
24	Walker Pass	Walker Pass	October 15, 1966 (#66000210)	60 mi. NE of Bakersfield on CA 178; 35°39′47″N 118°01′37″W	Bakersfield	
25	Wasco Union High School Auditorium	Wasco Union High School Auditorium	September 30, 1997 (#97001188)	1900 Seventh St. 35°35′41″N 119°20′44″W	Wasco	
26	Weedpatch Camp	Weedpatch Camp	January 22, 1996 (#95001554)	8305 Sunset Blvd. 35°13′23″N 118°54′20″W	Bakersfield	
27	Woman's Club of Bakersfield		February 28, 2022 (#100007480)	1806 D St. (main entrance at 2030 18th St.); 35°22′32″N 119°01′33″W	Bakersfield	

== Former listing ==
	Name on the Register	Image	Date listed	Date removed	Location	City or town	Description
1	Ygnacio Valencia House		April 14, 1972 (#72001549)	1972	1020 High Street	Delano	Demolished.

== See also ==
- List of National Historic Landmarks in California
- National Register of Historic Places listings in California
- California Historical Landmarks in Kern County, California
