= Tevis Block =

- U.S. National Register of Historic Places
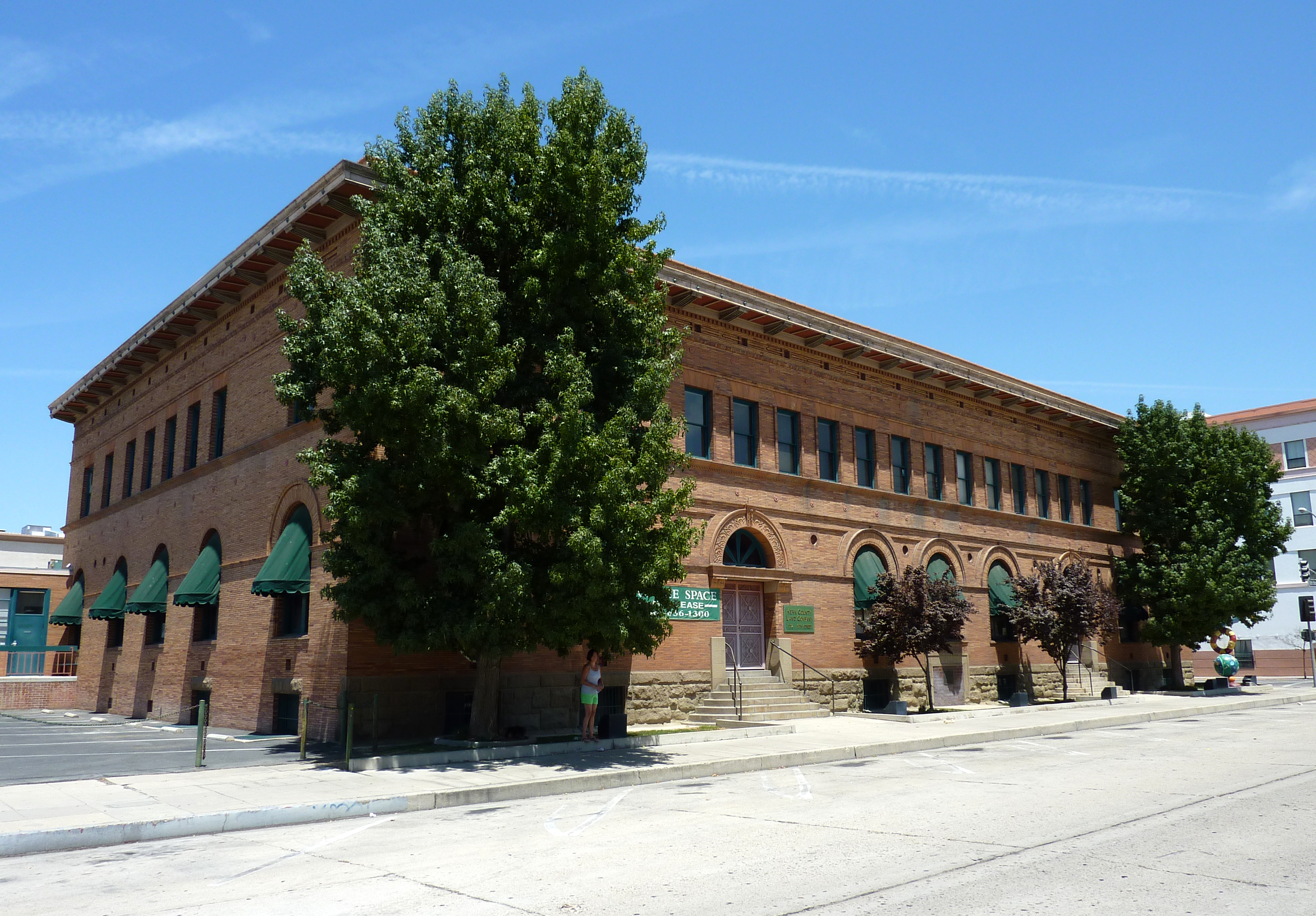

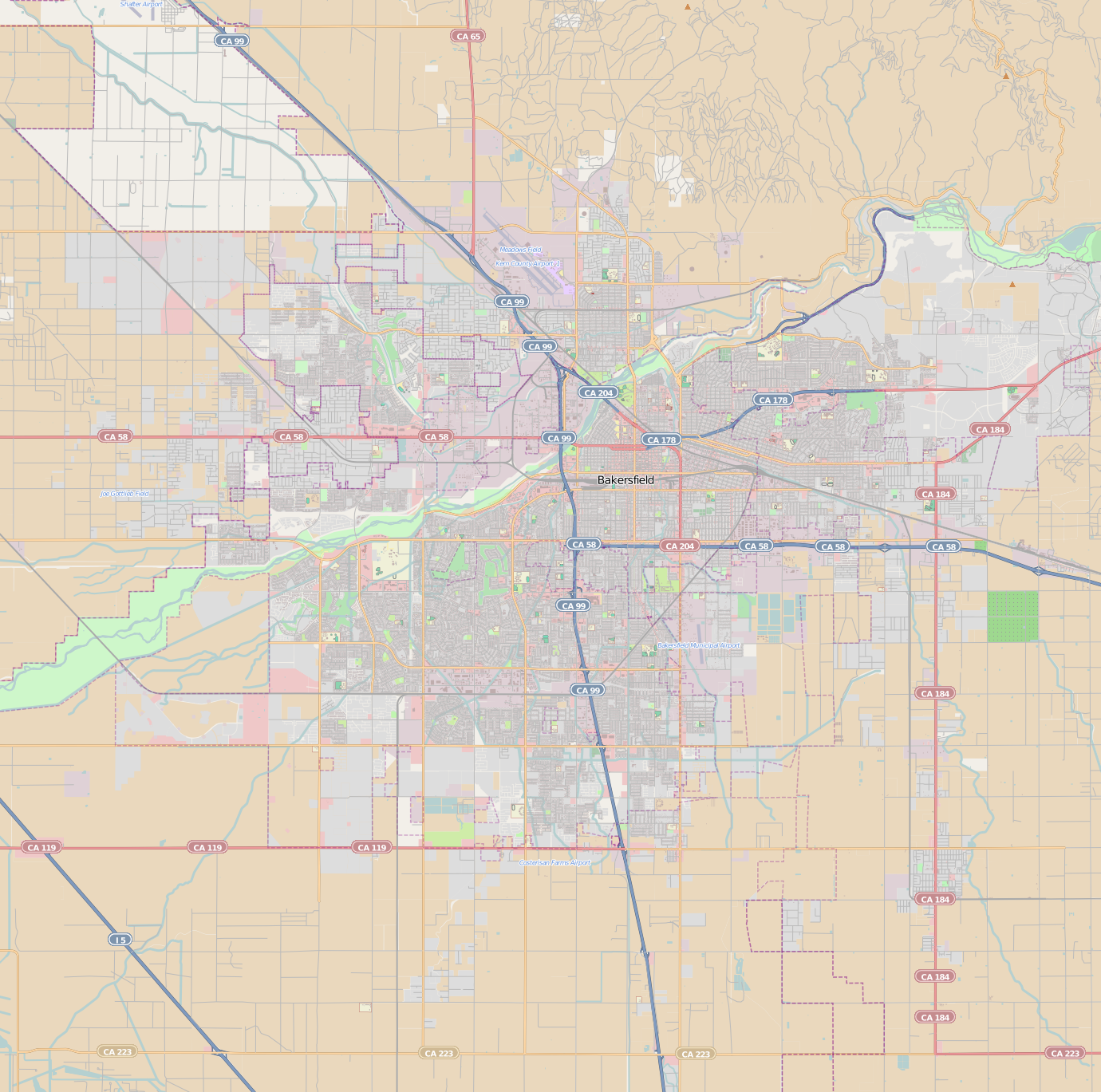
- Location within Bakersfield, California Location within California Location within the United States
- Location: 1712 19th St., Bakersfield, California
- Coordinates: 35°22′36″N 119°1′14″W
- Area: 0.4 acres (0.16 ha)
- Built: 1893
- Architect: Schultze, Henry A.
- Architectural style: Late 19th and 20th Century Revivals, Second Renaissance Revival
- NRHP reference No.: 84000780
- Added to NRHP: March 29, 1984

The Tevis Block, also known as the Kern County Land Company Building, is a historic office building in Bakersfield, California. The structure was placed on the National Register of Historic Places (NRHP) on March 29, 1984.

== Structure ==
The Tevis Block is a two-story, U-shaped structure constructed of imported fire brick. The front, south-facing facade has fanlight windows and terra cotta arches. Each floor is articulated differently and treated with a different order and finish. Basement windows are rectangular and bottom-hinged with a flat lintel. The first floor windows, two-sash and divided vertically with the fanlight transom, are enhanced by the brickwork to give the appearance of including mezzanine windows. The second-story windows are single-light sash with flat radiating bricks above. Atop the second-story windows is a narrow frieze with square vents topped by a decorated boxed cornice capped by a high plain cornice. The rear of the building includes an enclosed elevator, added later, and a second-story, iron-railed walkway. An additional one-story brick wing was added to the northwest corner of the building in later years.

== Significance ==
The Tevis Block is the final vestige of the Kern County Land Company. The company was formed in 1890 by James Haggin and his brother-in-law Lloyd Tevis and prospered in developing Kern County, California areas around the Kern River. The building helped open up the Bakersfield downtown west of H Street and became a landmark upon construction. It was one of only a handful of unreinforced masonry buildings to survive the 1952 Kern County earthquake, and was subsequently strengthened, renovated and restored to a close proximity of its original architecture. It is considered a fine example of Second Renaissance Revival architecture.

== See also ==
- California Historical Landmarks in Kern County, California
- National Register of Historic Places listings in Kern County, California
