= The Fort (Taft, California) =

- U.S. National Register of Historic Places
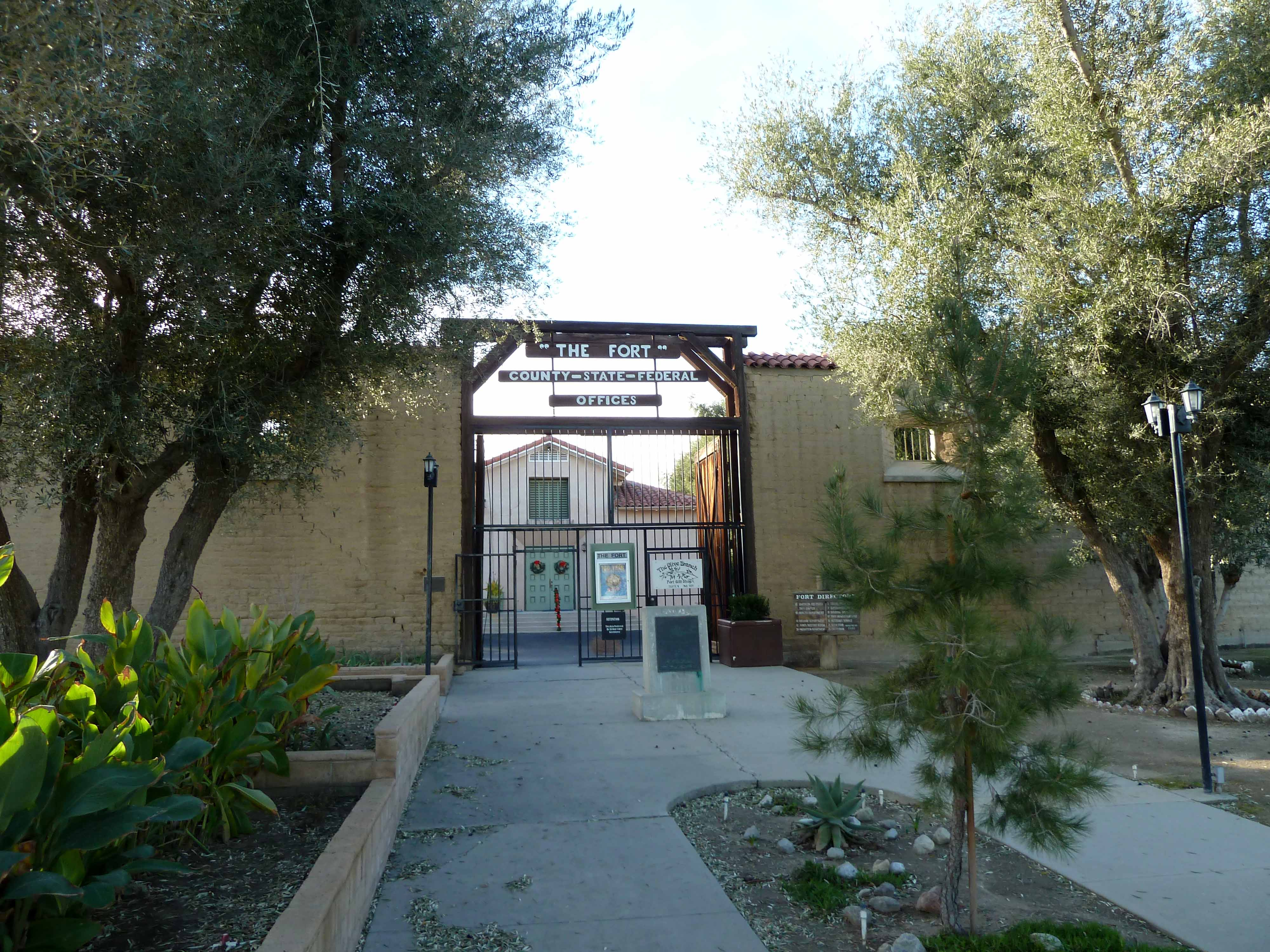

- Location within California Location within the United States
- Location: Ash and Lincoln Sts., Taft, California
- Coordinates: 35°9′2″N 119°27′54″W
- Area: 4.1 acres (1.7 ha)
- Built: 1938–40
- NRHP reference No.: 81000151
- Added to NRHP: July 22, 1981

The Fort is a government building located at the intersection of Ash and Lincoln Sts. in Taft, California. The building is a replica of Sutter's Fort in Sacramento. The property is surrounded by 14-foot (4.3 m) tall adobe walls with large wooden entrance gates; the interior has a main building surrounded by a courtyard and several smaller offices. The Fort was built by the Works Progress Administration from 1938 to 1940 and was one of the largest WPA buildings constructed in the San Joaquin Valley. The buildings at The Fort have been used for government offices at the federal, state, and local levels.

The Fort was added to the National Register of Historic Places on July 22, 1981.

== See also ==
- California Historical Landmarks in Kern County, California
- National Register of Historic Places listings in Kern County, California
