= Gilman/Paul station =

Muni Metro light rail station in San Francisco

Gilman/Paul
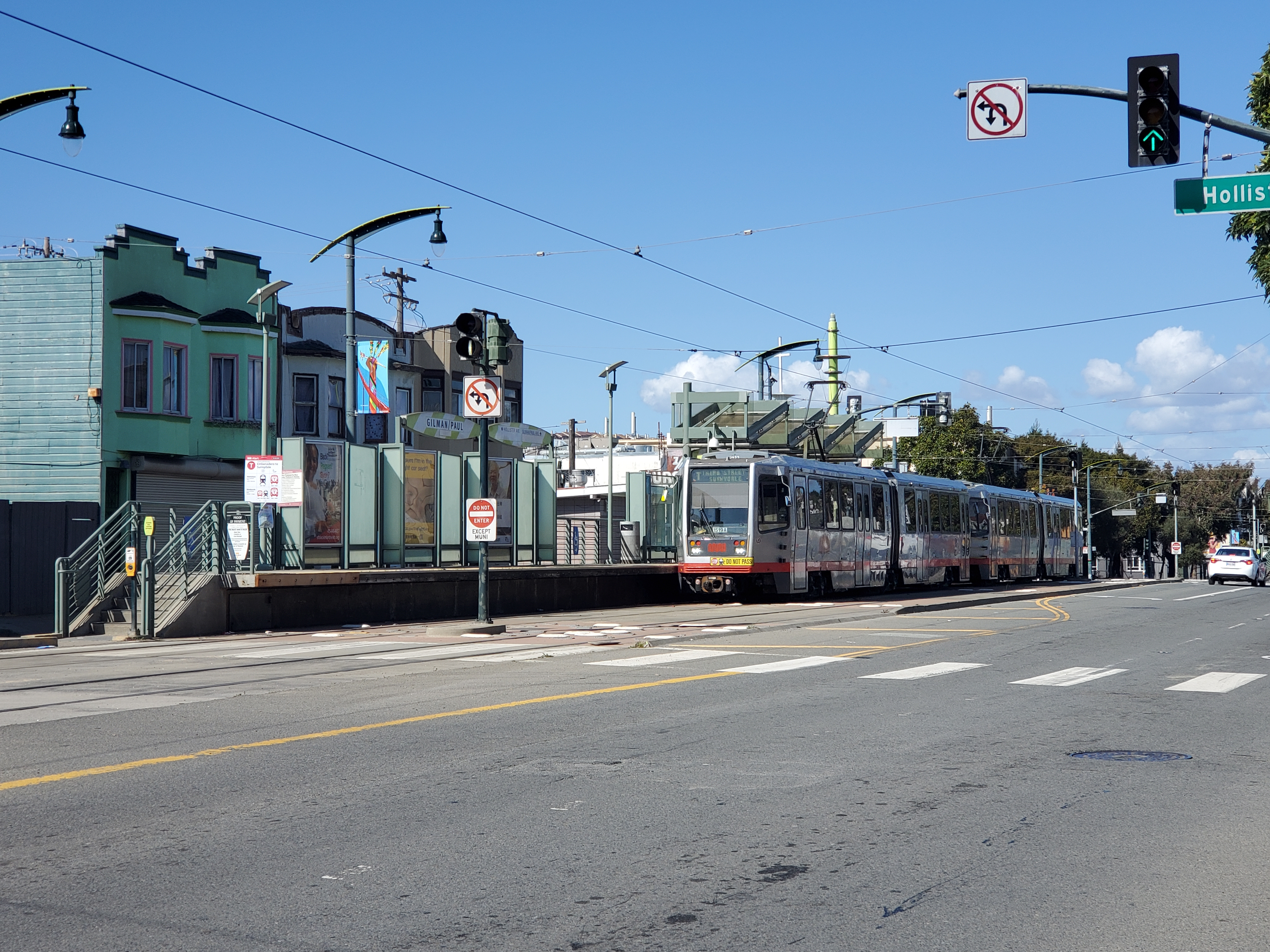
- A southbound train at Gilman/Paul station in March 2021

General information
- Location: Third Street at Gilman and Paul Avenues; San Francisco, California
- Coordinates: 37°43′21″N 122°23′44″W
- Platforms: 2 side platforms
- Tracks: 2
- Connections: Muni: 29

Construction
- Accessible: Yes

History
- Opened: January 13, 2007

Services
Preceding station	Muni	Following station
Carroll toward Chinatown	T Third Street	Le Conte toward Sunnydale
Location

Gilman/Paul station is a light rail station on the Muni Metro T Third Street line, located in the median of Third Street in the Bayview neighborhood of San Francisco, California. The station opened with the T Third Street line on January 13, 2007. It has two side platforms; the northbound platform is north of Gilman Avenue/Paul Avenue, and the southbound platform to the south, so that trains can pass through the intersection before the station stop.

The stop is also served by the route 29 bus, plus the T Bus and 91 Owl bus routes, which provide service along the T Third Street line during the early morning and late night hours respectively when trains do not operate.
