= First Baptist Church (Bakersfield, California) =

Historic church in California, United States

- U.S. National Register of Historic Places
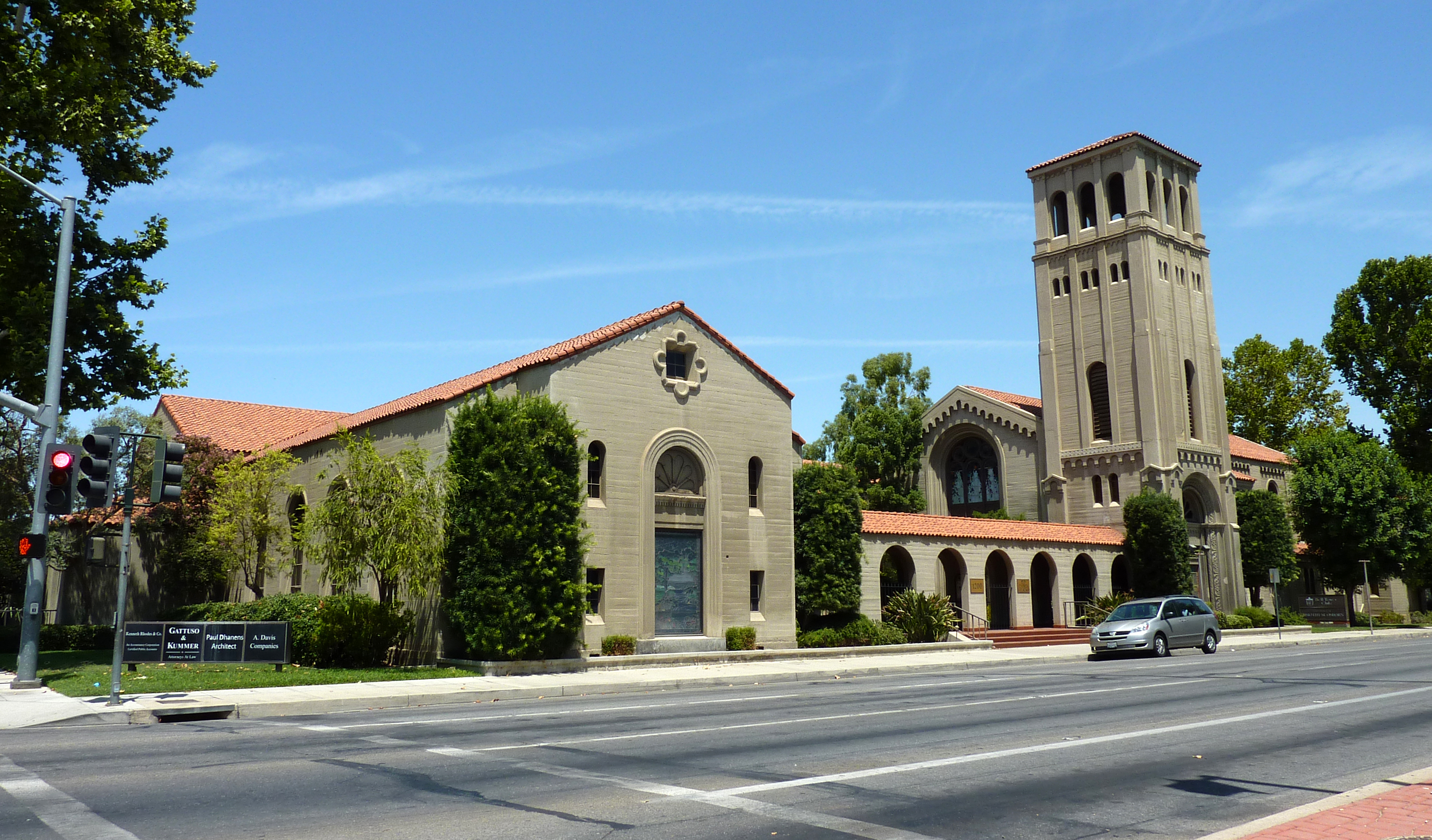

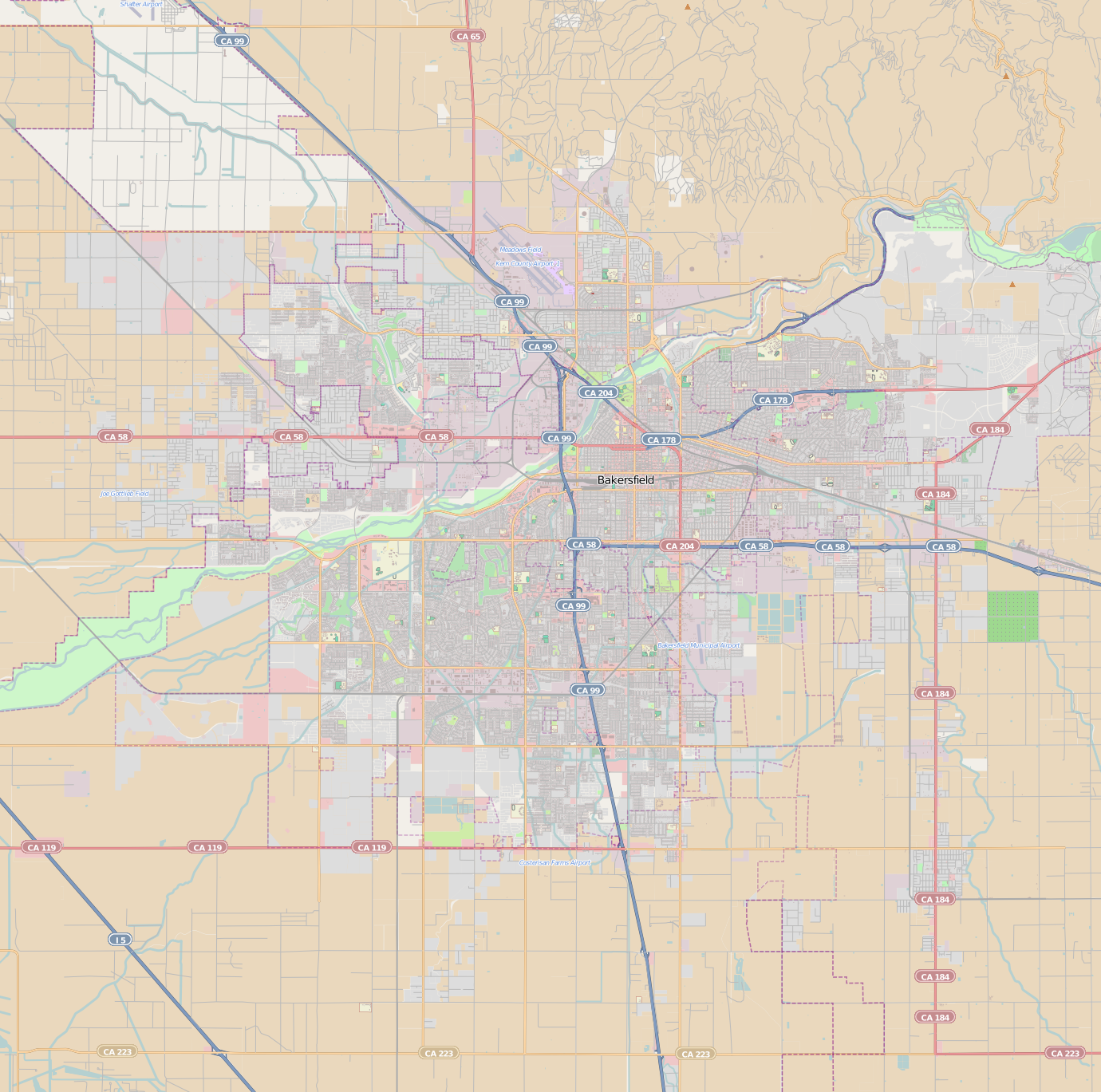
- Location within Bakersfield, California Location within California Location within the United States
- Location: 1200 Truxtun Ave., Bakersfield, California
- Coordinates: 35°22′26″N 119°0′54″W
- Area: 0.8 acres (0.32 ha)
- Built: 1931
- Architect: Charles H. Biggar
- Architectural style: Mission/Spanish Revival, Romanesque
- NRHP reference No.: 79000478
- Added to NRHP: January 2, 1979

The First Baptist Church, also known as the Bell Towers, is a historic church complex built in 1931 in Bakersfield, California. The church moved to a new campus in 1977 and the building presently used as an office building. The structure was placed on the National Register of Historic Places (NRHP) on January 2, 1979.

== Structure ==
Constructed in 1931, the structure was built of reinforced concrete, with the outside finish, simulating brick, created by a poured cast. Red, Spanish tile shingles cover the roof. A prominent, 70 foot (21 meter) bell tower stands in the center of the south facade, forming part of what was the vestibule and narthex of the church. The south side of the church also features large white oak doors with decorative arches above them. Blind arches and mullions rise to the roof level, giving the structure its Romanesque character. A single story arcade joins the wings of the building and surrounds a landscaped courtyard.

The southwest side of the complex is the original fellowship hall, built in a Mission Revival style. The structure is characterized by lofty arched windows on its west side; on its south side is a large arched window, originally a door, flanked by smaller arched windows. The old fellowship hall and church are connected by a two-story connecting building that continues the overall Mission Revival appearance.

== Significance ==
Located on a prominent spot in downtown Bakersfield, the First Baptist Church structure is considered one of the finest examples of a decorative concrete structure in the San Joaquin Valley and is a prominent landmark in Bakersfield. It is the only religious structure of its era to survive the 1952 Kern County earthquake that destroyed many of downtown Bakersfield's historic structures. It is also one of the few buildings in the area to remain relatively unaltered over the ensuing years.

== See also ==
- Bakersfield Register of Historic Places and Areas of Historic Interest
- California Historical Landmarks in Kern County, California
- National Register of Historic Places listings in Kern County, California
