= Carroll station =

Light rail station in San Francisco, California

Carroll
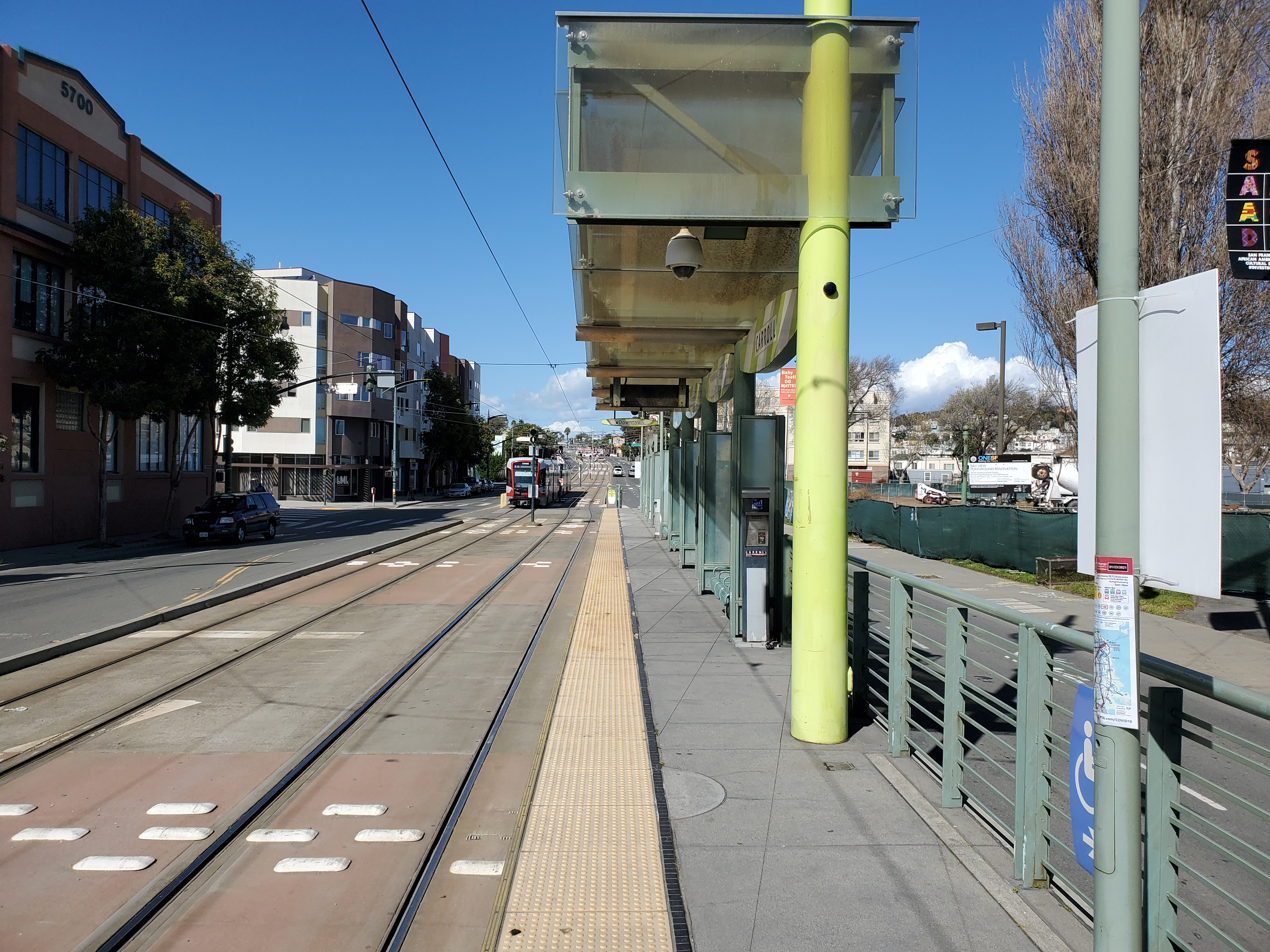
- The northbound platform at Carroll station in March 2021

General information
- Location: Third Street at Carroll Avenue; San Francisco, California
- Coordinates: 37°43′32″N 122°23′39″W
- Platforms: 2 side platforms
- Tracks: 2

Construction
- Cycle facilities: Bay Wheels station
- Accessible: Yes

History
- Opened: January 13, 2007

Services
| Preceding station | Muni | Following station |
|---|---|---|
| Williams toward Chinatown | T Third Street | Gilman/Paul toward Sunnydale |
Location

Carroll station is a light rail station on the Muni Metro T Third Street line, located in the median of Third Street in the Bayview neighborhood of San Francisco, California. The station opened with the T Third Street line on January 13, 2007. It has two side platforms; the northbound platform is north of Carroll Avenue, and the southbound platform south of Carroll Avenue, so that trains can pass through the intersection before the station stop.

The station is served by the T Bus and 91 Owl bus routes, which provide service along the T Third Street line during the early morning and late night hours respectively when trains do not operate.
