= Williams station (Muni Metro) =

Light rail station in San Francisco

Williams
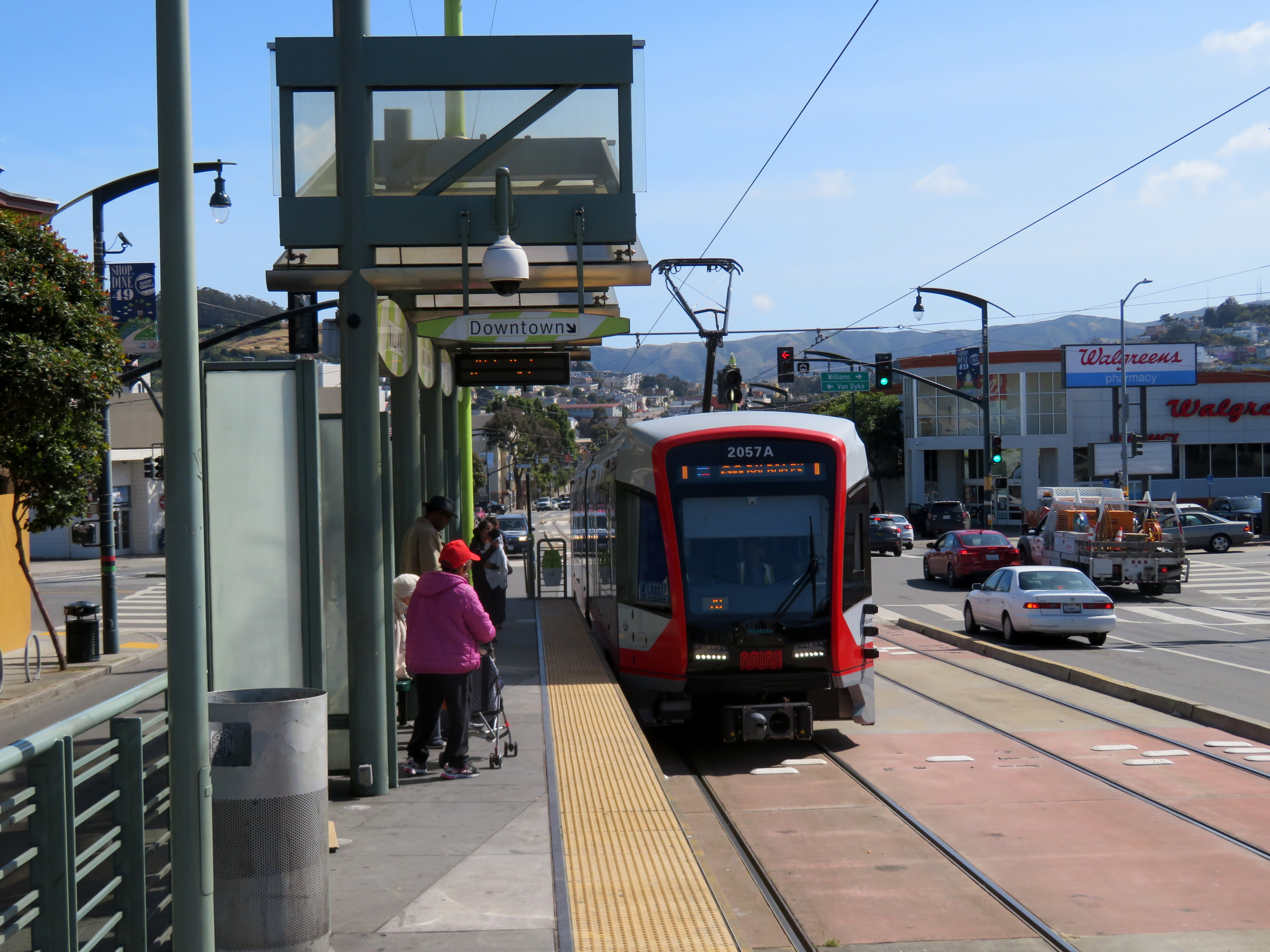
- A northbound train at Williams station in May 2019

General information
- Location: Third Street at Williams and Van Dyke Avenues; San Francisco, California
- Coordinates: 37°43′45″N 122°23′33″W
- Platforms: 2 side platforms
- Tracks: 2
- Connections: Muni: 54

Construction
- Cycle facilities: Bay Wheels station
- Accessible: Yes

History
- Opened: January 13, 2007

Services
| Preceding station | Muni | Following station |
|---|---|---|
| Revere/Shafter toward Chinatown | T Third Street | Carroll toward Sunnydale |
Location

Williams station is a light rail station of the San Francisco Municipal Railway's Muni Metro system located in the median of Third Street at Williams and Van Dyke Avenues in Bayview, San Francisco, California, United States. The station opened along with the T Third Street line on January 13, 2007. It has two side platforms; the northbound platform is north of Williams Avenue, and the southbound platform south of Williams Avenue, so that trains can pass through the intersection before the station stop. A wye for trains to reverse directions is located two blocks south at Armstrong Avenue, allowing Williams station to be the terminus of short turn trains when necessary.

The stop is also served by the route 54 bus, plus the T Bus and 91 Owl bus routes, which provide service along the T Third Street line during the early morning and late night hours respectively when trains do not operate.
