= Shafter Research Station =

- U.S. National Register of Historic Places
- U.S. Historic district
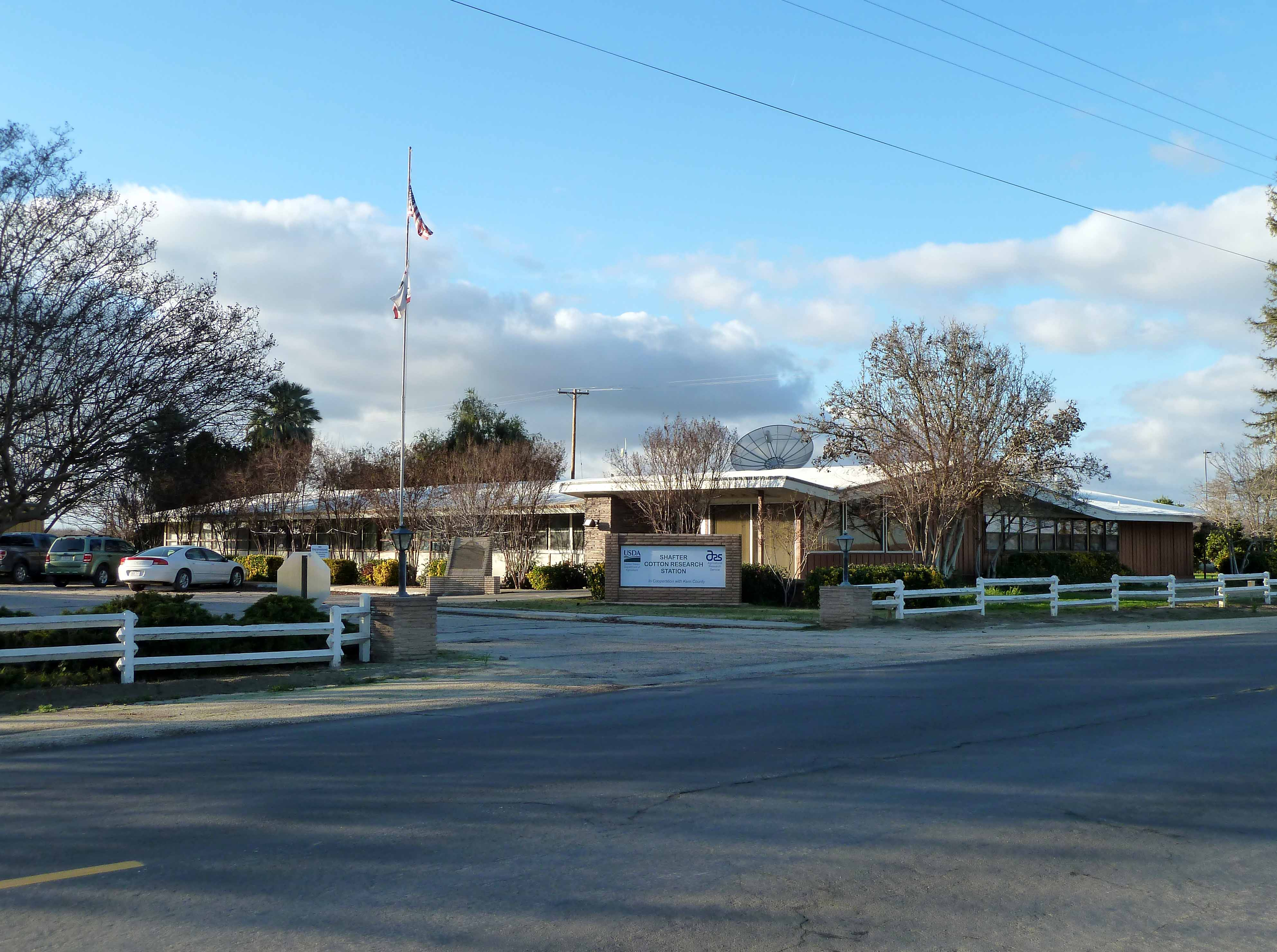

- Location within California Location within the United States
- Nearest city: Shafter, California
- Coordinates: 35°31′52″N 119°16′41″W
- Area: 17.5 acres (7.1 ha)
- Built: 1922
- NRHP reference No.: 97001211
- Added to NRHP: October 17, 1997

Shafter Cotton Research Station
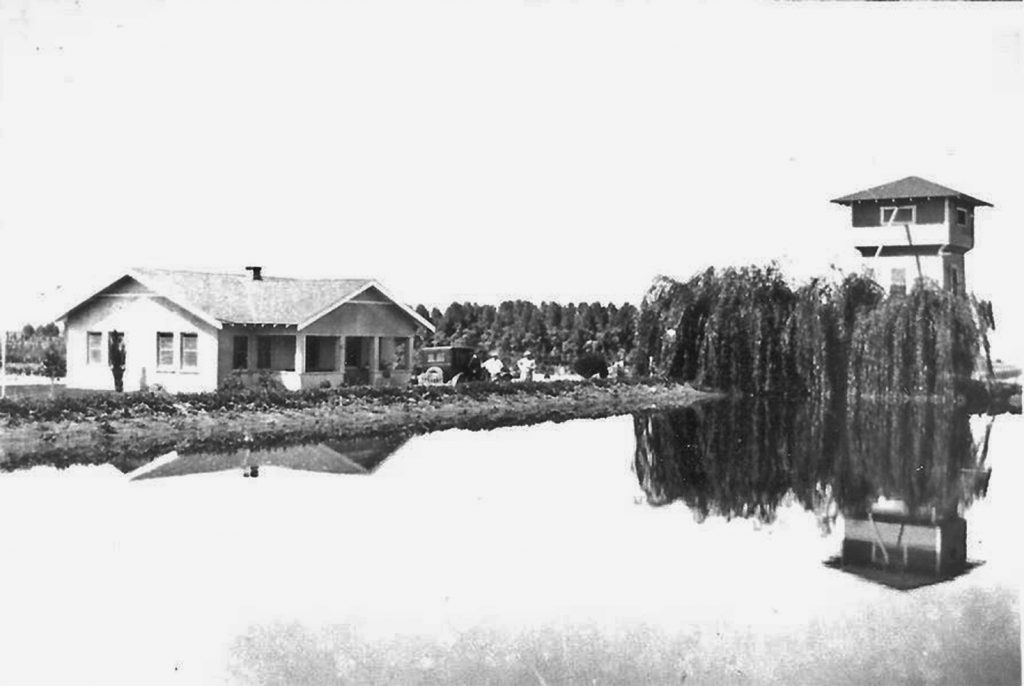
- Shafter Cotton Research Station in 1922
- Interactive map of Shafter Cotton Research Station
- Location: 17053 Shafter Avenue, Shafter, Kern County, California

History
- Built: 1922

California Historical Landmark
- Official name: Shafter Cotton Research Station
- Designated: March 3, 1997
- Reference no.: 1022

Shafter Research Station is an agricultural research station near Shafter, Kern County, California, in the San Joaquin Valley.

The station was established in 1922 by the U.S. Department of Agriculture (USDA) as Shafter Cotton Research Station. It was built to provide California with high-quality cotton. Initial research at the station focused on growing long-staple cotton, Egyptian Pima cotton, which was used to make airplane wings at the time. The Hatch Act of 1887 provided for U.S. funding of agricultural science.

By 1925, the researchers had determined that Acala cotton, named after Acala, Texas, was the highest-quality variety of long-staple cotton; they then developed the "one variety" method of cotton production, in which every California cotton producer would grow Acala cotton. As a result of this research, the state of California enacted the California One Variety Cotton Act, which mandated that California cotton producers could grow only Acala cotton. The law spurred the growth of California's fledgling cotton industry, which now forms a major part of the state's agricultural economy. The success of the "one variety" policy caused the station to earn an international reputation for its research, and procedures developed at the station have been used in the Australian and Israeli cotton industries.

The Shafter Cotton Research Station changed from a USDA research station to a private one in June 2012. The San Joaquin Valley Quality Cotton Growers Association now runs the facility. With this change, the former Shafter Cotton Research Station now works other crops, including orchard crops. Today the facility consists of a 20-acre campus, 20 buildings and 60 acres of experimental crops.

The Shafter Research Station was made a California Historical Landmark (#1022) on March 3, 1997, and was added to the National Register of Historic Places on October 17, 1997.

- The California Historical Landmark plaque reads:

NO. 1022 SHAFTER COTTON RESEARCH STATION - The Shafter Cotton Research Station, established here in 1922 by the U.S. Department of Agriculture, developed the "Acala" varieties which were exceptionally well suited to the San Joaquin Valley. The quality of the Acala cottons and the marketing advantage of the one variety cotton district, created in 1925, resulted in premium cottons with a world-wide demand. Through the continued vision and cooperative efforts of growers and researchers, production of Acala cotton became one of California's largest agricultural enterprises.

== See also ==
- California Historical Landmarks in Kern County, California
- National Register of Historic Places listings in Kern County, California
