= Kern County Museum =

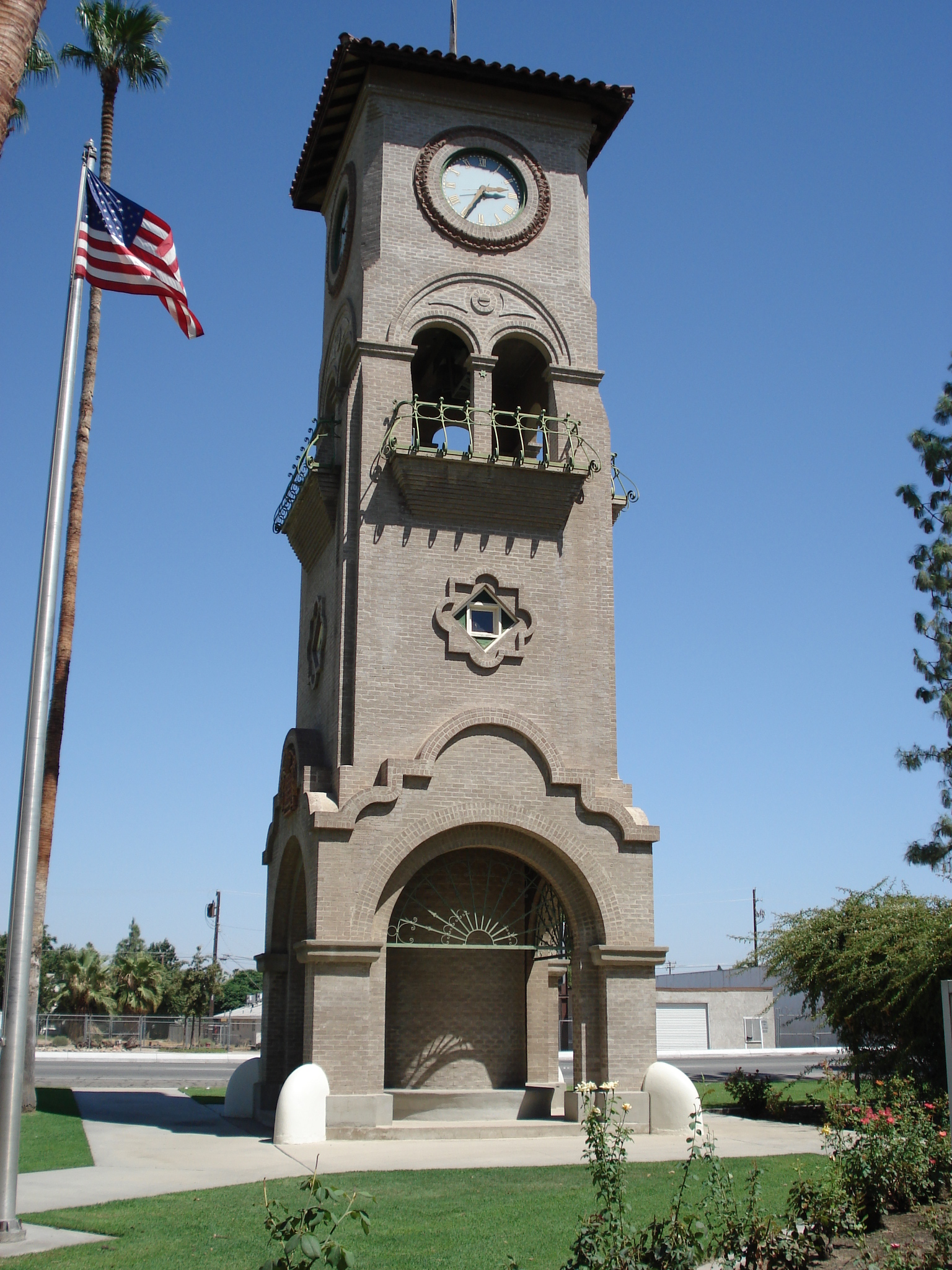
- Beale Memorial Clock Tower at Kern County Museum
- Established: 1941
- Location: Bakersfield, California
- Coordinates: 35.393°N 119.020°W
- Type: History museum
- Collection size: 1 million+
- Visitors: 85,000
- Public transit access: GET Rt. 2 (Oildale)
- Website: kerncountymuseum.org/

The Kern County Museum is a history museum located in Bakersfield, California. Its main focus is the history of Kern County. Pioneer Village, located on 16 acres (65,000 m^{2}), contains over 50 original buildings from around the county, related to life in the late 19th century. Other features include: Lori Brock Children's Discovery Center, Black Gold exhibit, and Neon Plaza. The museum is accredited by the American Alliance of Museums.

One of the most recognizable structures at the museum is the Beale Memorial Clock Tower, located on the lawn in front of it. The clock tower was originally constructed in 1904 in the center of the intersection of 17th St. and Chester Ave. It was destroyed in the 1952 earthquake and rebuilt at this site in 1964.

== History ==
In 1929, a letter in the local newspaper from the local Lions Club asked for historical documents, photos, and information related to Kern County's past. Thousands of pieces of information were donated to the Kern County Chamber of Commerce in response.

In 1941, by a decree from the county, the Kern County Museum was founded. However, the outbreak of World War II delayed the opening until 1945. It was placed in a small corner of the Kern County Chamber of Commerce Building located on Chester Ave, next to the fairgrounds between the Kern River and Garces Circle. The popularity of the exhibit quickly grew, as well as the amount of space needed to showcase it. By 1952, the museum had grown large enough that the Chamber of Commerce used the entire structure for the museum.

The museum continued to grow. The old fairgrounds adjacent to it (the fairgrounds moved to its current location in South Bakersfield on Union Ave) became the site for Pioneer Village. Later, there were other additions to the museum, which included Lori Brock Children's Discovery Center, and Black Gold exhibit.

The museum is a member of the North American Reciprocal Museums program.

== Exhibits ==
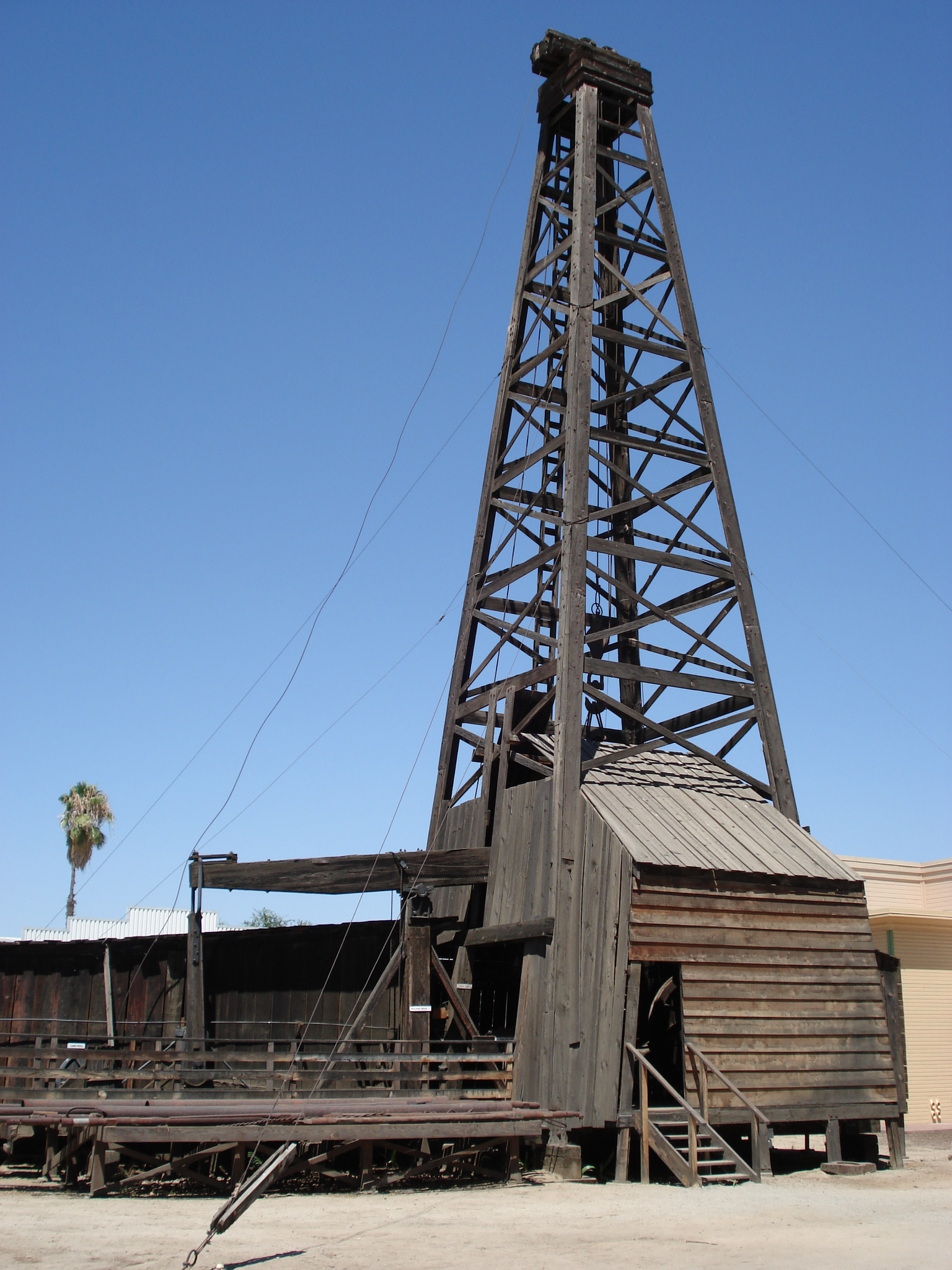
Oil derrick at Kern County Museum

=== Pioneer Village ===
Pioneer Village is a collection of over 50 historic building related to Kern County's history. The various buildings are from all around the county. There is almost one of every type of building from the time period, including: one room schoolhouse, church, photography studio, train station, hotel, courthouse, and assay office. Oil equipment, including a wooden oil derrick, as well as a pumping unit (with 6 wooden pumps) are located in the village. The buildings are arranged to simulate an actual town. Also in the collection are assorted neon signs, which were collected from around the county. Those signs are being restored and put on display.

=== Black Gold ===
Black Gold is an exhibit which describes Kern County's oil industry. It was created in 2002, and occupies 9,640 square feet (896 m^{2}) with an additional 2.3 acres (9,300 m^{2}) surrounding the exhibit. According to the museums website, some the highlights include, “simulated travel under the sea in a diving bell to learn how oil is formed, an exploration into oil discovery, recovery and its transformation into many products we use today, and the many dangers of asphaltum mining straight from the mouth of an old-timer.”

=== Neon Plaza ===
In recent years, neon signs for the county's now-defunct historic eateries, retail stores and service shops were restored for display in Neon Plaza. The outdoor location is used for company gatherings, private parties, nonprofit fundraisers and other galas.

=== Other exhibits ===
The main building contains rotating exhibits. It is housed in the old Chamber of Commerce building built in 1929. It is the only historic building original to its location; all others were moved later (although the Beale Memorial Clock Tower was rebuilt in front of the museum in 1964). Currently the museum has over one million objects. Most are rotated through the building according to theme.

The Lori Brock Children's Discovery Center is a children's museum located on the grounds of the Kern County Museum. It was opened in 1976 and was designed to offer hands-on experiences for children. Like the main building, its exhibits also rotate. The center has three exhibit rooms, each one showcasing a different exhibit.
