= Long Canyon Village Site =

Archaeological site in California, United States

- U.S. National Register of Historic Places
- Nearest city: South Lake, California
- Area: 50 acres (20 ha)
- NRHP reference No.: 80000803
- Added to NRHP: April 14, 1980

The Long Canyon Village Site is an archaeological site located on the South Fork Kern River in Kern County, California, near the community of South Lake. The village was inhabited by the Tübatulabal people, who used the site as a winter home, until a point between 1780 and 1820. Archaeologists discovered the site in 1948–49. Investigations at the site have found the remnants of homes and granaries.

The site was added to the National Register of Historic Places on April 14, 1980.
