= Revere/Shafter station =

Light rail station in San Francisco

Revere/Shafter
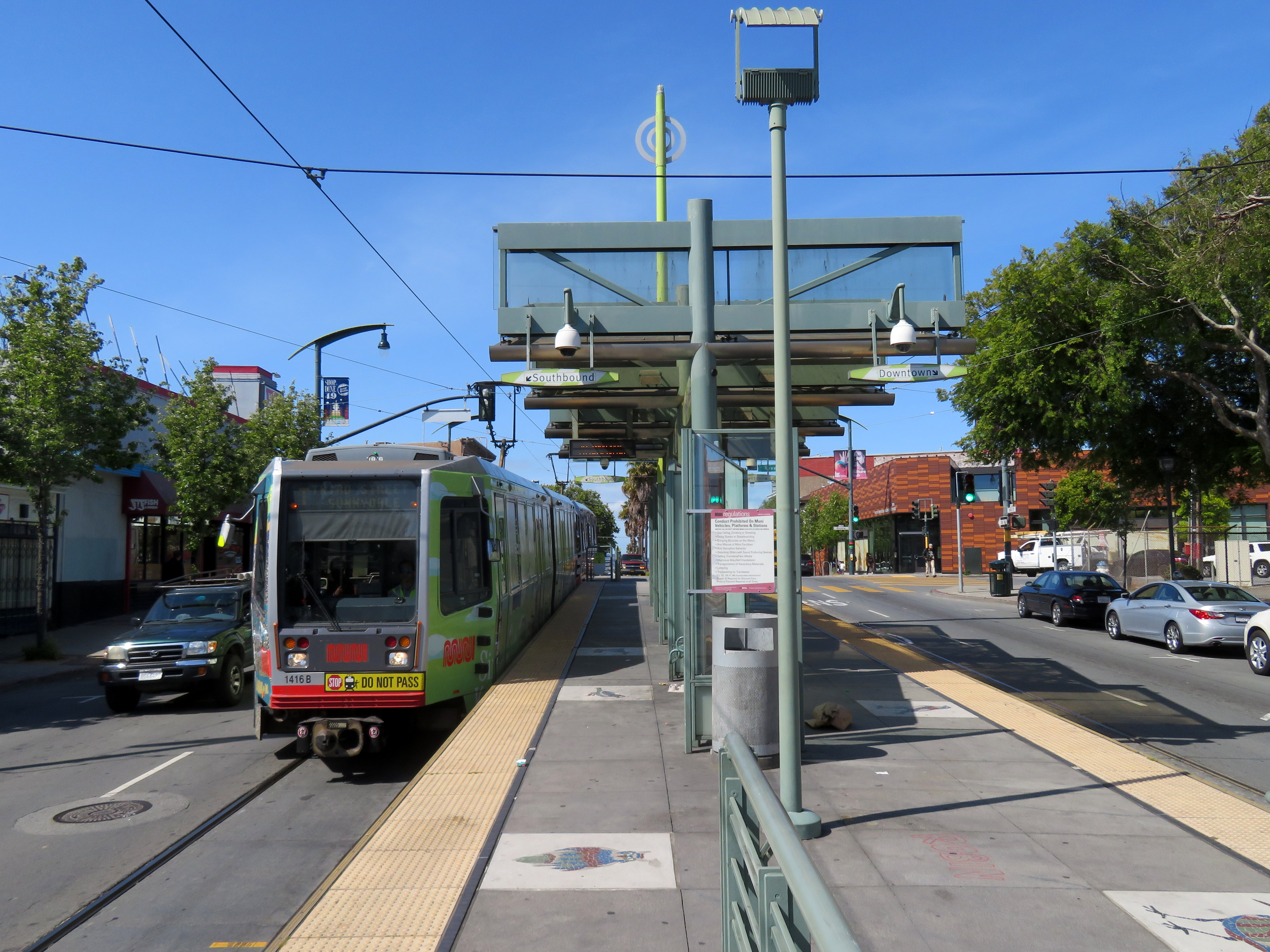
- A southbound train at Revere/Shafter station in 2019

General information
- Location: Third Street between Revere and Shafter Avenues; San Francisco, California
- Coordinates: 37°43′56.26″N 122°23′29.38″W
- Platforms: 1 island platform
- Tracks: 2
- Connections: Muni: 54

Construction
- Accessible: Yes

History
- Opened: January 13, 2007

Services
Preceding station	Muni	Following station
Oakdale/Palou toward Chinatown	T Third Street	Williams toward Sunnydale
Location

Revere/Shafter station is a light rail station on the Muni Metro T Third Street line in the Bayview neighborhood of San Francisco, California. The station opened with the T Third Street line on January 13, 2007. It has a single island platform located in the median of Third Street between Revere Avenue and Shafter Avenue, with access from crosswalks at both streets.

The stop is also served by the route 54 bus, plus the T Bus and 91 Owl bus routes, which provide service along the T Third Street line during the early morning and late night hours respectively when trains do not operate.
