= Unreinforced masonry building =

Type of building

An unreinforced masonry building (or UMB, URM building) is a type of building where load bearing walls, non-load bearing walls or other structures, such as chimneys, are made of brick, cinderblock, tiles, adobe or other masonry material that is not braced by reinforcing material, such as rebar in a concrete or cinderblock. The term is used in earthquake engineering as a classification of certain structures for earthquake safety purposes, and is subject to minor variation from place to place.

== Overview ==
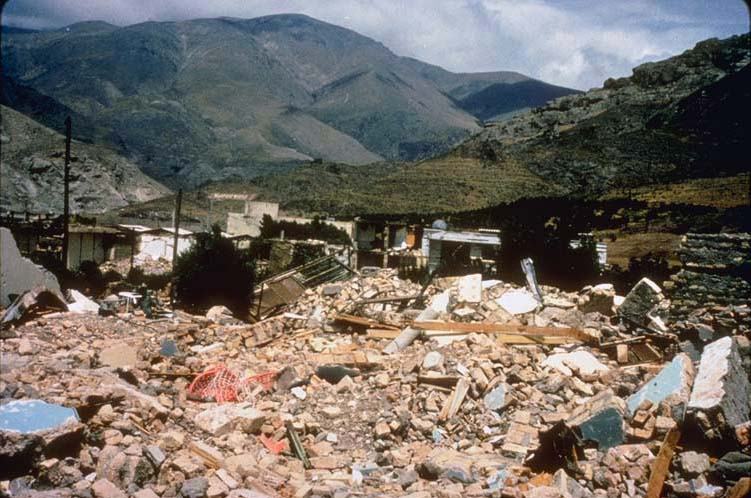
UMBs destroyed by the 1990 Manjil–Rudbar earthquake in Iran.

URM structures are vulnerable to collapse in an earthquake. One problem is that most mortar used to hold bricks together is not strong enough to survive the vibrations without cracking. Additionally, masonry elements may "peel" from the building, and fall onto occupants or passersby outside.

=== United States ===
In California, the 1933 Long Beach earthquake resulted in a near-immediate statewide ban on construction of new unreinforced masonry school buildings and the Field Act. A State law enacted in 1986 required seismic retrofitting of existing structures. Retrofits are relatively expensive, and may include the building being tied to its foundation, tying building elements (such as roof and walls) to each other so that the building moves as a single unit rather than creating internal shears during an earthquake, attaching walls more securely to underlying supports so that they do not buckle and collapse, and bracing or removing parapets and other unsecured decorative elements. Retrofits are generally intended to prevent injury and death to people, but not to protect the building itself. According to the 2006-04 California seismic safety commission report, there are still 7800 URM buildings with no retrofitting in the state, including 1100 in the city of Los Angeles.

The California law left implementation and standards up to local jurisdictions. Compliance took many years, and as of 2008, most (but not all) of the unreinforced masonry buildings in San Francisco have undergone retrofitting.

There is particular cause for concern in eathquake-prone regions. Such regions may not have regulations limiting the construction of UMBs, or have only implemented them recently. Public awareness of earthquake safety may be low. For example, the Wasatch Fault in the U.S. state of Utah closely parallels the state's most populous metropolitan area, the Wasatch Front (which includes the state capital Salt Lake City). The Wasatch Front has a population of 2 million, and contains 200,000 UMBs compared with the entire state of California's 25,000. Utah has recently retrofitted many public UMBs to better withstand earthquakes, but most UMBs in the state are private homes.

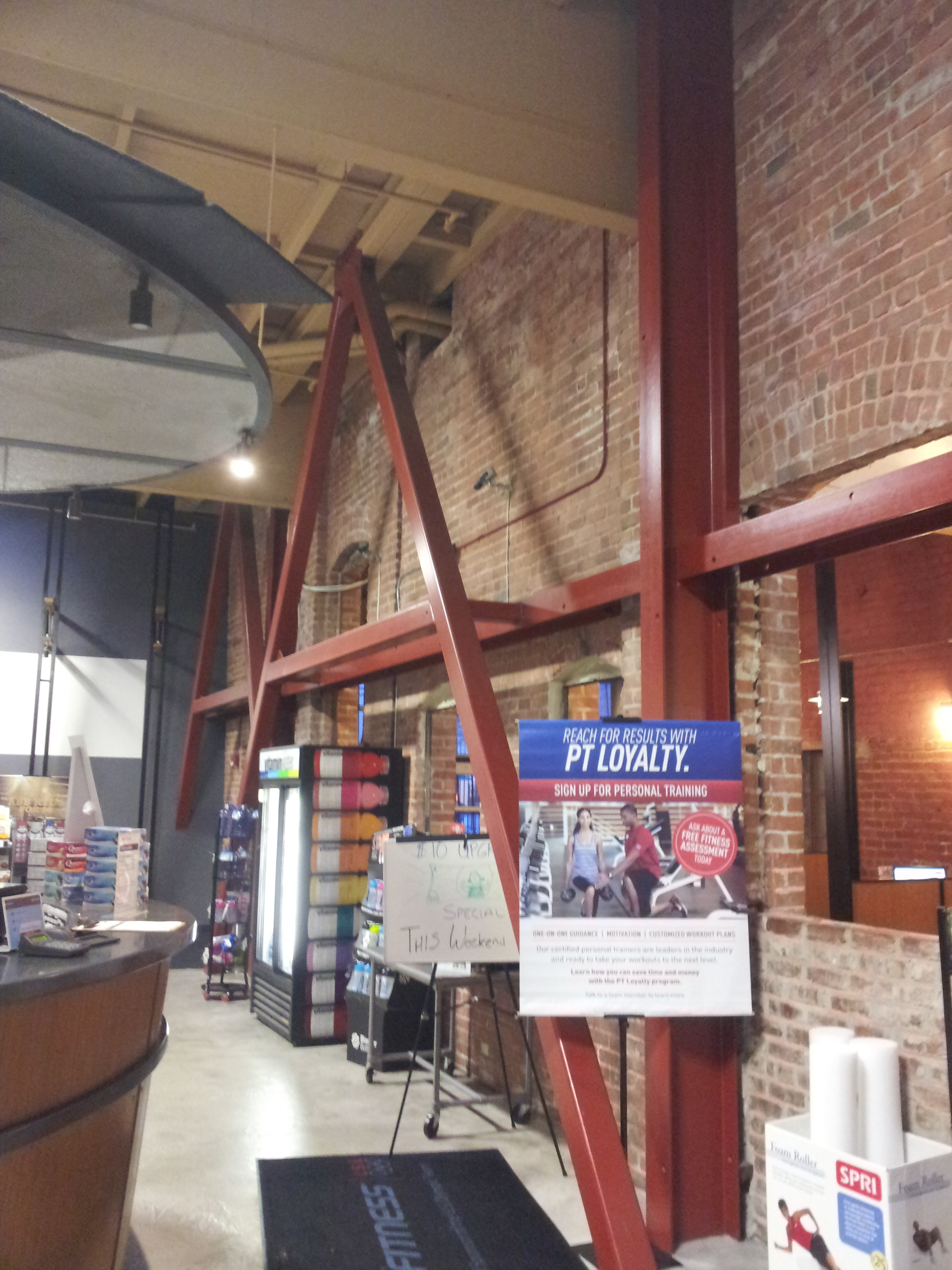
Steel braced frame added to an unreinforced masonry bearing-wall building as a seismic retrofit, Petaluma, California

=== Haiti ===
The lack of earthquake codes preventing the construction of UMBs was a major factor in the high death toll in the 2010 Haiti earthquake.

== See also ==
- Structural engineering
