= Transportation in Kern County, California =

Kern County’s transportation system was quoted as the “unseen industry.” Located at the southern end of the San Joaquin Valley, the county is at a prime location to ship goods west to the central coast, south to ports in Los Angeles, and east to corridors that connect to the rest of the country. It is also on major corridors that link to all northern points.

State Routes in Kern County.

== Intercity highways ==
Kern County is served by a large network of highways, expressways and freeways. It is easier to break the network down into three categories: primary, alternate, and local. It is also easier to view Bakersfield as the center of the transportation network, and the routes traveling away from that point. They are listed below, with the names either officially designated by the state, or commonly used by local authorities and Caltrans.

Primary routes are the mainline highways connecting Bakersfield with major destinations and other major transportation infrastructure. Alternate routes are other routes that connect major destinations and other major transportation infrastructure, but do not require travel on the primary route. The exception is SR 58 (Mojave Freeway), which is a primary route and part of the alternate route to I-5 (Golden State Freeway). The reason is SR 58 and SR 14 are both mostly freeways and are capable of handling large semi-trucks. Local routes are the remaining state routes. They primarily connect local roads and rural communities to primary and alternate routes.

Although Kern County is located at the center of an important interstate highway system, it is only served by one interstate (I-5). Ironically this interstate bypasses many important transportation hubs and connectors in the valley, currently served by state routes (SR 99 and SR 58). This includes the two largest cities not served by an interstate, which are Fresno and Bakersfield. Efforts have been made for inclusion of the other two routes into the interstate system. SR 99 has been designated a NHS future interstate, which would either be number I-7 or I-9. Currently Caltrans and the Federal Highway Administration are negotiating what needs to be upgraded to conform to interstate standards. SR 58 is currently being converted to a freeway, but has not been submitted for future interstate status. If adopted, it would be an extension of I-40 which currently terminates in Barstow, CA. Currently about 65% of truck traffic which use the route does cross the California state line.

=== Primary ===
* denotes freeway

- Westside Freeway* - north to San Francisco/Sacramento/California state line
- Golden State Freeway* - north to Fresno/Sacramento, south to Los Angeles
- State Route 41 - north to Fresno/Yosemite, south to Central Coast
- Paso Robles Highway - west to Central Coast
- Mojave Freeway/Westside Parkway* - east to I-15/I-40 in Barstow

Note: The Mojave Freeway (State Route 58) should not be confused with Interstate 15. In Kern County, The Mojave Freeway name is used by local authorities and Caltrans to refer to SR 58 between Bakersfield and Barstow. The California Legislator gave the same name to the Barstow Freeway (I-15) between San Bernardino and the Nevada state line.

=== Alternate ===
* denotes freeway

- Antelope Valley Freeway/Mojave Freeway* - alt. to I-5 (Golden State Freeway) south
- Westside Highway - alt. to I-5 (Westside Freeway/Golden State Freeway) north and south
- Central Valley Highway - alt. to SR 99 (Golden State Freeway) north
- Porterville Highway - alt. to SR 99 (Golden State Freeway) north
- Taft Highway/Cuyama Highway - alt. to SR 46 (Paso Robles Highway) west

Note: There is a gap in the primary/alternate route network. SR 178 should be the alternate route to SR 58. However, there is currently an approximately 14-mile gap in the highway in Kern, San Bernardino, and Inyo counties. Since the detour route is about 100 miles, and requires travel on SR 58, the route can not be considered an alternate route.

=== Local ===
- Midland Trail
- McKittrick Highway
- Garces Highway
- Maricopa Highway
- Kern Canyon Road
- Weedpatch Highway
- Valley Boulevard
- Golden State Highway
- Bear Mountain Boulevard
- Three Flags Highway

== Intercity rail ==
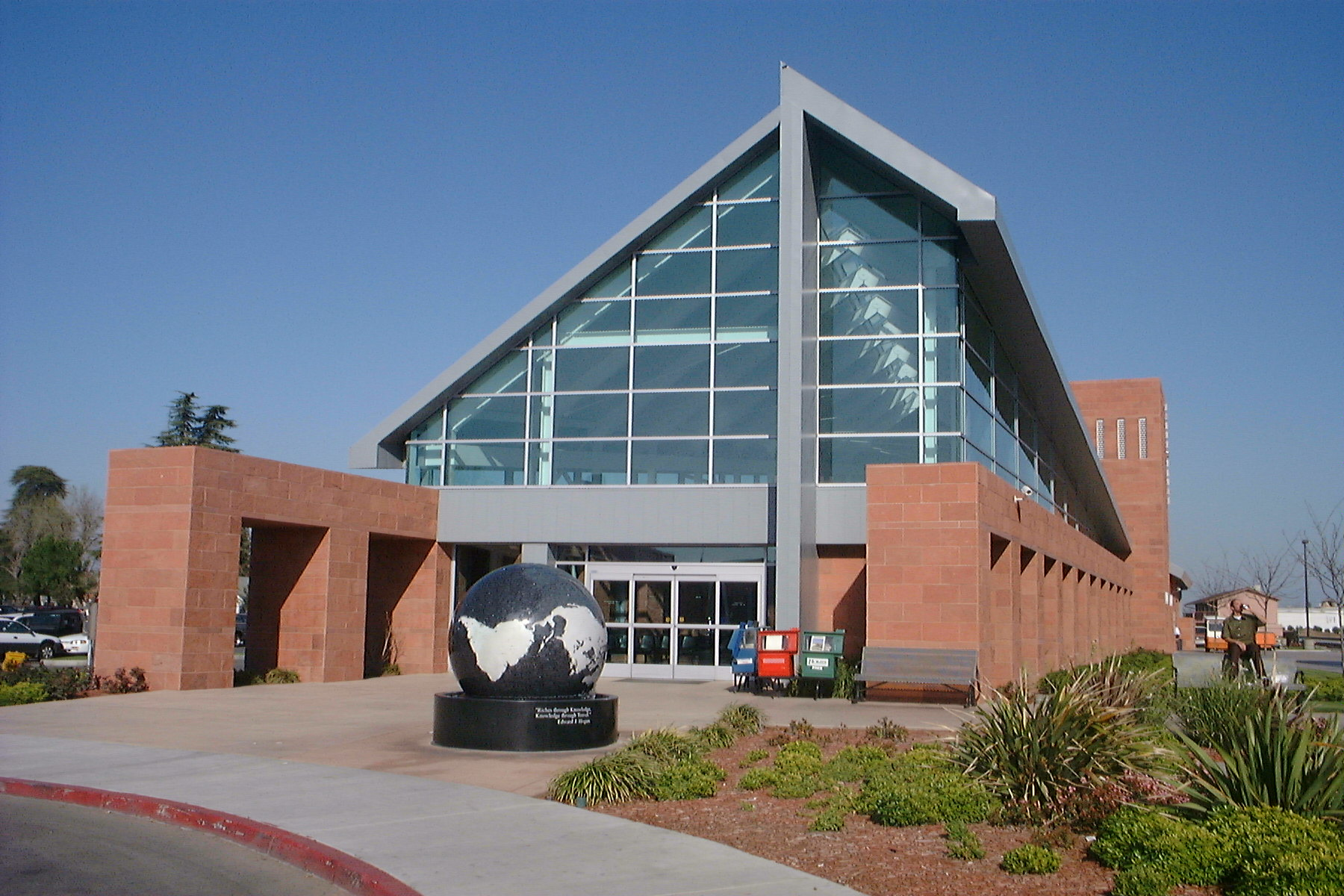
Bakersfield Amtrak Station in downtown

Kern County is served by Union Pacific and BNSF; both are class-1 railroads. Both railroads parallel each other north of Bakersfield through the San Joaquin Valley. Within the county, Union Pacific follows SR 99, while BNSF follows SR 43. The distance between the two railroads average about 16 miles. South of Bakersfield, both railroads must use the route over the Tehachapi Mountains. This route is owned by Union Pacific, but BNSF has trackage rights over it. This segment is the busiest single line route in the world.

Regional service is provided by the San Joaquin Valley Railroad, which was purchased by RailAmerica. It provides service between Bakersfield and agricultural centers of Arvin, Buttonwillow, and Lamont. At one time, a railroad line connected Bakersfield and the oil rich City of Taft, known as the Sunset Railway. However, the construction of oil pipelines and equipment being hauled by trucks resulted in the removal of the route.

Passenger service is provided exclusively by the Gold Runner, run by Amtrak California. North of Bakersfield the train uses the BNSF route through the valley. The line terminates in Bakersfield, where passengers transfer to one of five Amtrak Thruway bus routes. They travel to, among other places, the Central Coast, Los Angeles Basin (with connections to other trains at Los Angeles Union Station), Mojave Desert, Las Vegas, Nevada, and Palm Springs, California. High level of demand through the Tehachapi Pass has prevented any rail service from extending south of Bakersfield.

California High-Speed Rail plans to have a station in Bakersfield, which will serve the southern San Joaquin Valley region. This project will link Kern County with Los Angeles, San Francisco, Sacramento, and San Diego by high-speed trains. The desert communities in eastern Kern County will be served by the Palmdale station in Los Angeles County.

== Air transportation ==
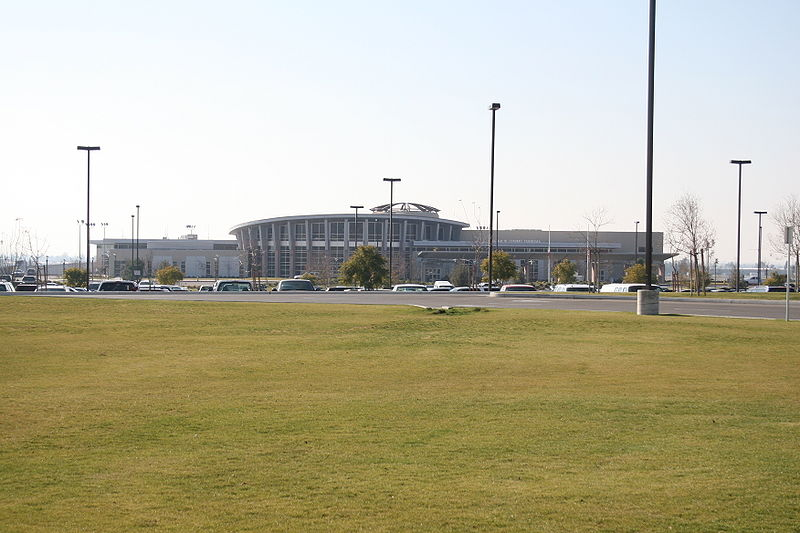
Meadows Field

The primary airport used for the transportation of passengers and goods is Meadows Field in Bakersfield. Several industrial complexes are located around the airport for easy transportation of goods from warehouses to airplanes. More industrial complexes are planned in the future.

Passenger travel is relatively light at the airport. Domestic flights are run out of the William M. Thomas Terminal, constructed in 2006. There is also an international terminal located at the old terminal building. Originally flights were flown between Bakersfield and Mexico; however, the terminal closed when the air carrier discontinued service.

In addition to Meadows Field, there are a multitude of regional airports throughout the county. Most notably is Mojave Air and Spaceport. This is the only civilian spaceport in the nation. Spaceship One, the first civilian reusable spaceship, was launched from there. Several companies based out of Mojave are currently developing private spaceships from the airport, including the successor to Spaceship One, logically called Spaceship Two.

== Bus transportation ==
Regional transportation is provided by Kern Regional Transit. It connects Bakersfield with the different regions of Kern County. These are western San Joaquin Valley, eastern San Joaquin Valley, Mojave Desert, Kern River Valley, and Tejon mountain region. In addition, regional service is provided within the Kern River Valley, Mojave Desert, and Tejon mountain region. Within Bakersfield, primary hubs are located at the Bakersfield Amtrak station and the GET (Golden Empire Transit) downtown transit center.

Amtrak Thruway buses provide daily connections to Los Angeles Union Station.

In addition, Taft Area Transit (TAT) provides regional service between Maricopa and Taft. It also provides local service throughout the city of Taft on two routes.

Other bus operators include:

- Arvin Transit is the local municipal bus operator in and around Arvin.
- Delano Area Rapid Transit is the local municipal bus operator in Delano.
- Golden Empire Transit is the local bus operator in and near Bakersfield.

Private regional bus service is provided by Greyhound and Orange Belt Stage. Both bus companies depart from the Greyhound bus terminal located in downtown.

Airport Valet Express, located at Stockdale Hwy. and New Stine Road, formerly provided service to Los Angeles International Airport (LAX), but has since ceased service.

=== By taxi ===
- Bakersfield (661) 374-2227
- Lake Isabella (760) 384-2424
- Ridgecrest (760) 384-2424
- Rosamond (661) 256-2227
- Tehachapi (661) 771-2227

== Greater Bakersfield ==
Similar to the county, the city also has a transportation network to facilitate the movement of goods both through and terminating in it.

=== Intracity highways ===
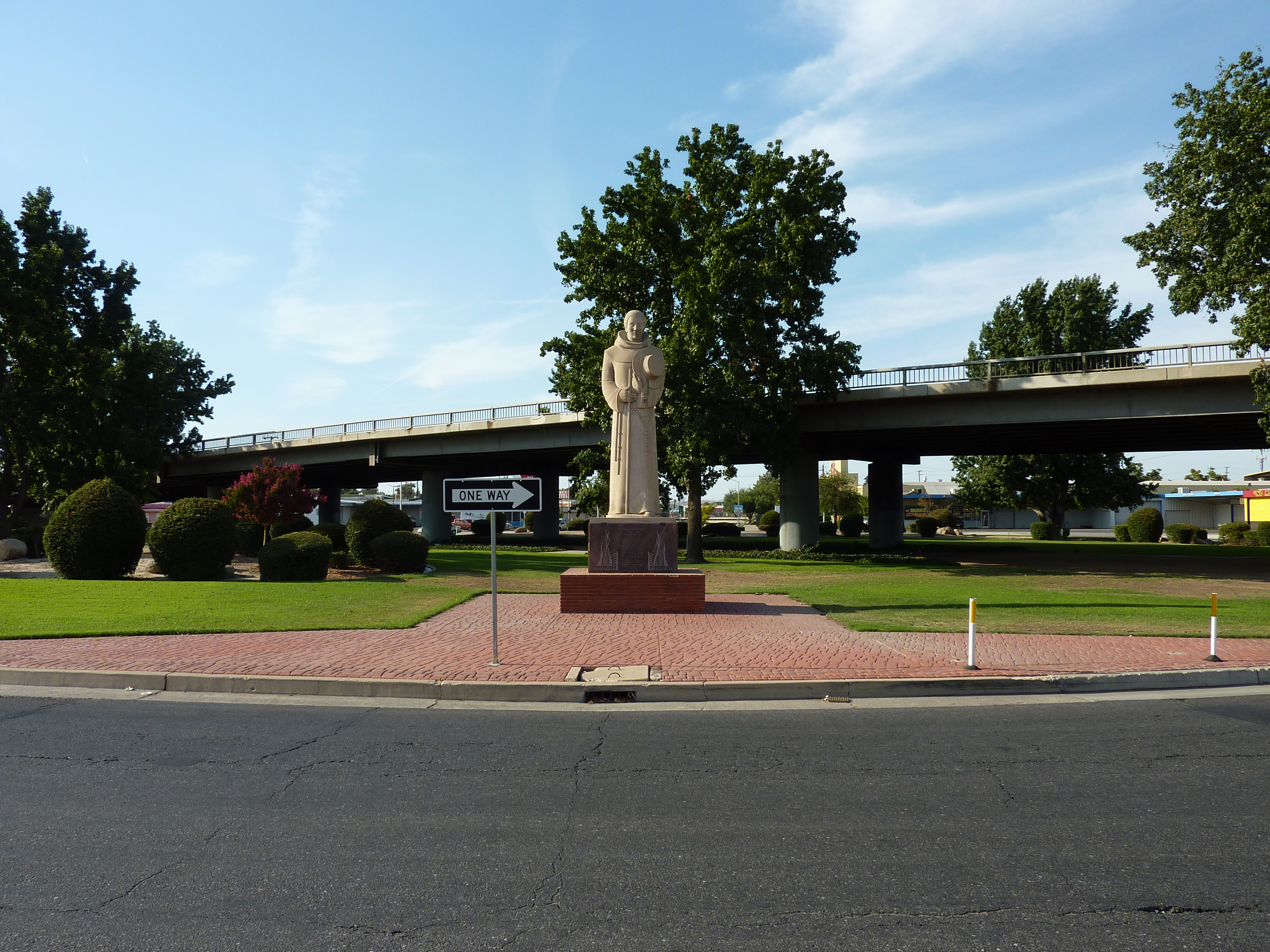
Garces Circle with SR 204 crossing above it.

Bakersfield is served by three major freeways and two minor freeways. State Route 99 is the north–south route, running through the entire length of the city, just east of downtown. It is also the mainline connecting Bakersfield with interstate routes in Sacramento and Los Angeles. State Route 178 connects east and northeast Bakersfield with downtown. However, it ends at the east end of downtown, approximately 1.5 miles from SR 99. State Route 58 is the mainline connecting Bakersfield with Interstates 15 and 40, which are major routes that serve the rest of the country. Since the route mostly travels along the southern edge of the city, it generally does not see as much intracity traffic as SR 99 and SR 178.

Currently there is no state-maintained freeway in west Bakersfield. However, the Westside Parkway is currently being constructed parallel to Stockdale Highway and the Kern River as a local freeway (built to Caltrans standards). The Centennial Corridor project (which the Westside Parkway is a part of) will connect the freeway to SR 58, creating the first continuous east–west freeway to span the width of Bakersfield. Eventually, the freeway will be extended west to I-5.

Bakersfield is also served by two minor freeways. State Route 204 (Golden State Avenue) is built as a four-lane freeway from SR 99 to F Street, a length of about 1.4 miles. This provides an alternate route for traffic from SR 178 and downtown to northwest Bakersfield and SR 99 north. The other freeway is Alfred Harrell Highway, which connects northeast Bakersfield to Hart Park and the rest of the Kern River County Park. Additional right of way was reserved to extend the freeway east to SR 178, but there are currently no plans for construction.

=== Intracity rail ===
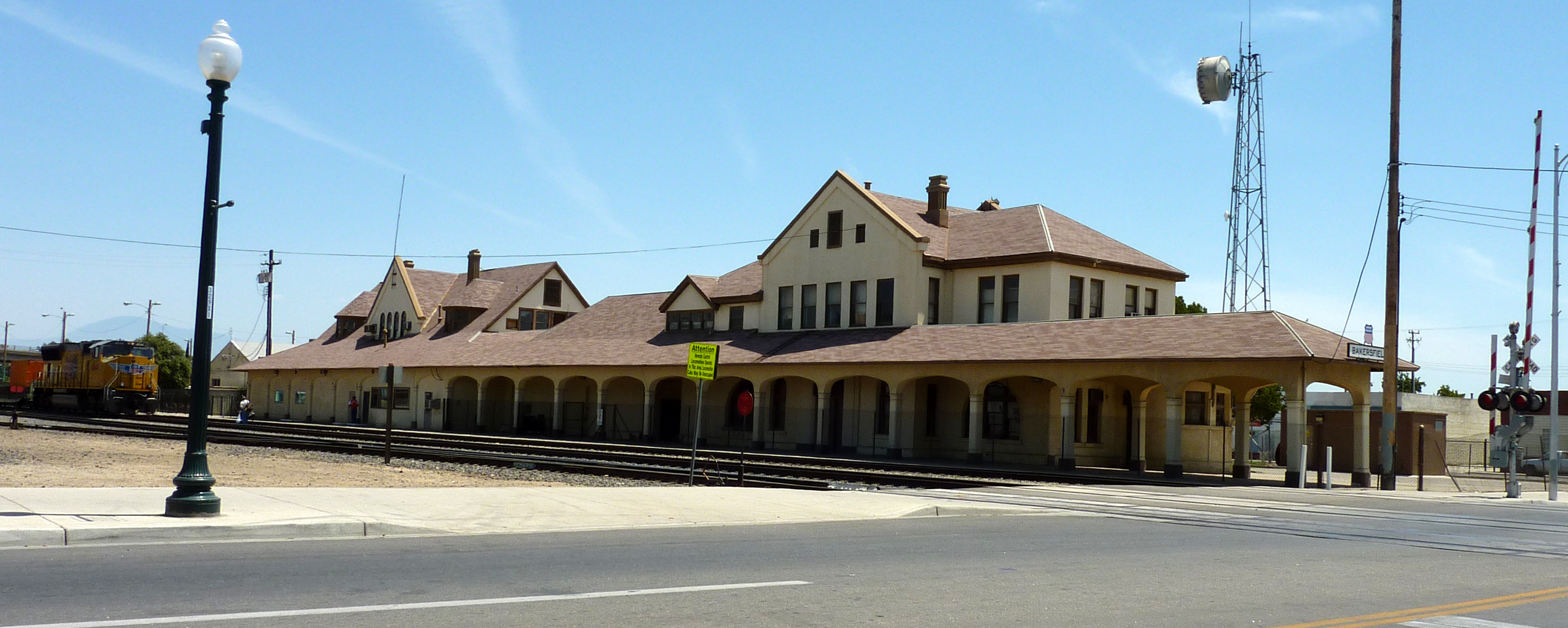
Southern Pacific's station sits idle in East Bakersfield. Office portion still used by Union Pacific.

BNSF and Union Pacific have major yards located within Bakersfield. BNSF is located in downtown Bakersfield. Because of a land dispute between Southern Pacific (later merged with Union Pacific) and the City of Bakersfield in 1874, the railroad built its line five miles east in Sumner (later annexed by Bakersfield and renamed East Bakersfield).

Since Amtrak only runs on BNSF tracks, one station is used in downtown Bakersfield. Prior to Amtrak, both railroads had passenger rail service. The Southern Pacific station was located at the intersection of Sumner and Baker streets in East Bakersfield. The need for transportation between the two stations resulted in the first street car line being built to connect them in 1888. It was also the last line to be removed when street car line was discontinued and removed.

=== Street layout ===
Bakersfield arterial streets are laid out in a grid pattern, running north–south and east–west. In central Bakersfield, collectors are also laid out in a grid pattern parallel to the arterials. In East Bakersfield, since the streets were laid out by Southern Pacific, they ran parallel to their railroad tracks, which is about 45 degrees off from the rest of the city. In older sections of southwest Bakersfield, developers used the neighborhood design, where developments were laid out on arterials behind brick walls. Collectors followed curved paths through large tracts of land. Few streets would connect to arterials for each development. This created a maze of streets, where a resident could walk for miles, before being able to leave the development. However, later developments throughout the city created a more direct path for pedestrians to exit.

=== Bus transportation ===
Public transportation in the Greater Bakersfield area is provided exclusively by Golden Empire Transit. There are two transit hubs: Downtown Transit Center and Valley Plaza Transit Center. A network of 18 routes traverses Bakersfield and serves many local attractions. These include: Northwest Promenade, Bakersfield Museum of Art (and Mill Creek), Kern County Museum, and Valley Plaza. Transportation is available to Meadows Field. However, unlike Kern Regional Transit, direct transportation to the Amtrak station is not provided.

=== Cycling ===
Bakersfield contains two bike trails. The primary trail (and the longest) is the Kern River Bike Trail. It is located in the Kern River Parkway and runs from China Grade Loop (west of Hart Park) to Enos Lane (east of I-5). The bike path follows the Kern River for its entire length. In addition, there are a couple of spur routes off of the bike path. One is located at Cal State Bakersfield, and the other is near The Park at River Walk. The other shorter bike trail is in Kern River County Park. It runs from the east side of Hart Park to the east side of the Kern River Golf Course; at the large reservable picnic area.

In addition, many arterials and collectors in Bakersfield contain a bike lane. The distance from the curb varies depending on whether there is on street parking. GET buses contain bike racks on the front of their buses and Amtrak has bike racks on the trains.

=== On foot ===
In recent years, several projects have been undertaken that are making Bakersfield a much more pedestrian-friendly city. The largest project is Mill Creek, in downtown. The Kern Island Canal, which runs through eastern downtown, was modified to resemble a natural creek. A path, with artistic landscaping, and decorative lighting was added along sides of the canal. The total length of the project is approximately 1.5 miles long. There has also been a variety of streetscape projects conducted throughout downtown. These include installing decorative lighting, planting trees, and decorative concrete.

In addition to downtown, there are many other areas throughout Bakersfield friendly to walkers. Trails exist throughout the Kern River Parkway, and the foothills in northeast Bakersfield. The Park at River Walk in the southwest, and Panorama County Park (on the Panorama Bluffs) in the northeast, are also popular places for walkers. Most new developments, primarily in the northwest and southwest, have created shaded, winding sidewalks adjacent to arterials.

== Future ==
=== Kern County ===
SR 58, 46, and 65 are all in the process, or planned to be, converted to a minimum of a 4-lane expressway. SR 58 is the closest to being completed, with only two segments remaining (both outside of Kern County). The first segment has started on SR 46, with the total project expected to take a minimum of 20 years. SR 65, the shortest highway to be converted within Kern County, is not scheduled to start construction on its first segment until at least 2025.

In addition, Kern County has proposed constructing an intermodal facility near Meadows Field. Its purpose is to allow the easy transfer of goods from one mode of transportation to another. The location is close to air with Meadows Field, rail with Union Pacific mainline, and road with State Route 99. It would also be located in the midst of Bakersfield’s growing industrial center.

In the future, SR 58 and SR 46 may be considered for a possible westward expansion of Interstate 40 via SR 58 from Barstow to Bakersfield, from Bakersfield to I-5 via Westside Parkway, and then following SR 46 to Paso Robles.

=== Greater Bakersfield ===
Bakersfield has had the challenge of its freeways not connecting to each other and west Bakersfield. The Westside Parkway provides the western freeway and the Centennial Corridor will connect it to SR 58. The last connection, which is currently not listed as a future project, will be to connect SR 178 to the Westside Parkway. When the freeway is considered, most likely at least two routes will be studied, since both have been recommended in past reports. One would travel west through downtown and Westchester, while the other would travel south through southern downtown near the BNSF railroad yard.

In addition, future projects on SR 204 (Golden State Avenue) will construct an interchange at F Street and reconfigure ramps at SR 178. These changes, combined with the existing interchange at Garces Circle, would most likely result in extending the freeway to SR 178.

Bakersfield also identified a network of beltways, which would route traffic around the outer parts of town. These beltways would be initially built as expressways, and later converted to freeways as traffic increases. Currently three beltways are being considered. The West Beltway would run north–south from Seventh Standard Road to Taft Highway. It will run parallel to Heath Road to the north and parallel to South Allen Road to the south. A future extension would connect the West Beltway to SR 99 and I-5, providing a bypass to Bakersfield. The South Beltway would run east–west from SR 58 to I-5. From SR 58, it would run south, parallel to Comanche Drive, until Taft Highway. From there, the freeway would turn west and run parallel to Taft Highway until terminating at I-5. The East Beltway would run from SR 58 north to Morning Drive. North of SR 178, the route would most likely follow the existing Alfred Harrell Highway.

=== Light rail ===
Bakersfield has considered constructing a light rail system within the city. The proposed route would run from Cal State Bakersfield in the southwest to Bakersfield College in the northeast. It would travel on surface streets, and run through many populated parts of the city, including: southwest, downtown, east Bakersfield, and northeast. A study conducted in 1998 concluded that Bakersfield was not dense enough to justify the expense. However, the study did indicate that the city was large enough to justify an express bus system. A light rail system could be phased in, first constructing stations for the bus system, and later adding tracks when the demand increases.

A part of the study was a plan for regional rail throughout the county. The routes highlighted used existing rail infrastructure, except the Sunset route to Taft, whose tracks would have to be relayed. The primary communities connected would be Bakersfield, Taft, Lamont, Arvin, and Shafter. There would also be additional stations in East Bakersfield, Rosedale, and Gosford. Similar to the city, the county is also too small to support a system at this time. However, this system could be implemented in the future, as the population of the county continues to grow.

== See also ==
- West Bakersfield Interchange
- Wheeler Ridge Interchange
