= Kern Transit =

Public transit agency serving Kern County, California

- Kern Transit operating on Route 110 in Wasco in April 2025
- Parent: Kern County Roads Department
- Founded: 1981
- Headquarters: 2700 M Street
- Locale: Bakersfield, California
- Service area: Kern County, California
- Service type: Bus service
- Routes: 12
- Hubs: Bakersfield, Frazier Park, Lake Isabella, Mojave
- Annual ridership: 513,000 (2010)
- Fuel type: CNG, Diesel
- Operator: National Express Transit
- Website: www.kerntransit.org

Kern Transit, formerly Kern Regional Transit, is the operator of mass transportation in Kern County, California. Primarily, it provides inter-regional transportation, connecting outlying regions with the city of Bakersfield (and with each other with a transfer in Bakersfield). It also provides inter-city transportation within specific regions. Kern (Regional) Transit is operated by the Kern County Department of Roads. The agency was founded in 1981. Its headquarters are located in Bakersfield.

In January 2017, operation of Kern Transit was taken over by National Express Transit.

== Routes ==
Route	Terminals		Communities Served	Connecting services	Days of Operation	Notes
100	Bakersfield; Bakersfield Amtrak station	Lancaster; Lancaster station	Bakersfield, Keene, Tehachapi, Mojave, Rosamond, Lancaster	Antelope Valley Transit Authority; Eastern Sierra Transit; Gold Runner; Golden Empire Transit; Metrolink	Daily	Runs everyday; Route 100 runs Monday-Thursday evening services to Tehachapi.
110	Bakersfield; Downtown Transit Center	Delano; Delano Transit Center	Bakersfield, Shafter, Wasco, McFarland, Delano	Delano Area Rapid Transit; Gold Runner; Golden Empire Transit; Tulare County Area Transit	Daily	Route 110 runs everyday; Some weekday trips serve Bakersfield College; Some weekends trips serve Valley Plaza Mall
120	Bakersfield; Bakersfield Amtrak station	Taft; Taft Transit Center	Bakersfield, Dustin Acres, Valley Acres, Taft	Gold Runner; Golden Empire Transit; Taft Area Transit	Mon–Sat	Runs Monday-Saturday
130	Bakersfield; GET Downtown Transit Center	Frazier Park; Flying J	Bakersfield, Wheeler Ridge, Lebec, Frazier Park,	Gold Runner; Golden Empire Transit	Mon–Sat	Runs Monday-Saturday
140	Bakersfield; GET Downtown Transit Center	Arvin; City Hall	Bakersfield (north), Lamont, Arvin	Arvin Transit; Golden Empire Transit	Weekdays	Evening service runs Monday-Thursday to Arvin
145	Bakersfield; GET Downtown Transit Center	Lamont; Buena Vista Bl. & Main St. (weekdays) Arvin; City Hall (weekends)	Bakersfield (south), Lamont, Weedpatch, Arvin	Golden Empire Transit	Daily	
150	Bakersfield; GET Downtown Transit Center	Lake Isabella; Senior Center	Bakersfield, Lake Isabella	Gold Runner; Golden Empire Transit	Daily	
220	Lake Isabella; Senior Center	Kernville; Valley View Dr & Sierra Way	Kernville, Lake Isabella,Wofford Heights		Mon–Sat	
227	Lake Isabella; Senior Center	Ridgecrest; Cerro Coso College	Lake Isabella, Onyx, Inyokern, Ridgecrest	RidgeRunner	Mon, Wed, Fri	
230	Mojave; Inyo St & K St	Ridgecrest; Walmart	Mojave, California City, Inyokern, Ridgecrest	Eastern Sierra Transit Authority; RidgeRunner	Mon, Wed, Fri	
240	Mojave; Inyo St & Hwy 14	Boron; Post Office	Boron, Mojave, North Edwards	Eastern Sierra Transit Authority	Mon, Wed, Fri	
250	Lancaster; Lancaster station	California City; Rite Aid	California City, Mojave, Rosamond, Lancaster	Metrolink; Amtrak California; Eastern Sierra Transit Authority; Antelope Valley Transit Authority		

== Hubs and connecting services ==
Bakersfield is the central hub for the inter-regional routes. Buses stop at the Downtown Transit Center (operated by Golden Empire Transit), or the Bakersfield Amtrak Station which is also located downtown, or both. Bus bays are used at the Amtrak Station, while none are available at the Transit Center. Buses instead park on Chester Avenue, in front of it. Depending on the route, Kern Regional Transit makes additional stops in Bakersfield, but are generally used either to board or discharge passengers (depending on the direction the bus is traveling).

Additional hubs are located in Frazier Park, Lake Isabella, and Mojave. Passengers transfer from inter-regional routes to inter-city routes that serve the specific region. Many of these routes were requested and funded by local governments, instead of operating their own transit system.

Some local governments have funded their own public transportation system, instead of relying on Kern Regional Transit. These include Arvin (Arvin Transit), Delano (Delano Area Rapid Transit), and Taft (Taft Area Transit). In addition, Shafter and Wasco provide their own Dial-a-ride service, which serves their communities.

== Fare and schedule ==
- Local Routes:

(140,145,210,220,223,&225) & All Dial-A-Rides operated by Kern Transit

General Fare: $2.00/Reduced Fare: $1.00

- Inter-Community Routes:

([100 not traveling through Tehachapi],110,115,120,[130 not traveling through Frazier Park],150,227,230,240,&250)

General Fare: $3.00 Reduced Fare: $1.50

- Cross County Routes:

100 traveling through Tehachapi and 130 traveling through Frazier Park

General Fare: $5.00 Reduced Fare: $2.50

Operating days vary greatly depending on the route. Most of the long distance inter-regional (100,110,120,130,250)routes run 6 or 7 days a week. However, some (227,230) run 3 days a week. Shorter regional routes (115,210,240) mostly run 2 or 3 days a week. However, some (all Kern River Valley routes, 140,145) run 6 or 7 days a week.

== Fleet ==
Because of the wide variety of demand for service in various areas, Kern Regional Transit uses a variety of vehicles. The fleet consists of 40-foot, 35-foot, 30-foot, and 21-foot buses which are used on scheduled routes depending on the number of riders.

All buses are equipped with wheelchair ramps, and offer bicycle racks. A portion of the fleet runs on compressed natural gas. The paint scheme is white, with "Regional Transit" in large letters in the center, on all sides. On the sides, a small "Kern Regional Transit" logo is directly in front of "Regional Transit", with the slogan "...your county connection" directly behind. Changeable signs, which list the destination city, are only on the front and left side of the bus.

== Maintenance facility ==
The maintenance facility is located on Victor Street, just south of Olive Drive in Northwest Bakersfield. It contains parking for the entire fleet, shops, bus wash, and cleaning facilities. The facility does not contain the headquarters for the agency. That is located in the Public Services Building on "M" Street.
