= Bakersfield and Kern Electric Railway =

Former streetcar operator in Bakersfield, California

Overview
- Locale: Bakersfield, California
- Transit type: Streetcar, Bus
- Number of lines: 5 streetcar, 3 bus (1915)
- Annual ridership: 1.4 million (1915)

Operation
- Began operation: May 1888
- Ended operation: February 28, 1942 (Streetcar)
- Number of vehicles: 23 (Total number of streetcars)
- Train length: 1 Car
- Headway: 15–20 minutes

Technical
- System length: 10.51 mi (16.91 km)
- Track gauge: 4 ft 8 1/2 in (1,435 mm) standard gauge
- Electrification: Overhead line, 550 V DC
- Average speed: 25 mph (40 km/h)

The Bakersfield and Kern Electric Railway was a streetcar company which operated between Bakersfield and Sumner (later Kern City), in California. Later, after Kern City was annexed by Bakersfield, the streetcar company operated completely in Bakersfield. The company was originally formed in 1887, under the name Bakersfield and Sumner Railroad. At its height, in 1915, the company operated five streetcar lines, totaling 10.5 miles (16.9 km). It also operated three feeder bus lines, one of the first companies in the nation to offer that type of service. Also, with the exception of one-way sections, the entire system was double tracked.

The company discontinued streetcar service in 1942, having replaced them with buses. The current provider of mass transit for Bakersfield, Golden Empire Transit, is the latest of an unbroken line of owners of the company.

== History ==
=== Early history ===
In 1874, after a land dispute between the City of Bakersfield and the Southern Pacific Railroad, the railroad built its tracks about 2 miles (3.2 km) east of the city. It founded the town of Sumner as its rail stop. It was soon realized that efficient transportation between these two points was needed. So in the same year, a franchise was granted by the city for the construction of a streetcar line. That company, however, never constructed the line. Transportation was instead provided by road vehicles. One of the earliest was the H. H. Fish Omnibus Line, which charged $1 for the trip.

In 1887, a second franchise was granted to a partnership made up of T.J. Packard, H.A. Blodget, John Keith and H.H. Fish (the operator of the Omnibus Line). In 1888, they constructed a single track railroad between the Courthouse in Bakersfield with the Southern Pacific Train Station. The company was named the Bakersfield and Sumner Railroad and used horse drawn cars on 16-pound rails, which were previously used in a mine. The underlying ballast was substandard, and during heavy rain the cars would sink into the street or derail. The trek was through rural terrain, with little development.

=== Electrification ===
In December 1894, the Power Development Company was founded. Its owners were H. A. Blodgett, C. N. Beale, S. W. Fergusson, W. S. Tevis and Henry Jastro. The company began work on constructing a hydroelectric power plant at the base of the Kern River Canyon. The construction was completed in 1897. It also would provide enough power for an electric streetcar line.

In 1900, the power company absorbed the streetcar line. That same year, the subsidiary was named the Bakersfield and Kern Electric Railway (Sumner was incorporated in 1892 and was renamed Kern City). With electricity being provided in a large enough quantity, the company began electrifying the line. An unusual decision was made to use a 550-volt system, instead of the more common 600-volt. In preparation for heavier cars, the rails were upgraded to 36-pound girder type (which was previously used in Australia). Four 24-seat passenger cars were purchased.

Inaugural service of the new upgraded line was on February 17, 1901. The trip would take only 12 minutes. One year later, the company began making plans for an ambitious expansion. Four single track lines would be constructed within Bakersfield. They were operational in 1903. Although some of these routes would be realigned or extended, this made up the basic streetcar system used in the city for the next 20 years.

In 1903, "observation car" service started. The route started at the intersection of 19th Street and Chester Avenue and traversed the entire system. Its primary purpose was for sightseeing. It was decorated with flags and cost $0.10 to ride. Originally it only operated on Sundays. However, it was so popular that two evening weekday services was also added.

=== Major expansion and upgrade ===
In 1909, the first section of track was double tracked. It was the main line on 19th Street, between F Street and H Street. The track was also upgraded with 87-pound rails. The next year, the company was purchased by the San Joaquin Light and Power Company. This would result in a major overhaul of the entire system. Between 1911 and 1912, with the exception of one-way sections, the entire system was double tracked. Also, all of the track was upgraded to 87-pound rails, in preparation for new cars which were purchased. The car barn was also moved from 19th Street and Union Avenue, to 19th Street and Oak Street, adjacent to the Recreation Park. The previous yard was used for storage by the power company.

In 1915 the first "bus" system was started in the city. Called "jitney," they were little more than a model-T Ford station wagon. It would connect the city with the outlying areas. They would greatly impact the profits of the streetcar line. That same year, ordinances were passed by the city, which restricted where they could operate, so they would not be a direct competitor to the streetcar company. The Bakersfield and Kern Electric Railway also started running its own feeder bus service, to connect the outlying areas with the streetcar line.

=== Decline ===
In 1920, a fire started in the Recreation Park adjacent to the car barn. The fire spread and destroyed the car barn. Two streetcars were lost in the fire. It was decided to abandon the Oak Street location and move operations back to the Union Avenue facilities.

By the mid-1920s, bus transportation began to dominate the public transportation market. Ridership on the streetcar would continue to decline. In 1933, after continued losses, the San Joaquin Power and Light Company would sell the streetcar and bus company to the employees. Starting that year, bus lines would begin to replace streetcar lines. By the end, the only streetcar route that would operate was the original Santa Fe and Southern Pacific Line. In 1942, streetcar service would end and the system was completely run by buses.

=== City ownership and bus operations ===
The company continued to operate privately for several years. It also continued to use the name Bakersfield and Kern Electric Railway, even though none of the system was operated by rail. In 1949, the name was changed to the Bakersfield Transit Company. There was a continued rise in automobile use, which resulted in a decrease in ridership for the company. By 1956, the city would temporary run the system. The following year, after approval by the voters, the city purchased the bus system for $395,000. It was named the Bakersfield Transit Agency.

Under the city's ownership, there were little changes made to the system. Some new equipment was purchased in the late 1950s and in 1960. Also, there were some minor route changes to serve new growth areas of the city. By 1970, the system was losing $91,000 per year. Also, much of the system was being operated in the county. The city asked the voters whether they wanted to continue having a bus system. Over 70% voted in favor of keeping it. Two years later, after a second vote, the Golden Empire Transit District was formed. It would take over ownership and operation of the bus line. It would also end the city's direct involvement in its operation.

== Routes ==
=== Streetcar routes ===
At its height, five streetcar routes were operated.

- Santa Fe and Southern Pacific Line - This was the main line which ran from the Santa Fe Bakersfield Station to the Southern Pacific Sumner Station (later Bakersfield Station).
- F Street and H Street Loop - This started at the terminal of the Santa Fe and Southern Pacific Line. It traveled south on F Street to California Avenue. It then looped north on H Street, ending at a switch on 19th Street, reconnecting with the main line. This created a loop. Later the H Street switch was abandoned and the loop became a line between Santa Fe Station and the intersection of 19th Street and H Street (although it continued to have the name loop).
- North Chester Line - It initially ran from the intersection of 19th Street and Chester Avenue, to the intersection of 30th Street and K Street. It was later realigned to run entirely on Chester Avenue, ending at 32nd Street, across the tracks from the Southern Pacific Chester Station.
- South Chester Line - This ran from the intersection of 19th Street and Chester Avenue to the intersection of 8th Street and Chester Avenue. It then looped back via 8th Street, N Street and 11th Street.
- West 19th Street Line - This started at the intersection of 19th Street and F Street, where the Santa Fe and Southern Pacific Line turned south to connect to the Santa Fe Bakersfield Station. It continued west to Oak Street, where it turned south to Truxtun Avenue. A short branch line was constructed on Ceder Street, which terminated at 18th Street.

=== Feeder bus routes ===
Before the conversion of streetcar service to buses, three bus routes were in operation. The Westpark Line started at the Santa Fe Bakersfield Station and served the area southeast of the station (which is known as Westpark). Another line started at the Southern Pacific Bakersfield Station, and traveled east on Niles Street to Brown Street. The last line also started at the Southern Pacific Bakersfield Station and traveled north on Baker Street to Garces Street, where the waterworks was located.

== Equipment ==
A total of 23 electric streetcars were purchased over the life of the system. The early cars were open–closed California cars. Later entirely enclosed cars were purchased. After that, light-weight safety cars replaced the heavier equipment. These cars could start and stop quickly and could not move when the door was opened.

Little information is known about the horse drawn cars that operated before the line was electrified. From pictures, it is known that they were open air and could seat 18 to 20 people. Little is also known about the number and type of buses the company operated.

== See also ==
- Golden Empire Transit
- Transportation in Kern County
