= F Street =

F Street or "F" Street is the sixth of a sequence of alphabetical streets in many cities.

It may refer to:

- F Street (Washington, D.C.), including about F Street and 7th Street shopping districts
- F Street and H Street Loop (Bakersfield and Kern Electric)
- F Street Bridge (disambiguation), relating to F Streets of Salida, Colorado and of Palouse, Washington)

== See also ==
- F Street House, George Washington University's president's home, Washington, D.C.
