= Bakersfield station (Amtrak) =

Amtrak train station in Bakersfield, California

Bakersfield, CA
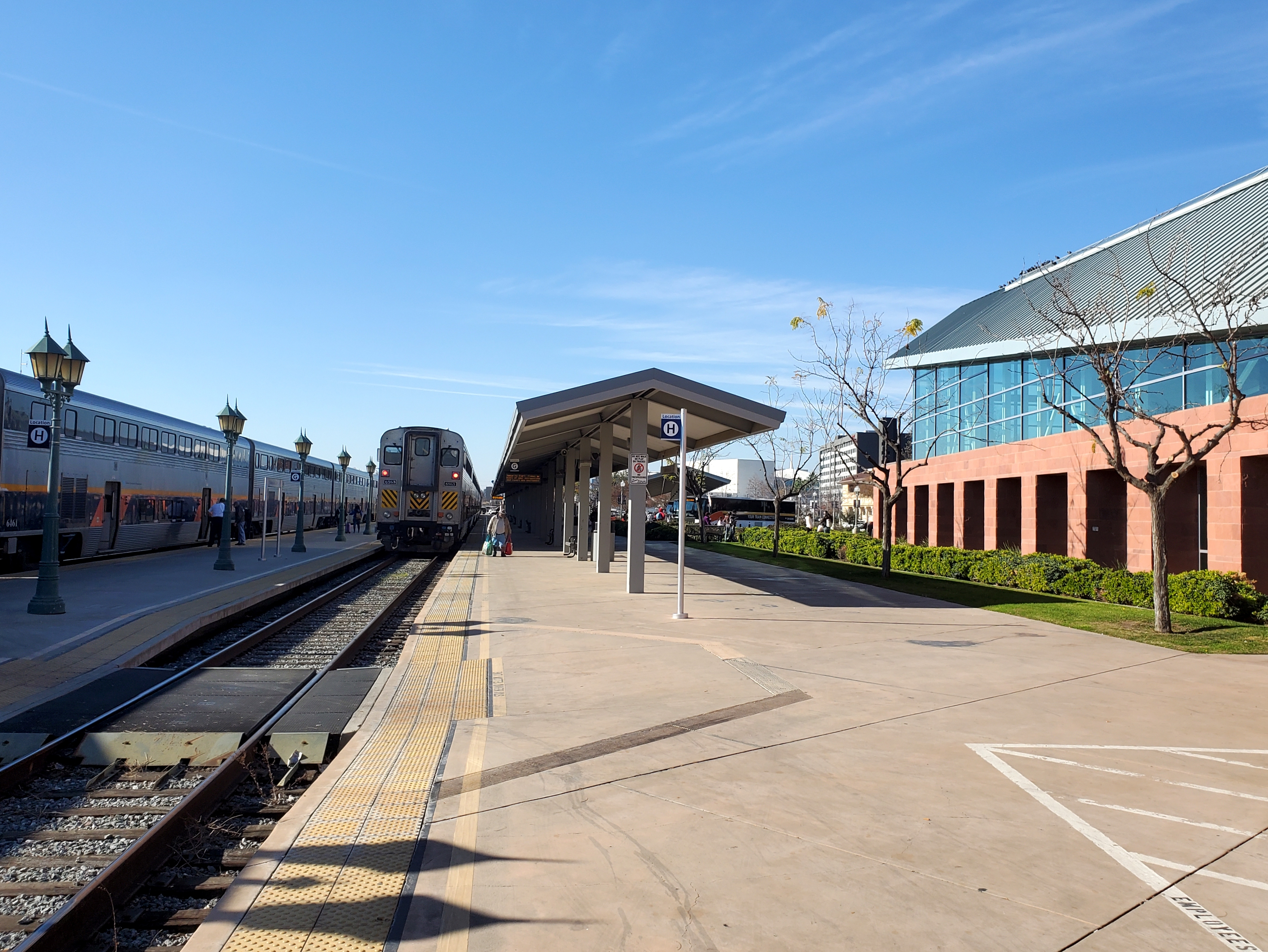
- Two San Joaquins trains at Bakersfield station in December 2021

General information
- Location: 601 Truxtun Avenue; Bakersfield, California; United States
- Coordinates: 35°22′20″N 119°0′35″W
- Owner: City of Bakersfield
- Line: BNSF Mojave Subdivision
- Platforms: 1 side platform, 1 island platform
- Tracks: 3
- Bus stands: 17
- Bus operators: Amtrak Thruway; Greyhound Lines
- Connections: Golden Empire Transit; Kern Regional Transit

Construction
- Parking: Yes
- Cycle facilities: Rack
- Accessible: Yes

Other information
- Status: Staffed, checked baggage service available
- Station code: Amtrak: BFD

History
- Opened: July 4, 2000

Passengers
- FY 2025: 376,353 (Amtrak)

Services
Preceding station	Amtrak	Following station
Wasco toward Oakland or Sacramento	Gold Runner	Terminus
Former services (at AT&SF station)
Preceding station	Atchison, Topeka and Santa Fe Railway	Following station
Shafter toward Richmond	Valley Division	Mojave Trackage rights via Southern Pacific Railroad toward Barstow
Kern toward Monarch or Shale	Sunset Railway	Terminus
Preceding station	Bakersfield and Kern Electric Railway	Following station
Terminus	Santa Fe and Southern Pacific Line	Grove Street / Baker Street toward Sumner
14th Street / F Street toward 19th Street / H Street	F Street and H Street Loop	Terminus
Location

Bakersfield station is an intermodal facility in Bakersfield, California. It is the southern terminus of Amtrak California's Gold Runner route, with Amtrak Thruway buses continuing to Amtrak stations and bus stops throughout Southern California and Nevada. The station opened with a celebration on July 4, 2000. It contains an 8,300-square-foot (770 m^{2}) train station with two platforms and three tracks, as well as a 17-bay bus station.

The original operator for train service on this line was the Atchison, Topeka and Santa Fe. Their station was located at the intersection of 15th Street and F Street (about 0.9 miles (1.4 km) west). It was constructed in 1899 and demolished in 1972. Named Santa Fe passenger trains served at the station included the San Francisco Chief, and Golden Gate. Starting in 1974, Amtrak operated out of a temporary station at that site, until this station was constructed. Since 1971, direct service south to Los Angeles has not been permitted due to a ban on passenger trains through the Tehachapi Loop.

== History ==
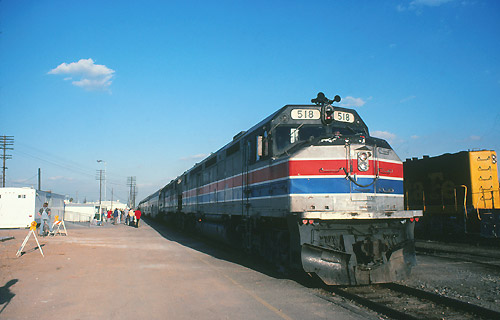
San Joaquin train at Bakersfield in 1979

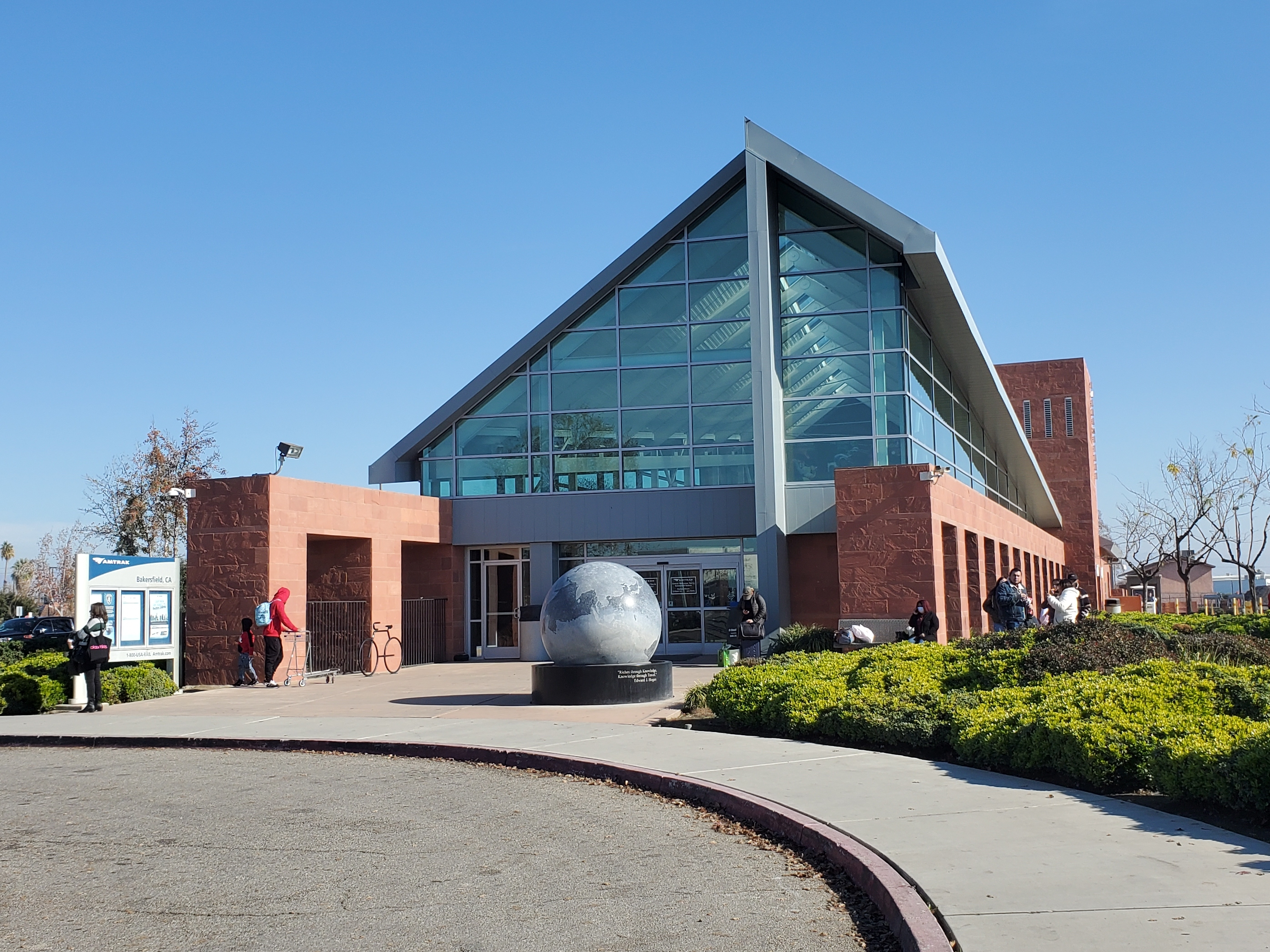
The 2000-built station in 2021

Construction of the San Francisco and San Joaquin Valley Railroad reached Bakersfield in 1898, and was completed in 1899. However, they would not construct a train station in the city, because once completed, the railroad was purchased by Atchison, Topeka and Santa Fe. It would also obtain trackage rights over Tehachapi Pass from the Southern Pacific Railroad. They constructed the Bakersfield Santa Fe Station in 1899, at the intersection of F Street and 15th Street.

The station occupied two blocks of land, between D Street and F Street. A Harvey House was located on the east side of the station. In 1901, the Bakersfield and Kern Electric Railway was relocated to serve the station. It provided a direct connection between the Bakersfield Santa Fe Station and the Bakersfield Southern Pacific Station (about 2.5 miles east in East Bakersfield). In 1938, Santa Fe began operating intermodal rail service on the San Joaquin Valley line. Trains would travel between Oakland and Bakersfield on the railroad line. At Bakersfield passengers would transfer to one of several bus routes, which departed for destinations in Southern California. As a result, bus bays were constructed at the station.

Service continued until 1971, when Amtrak was formed. Since a rail route along the coast and in the San Joaquin Valley was considered redundant, the San Joaquin Valley route was dropped. In 1972, the train station was demolished by Santa Fe and replaced with freight offices and a parking lot.

However, train service restarted only two years later, in 1974. It was decided to use the intermodal route previously used by Santa Fe, instead of the Tehachapi route used by Southern Pacific. This would pose a problem for Bakersfield. The city would serve as the transfer point between rail and bus, but did not have any facilities for it.

A temporary structure was erected at the new parking lot (part of the previous site occupied by the station) east of the freight offices, to serve as the station. Buses would park wherever space was available. The station was served by only one track. As ridership increased, the station became ineffective at containing all of the passengers. Also, adding more bus routes forced them to park in an adjacent alley. In 1985, the temporary structure was doubled in size in an attempt to keep up with demand.

In the late 1990s, plans were started for the construction of a new, permanent train station. Land at the intersection of Truxtun Avenue and S Street was selected for the site. It would cost $5.1 million, funded by the State of California with Bakersfield as the lead agency. The station would officially open on July 4, 2000, with a demonstration train breaking through a ceremonial barrier. In attendance were the mayor, state senator Jim Costa, and Amtrak officials. Country music star Buck Owens (who lived in Bakersfield) performed at the event.

The Bakersfield station of the California High-Speed Rail system was originally to be co-located with the existing station. However, an alternate alignment with a new station further north was adopted in 2014.

Greyhound Lines moved into Bakersfield station in late 2021, after moving out of its 60-year-old bus depot in downtown Bakersfield. Greyhound said that the facility was too large for their needs, and the property had been sold in July 2020. Greyhound added two new bus bays west of the Amtrak Thruway bus bays, a covered outdoor waiting area with storage, and a ticket office inside the city-owned station building.

Gold Runner trains are expected to cease services here once California High-Speed Rail operations begin.

== Station services ==
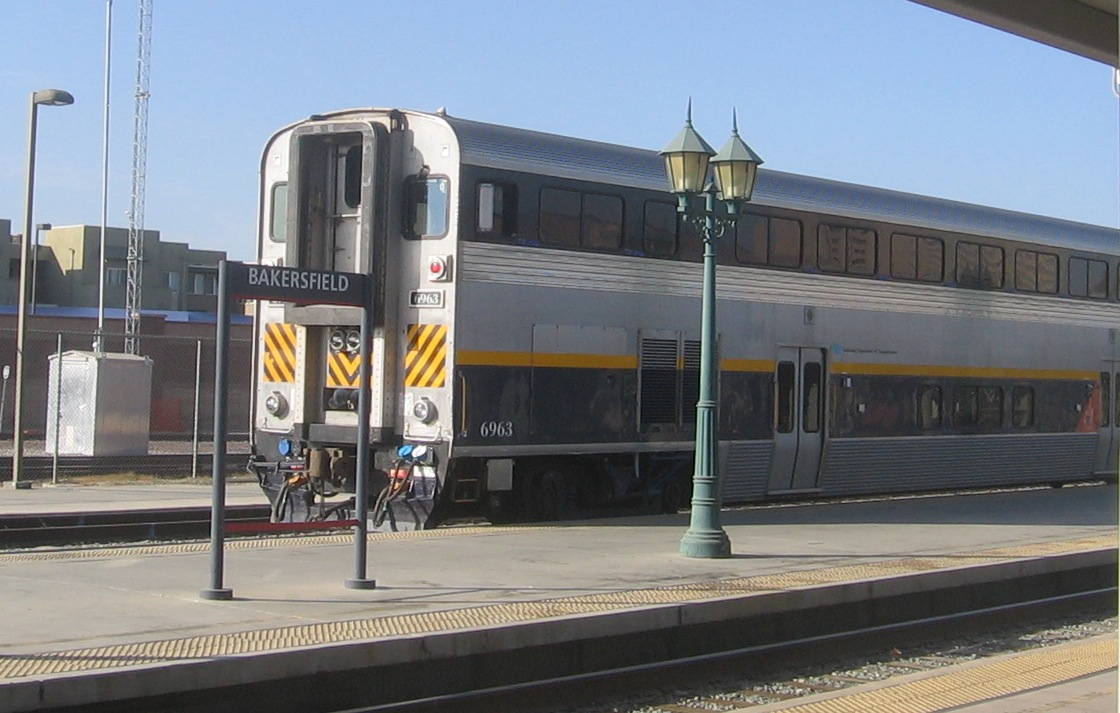
San Joaquin train stopped at the island platform of Bakersfield station.

Bakersfield's Amtrak station is a staffed station with an enclosed waiting room. Inside, there is both a staffed ticket window and Amtrak's self-service Quik-Trak ticket kiosk, as well as a Greyhound booth. There is seating, a payphone, restrooms, and vending machines. The station also offers checked baggage and Amtrak Express package service. Taxi stands are located to the west and a passenger pick-up and drop-off zone is located directly north of the station building. A free, unattended parking lot is available for passengers.

The station has two tracks and two platforms (one side platform, and one island platform) accessible by passengers. Each platform can hold a six-car train. A third track provides for overnight storage and is not used by passengers. There is also a 15 bay bus station located north of the tracks. The bus bays and one platform are sheltered.

Of the California stations served by Amtrak, Bakersfield was the fifth busiest in Fiscal Year 2018 (behind only Los Angeles Union Station, Sacramento Valley, San Diego and Emeryville), boarding or detraining a total of 442,023 passengers. It is also the 25th busiest Amtrak station nationwide, and one of the busiest serving a metro area with fewer than 2 million people.

=== Bus connections ===
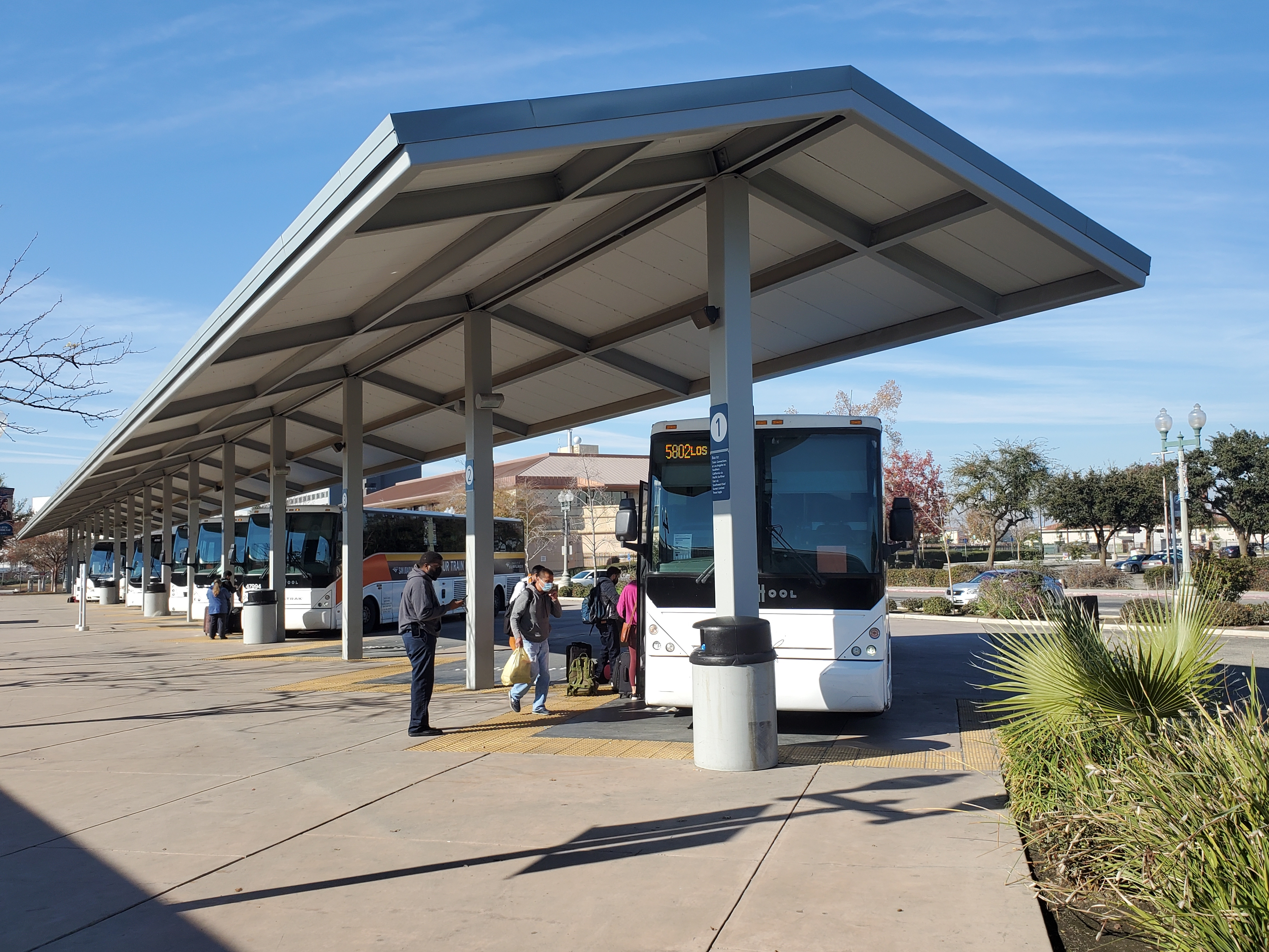
Bakersfield station is a major transfer point between trains and Amtrak Thruway buses

==== Amtrak Thruway ====
Bakersfield is the transfer point between Gold Runner trains and Amtrak Thruway buses connecting to Southern California destinations. The buses are necessary in part because passenger trains are normally not allowed on the Tehachapi Loop, the only direct rail link between the San Joaquin Valley and Southern California.

Bay	Route	Terminal A	Stops	Terminal B	Connecting Trains
1	1	Bakersfield	non-stop service for train connections	Los Angeles	702, 703, 710, 711, 712, 713, 714, 715, 716, 717, 719
4	1	Bakersfield	Glendale	Los Angeles	702, 703, 710, 711, 712, 713, 714, 715, 716, 717, 719
6	1C	Bakersfield	Santa Clarita, Hollywood Burbank Airport, Van Nuys, Westwood/UCLA	Santa Monica	710, 711, 713, 714, 715, 718
8	19	Bakersfield	La Crescenta, Pasadena, Claremont, Ontario, Riverside	San Bernardino	713, 716
10	10	Bakersfield	Fillmore, Santa Paula, Oxnard, Ventura, Carpinteria	Santa Barbara	712, 719
14	10	Bakersfield	Tehachapi, Mojave, Barstow	Las Vegas	712, 719
Late Night/Early Morning Service
1	1	Bakersfield	Santa Clarita, Hollywood Burbank Airport, Glendale, Los Angeles, Fullerton, Anaheim, Santa Ana, Irvine, San Juan Capistrano, Oceanside, Solana Beach	San Diego	711, 718
1	1	Fresno	Hanford, Bakersfield, Santa Clarita (northbound)	Los Angeles	none

==== Greyhound Lines ====
Greyhound Lines service moved here in 2022 after its longtime station on 18th Street closed. They operate out of two bus bays west of the Amtrak Thruway bus bays. Greyhound also has a covered outdoor waiting area and a ticket kiosk inside the station building.

==== Kern Transit ====
Kern Transit is the regional transit provider for Kern County. The station is one of two major hubs used within Bakersfield (the other is the Downtown Transit Center primarily used by Golden Empire Transit). Currently five bus routes connect with half of the train routes. They travel to various locations throughout the county, including: Desert Communities, East San Joaquin Valley, Kern River Valley, Mountain Communities, and West Kern.
