= Santa Fe and Southern Pacific Line =

Overview
- Status: Abandoned
- Locale: Bakersfield, California
- Termini: Santa Fe Bakersfield Station; Southern Pacific Bakersfield Station

Service
- Type: Streetcar
- System: Bakersfield and Kern Electric Railway
- Depot(s): 19th St / Union Ave Car barn (1903–1912, 1920–1942); 19th St / Oak St Car barn (1912–1920)

History
- Opened: May 1888
- Closed: February 12, 1942

Technical
- Track gauge: 4 ft 8 1/2 in (1,435 mm) standard gauge
- Electrification: Overhead line, 550 V DC

The Santa Fe and Southern Pacific Line was the main line of the Bakersfield and Kern Electric Railway. It operated between the Santa Fe Bakersfield Station and the Southern Pacific Bakersfield Station (originally the Sumner Station and later the Kern City Station). It was the first line in the system, constructed in 1888. It was also the last line to close in the system, in 1942.

== History ==
The line was originally a single track, constructed of 16-pound rails (previously used in a mine). The cars used were horse drawn. In 1900, the line was electrified and upgraded. The rails were replaced with 36-pound rails and a passing section was added at 19th Street and Chester Avenue. The car barn was constructed at 19th Street and Union Avenue. In 1903, four additional lines were added. This resulted in a large number of switches being added, including the T-crossing at 19th Street and Chester Avenue.

Between 1911 and 1912, the line was again upgraded. The track was replaced with 87-pound rails. The entire length of the line was double tracked. In addition, the car barn was moved to a location on 19th Street and Oak Street (which was on the West 19th Street Line). In 1915, feeder bus service started at both the Santa Fe Bakersfield Station and Southern Pacific Bakersfield Station. They would connect the streetcar system with growing areas both in the north and south of town.

In 1920, a fire burned the car barn on Oak Street down. It was rebuilt at its original location on Union Avenue. In 1930, street cars were running every 15 minutes. However, popularity of the line began to diminish. In 1942, the line was removed and converted to buses. It was combined with one of the existing bus lines which ran from the Southern Pacific Bakersfield Station.

== Connections ==
=== Streetcar ===
- F Street and H Street Loop
- North Chester Line
- South Chester Line
- West 19th Street Line

Note: all service provided by the Bakersfield and Kern Electric Railway

=== Intercity rail ===
- Santa Fe Bakersfield Station - with connections to Santa Fe express routes serving the San Joaquin Valley.
- Southern Pacific Bakersfield Station - with connections to Southern Pacific express routes serving California.

=== Bus service ===
- East Niles Bus Line - Starting at the Southern Pacific Bakersfield Station and travel east on Niles Street to Brown Street.
- North Baker Bus Line - Starting at the Southern Pacific Bakersfield Station and travel north on Bakers Street to the waterworks at Garces Street.
- Westpark Bus Line - Starting at the Santa Fe Bakersfield Station and serve the areas to the southwest.

Note: all service provided by the Bakersfield and Kern Electric Railway
