= Delano Area Rapid Transit =

Public transit system in Delano, California

- Headquarters: 1120 Glenwood Street, Delano, CA 93215
- Locale: Delano, CA
- Service area: Delano and surrounding Kern County
- Service type: Fixed-route bus, demand-response, microtransit
- Routes: 5
- Hubs: Delano Transit Center
- Fuel type: Diesel, CNG, gasoline
- Website: www.cityofdelano.org/92/Delano-Area-Rapid-Transit-DART

Delano Area Rapid Transit (DART) is a municipal public transit system serving Delano, California, the second-largest city in Kern County. Operated by the City of Delano's Transportation Services Division, DART provides fixed-route bus service on four local routes within the city, an intercity express route to Bakersfield, demand-response paratransit through its Delano Area Dial-A-Ride program, and a microtransit service called DART N'GO. All services originate from the Delano Transit Center at 1120 Glenwood Street, at the corner of 11th Avenue.

DART provides connections to Kern Regional Transit and Tulare County Area Transit (TCaT) for travel beyond the Delano area.

== Service area ==
DART's fixed-route service covers destinations within the Delano city limits. The broader Dial-A-Ride service area extends into surrounding unincorporated Kern County, bounded by State Route 43 to the west, County Line Road to the north, Pond Road to the south, and Kyte Avenue to the east. Dial-A-Ride is also available to general public residents who live more than three-quarters of a mile from a DART fixed-route alignment.

== Services ==
=== Fixed routes ===
DART operates four local fixed routes as loops, all beginning and ending at the Delano Transit Center. Fixed-route service operates Monday through Friday from 7:00 a.m. to 5:00 p.m., and Saturday from 8:30 a.m. to 4:30 p.m. There is no service on Sundays or on New Year's Day, Memorial Day, Independence Day, Labor Day, Thanksgiving, and Christmas Day.

Route	Area served	Via	Notes
1	Eastern Delano	11th Avenue, Browning Road	Clockwise loop
2	Southern Delano	Lexington Street, Garces Highway	Counter-clockwise loop; serves Delano Regional Medical Center, Delano Marketplace
3	Northern Delano	High Street, Cecil Avenue	Clockwise loop; serves Delano Village Shopping Center, Delano High School
4	Western Delano	Albany Street	Serves Robert F. Kennedy High School, Bakersfield College Delano Campus

=== Bakersfield Express ===
DART also operates an intercity express route (Route 5) connecting Delano to Bakersfield via McFarland. This route provides weekday-only service, terminating at the Downtown Transit Center in Bakersfield operated by Golden Empire Transit.

=== Dial-A-Ride ===
Delano Area Dial-A-Ride is a demand-response service providing door-to-door transportation. The service is available to seniors aged 61 and over, persons with disabilities, and riders certified under the Americans with Disabilities Act (ADA). Dial-A-Ride also serves as the complementary ADA paratransit service for DART fixed-route buses, operating in accordance with ADA requirements.

The service offers a subscription option for riders who make repetitive trips, such as dialysis patients, allowing them to schedule regular service without calling for each individual trip. Visitors to the Delano area who are ADA paratransit-certified by another transit system may use the service for up to 21 days within a 365-day period.

=== DART N'GO ===
DART N'GO is a curb-to-curb microtransit service operating within a predetermined zone. The service is available on Saturdays from 8:30 a.m. to 4:30 p.m. Riders can make reservations by calling DART's customer service line or by booking through the Rides On Demand mobile application, available for iOS and Android.

== Fleet ==
DART operates a mixed fleet of buses fueled by diesel, compressed natural gas (CNG), and gasoline. All buses are equipped with wheelchair lifts and bicycle racks.

== Fares ==
All DART services have been free of charge since July 1, 2022. Prior to the fare suspension, standard fixed-route fares were $1.50 for adults (ages 6–60), $0.75 for seniors (over 61), ADA-certified riders, and Medicare cardholders, and free for the first child aged five and under. Monthly unlimited passes were available at $40 for general riders and $30 for youth (ages 6–18), along with a $6 general day pass. Transfers between routes were valid for 30 minutes on the same day.

Dial-A-Ride fares, when in effect, were $3.00 for seniors, ADA-certified riders, and Medicare cardholders.

== Accessibility ==
All DART fixed-route buses are wheelchair accessible, with tie-downs for wheelchairs and priority seating for seniors and persons with disabilities. Transit information is available in accessible formats by telephone, including through the California Relay Service for TDD and TTY users.

== Connections ==
DART provides connections at the Delano Transit Center to several regional and intercity transportation providers:

- Kern Regional Transit — intercity bus service connecting Delano to Bakersfield and other Kern County communities
- Tulare County Area Transit (TCaT) — bus service to Tulare County

== Technology ==
In 2016, DART implemented RouteMatch Software's enterprise platform for both its fixed-route and demand-response operations. The technology enabled real-time vehicle tracking, improved on-time performance, and data-driven decisions for bus shelter placement based on passenger pick-up information. DART also adopted RouteMatch's RouteShout traveler information system to provide real-time arrival information to riders via smartphone.

== See also ==
- Kern Transit
- Golden Empire Transit
- Tulare County Area Transit
- Delano, California
