= F Street Bridge =

F Street Bridge may refer to:

- F Street Bridge (Salida, Colorado), listed on the National Register of Historic Places (NRHP) in Chaffee County
- F Street Bridge (Palouse, Washington), listed on the NRHP in Whitman County

== See also ==
- F Street (disambiguation)
