= South Chester Line =

Overview
- Status: Abandoned
- Locale: Bakersfield, California
- Termini: 19th St / Chester Ave; 8th St / N St

Service
- Type: Streetcar
- System: Bakersfield and Kern Electric Railway
- Depot(s): 19th St / Union Ave Car barn (1903-1912, 1920-1939); 19th St / Oak St Car barn (1912-1920)

History
- Opened: 1903
- Closed: July 1, 1939

Technical
- Track gauge: 4 ft 8 1/2 in (1,435 mm) standard gauge
- Electrification: Overhead line, 550 V DC

The South Chester Line was a line of the Bakersfield and Kern Electric Railway. The route originated at the intersection of 19th Street and Chester Avenue, and traveled south on Chester. At the southern end of the line, there was a loop around 8th Street, N Street, and 11th Street. The line was constructed in 1903, as part of the original expansion plan. It closed in 1939.

The line was originally single track, constructed with 36-pound rails. The line was constructed in conjunction with the Beale Memorial Clock Tower (dedicated April 4, 1904) which resided at the intersection of 17th Street and Chester Avenue. In 1910, the company began plans to upgrade the line. With traffic concerns, the city council voted to remove the clock tower. However, after public pressure, they reversed their decision.

In 1912, the entire line was upgraded to 87-pound rails. That same year, the section between 19th Street and 11th Street was double tracked. At the intersection of the clock tower, the rails were shifted to allow travel around it. In 1930, streetcars were operating every 15 minutes. However, revenue for the streetcar line was declining. On July 1, 1939, the line was abandoned and replaced with buses.

== Connections ==
- Santa Fe and Southern Pacific Line (B&KE)

B&KE = Bakersfield and Kern Electric Railway
