= Tehachapi Railroad Depot =

Railway station in Tehachapi, California, United States

Tehachapi
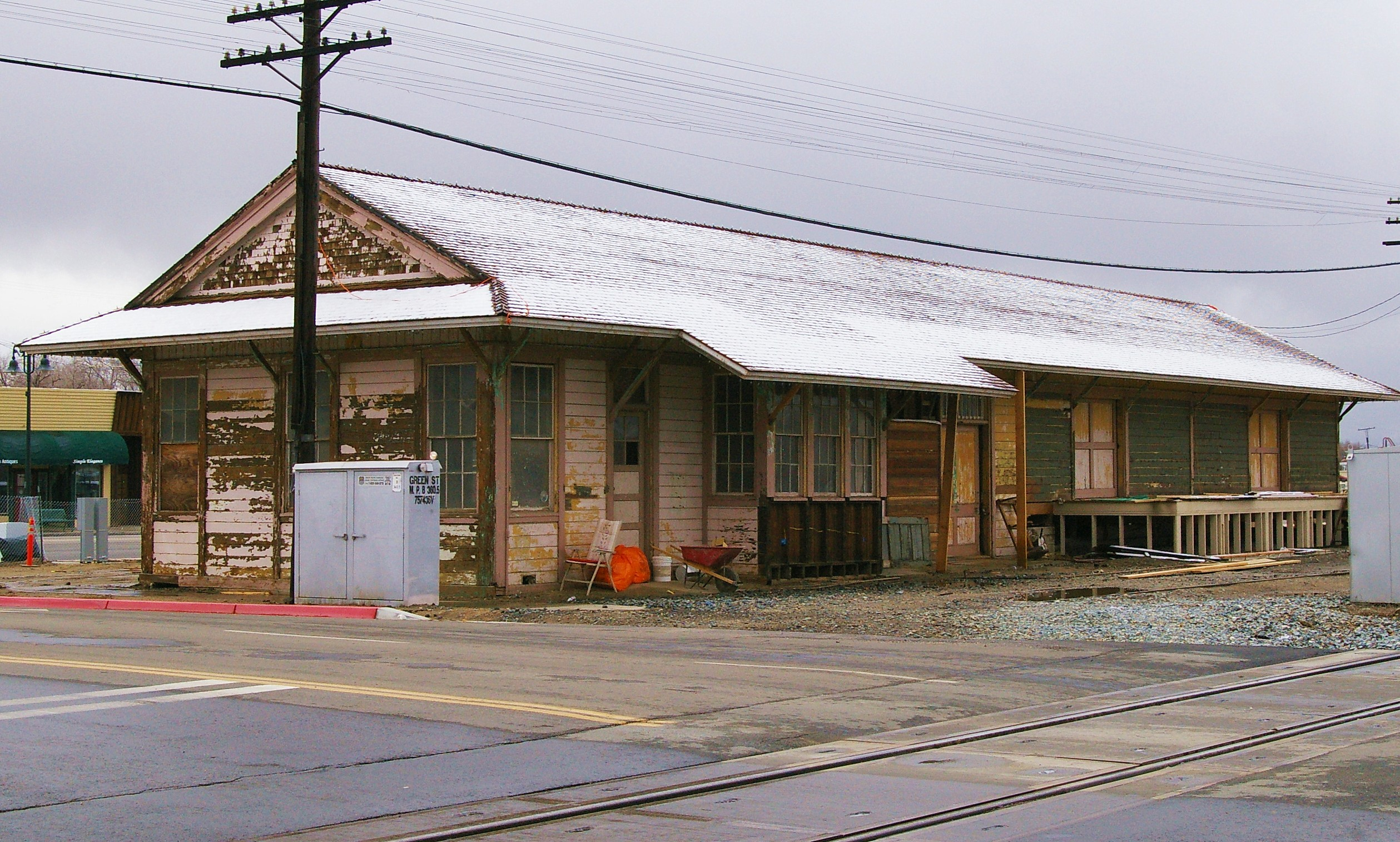
- The station building in January 2008

General information
- Location: 101 West Tehachapi Boulevard; Tehachapi, California

History
- Rebuilt: 1904

Services
Preceding station	Southern Pacific Railroad	Following station
Caliente toward Oakland Pier	San Joaquin Valley Line	Mojave toward Los Angeles
Bakersfield toward Oakland Pier	San Joaquin Daylight	Mojave toward Los Angeles
Bakersfield toward Sacramento	Sacramento Daylight	Mojave toward Los Angeles
- Tehachapi Railroad Depot
- U.S. National Register of Historic Places
- Location within California Location within the United States
- Coordinates: 35°7′57″N 118°26′53″W
- Area: less than one acre
- Built: 1904
- Built by: Southern Pacific Railroad
- Architectural style: Bungalow/craftsman
- NRHP reference No.: 99001263
- Added to NRHP: October 20, 1999
Location

The Tehachapi Railroad Depot was a railroad station in Tehachapi, California. The Southern Pacific Railroad built the line through the area in 1876. The depot was built in 1904 after the original station building was destroyed in a fire. the railroad founded the town of Tehachapi and drew the residents of nearby Tehichipa to the new settlement. The depot served a significant section of railroad, as it was located near the Tehachapi Loop and was one of the most active rural stations during World War II. The station later served as a warehouse and a railroad office.

This railroad that crossed the Tehachapi Summit and came through Tehachapi was the second transcontinental railroad. The museum has a collection of old railroad tools and signals, photos and newspaper articles, lanterns, and dining cart china. Much of this came from the family of Bill Stokoe, a retired railroad worker who died in 1999.

In 2008, the depot burned down; it was rebuilt in 2009 and now serves as the Tehachapi Depot Railroad Museum with historic railroad artifacts.

The original depot was added to the National Register of Historic Places on October 20, 1999. Although the original depot no longer exists, it remains on the National Register.
