= West 19th Street Line =

Electric railway line in Bakersfield, California, U.S.

Overview
- Status: Abandoned
- Locale: Bakersfield, California
- Termini: 19th St / F St; Truxtun Ave / Oak St

Service
- Type: Streetcar
- System: Bakersfield and Kern Electric Railway
- Depot(s): 19th St / Union Ave Car barn (1903–1912, 1920–1933); 19th St / Oak St Car barn (1912–1920)

History
- Opened: 1903
- Closed: August 26, 1933

Technical
- Track gauge: 4 ft 8 1/2 in (1,435 mm) standard gauge
- Electrification: Overhead line, 550 V DC

The West 19th Street Line was a line of the Bakersfield and Kern Electric Railway. The route originated at the intersection of 19th Street and F Street, and traveled west on 19th Street. It would turn south on Oak Street and terminate at Truxtun Avenue. For most of its life, the line was combined with the North Chester Line. The line was constructed in 1903, as part of the original expansion plan. It closed in 1933.

The line originally single track, constructed with 36-pound rails. It would run west on 19th Street to Elm Street. On March 27, 1905, a franchise was granted to extend the line to Oak Street, then turn south and end at Truxtun Avenue. A spur was also constructed at Cedar Street, to run south to 18th Street. That spur was abandoned in 1910.

On 1912, a new Car barn was constructed at the intersection of 19th Street and Oak Street. It was adjacent to the Recreation Park. Operations continued until 1920, when a fire at the park would spread and burn down the car barn. In addition, two streetcars were destroyed (believed to be car 1 and car 8). Operations were relocated back to the 19th Street and Union Avenue Car barn.

Between 1922 and 1930, the Truxtun Avenue section was removed, and the line terminated at Oak Street. The 1930 timetable showed streetcars operating every 20 minutes. However, ridership was declining. On August 26, 1933, the line was abandoned and replaced with buses.

== Connections ==
- Santa Fe and Southern Pacific Line (B&KE)

B&KE = Bakersfield and Kern Electric Railway
