= North Chester Line =

Overview
- Status: Abandoned
- Locale: Bakersfield, California
- Termini: 19th St / Chester Ave; Southern Pacific Chester Station

Service
- Type: Streetcar
- System: Bakersfield and Kern Electric Railway
- Depot(s): 19th St / Union Ave Car barn (1903-1912, 1920-1933); 19th St / Oak St Car barn (1912-1920)

History
- Opened: 1903
- Closed: July 24, 1933

Technical
- Track gauge: 4 ft 8 1/2 in (1,435 mm) standard gauge
- Electrification: Overhead line, 550 V DC

The North Chester Line was a line of the Bakersfield and Kern Electric Railway. The route originated at the intersection of 19th Street and Chester Avenue, and traveled north on Chester. For most of its life, the line was combined with the West 19th Street Line. The line was constructed in 1903, as part of the original expansion plan. It closed in 1933.

The line was originally single track, constructed with 36-pound rails. It would run on Chester Avenue, until 24th Street. It would then, turn east for one block. The line would then turn north again, on K Street. It would continue north and terminate at the Southern Pacific railroad tracks.

In 1911, the line would see two major changes. The K Street section would be realigned to Chester Avenue (terminate at the Southern Pacific Chester Station), making the route straight. Although the franchise, granted to the company, allowed the line to be constructed to 34th Street, it was not constructed north of 32nd Street. This was most likely because of the cost involved in crossing the Southern Pacific tracks. The line was also double tracked and replaced with 87-pound rails.

The 1930 timetable showed trains running every 20 minutes. However, revenue for the streetcar line was declining. On July 24, 1933, the line was abandoned. It would also remove the obstacle to the construction of Garces Circle (which is just south of the Southern Pacific tracks).

== Connections ==
- Santa Fe and Southern Pacific Line (B&KE)
- Southern Pacific Chester Station - with connections to Southern Pacific local routes serving California.

B&KE = Bakersfield and Kern Electric Railway
