= Beale Memorial Clock Tower =

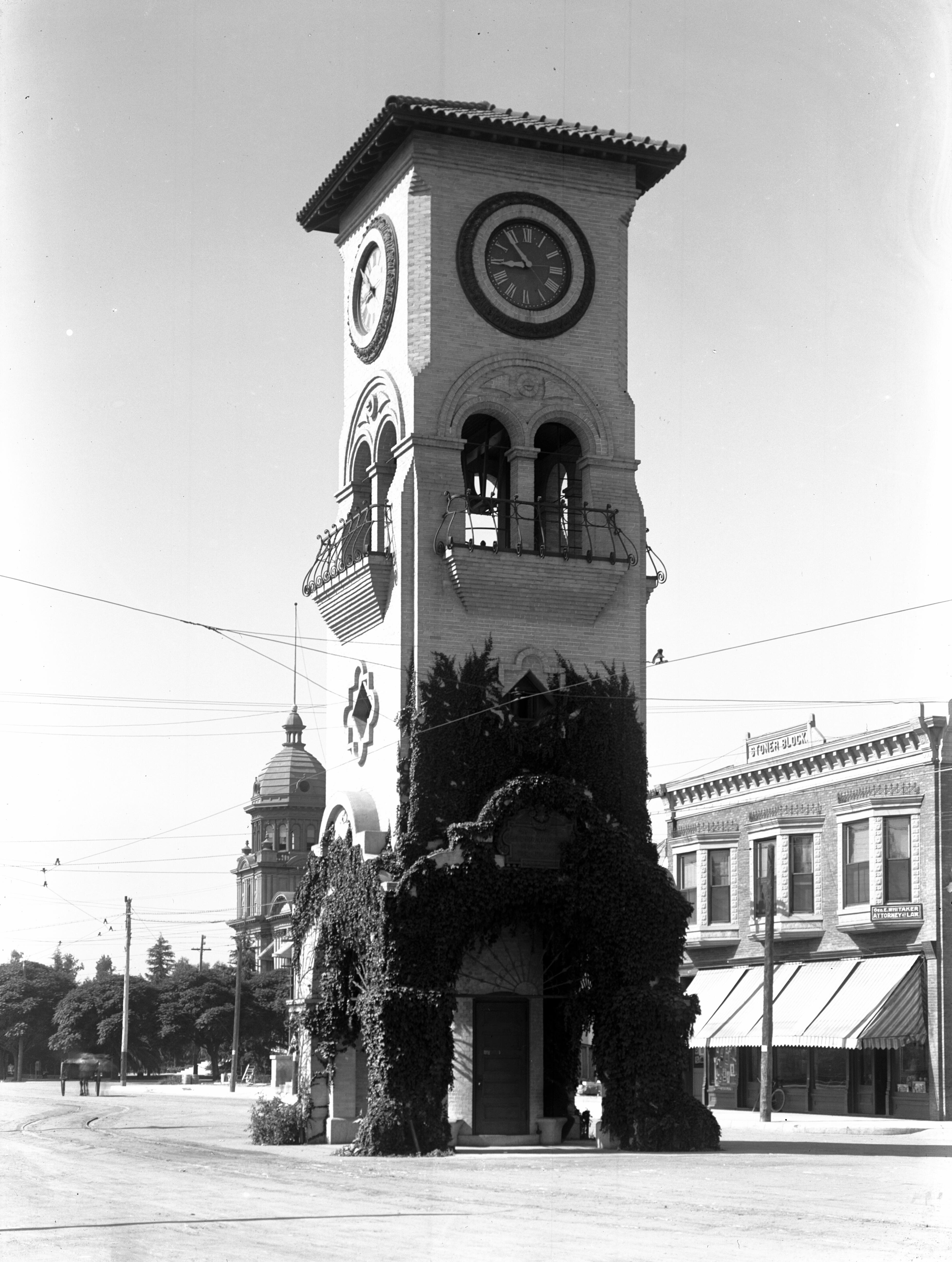
- The original clock tower at the intersection of Chester Ave. and 17th St.
- Location: Bakersfield, California
- Coordinates: 35.374329°N 119.018838°W
- Built: April 4, 1904
- Built for: Memorial to Mary Edwards Beale
- Demolished: 1952
- Rebuilt: December 13, 1964
- Architect: Clinton Day
- Governing body: County of Kern

Beale Memorial Clock Tower is a clock tower located in Bakersfield, California. It was a gift to the city, built by Truxtun Beale in memory of his mother, Mary Edwards Beale, the wife of Edward Fitzgerald Beale. The original clock tower was built in the middle of the intersection of 17th Street and Chester Avenue, and was dedicated on April 4, 1904. The tower was designed by architect Clinton Day, while the clock itself was installed by Frank H. McConnell. The design was inspired by a clock tower that Truxtun Beale has seen while he was the U.S. ambassador to Spain.

On January 22, 1912, the Bakersfield City Council voted to remove the clock tower, because its location in the middle of Chester Avenue was blocking a planned upgrade of the South Chester trolley line. After protest from citizens and consultation with Truxtun Beale, however, the tower was allowed to remain and the tracks were built around it, in spite of the congestion it caused to both trolley and automobile traffic.

The clock tower was badly damaged in the 1952 Kern County earthquake and subsequently demolished. Only the metal elements were saved: the clock works, bell, iron spiral stairwell, balcony railings, and iron grillwork.

In 1961 a group of local citizens organized to build a replica of the tower at a new site. The new tower, which incorporated the metalwork from the old structure, was built in front of the Kern County Museum on Chester Avenue, approximately 1.25 miles north of its original location. It was dedicated on December 13, 1964 to the County of Kern.
