= Bakersfield station (Southern Pacific Railroad) =

Bakersfield
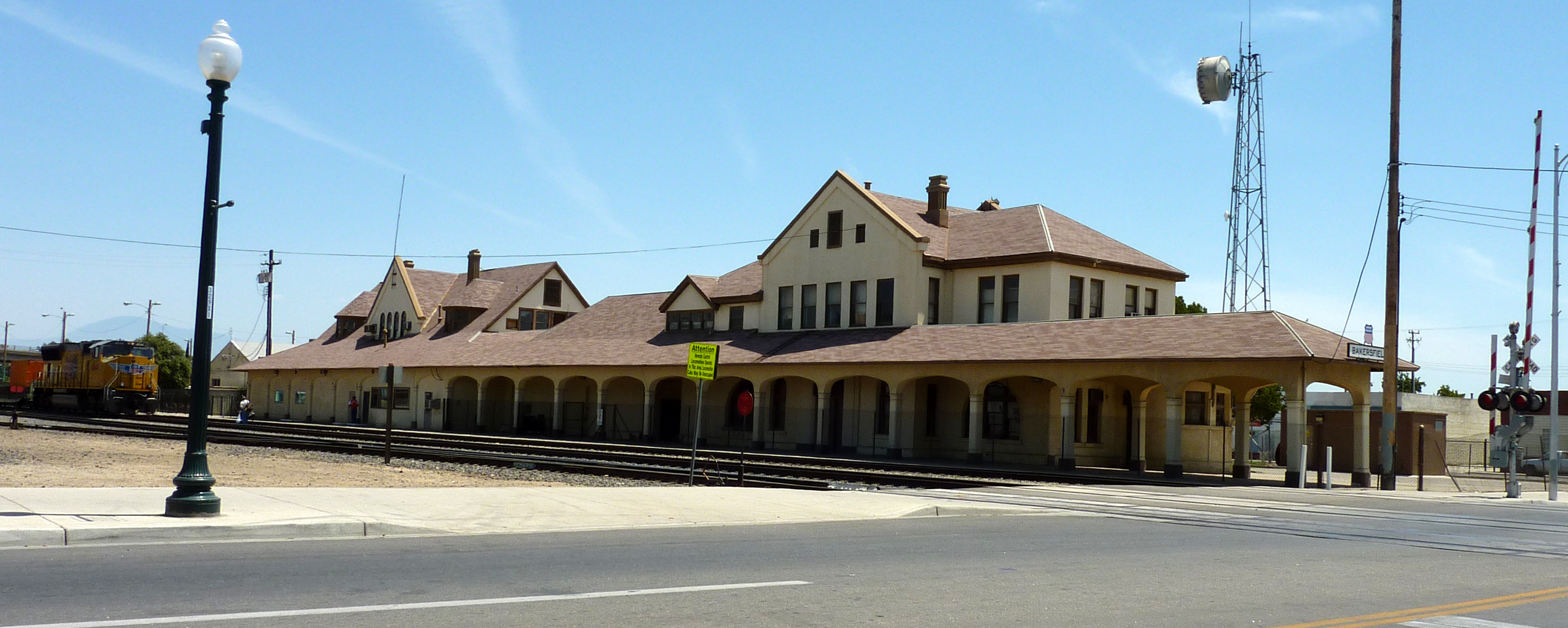
- The station building in 2009

General information
- Location: 700 Sumner Street
- Coordinates: 35°22′37″N 118°59′31″W
- Owner: Union Pacific
- Line: UP Fresno Subdivision
- Platforms: 1 side platform
- Tracks: 1

History
- Opened: June 27, 1889
- Closed: April 30, 1971

Services
| Preceding station | Amtrak | Following station |
|---|---|---|
| Los Angeles Terminus | Coast Starlight detour route | Oakland–Jack London Square toward Seattle |

Former services
| Preceding station | Southern Pacific Railroad | Following station |
|---|---|---|
| Edison toward Los Angeles | San Joaquin Valley Line | Famoso toward Oakland Pier |
| Tehachapi toward Los Angeles | San Joaquin Daylight | Delano toward Sacramento |
| Gosford toward McKittrick | Bakersfield — McKittrick | Terminus |
| Tehachapi toward Los Angeles | Sacramento Daylight | Delano toward Sacramento |
| Preceding station | Bakersfield and Kern Electric Railway | Following station |
| 17th Street / F Street toward Bakersfield | Santa Fe and Southern Pacific Line | Terminus |
Location

Bakersfield station is a former Southern Pacific Railroad station and hotel in Bakersfield, California, United States. The station opened June 27, 1889, in the town of Sumner (which was later annexed by Bakersfield). The station was a mixture of Richardsonian Romanesque, Spanish Colonial Revival, and Moderne styles. It was closed in 1971, after the formation of Amtrak.

The Sumner station served Southern Pacific passenger trains that ran on the San Joaquin Valley Route, including the San Joaquin Daylight, Sacramento Daylight, Owl Limited, and West Coast. It has been used as an office building and crew change center by Union Pacific. On extremely rare occasions, it is used as a stop for the Coast Starlight when Union Pacific's Coast Line is closed.

== History ==
=== Original station ===
In 1874, construction of the Southern Pacific Railroad line had reached the Southern San Joaquin Valley. Bakersfield was the logical stop for the railroad, but a land dispute had developed between the town and Southern Pacific. (Note: Southern Pacific claimed that the station location was a result of "engineering requirements" in building the rail line.) It resulted in the railroad building its tracks about 2 miles east of the town. The town of Sumner was laid out by the railroad. It also constructed a small depot. In 1888 the Bakersfield and Sumner Railroad (which later became the Bakersfield and Kern Electric Railway) was constructed to the station. It provided a connection between the station and the Courthouse in Bakersfield.

=== Second station ===
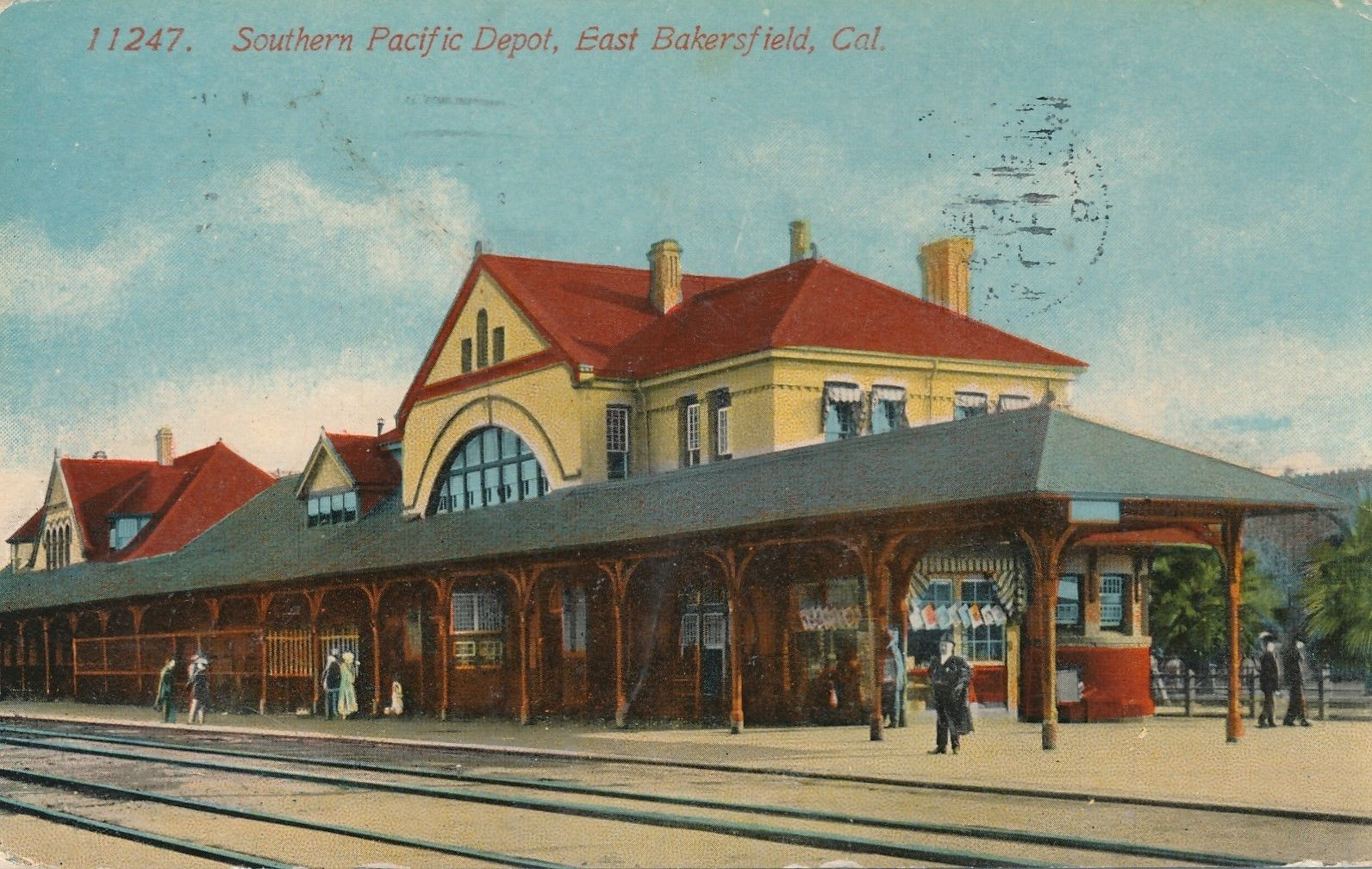
1913 postcard of the station

In 1889, a new railroad station was constructed. The station was originally built in the Richardsonian Romanesque style with both a train station and a hotel. One of the station's most defining features was the long arcade, that stretched along the entire north side, connecting the station and the hotel. That same year, the Bakersfield and Kern Electric Railway moved its main line (called the Santa Fe and Southern Pacific Line) to the Santa Fe Bakersfield Station.

In the late 1930s, Southern Pacific was considering demolishing the station in favor of a new design. It instead decided to remodel the station. Most of the ornamental features were removed in an effort to provide a more streamlined appearance. The result was a transformation to the Spanish Colonial Revival style. It did retain the steeply pitched roof.

=== Disuse ===
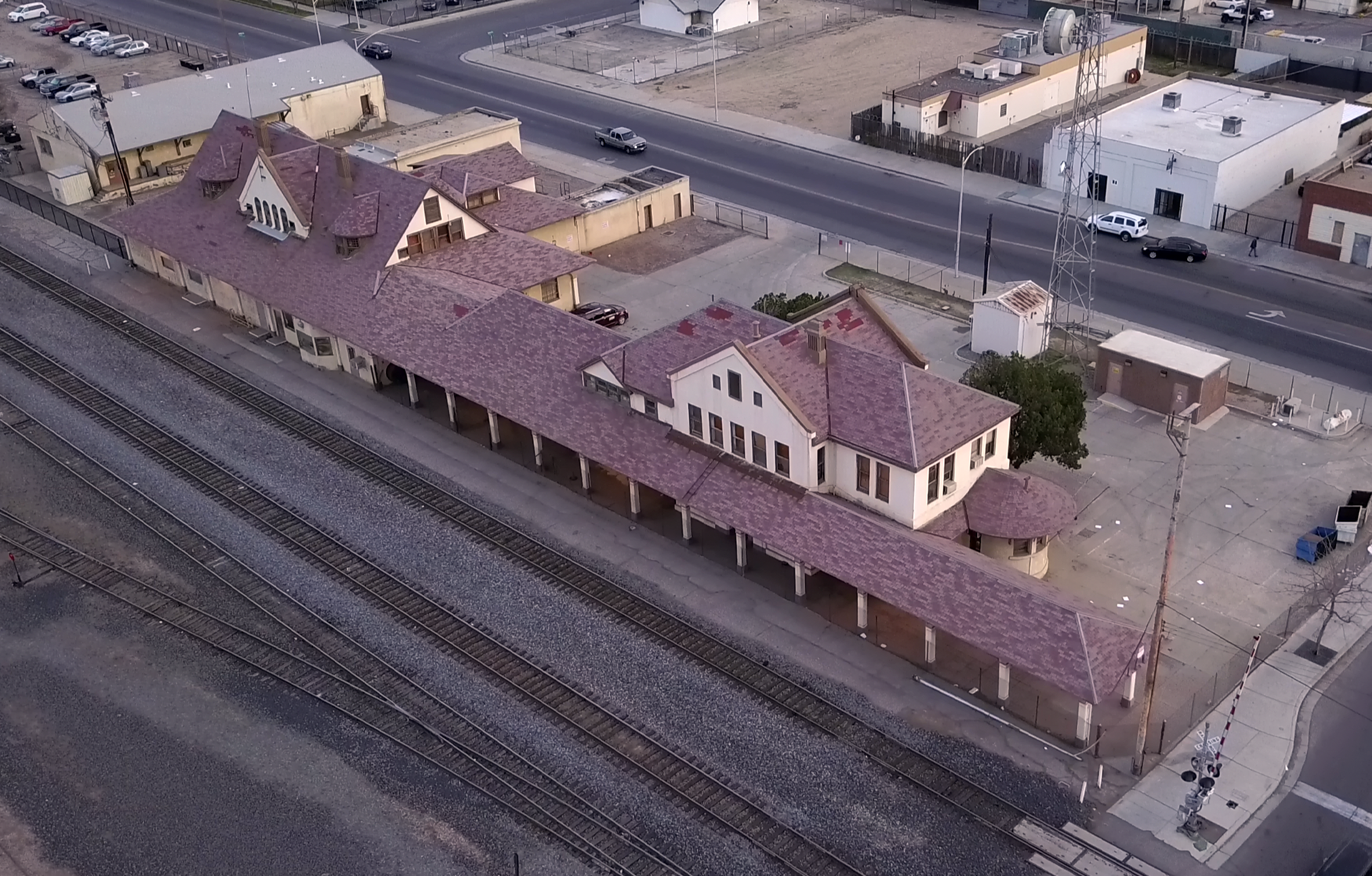
Aerial view

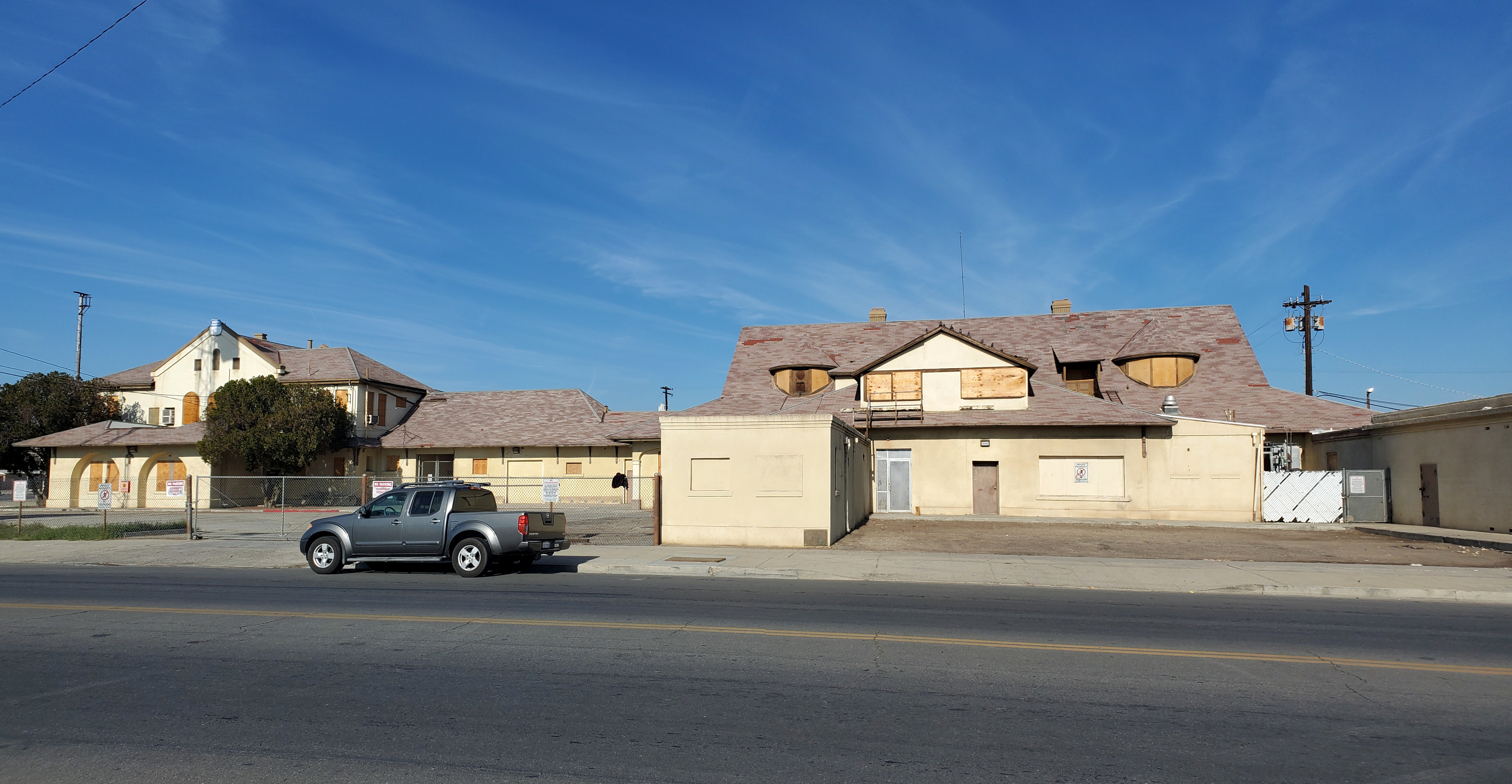
The disused station (left) and hotel in 2021

At some point, the hotel closed and was converted to office space. In addition, half of the portico (on the hotel side) was enclosed. In 1971, Amtrak was formed. That would end the remaining Southern Pacific passenger trains through the station. The station was subsequently closed. The office portion would continue to be used by Southern Pacific, and later by Union Pacific.

Union Pacific replaced the offices in the station with a separate building nearby in 2021. In March 2021, a city council member said the railroad planned to demolish the former station, while the railroad said a decision had not yet been made.

Plans for two new rail systems have been proposed, both considering a future stop in East Bakersfield, near the station. Kern County has been studying the possibility of a future regional commuter rail system. Part of the system would use existing Union Pacific tracks. In addition, Bakersfield has also been studying for a future light rail system. Both systems have a start date beyond 2025.
