= Owl Limited =

Former passenger train service in California

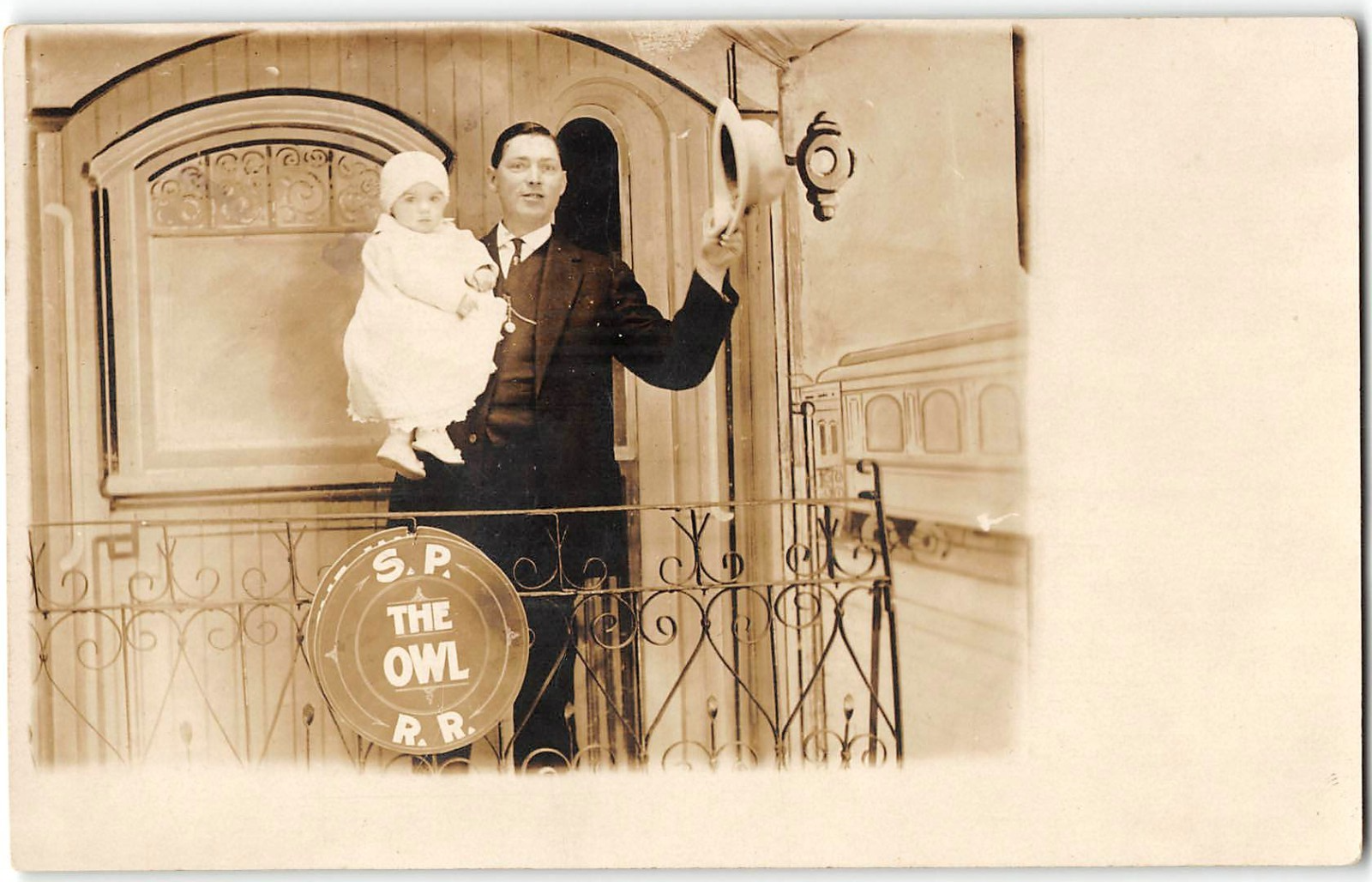
- c. 1910 postcard of passengers on the Owl

Overview
- Service type: Inter-city rail
- Status: Discontinued
- Locale: California
- First service: December 18, 1898
- Last service: April 11, 1965
- Former operator: Southern Pacific

Route
- Termini: Oakland, California; Los Angeles, California
- Service frequency: Daily
- Train numbers: 25 (southbound), 26 (northbound)

Technical
- Track gauge: 1,435 mm (4 ft 8 1/2 in)

The Owl Limited was an overnight passenger train of the Southern Pacific Company which ran between Oakland and Los Angeles via the Central Valley. The service was inaugurated on December 18, 1898. The train was canceled after April 11, 1965, with as few as 15 passengers per day using the service.

The train operated with several classes of sleeping cars, coaches, chair cars, and a diner.
