= F Street and H Street Loop =

Overview
- Status: Abandoned
- Locale: Bakersfield, California
- Termini: Santa Fe Bakersfield Station; 19th Street / H Street

Service
- Type: Streetcar
- System: Bakersfield and Kern Electric Railway
- Depot(s): 19th St / Union Ave Car barn (1903–1912, 1920–1922); 19th St / Oak St Car barn (1912–1920)

History
- Opened: 1903
- Closed: Between 1909 and 1922

Technical
- Line length: 0.89 mi (1.43 km)
- Track gauge: 4 ft 8 1/2 in (1,435 mm) standard gauge
- Electrification: Overhead line, 550 V DC

The F Street and H Street Loop was a line of the Bakersfield and Kern Electric Railway. It originally operated as a loop on F Street and H Street, between 19th Street and California Avenue. The line was constructed in 1903, as part of the original expansion plan. The exact date the line was closed, and converted to buses is not known. However, the line was upgraded in 1909, and was not operating in 1922.

The line was originally single track, constructed with 36-pound rails. In 1909, the rails were upgraded to 87-pound rails. The line was also double tracked for its entire length. The switch at 19th Street and H Street was not replaced in the upgrade, and was abandoned. This converted the loop into a line, although it would still be called a loop. This also reduced the route to simply Santa Fe Bakersfield Station to 19th Street/H Street.

== Connections ==
- Santa Fe and Southern Pacific Line (B&KE)
- Westpark Bus Line (B&KE) - Feeder bus route serving areas southwest of the station.
- Santa Fe Bakersfield Station - with connections to Santa Fe express routes serving the San Joaquin Valley.

B&KE = Bakersfield and Kern Electric Railway
