= Valley Plaza Mall =

Shopping mall in Bakersfield, California

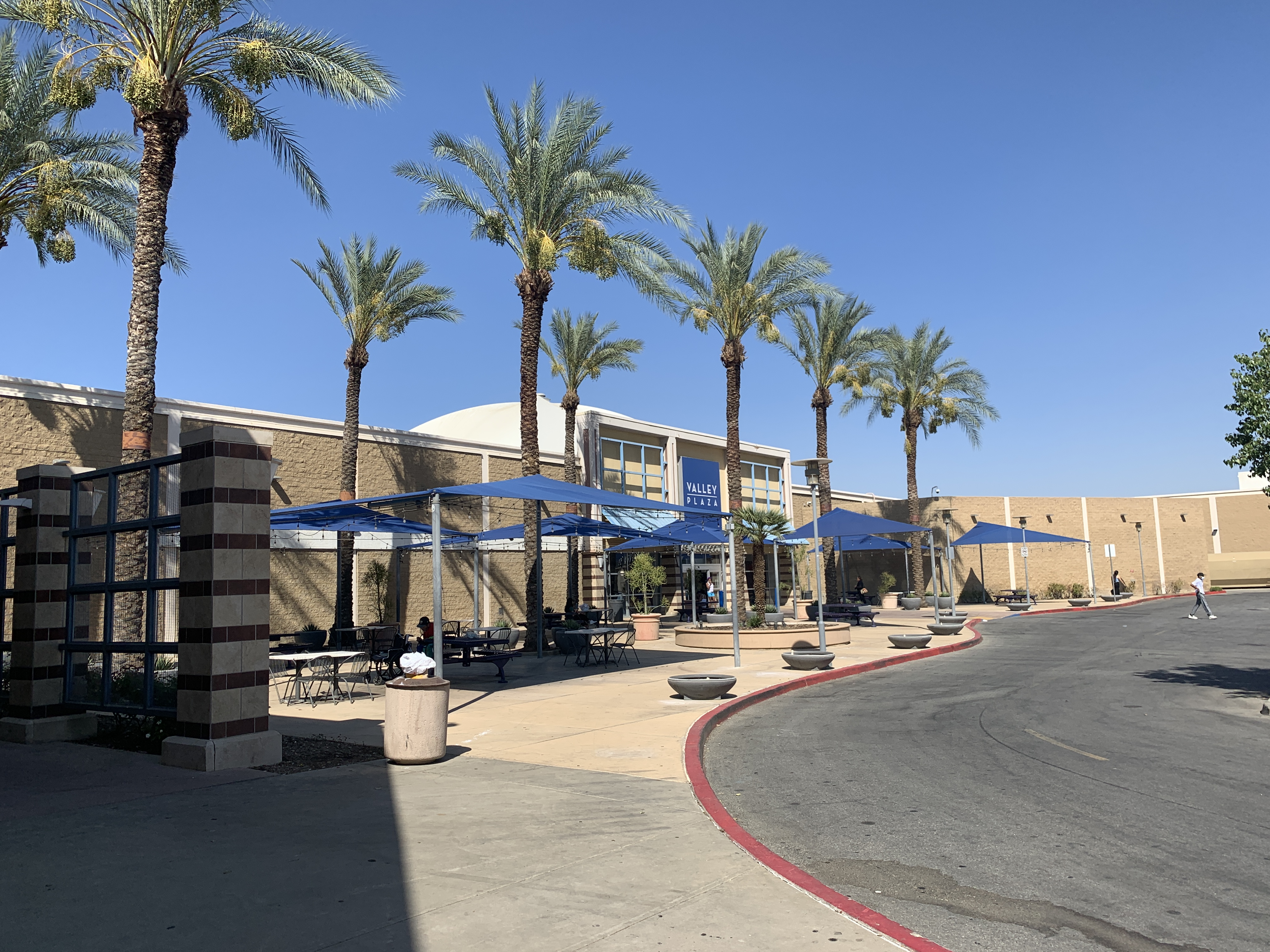
- Location: Bakersfield, California
- Coordinates: 35.338°N 119.034°W
- Address: 2701 Ming Avenue, Bakersfield, CA 93304
- Opened: February 21, 1967; 59 years ago
- Developer: The Hahn Company
- Manager: Brookfield Properties
- Owner: GGP
- Num. of stores: 143
- Num. of anchor tenants: 5 (3 open, 2 vacant)
- Floor area: 1,174,947 square feet (109,156.1 m^{2})
- Floors: 1 (2 in JCPenney, Parking Garage, and former Sears, 3 in Macy's)
- Parking: 5,504
- Website: valleyplazamall.com

Valley Plaza Mall is a shopping mall in Bakersfield, California. It is the largest mall in the San Joaquin Valley. The mall is situated near California State Route 99, the city's main north–south freeway. Anchor stores are JCPenney, Macy's, and Target.

== History ==
Valley Plaza Mall opened in 1967. The mall was originally developed by The Hahn Company of San Diego in partnership with John Brock Sr. of Brock's Department Stores. The mall originally had 900,000 square feet (84,000 m^{2}) of retail space and three anchor stores: Sears, The Broadway, and Brock's. The original interior was described as "reflects the Spanish influence on Southern California in a contemporary manner".

In 1986, the mall began expanding, adding "wings" (which increased the mall to its current size) on the east end in 1986, and the west in 1988. Two new anchor stores were added: JCPenney (1986) and May Company (1988). The Oasis Food Court was also constructed. In 1999, Pacific Theatres opened a 16-screen theater on the property, but detached from the mall. The theater would later be taken over by Reading Cinemas in the late-2000s with two screens being retrofitted to IMAX and Reading's premium Titan LUXE format in 2015 and 2025 respectively. The theater also contains a mural in the lobby featuring the poster for This Is Cinerama with the Bakersfield Sign towering above in one of the first large public displays of the sign since its 1999 remodel.

The anchor stores saw many changes. Only JCPenney has remained since they originally opened. Broadway was acquired by Macy's. Brock's was purchased by Gottschalks, which later closed and became occupied by Forever 21. May Company became Robinsons-May, and it closed and eventually was demolished and replaced by Target. Valley Plaza Mall is the site of the Southwest Transit Center, which has a stop for the following Golden Empire Transit (GET) routes: 2, 6, 7, 8, 10, 11, 13, and 15.

On October 15, 2018, it was announced that Sears would be closing as part of a plan to close 142 stores nationwide. The store closed on January 6, 2019.

On March 21, 2025, it was announced that Forever 21 will be closing as part of a plan to close all locations in the US, which will leave JCPenney, Macy's, and Target as the mall's remaining anchors.
