= Taft Area Transit =

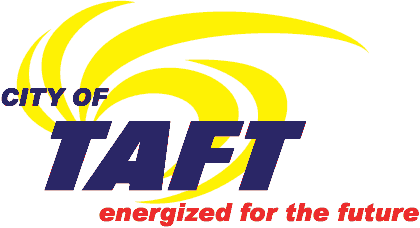
- Headquarters: 209 East Kern Street
- Locale: Taft, CA
- Service area: Taft and Maricopa
- Service type: Bus service
- Routes: 3
- Fuel type: Diesel

Taft Area Transit is the operator of mass transportation in Taft, California. Two routes operate within the city, which serve most of the urban development. There is also an additional route which runs between Taft and Maricopa. The routes operate in a loop, with no central hub.
