= Arvin Transit =

Mass transit operator located in California

- Headquarters: 165 Plumtree Drive
- Locale: Arvin, CA
- Service area: Arvin, Lamont
- Service type: bus service
- Routes: 4
- Hubs: Transit Hub
- Fleet: 8
- Fuel type: Diesel, battery electric
- Website: www.arvin.org

Arvin Transit is the operator of mass transportation in Arvin, California. Four routes operate in and around the city, which serves most of the urban development. There are additional routes which connect Arvin with Lamont, and the Tejon Industrial Complex. There is one transit hub, located at the intersection of Bear Mountain Boulevard and Plumtree Drive.

== Service overview ==
=== Local & Express Routes ===
| Route | Terminals | | via |
|---|---|---|---|
| Arvin Local | Arvin Arvin Transit Center | | Derby St, Franklin St, Meyer St, Sycamore Rd, Walnut St Comanche Dr, Varsity Rd |
| Arvin-Lamont | Arvin Arvin Transit Center | | Derby St, Sycamore Rd, Comanche Dr, Di Giorgio Rd, Main St, SR 223 |
| Arvin-Bakersfield | Arvin Arvin Transit Center | | Comanche Dr, SR 58, Mt Vernon Av, SR 99, SR 223 |
| Arvin-Tejon | Arvin Arvin Transit Center | Wheeler Ridge Tejon Ranch Industrial Complex | SR 223, I-5 |

Arvin Transit and Dial-A-Ride service do not operate on most public holidays.

== Bus fleet ==
=== Active fleet ===
| Make/Model | Fleet numbers | Year | Engine | Transmission |
|---|---|---|---|---|
| Ford E-450 Glaval | 110 | 2010 | | |
| Ford E-450 Glaval | 203, 207 | 2011 | | |
| Proterra Catalyst BE35 | 203-EV, 205-EV, 207-EV | 2019 | | |
| Freightliner Chassis S2 35 | 209 | 2013 | Cummins ISL9 EPA10 | Allison 2500 PTS |
| Freightliner Chassis S2C 35 | 211 | 2014 | Cummins ISL9 EPA13 | Allison 2500 PTS |
