= Golden Empire Transit =

Bus transport system in Bakersfield, California, U.S.

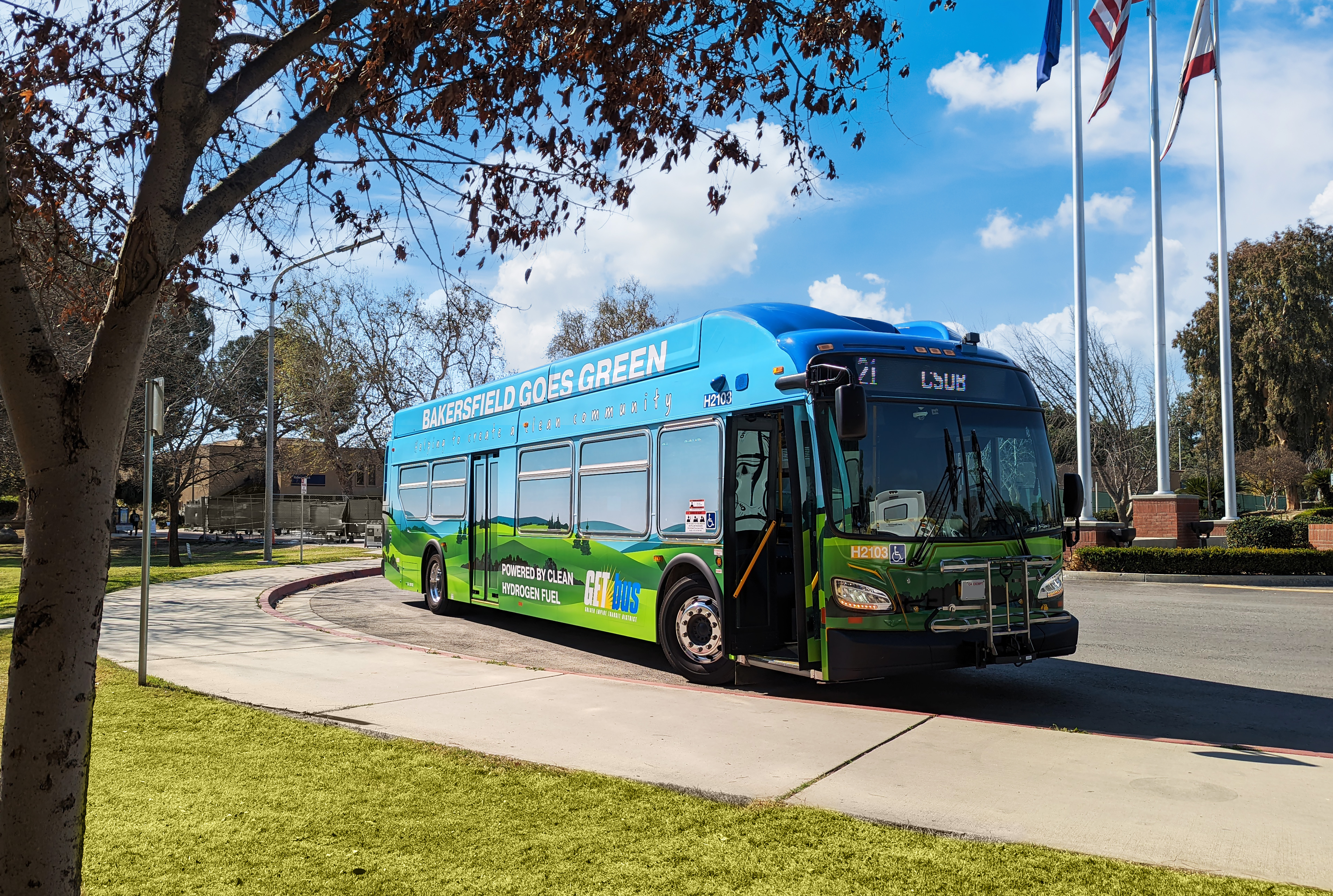
- A Hydrogen Fuel Bus at the CSUB Transit Center
- Parent: Golden Empire Transit District
- Founded: 1973
- Headquarters: 1830 Golden State Avenue
- Locale: Bakersfield, California
- Service area: Greater Bakersfield
- Service type: bus service
- Routes: 16
- Stops: 1,600
- Hubs: Downtown Transit Center; Southwest Transit Center; Bakersfield College; CSUB
- Fleet: 90 standard CNG buses 10 Hydrogen Buses; 49 On-Demand vehicles
- Daily ridership: 15,900 (weekdays, Q3 2025)
- Annual ridership: 3,817,300 (2024)
- Fuel type: CNG, Hydrogen fuel
- Website: getbus.org

Golden Empire Transit is the operator of mass transportation in Bakersfield, California. There are 16 routes serving Greater Bakersfield, which includes both the City of Bakersfield and adjacent unincorporated communities. Since 2005, almost the entire bus fleet has been powered by compressed natural gas. In 2021, 5 hydrogen buses were added to the fleet, with an additional 5 planned for purchase in the future. In 2024, the system had a ridership of 3,817,300, or about 15,900 per weekday as of the third quarter of 2025.

The government agency is an independent transit agency and is not directly associated with either the City of Bakersfield or the County of Kern. However, it co-ordinates with both the city and county, as well as the Kern Council of Governments (which represents most local governments in the county). It is also the direct descendant of the Bakersfield and Kern Electric Railway, which originally provided streetcar service to the city.

== History ==
Prior to the mid-1950s, public transportation in Bakersfield was provided by a private company named the Bakersfield Transit Company (formerly the Bakersfield and Kern Electric Railway). However, yearly losses resulted in the city acquiring it in 1956, under the new name Bakersfield Transit Agency. The city made little investments in the system. Already suffering from deferred maintenance from the previous owner, the lack of investment resulted in the system sinking into further disrepair. Operating losses were also increasing.

In 1973, voters approved a measure which established the Golden Empire Transit District. It would take over ownership and operation of the Bakersfield Transit Agency. The new transit district started purchasing new equipment. It also eliminated unnecessary routes. In 1986, the transit authority would undergo its first major alteration in the system. Previously, routes were running in circular routes. The company changed to a crosstown system. Buses operated on linear paths, and generally looped back when the bus needed to change direction. They also operated between transit hubs. The first was located downtown (Downtown Transit Center). Later a second was added at the Valley Plaza Mall, in the Southwest (Southwest Transit Center). A third transit center was built in 2011 on Panorama Drive at Bakersfield College. Golden Empire Transit implemented a new system of routes on October 7, 2012. The system transitioned from a crosstown system to an express/local system. Although the agency divides the system into five categories, it is easier to describe it in three: Express, Rapid, and Local. Express service runs between major destinations on the most direct route. It also makes a limited number of stops. Rapid service runs more frequently than express and makes more stops between end points. Local routes stop most frequently. Routes have been straightened for faster service. In 2021, GET opened a transit center at Cal State Bakersfield.

== Routes ==
=== Local routes ===
Routes that begin with either a "4" or a "6" are Local routes. Technically, Golden Empire Transit defines routes that begin with a "6" as Circulation routes, but they operate the same; except for the headway. Local routes make frequent stops. Routes that start with a "4" run every 30 minutes while routes that start with a "6" run every hour.

Route	Terminals		via	Notes
41	Bakersfield Southwest Transit Center	Bakersfield Bakersfield College	SR 99, Mt. Vernon Av, University Av	
42	Bakersfield GET Offices	Bakersfield Walmart	21st St, Oak St, Monitor St	Serves Downtown Transit Center and Southwest Transit Center
43	Bakersfield Office Park Dr & Commercial Wy	Bakersfield Bakersfield College	Truxtun Av, Q St, Columbus St	
44	Bakersfield McNair Ln & Gosford Rd	Bakersfield Bakersfield College	White Ln, Union Av, Mt. Vernon Av	
45	Oildale Chester Av & China Grade Loop	Bakersfield Morning Dr & Pioneer Dr	McCray St, Truxtun Av, Niles St	Serves Downtown Transit Center
46	Bakersfield Village La & Stockdale Hwy	Bakersfield Morning Dr & Pioneer Dr	Stockdale Hwy, 4th St, Virginia Av, Pioneer Dr	
47	Bakersfield Office Park Dr & Commercial Wy	Bakersfield Walmart	New Stine Rd, Panama Ln	
61	Bakersfield Stine Rd & Maybrook Av	Bakersfield Bakersfield College	Harris Rd, Gosford Rd, Coffee Rd, Olive Dr, Columbus Av	Serves Cal State Bakersfield Transit Center
62	Bakersfield Southwest Transit Center	Bakersfield Akers Rd & Panama Ln	Hughes Ln, H St, Hosking Av, Stine Rd	

=== Rapid routes ===
Routes that begin with a "2" are Rapid routes. They make fewer stops than local and express routes, but run more frequently. Rapid routes run every 15 minutes.

Route	Terminals		via	Notes
21	Bakersfield Cal State Bakersfield Transit Center	Bakersfield Bakersfield College	Stockdale Hwy, California Av, Mt. Vernon Av	
22	Bakersfield Cal State Bakersfield Transit Center	Oildale Chester Av & China Grade Loop	Ming Av, Chester Av	Serves Southwest Transit Center and Downtown Transit Center

=== Express routes ===
Routes that begin with an "8" are Express-Circulator routes. This group can generally be considered in two categories. Route 81 operates as in express for its entire length, stopping only at transit centers. Routes 82 and 84 run as express routes between the Downtown Transit Center and NW Promenade on Rosedale, and run local beyond the NW Promemade hub. Route 83 operates as in local for its entire length, making frequent stops. All four routes run either every 30 minutes, 45 minutes, or every hour.

Route	Terminals		via	Notes
81	Bakersfield Southwest Transit Center	Bakersfield Bakersfield College	SR 99, SR 178	Serves Downtown Transit Center
82	Bakersfield Cal State Bakersfield Transit Center	Bakersfield Downtown Transit Center	Stockdale Hwy, Rosedale Hwy	
83	Bakersfield Half Moon Dr & Ashe Rd	Bakersfield Wilson Rd & Fremont St	Wilson Rd	Serves Southwest Transit Center
84	Bakersfield Frontier High School	Bakersfield Downtown Transit Center	Old Farm Rd, Hagaman Rd, Rosedale Hwy	

=== Long-Distance Express routes ===
Routes that begin with a "9" are Long-Distance Express routes. They generally connect Bakersfield with large industrial centers (or other areas of large employment) outside of the city. They make only a few stops in Bakersfield, and then make no additional stops until reaching the industrial center. It will then make frequent stops within the center. Long-distance Express routes run every 2 hours, and generally do not run in the evenings. There is only one route in the system, X92.This route has an "X" before the route number. A Regular Day Pass for the Route X92 is $6.00. And a Monthly pass is $55.00. This route operates almost like the old service Route 16, it runs from Downtown Bakersfield to Tejon Ranch/IKEA, then comes back and ends service until 5:00PM at the Downtown Transit Center(Bakersfield). This route now parks in Bay F, in the Downtown Transit Center.

Route	Terminals		via	Notes
92	Bakersfield Downtown Transit Center	Wheeler Ridge Industrial Pkwy Dr & IKEA	SR 99	

== Transit centers ==
=== Downtown Transit Center ===
The Downtown Transit Center is the transit center primarily serving Northwest, North and East Bakersfield. It is located in Downtown Bakersfield, in between Chester Avenue and Eye Street, on 22nd Street. It is the largest transit center in the system, encompassing 1/2 of a city block. It has 15 off-street bus parking spaces. The transit center is staffed and includes restrooms, and shaded outdoor waiting areas. The transit center was constructed in the mid-1980s.

In addition to Golden Empire Transit, Kern Regional Transit also uses the transit center for one of its hubs. They currently have 6 routes that stop at it, although not all routes run 7-days a week. Their buses stop on the south side of the transit center.

=== Southwest Transit Center ===
The Southwest Transit Center is the transit center primarily serving Southwest, South, and Southeast Bakersfield. It is located on 1912 Wible Road south of Ming Avenue, directly adjacent to Valley Plaza Mall. It has 7 off-street bus parking spaces. The transit center is unstaffed, except for security, and contains restrooms and shaded waiting areas.

The transit center was constructed in the mid-1990s. In addition, two bus routes stop on Wible Road, north of the transit center. There is no room for expansion. In the past, it had been suggested moving the transit center to a new location, but those plans have been shelved in favor of other priorities.

=== Bakersfield College Transit Center ===
This transit center is located on Panorama Drive adjacent to Bakersfield College. It has 8 off-street parking spaces. Six spaces are currently used by GET and one is used by Kern Regional Transit. The transit center is unstaffed and contains restrooms and shaded waiting areas.

=== CSUB Transit Center ===
The California State University Bakersfield Transit Center finished construction in April 2021 located off Don Hart Drive West. The transit center contains 6 bus bays being used by GET and one is used by Kern Regional Transit. The center also contains new lighting and security measures. The center has no unpaid parking; visitors must park in one of CSUB's parking lots. It is walking distance to the Icardo Center.

== Services ==
=== Bicycle transportation ===
All Golden Empire Transit buses are equipped with bike racks. Each rack can hold two bicycles. If the rack is full, the driver may allow bicycles to be carried on the bus, if there is room. Otherwise, bicycle riders must wait for the next bus. Most bus stops and all transit centers do not have bicycle racks or storage lockers.

To complement the bus system, there is also a network of bike paths and bike lanes. The Kern River Bike Path is a dedicated bike path that runs along the Kern River in the Kern River Parkway. It travels through almost the entire length of the city. Several spur routes diverge from the bike path, serving other locations such as California State University, Bakersfield. In addition, many one-mile (1.6 km) spaced arterials have dedicated, striped bike lanes. The width of the lane depends on whether on-street parking is allowed.

=== The Reading Express ===
The Reading Express is a program provided by Golden Empire Transit. Most buses are equipped with a small library of books for children from infant through third grade. The program is design for parents to read with their children while riding together on the bus. This also promotes education, as well as providing entertainment while traveling. Books can not be borrowed and must remain on the bus.

== Fare and fare collection ==
The following are Golden Empire Transit fares, effective January 1, 2023 (children below 6 ride for free with fare-paying rider, limit is 3):

Regular Fares
Fare Type	Regular	Reduced Fare	Premium Express
Single Ride	$1.65	$0.80	$4.00
Day Pass	$3.55	$1.70	$8.00
15 Day Pass	$38.00	$15.00	
31 Day Pass	$57.00	$28.00	$75.00

On-Demand Microtransit Fares
Mileage	Price
0 to 3 Miles	$3.00
3+ to 7 Miles	$5.00
7+ to 10 Miles	$7.00
10+ to 12 Miles	$10.00
12+ Miles	$15.00

On-Demand Reduced Fare
Milage	Price
0 to 3 Miles	$2.00
3+ to 5 Miles	$3.00
5+ to 7 Miles	$4.00
7+ Miles	$5.00

On-Demand Paratransit rides are available for $3.00 a ride, no matter the distance, however, like On-Demand Reduced Fare, the customer must have an application on file in order to ride for the $3.00 fare price.

Golden Empire Transit currently uses GFI Odyssey fare box machines on its standard buses. They validate all US Coins and paper money through $20 bill, although it does not accept pennies nor give change. It also validates all ride passes used on fixed routes.

There are several features of the Odyssey machines that GET are not currently using, but could be implemented in the future. They include: processing credit cards, providing change in the form of printing pre-paid cards, deducting from pre-paid cards, and printing/validating transfer slips. Some of these features would require changes to GET's fare structure.

GET ride passes can be purchased with a variety methods. They can be bought in person at the Downtown Transit Center or GET headquarters on Golden State Avenue. They are also available at a variety of partner retail stores throughout the city (listed on their web site). Passes can also be purchased by mail or by phone. Since 2018 fares are also available to purchase in the Token Transit mobile ticketing app.

== Fleet ==
Golden Empire Transit's bus fleet generally consist of two types of buses, 40' standard buses for fix routes and 21' for demand buses (On-Demand service). The majority of the fleet is powered by compressed natural gas, with 10 buses that are fueled with Hydrogen Fuel Cells. The standard buses have a 38-seat capacity, and a low floor design to assist with handicapped passengers. The On-Demand vehicles have a 9-seat capacity, and the cutaway vehicles a wheelchair lift in the rear.

As part of its 2009 rebranding, GET is transitioned to a new bus color scheme. The paint scheme is blue, with a green bottom. A wavy yellow line separates the blue and green space. Near the front, the green section is wide enough for the "sunburst" GET logo. Only the newer buses have it. The older paint scheme is entirely white, with a red strip through the center. There is a break in the line for the old "fast transit" GET logo, which was in use from 1973–2009. As of 2015, certain routes have been changed, and the bus stops have been labelled with extra information. And GET partnered with the Transit app to locate where the bus is.

In addition, GET owns a variety of service vehicles. These range from sedans, to pickup trucks, to small flat bed trucks. There is also one tow truck in the fleet. These vehicles are generally numbered between 1 and 99.

In late 2022, GET opened the first Hydrogen Fueling station in Kern County on their property. The hydrogen fueling station fuels up the agency's 10 hydrogen buses.

== Maintenance facility ==
Golden Empire Transit's Maintenance Facility is located on Golden State Highway, next to the Kern River (on the north frontage road). GET moved here after outgrowing the previous facility located on 16th Street adjacent to the Oak Street bridge. The current location also contains the headquarters for the transit authority. In addition to containing parking for the entire fleet, it also contains maintenance shops, bus wash, and cleaning facilities.

== Future ==
Golden Empire Transit is currently planning to move their facilities to a new location off of Mt. Vernon Ave. The California High Speed Rail Authority plans to take over the space currently operated by GET on F St. and Golden State Ave. in the future.

GET is also preparing to fulfil their mission of being completely zero emission by 2040. GET constructed a hydrogen fueling station on site to fuel their growing hydrogen bus fleet.
