= East Bakersfield =

- Region in Bakersfield
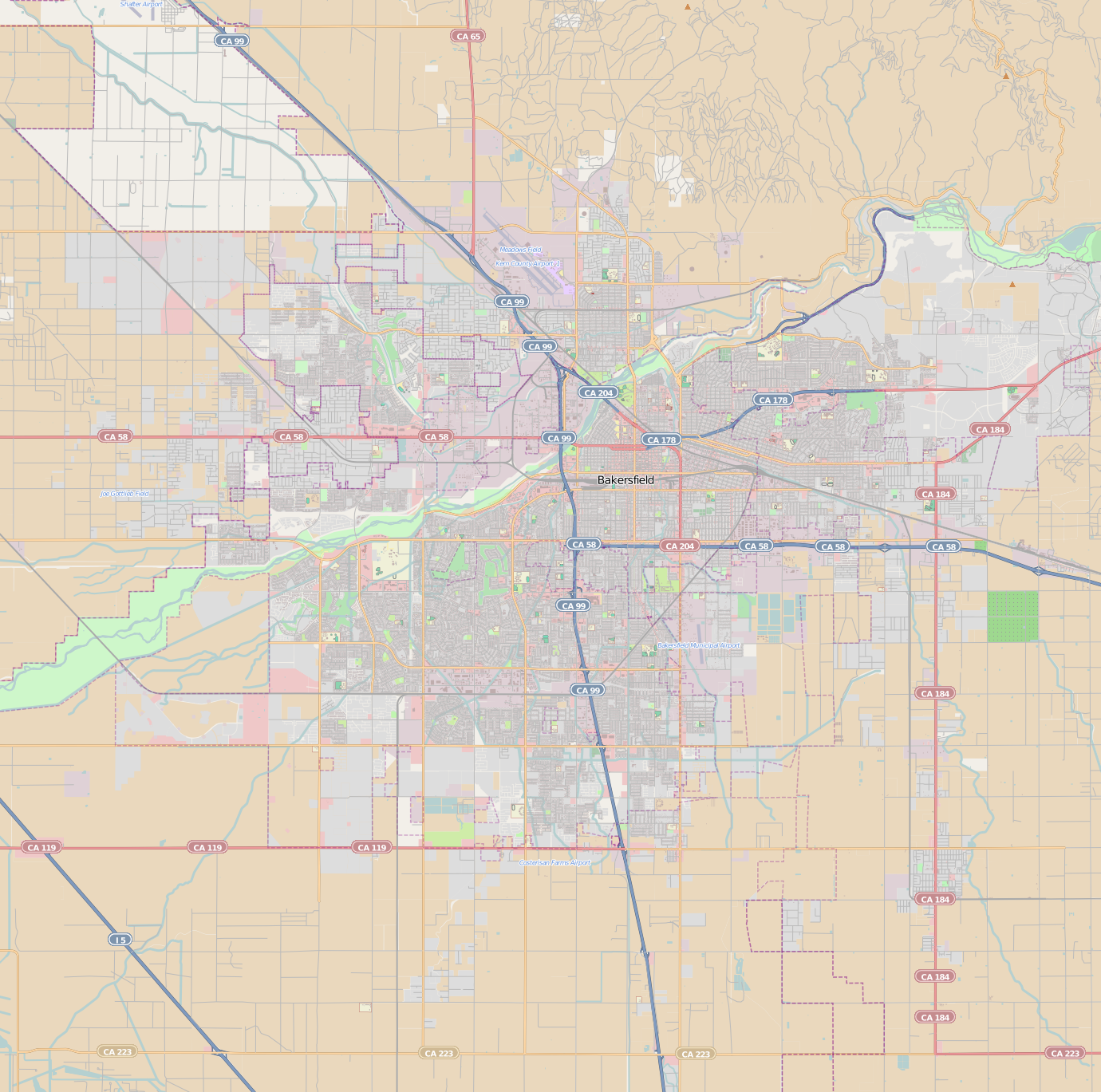
- Location within Bakersfield
- Coordinates: 35°22′59″N 118°59′6″W
- Country: United States
- State: California
- County: County of Kern
- City: City of Bakersfield
- Founded: 1876
- Incorporated: 1892
- Annexed: 1910
- Subdistricts of East Bakersfield: List: Old Town Kern

Area
  - Total: 4.00 sq mi (10.4 km^{2})
- ZIP Code: 93305
- Area Code: 661

East Bakersfield is the eastern region of the city of Bakersfield, California directly east of the downtown. The region was formerly known as the town of Sumner, which was later incorporated and renamed Kern City. It is primarily a mixture of residential and commercial developments. It also contains a small business district (which was the downtown for Kern City) centered on the intersection of Baker and Sumner streets. Census data is provided on the right for the time period when the region was an independent town and city. It is part of the Bakersfield urban area of almost 500,000 people.

The major school districts in East Bakersfield are the Bakersfield City School District and the Kern Union High School District. East Bakersfield has four high schools, Highland High School, East Bakersfield High School, Foothill High School, and Mira Monte High School.

== History ==
Historical population
Census	Pop.	Note	%±
1880	242		—
1890	622		157.0%
1900	1,291		107.6%
1950	38,177		—
US Census

In 1874, the Southern Pacific railroad was extended to the southern San Joaquin Valley. Bakersfield was positioned to be a whistle-stop, but a land dispute developed between the city and the railroad. Southern Pacific wanted two blocks of land from the city; Bakersfield was only willing to give one block. The result of the dispute was Southern Pacific building its tracks five miles east of Bakersfield and founding their own town. This town was called Sumner in honor of Joseph W. Sumner, mine owner and judge. It would eventually become East Bakersfield.

A post office opened in Sumner in 1876. Since the train went through Sumner, instead of Bakersfield, it was a serious competitor to the city. However, the citizens of Bakersfield rallied, and maintained a presence in their city. By 1888, a street car line was built between Bakersfield and Sumner. The route was down 19th St., and was the only road that connected the two settlements.

By 1892, Sumner, which was now known as Kern City, would incorporate into a city. The city of Bakersfield had disincorporated (or dissolved as a city) in 1876, but voted to reincorporate in 1898, and became a city again. That same year, Bakersfield finally became its own whistle-stop with the building of the San Francisco and San Joaquin Railroad, which was later bought by Santa Fe.

With the construction of the new railroad, the need for Kern City diminished. In 1910, Kern City voted to join Bakersfield. It also became known as East Bakersfield. This was Bakersfield's first major expansion outside its historic central area. Many of the city's transit locations were in East Bakersfield. These included a second fire station, another library (Baker Street Branch), and a new high school (East Bakersfield High School).

In the 1950 U.S. census, an unincorporated community under the name East Bakersfield was listed with a population of 38,177; and then did not appear in the 1960 U.S. census.

== Old Town Kern ==
Old Town Kern is located primarily around Baker Street, and was the former central business district for the town of Sumner (which was later renamed Kern City). This was the location of the original train station in Bakersfield and competed to be the commercial downtown, eventually losing to the present location west of Old Town. This district is home to many Basque-cuisine restaurants.

== See also ==
- Bakersfield, California
- Bakersfield (Southern Pacific station)
