= Mill Creek, Bakersfield =

Mill Creek
- District of Bakersfield
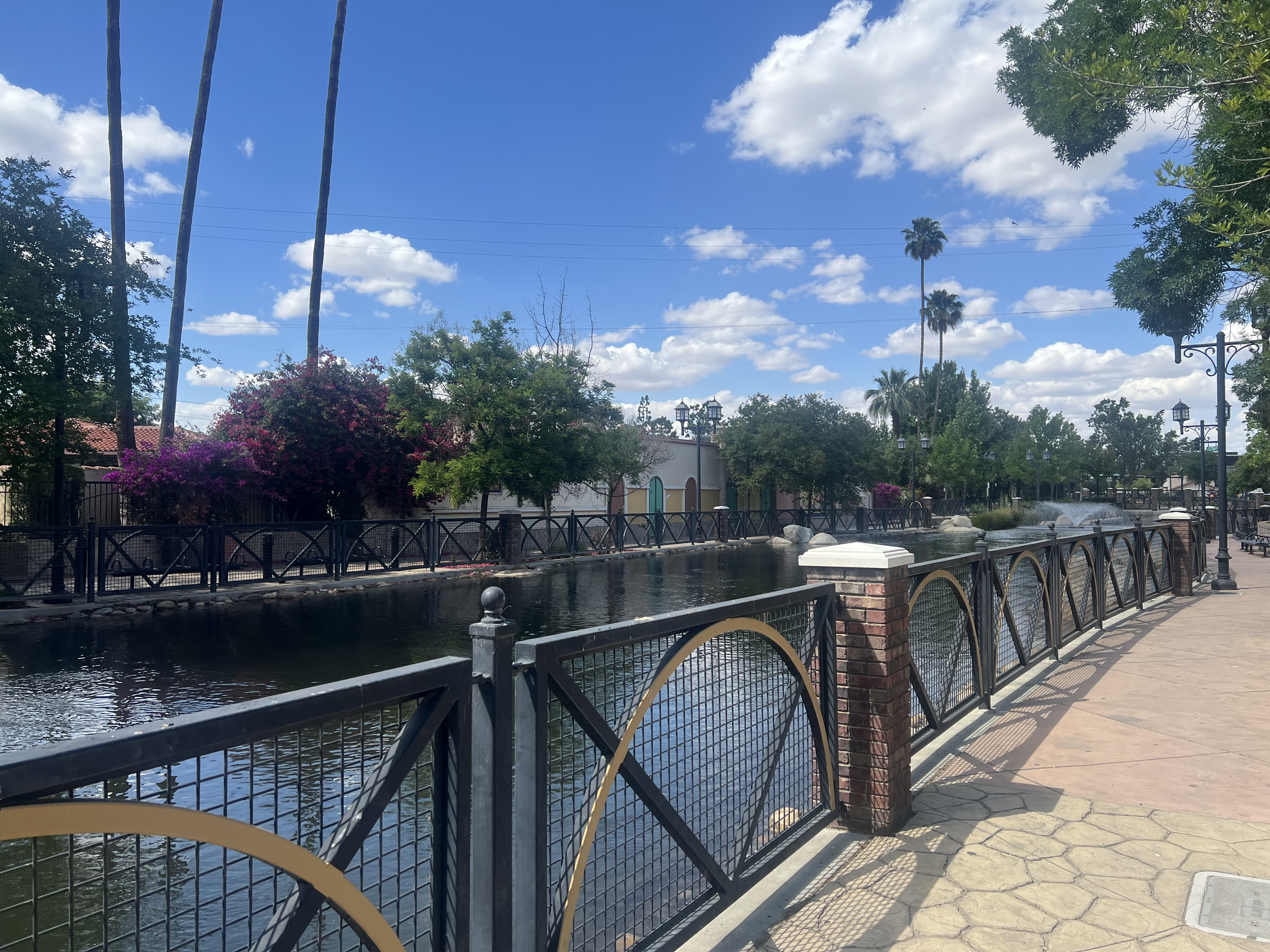
- Path along the canal in Mill Creek Park.

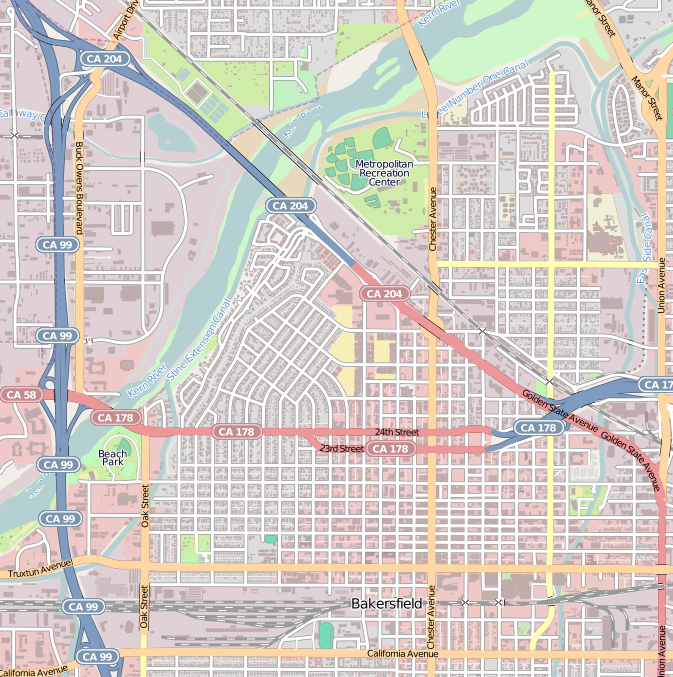
- Location within Downtown Bakersfield Mill Creek (California)
- Coordinates: 35°22′34″N 119°0′29″W
- Country: United States
- State: California
- County: Kern County
- City: Bakersfield

Mill Creek is a district in Downtown Bakersfield, California. It is primarily a mixture of residential and commercial on the east side of downtown. Since the mid-2000s, the district has gone through major redevelopment. These included, the development of the Kern Island Canal into a walking path (also called Mill Creek), the redevelopment of Central Park, construction of the Federal Courthouse, and construction of several new housing and commercial developments.

Prior to the 2000s, this district did not exist, and was generally referred to simply as "part of downtown." When the project was being developed, it was discovered that a mill used to be located on the Kern Island Canal in the new district. It was decided to name the new district "Mill Creek" after the mill.

== Points of interest ==
- Bakersfield Museum of Art
- Beale Memorial Library
- Central Park or Mill Creek
- Federal Courthouse

== Transportation ==
The Bakersfield Amtrak Station is located in the district. It serves Amtrak Inter-city trans traveling north and Amtrak Thruway traveling west, south, and east. It is also used by Kern Regional Transit as one of its Bakersfield hubs for inter-regional service. Golden Empire Transit has two routes stop near the station.
