= Education District, Bakersfield =

Education District
- District of Bakersfield
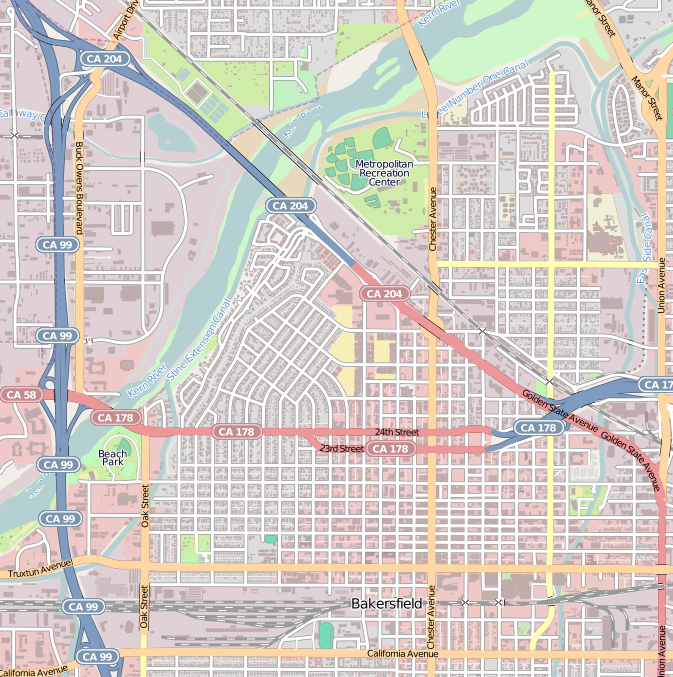
- Location within Downtown Bakersfield Education District (California)
- Coordinates: 35°22′41″N 119°0′59″W
- Country: United States
- State: California
- County: Kern County
- City: Bakersfield

Education District is a district in Downtown Bakersfield, California. Its predominant businesses are satellite campuses for both public and private colleges and universities. Unlike several other districts in downtown, the Education District did not come about because of formal planning but because like businesses decided to locate themselves together.

== History ==
In the 1970s, Bakersfield College established a satellite campus in a former department store. Although not known as the Education District at the time, it was the first college to establish a presence downtown. In 1997, the Bakersfield City School District established the Downtown Elementary School nearby. When University Square, which served as a satellite campus for UC Merced and Santa Barbara Business College, was constructed in 2001, the education district had been formally established.

== Educational institutions ==
The following educational institutions are located in the district:

- Bakersfield College (satellite campus)
- Downtown Elementary School
- Santa Barbara Business College
- University of La Verne
- University of California, Merced (satellite campus)
