= Downtown Bakersfield =

Neighborhood in Bakersfield, California

- Central business district District of Bakersfield
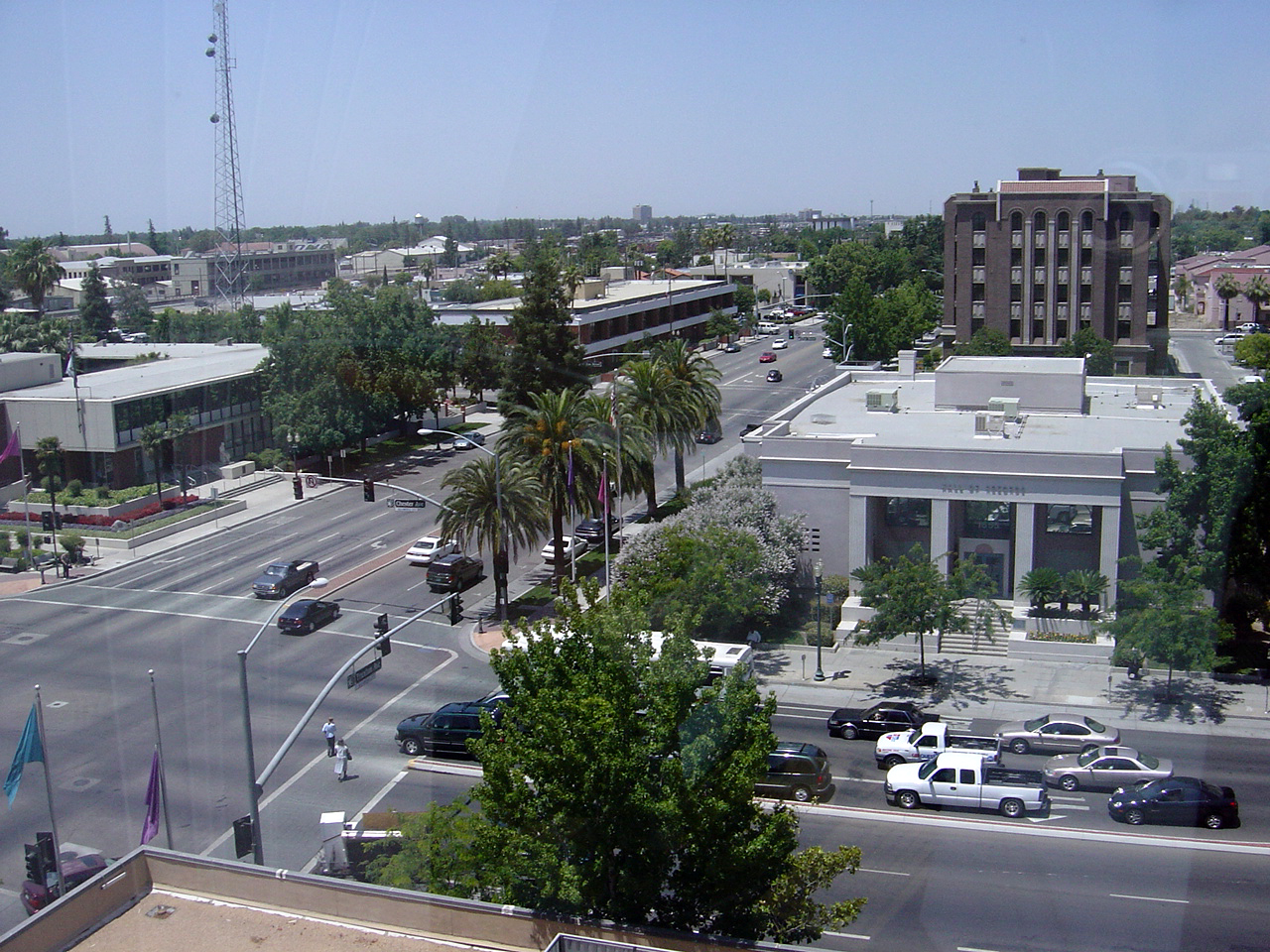
- Downtown's civic center viewed from Truxtun Tower (also known as Bank of America Building)

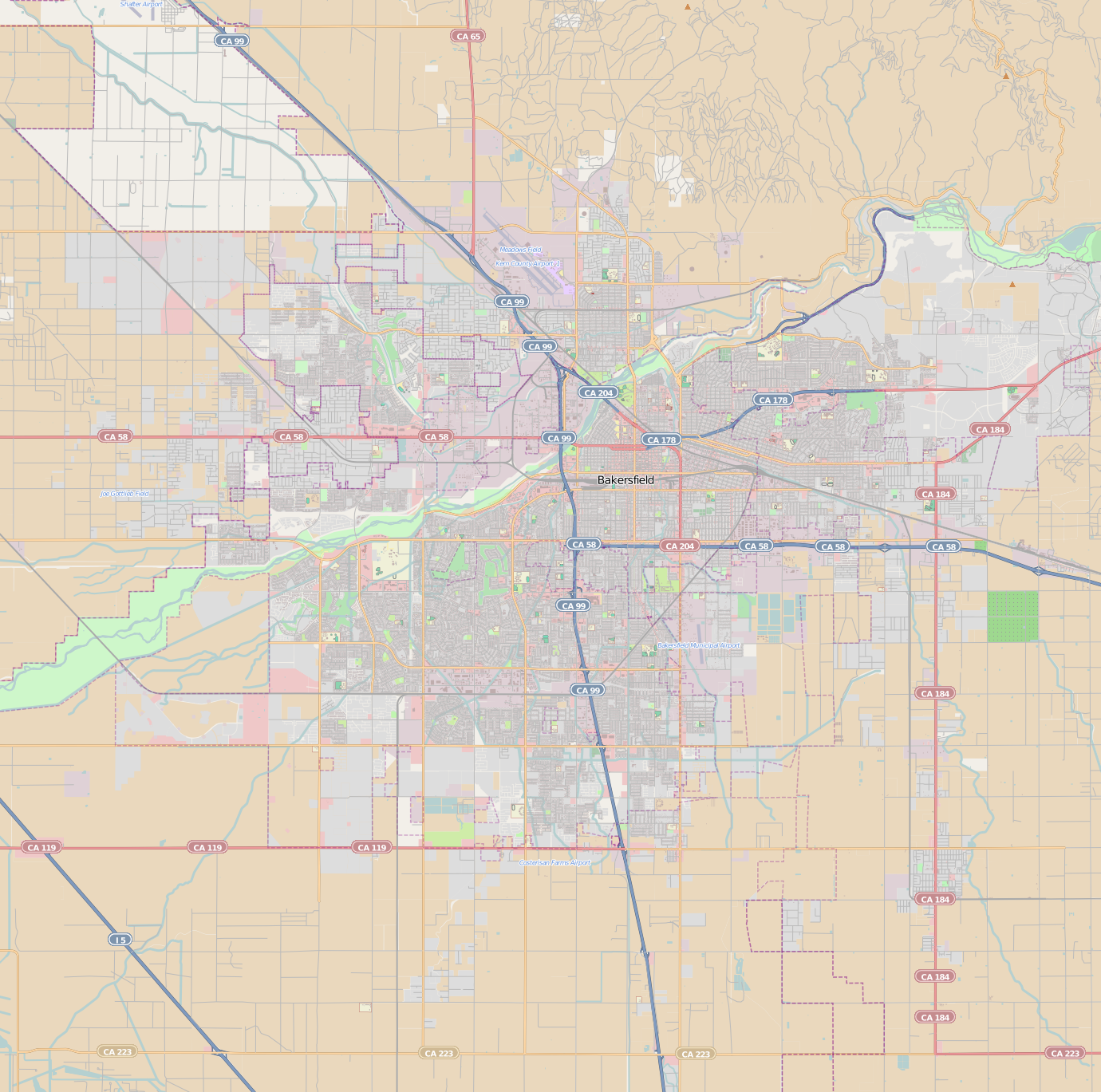
- Location within Bakersfield
- Coordinates: 35°22′41″N 119°1′8″W
- Country: United States
- State: California
- County: Kern
- City: Bakersfield
- Subdistricts of Downtown: List: Arts District; Civic Center; Education District; Mill Creek

Area
  - Total: 1.737 sq mi (4.50 km^{2})
- Using the smaller, more commonly associated boundaries for downtown.
- ZIP Code: 93301
- Area Code: 661

Downtown is the central business district for Bakersfield, California. It contains several of the city's major theaters, sports complex, museums, and historical landmarks.

What is considered to be "downtown" Bakersfield varies. Starting from the north and traveling clockwise, Central Bakersfield is bound by the Kern River, Union Avenue, State Route 58, and State Route 99. The Downtown Business Association defines downtown Bakersfield as the region bordered by 24th Street (SR 178), Union Avenue (SR 204), California Avenue, and F Street. Other people extend the boundaries west to State Route 99 and north to Golden State Avenue (SR 204).

There are a few tall buildings in Downtown Bakersfield, such as the Bank of America Building (10 stories), the Bakersfield Marriott Hotel (9 stories), and The Padre Hotel (8 stories). The shops and cafes that line the Downtown streets feature dining and shopping venues. Notable attractions in Downtown Bakersfield include the Rabobank Arena, the McMurtrey Aquatic Center, the Bakersfield Museum of Art, the historic Fox Theater, the Padre Hotel, and a nightlife district centered on 19th Street and Wall Street Alley.

== Districts ==
=== Arts District ===
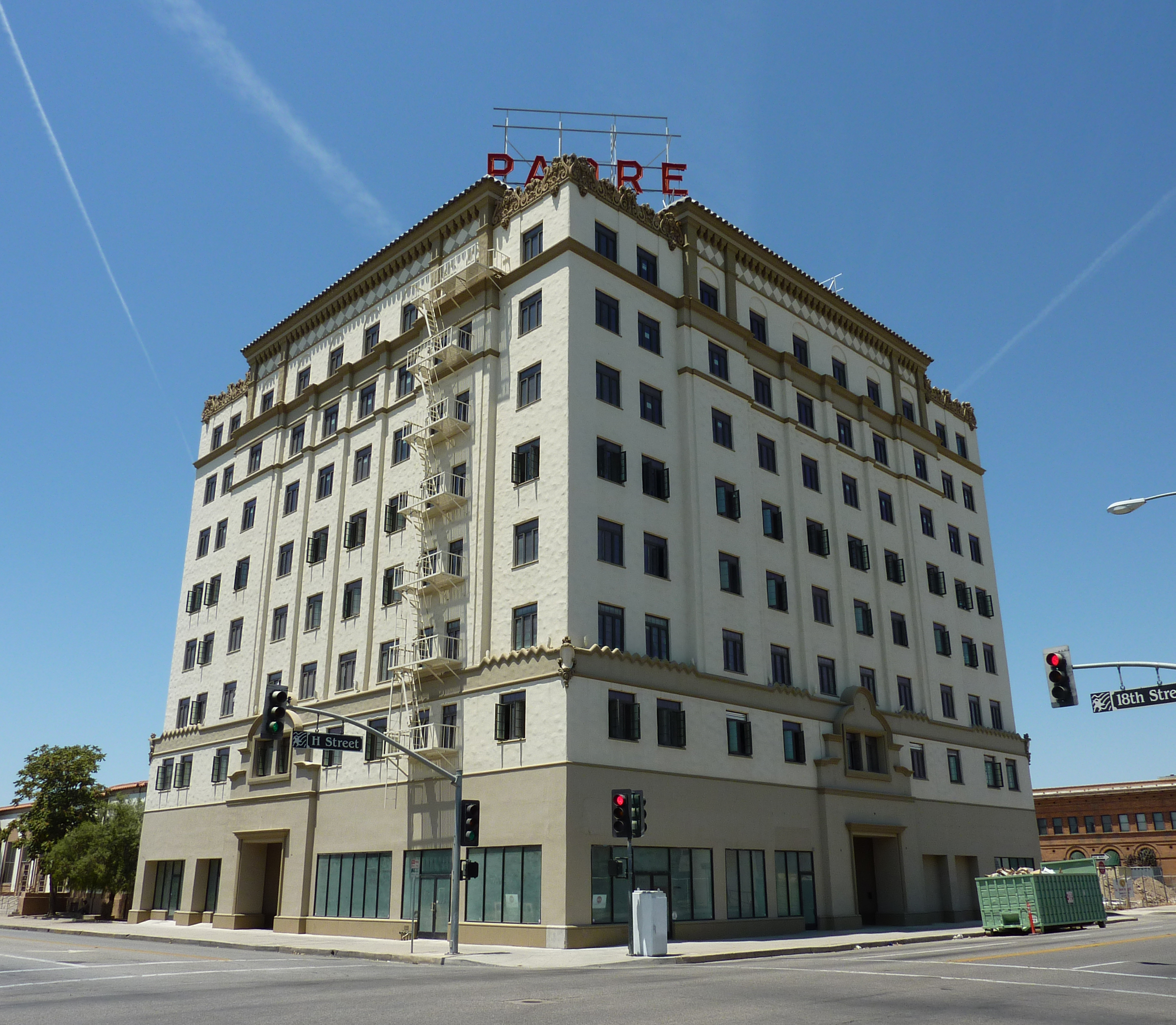
The Padre Hotel building, renovated and reopened in 2010, has been a longtime landmark in Downtown Bakersfield.

The Arts District is roughly bordered by 21st Street, Chester Avenue, 17th Street, and G Street. Theaters in the district include the Fox Theater (20th and H streets), Stars Theater (Chester Avenue and 20th Street), and Spotlight Theater (19th and H streets). In addition, several art galleries are located around the intersection of 19th Street and Eye Street. The Arts District has the historic Padre Hotel, which has been remodeled and reopened as a boutique hotel.

=== Civic Center ===
Civic Center is the center of government for both the City of Bakersfield and the County of Kern. It is roughly bordered by Truxtun Avenue, Q Street, the BNSF railroad yard, and H Street. Major government buildings include Bakersfield City Hall, County of Kern Administrative Building, Kern County Hall of Records, Superior Court, and Municipal Court.

Although structures representing the center of government, such as City Hall and the Court House, are located there, many services are being moved to other places throughout the city. Many state and federal services are also placed in locations outside of the Civic Center. Civic Center houses the Dignity Health Theater and Convention Center (formerly known as the Civic Auditorium). This is the largest theater and convention facility in the city. It is located next to the Marriott Convention Hotel.

The Dignity Health Arena (formerly known as the Centennial Garden, Rabobank Arena, and Mechanics Bank Arena) is a large indoor multipurpose arena. The McMurtrey Aquatic Center houses a 50-meter competition swimming and diving pool. There is also the Bakersfield Ice Sports Center, an indoor ice rink used for junior and adult league hockey and recreation.

=== Education District ===
Education District is the center of education institutions that are located Downtown. Currently five institutions have a campus or a satellite campus in the district. The Education District is roughly bordered by 24th Street, Q Street, 20th Street, and Chester Avenue.

=== Mill Creek ===
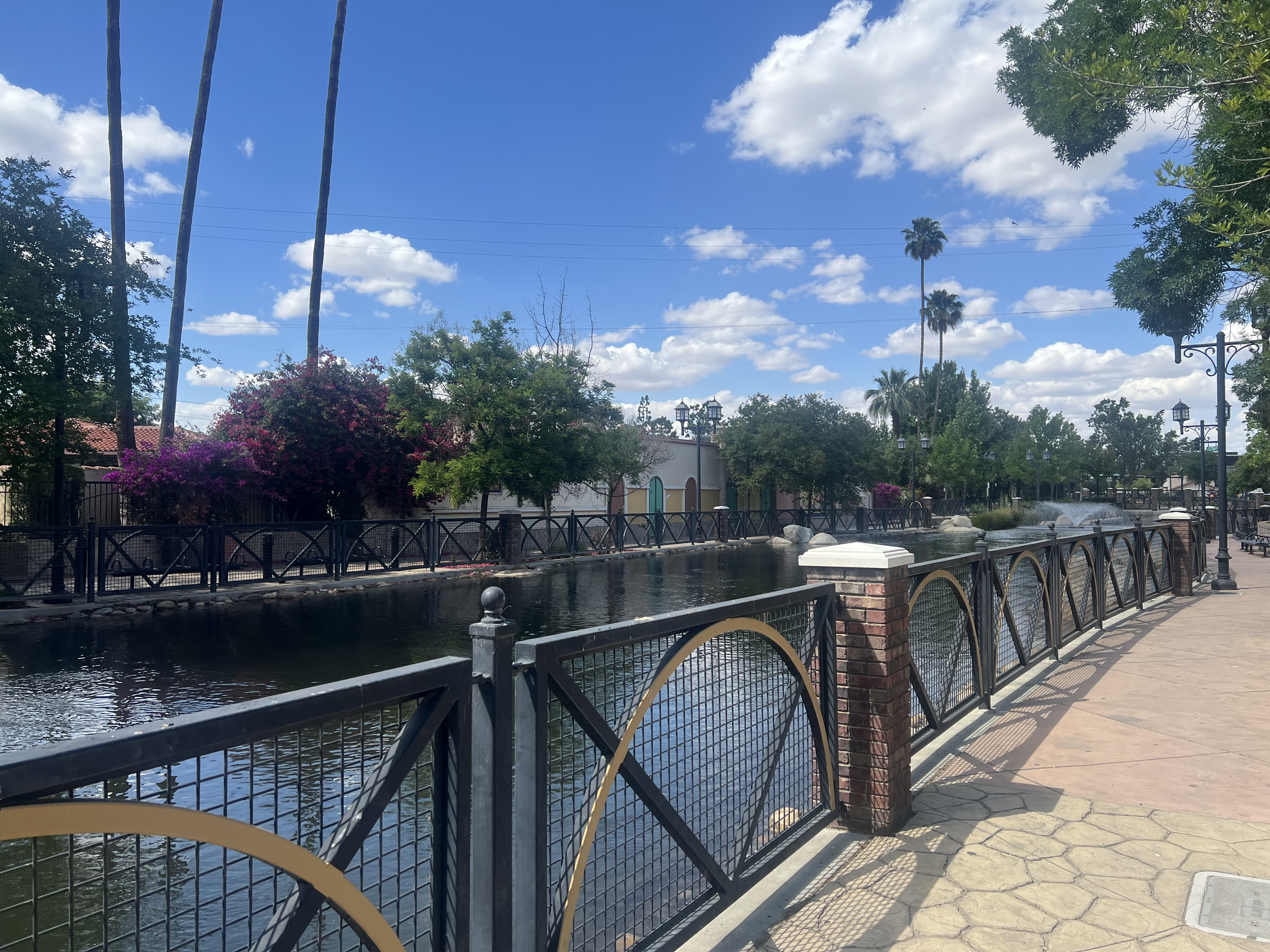
Walking path along the canal in the Mill Creek Park.

Mill Creek is another one of Downtown's districts and is still being developed. When fully completed, Mill Creek can consist of a mixture of both commercial and retail. The redevelopment area is defined to be Golden State Avenue, Union Avenue, California Avenue, and Q Street. Running through the center of Mill Creek is the Mill Creek Linear Park. This runs along the man-made Kern Island Canal, which has been redesigned to have the look of a natural river.

A major attraction in the area is the Bakersfield Museum of Art. The Beale Memorial Library, which is the headquarters for the Kern County Library System, is also located in Mill Creek. Another structure is the Amtrak station, which is Bakersfield's rail link to the San Joaquin Valley.

== Other neighborhoods and districts ==
The following are neighborhoods and districts which are near Downtown Bakersfield. Some people consider them to be a part of Downtown.

=== Buck Owens Boulevard ===
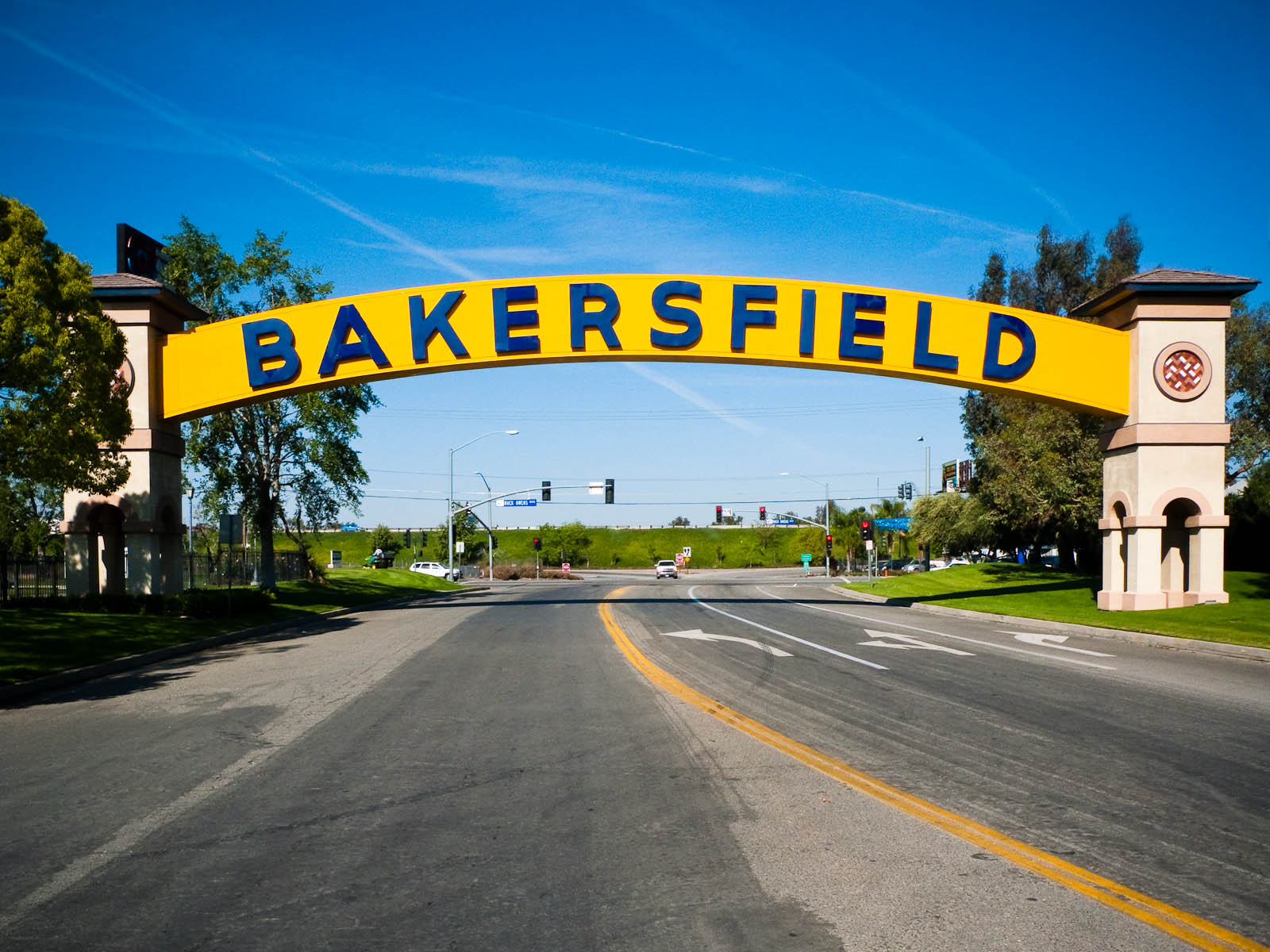
The Bakersfield Sign

Formerly named Pierce Road, Buck Owens Boulevard was renamed in 1998 in honor of long-time Bakersfield resident and country music legend Buck Owens, who died in 2006. Buck Owens Boulevard runs north/south, parallel to Highway 99, between Rosedale Highway/24th Street in Bakersfield, and Airport Drive in Oildale. Buck Owens Boulevard is located near Beach Park and is the heart of Bakersfield's Country Music scene.

The main attractions in the area are the original Bakersfield Sign (formerly located at the intersection of California and Union Avenues) and the Buck Owens Crystal Palace.

=== Westchester ===
The Westchester neighborhood is just west of Downtown Bakersfield, although some people consider it to be part of Downtown. Westchester is bounded by the Kern River, F Street, the BNSF Railroad Yard and State Route 99 (or Oak Street). Main points of interest include the Kern County Museum (with the Beale Memorial Clock Tower), and Sam Lynn Ballpark.

=== Oleander-Sunset ===
The Oleander-Sunset neighborhood is located in central Bakersfield and sits on the southern end of downtown Bakersfield. The Oleander-Sunset Area consists of two neighborhoods: the Lowell Community and the Oleander Community. Oleander-Sunset is bounded by California Avenue, Union Avenue, Highway 58, and Highway 99. It contains Lowell Park, Beale Park, Mount Zion Baptist Church, Lowell Place Senior Community, Bakersfield High School, Vista P. Continuation High School, Rafer Johnson Community School, Emerson Junior High School, Roosevelt Elementary, McKinley Elementary, William Penn Elementary, the Lowell Neighborhood Community Center, the Ebony Counseling Center, and the Kern County Black Chamber of Commerce.

The Oleander-Sunset suburbs may refer to the Oleander area only. The Oleander neighborhood is traditionally bounded by California Avenue on the north, H Street on the east, State Route 58 on the south, and Oak Street on the west. Meanwhile, the Lowell Community is bounded by California Avenue, Union Avenue, State Route 58, and H Street.

=== Chinatown ===
Bakersfield's historic Chinatown was a nine square-block district bordered roughly by 20th and 23rd streets and N and K streets.

== Transportation ==
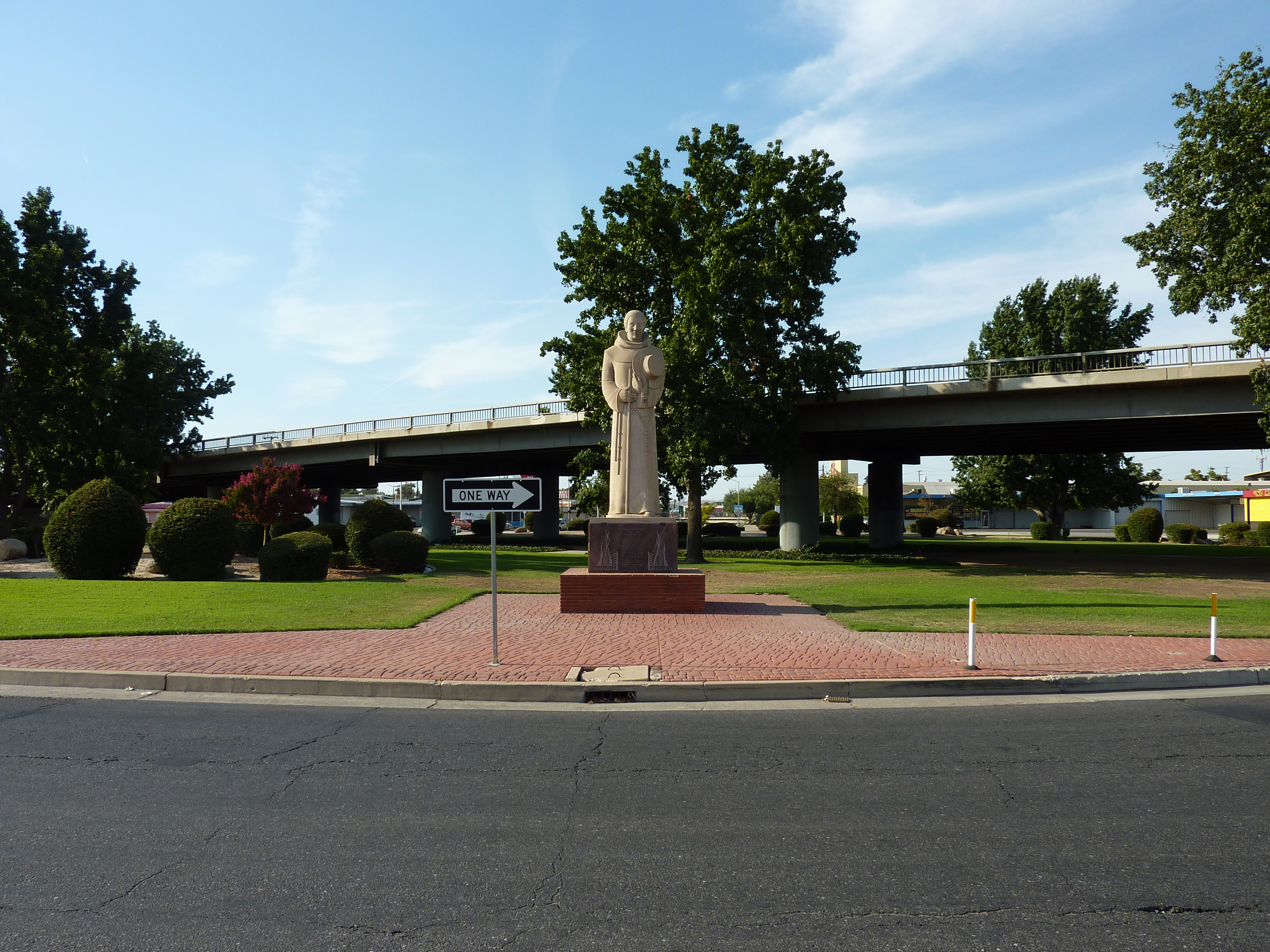
Garces Circle

State Route 178 ends at the eastern edge of downtown and provides a connection to the northeast. State Route 99 runs approximately a half-mile west of downtown and provides a north-south connection to the rest of the city. Golden State Ave (State Route 204), as a freeway ends at the north edge of downtown and provides access to the northwest.

Golden Empire Transit (GET) provides transportation to Greater Bakersfield from the downtown transit center. Kern Regional Transit provides intercity transportation from the GET downtown transit center or Amtrak station. Amtrak provides rail connections to the San Joaquin Valley north of Bakersfield and several bus routes to points west, south, and east of the city. SR 178 and Golden State Avenue (SR 204) stop at the edge of Downtown.

== See also ==
- Bakersfield, California
