= Mike Stilkey =

American artist (born 1975)

- Born: Michael James Stilkey Jr. October 15, 1975 (age 51); Tarzana, California, U.S.
- Known for: Artist
- Notable work: Discarded Romance (2012); Lady of Arlington (2013)

Michael James Stilkey Jr. (born October 15, 1975) is an American artist known for his book sculpture paintings.

== Early life ==
Mike Stilkey was born in Tarzana, California, and spent his childhood moving from city to city primarily in the Los Angeles area. From age 8 to 14, Stilkey attended a different school each year. Most of his childhood was spent in Malibu Lake, a small town Stilkey describes as a "hippy party community". The son of addict parents, Stilkey found himself at a very early age immersed in a world of drug culture, parties and a life without discipline. "I was allowed to do anything I wanted. There were no rules."

In his teenage years, Stilkey picked up skateboarding. He described skateboarding as a retreat away from his dysfunctional family. Stilkey claims his artwork was partly inspired by the spirit of skateboarding which taught him how to take a different perspective on life and living. "When people are looking ahead, I'm looking at the details of the curb…looking at different things." Stilkey's dream of becoming a professional skateboarder was crushed at age 20 after a series of injuries.

With his injury sidelining him from skateboarding, Stilkey turned to drawing and painting. "My family never talked about feelings. I was not allowed to express myself as a kid. Skateboarding was where I let out my emotions, but since I couldn't skate anymore, I picked up a pencil and expressed what was inside…the good, the bad and the unknown. This was the only way I could let it out." Stilkey has described going into a fantasy world while creating art: "I was doing drugs, I had addicts for parents and a messed up family. Art saved my life".

== Career ==
Stilkey's first encounter with art came at age 18 with mutual friends that were a part of the AWR and MSK Graffiti crews in Los Angeles. He did not produce graffiti but was influenced by the culture and enjoyed the rebellious spirit of their work.

After painting for a few years, working odd jobs, and dealing with a recent suicide attempt by his father, the 24-year-old Stilkey fell into a major depression and had what he called a "mental breakdown". He donated his car, quit his job and promised himself never to work for anyone ever again. "Why would I struggle doing something I hated. I'd rather struggle doing something I love." Within a week, Stilkey met Markus Brandley, the owner of Artpiece gallery in Los Angeles. Brandley was inspired by Stilkey's free spirit and invited him to use Artpiece as a studio space. One of Stilkey's first solo shows at Artpiece was entitled 100 Portraits. Stilkey painted 100 portraits on book pages. 100 Portraits, a limited edition book of the portraits was published.

In 2006 gallery owners Jana DesForges and artist Dave Kinsey (original partner with Shepard Fairey) discovered Stilkey's work. Later that year BLK/MRKT invited Stilkey to be a part of a group show. Stilkey debuted his first book sculpture while exhibiting work at BLK/MRKT.

It was sort of an accident. I was painting on book pages for forever. At the time, I was drawing on books, records or anything else I could find at a thrift store. Eventually, I started drawing on the books themselves. I was going to do a project where I just drew on the covers of the books, and as I finished them I would stack them against the wall. It dawned on me that it might be a good idea to paint down the spines of the books instead of just on the covers. The first one I did I didn't really think much of, but I brought it down to BLK/MRKT, and I remember Jana going crazy over it. We showed it at the second Artists' Annual group show where it got quite a bit of attention, including attention from Kim Davenport, the director of Rice Gallery in Houston.

The day after the show, Rice University contacted Stilkey about a large-scale installation. Within the week Stilkey was in Houston and in discussions about creating a piece that would consist of 5,000 books. The exhibition opened in the summer of 2007. Rice University bought the piece, where it is now on permanent display.

Since 2007, Stilkey's work has been exhibited throughout the United States as well as internationally, at galleries and museums such as: the Bristol City Museum in the UK, Mesa Contemporary Art Museum in Mesa, Arizona, Bakersfield Museum of Art in Bakersfield, California, the Arne Nixon Center at California State University, Fresno, the Andrea Schwartz Gallery in San Francisco, the Kinsey/DesForges Gallery in Culver City, California, the David B. Smith Gallery in Denver, the Gilman Contemporary Gallery, Ketchum, Idaho, and LeBasse Projects in Culver City, California. He has also created numerous large-scale installations internationally in: Bordeaux, France; Hong Kong, China; Turin, Italy; Manila, Philippines; and Bern, Switzerland.

Stilkey's largest installation entitled Discarded Romance debuted in Hong Kong Times Square in 2012. The 24 foot high by 14 foot wide installation consisting of more than 5,000 books was the centerpiece of a solo show in Hong Kong entitled Full of Smiles and Soft Attentions. This show propelled Stilkey's international profile. Andrew Hosner of Arrested Motion wrote: "Stilkey's work features a melancholic and at times whimsical cast of characters, with an aesthetic reminiscent of Weimer-era German expressionism. Inhabiting an ambiguous environment, his subjects convey a lingering sense of loss and longing. Stilkey's work reinvents the canvas to push boundaries between words, visual art and music".

Jenna Krajeski of The New Yorker wrote: "His work on stacked spines and covers reworks books into a beautiful, albeit unreadable, library".

For the 50th Anniversary of John F. Kennedy's death, the Washington Post commissioned Stilkey to paint a portrait of Kennedy on books that were written about Kennedy. A photo of the portrait garnered the front page of the Washington Post on October 27, 2013.

== Personal life ==
Stilkey is an avid pool player and can be commonly found in pool tournaments where other contestants only know him by his nickname "Red."

Stilkey is an animal lover and vegetarian. "I love the fact that animals have such strong personalities. In the end we're all the same. We're all alive in this weird place".

Stilkey lives in a suburb of Los Angeles with his wife and son. His wife Elizabeth has been the inspiration for many of Mike's works.

== Solo exhibitions ==
- 2014 The Frostig Collection, Santa Monica, California. Kids Collection
- 2014 Gilman Contemporary Gallery, Ketchum, Idaho. While the Time is Slow
- 2013 Fully Booked, Manila, Philippines. Discarded Romance
- 2012 Times Square, Hong Kong, China. Full of Smiles and Soft Attentions
- 2011 Gilman Contemporary Gallery, Ketchum, Idaho. Certainly Not Without Serenade
- 2010 Hurley's H Space Gallery, Costa Mesa, California. Reminiscent
- 2009 David B. Smith Gallery, Denver, Colorado. Words Fail Me
- 2008 Kinsey/DesForges Gallery, Culver City, California. Slightly All the Time
- 2008 Milieu Galerie/Artspace, Bern, Switzerland. An Occasion of Wonder
- 2007 BLK/MRKT Gallery, Culver City, California. Horse Stories
- 2006 Curio 69 Gallery, Los Angeles. Recent Works
- 2005 Artpiece Gallery, Los Angeles. One Hundred Portraits

== Installations ==
- 2014 Arts of Palm, Beverly Hills, California, Beverly Hills Library, "Party Animals"
- 2014 Big D Magazine, Dallas, South Side Lamar Building, "Outsiders"
- 2014 The Arne Nixon Center for the Study of Children's Literature, Fresno, California. "Turning Pages"
- 2013 The Washington Post, Washington, D.C., "50 Year JFK Anniversary"
- 2013 Fully Booked, Manila, Philippines. "Discarded Romance"
- 2012 Bakersfield Museum of Art, Bakersfield, California. "A Day to Remember"
- 2012 JOYCE Boutique, Hong Kong, China. Site specific installation.
- 2011 Porta Nuova Railway Station, Turin, Italy, for the International Book Fair, "An Affair with the City"
- 2010 Bristol City Museum and Art Gallery. Bristol, UK, "An Unusual Evening"
- 2010 Hurley's H Space Gallery, Costa Mesa, California. "The Piano Has Been Drinking"
- 2010 Added to the permanent collections of Laguna Beach High School, Laguna Beach, California, and Nike/Hurley, Costa Mesa, California
- 2007 Rice University Gallery, Houston, Texas. "When the Animals Rebel"
- 2007 Added to the permanent collection of the Fondren Library at Rice University

== Select group exhibitions ==
- 2014 Saint Rémi, Bordeaux, FR. BDX-LAX
- 2014 Mesa Contemporary Arts Museum, Mesa, Arizona. Boundless
- 2013 Andrea Schwartz Gallery, San Francisco. Between the Lines (Three-person show with Cara Barer and Melinda Tidwell)
- 2012 Bakersfield Museum of Art, Bakersfield, California. Out of Print
- 2012 Breeze Block Gallery, Portland, Oregon. Space//Form
- 2011 Cannon Art Gallery, Carlsbad, California. Face to Face: The Changing Face of Portraiture
- 2011 Corey Helford Gallery, Culver City, California. In the Nursery
- 2011 Washington Project for the Arts, Washington, D.C. Art Auction Gala.
- 2011 Andi Campognone Projects, Pomona, California. Art for Awareness (Art auction and benefit for the Oceanic Awareness Collaboration)
- 2010 Bristol City Museum and Art Gallery, Bristol, UK. Art from the New World
- 2010 Grand Central Art Center, Cal State University Fullerton, Santa Ana, California. 100 Artists See Satan
- 2010 Stolenspace Gallery, London, UK. Never Judge
- 2010 Guenzel Gallery, Peninsula School of Art, Door County, Wisconsin. The Book as Sculpture
- 2010 David B. Smith Gallery, Denver, Colorado. Group Exhibition: Part One
- 2010 Gilman Contemporary Gallery, Ketchum, Idaho.; Art Chicago, Chicago, Illinois
- 2010 LeBasse Projects, Culver City, California.; San Diego Contemporary Art Fair, San Diego, California
- 2009 Gilman Contemporary Gallery, Ketchum, Idaho. A Happy Medium
- 2009 Galerie Europ'Art, Aigues-Mortes, France. Le Livre Est Une Oeuvre d'Art
- 2009 Metro Pictures, New York. Postcards From the Edge
- 2008 Gilman Contemporary Gallery, Ketchum, Idaho. Megan Murphy, Mike Stilkey and Alicia Tormey
- 2008 Gilman Contemporary Gallery, Ketchum, Idaho. See & Be Seen
- 2008 Second City Art Council Art Gallery, Long Beach, California. Visual Literacy (Juried exhibition; awarded first place.)
- 2007 BLK/MRKT Gallery, Los Angeles, BMG Artists' Annual
- 2007 BLK/MRKT Gallery at Red Dot Fair, Miami, Florida, Art Basel
- 2007 Gilman Contemporary Gallery, Ketchum, Idaho, Robert Atwell, Amy Bird and Mike Stilkey
- 2007 Gilman Contemporary Gallery, Ketchum, Idaho, Works on Paper
- 2007 Orange County Center for Contemporary Art, Santa Ana, California, Untitled LOVE Project, phase 1
- 2006 BLK/MRKT Gallery, Los Angeles, BMG Artists' Annual
- 2006 Mauve Gallery, Orange County, California, The White Elephant Show (Children's Hospital of Orange County Charity Exhibition)
- 2005 Harmony Gallery, Los Angeles, Critters and Ghosts
- 2005 Voice 1156 Gallery, San Diego, No Stress
- 2005 L.A. Artfest, Los Angeles, Group Show
- 2005 Create/Fixate, Los Angeles, Group Show
- 2004 Bolsky Gallery, Otis College of Art and Design, Los Angeles, California, Group Show
- 2004 Artpiece Gallery, Los Angeles, Innocence
