= Kern City =

Kern City may refer to:

- East Bakersfield, California, formerly known as Kern City
- Kern City, Bakersfield, California, a former unincorporated community
