= List of neighborhoods in Bakersfield =

Bakersfield, California has a wide variety of districts and neighborhoods. Generally, its citizens refer to the city by regions, named after directions (for example, the northeast, the northwest, and the southwest). These regions are further broken down into individual neighborhoods and districts (for example, Stockdale and Seven Oaks are part of the Southwest).

The origins of neighborhood names vary greatly. Some are named after a nearby facility, such as Stockdale which is named after the Stockdale Country Club. Some are named after previous communities which have been incorporated into Bakersfield. For example, Old Town Kern is named after the former Kern City. However, most come from developers, either named directly (such as Riverlakes Ranch), or after a large named development (such as Seven Oaks).

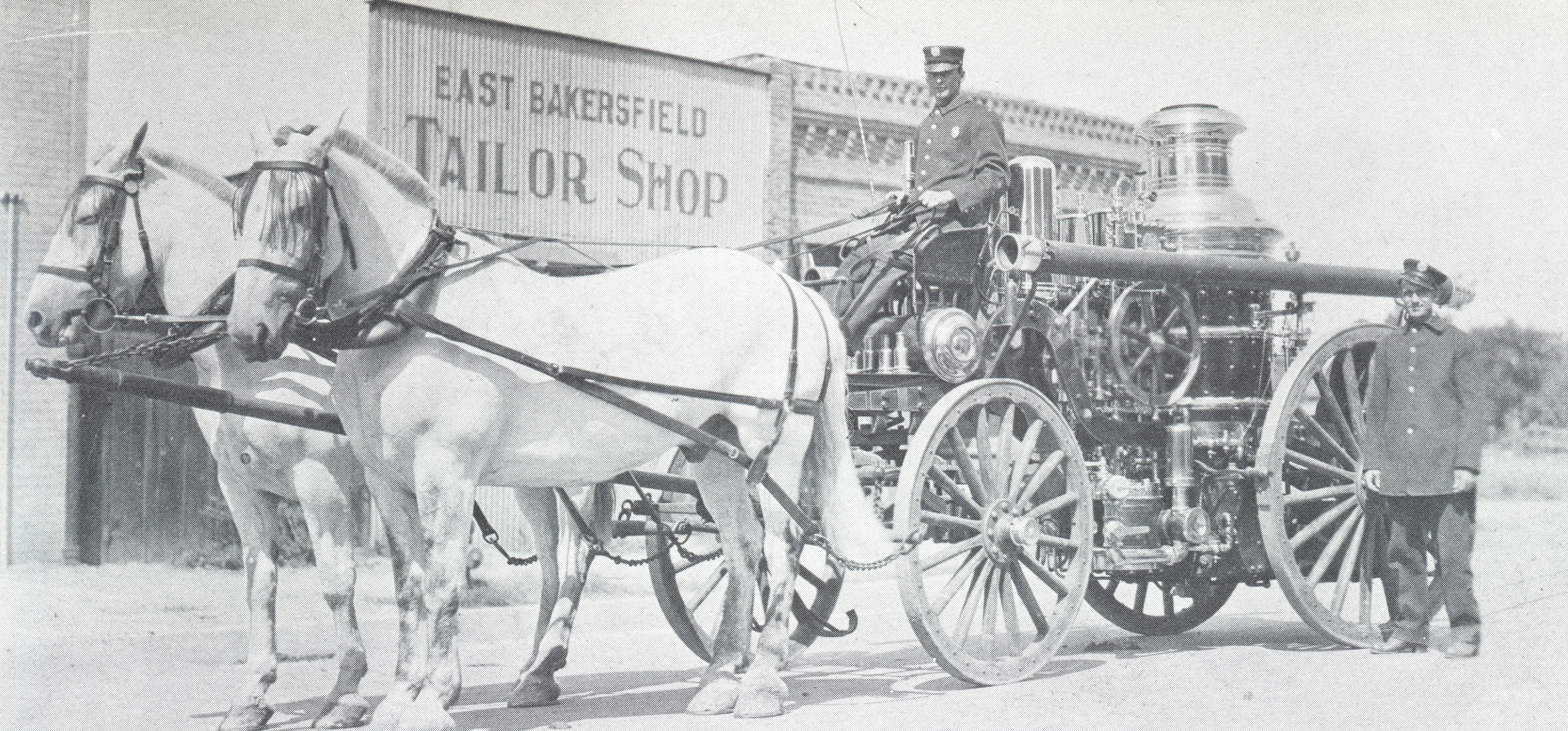
Bakersfield has historically referred to its various regions by directional names. Such as this tailor shop (circa 1912).

== Central Bakersfield (Downtown) ==
Central Bakersfield refers to the area in the center of Bakersfield. Starting north and traveling clockwise, it is bounded by Golden State Avenue, Union Avenue, State Route 58, and State Route 99. Central Bakersfield includes the civic center, the Arts District, the Lowell Community, and the Oleander Community. It contains the oldest portions of the city; Downtown, Bakersfield's central business district is located there. It also houses Chester Market, Lowell Place Senior Center, the Kern County Museum, and the Kern County Chamber of Commerce. Downtown is considered by many as the area bounded by 24th Street, Union Ave, California Ave, and F Street.

== North Bakersfield ==
North Bakersfield refers to the area north of Bakersfield, between California State Route 99 and the Kern River. Currently, it is the only region in which no part is incorporated into Bakersfield. The town of Oildale is located there. It also contains Bakersfield's commercial airport, Meadows Field. Because of the region's close proximity to the freeway network (State Route 99), railroad mainline (Union Pacific), and air travel (Meadows Field), it is rapidly becoming the center of Bakersfield's distribution industry.

== Northeast ==
Northeast Bakersfield (commonly referred to simply as The Northeast) refers to the area northeast of Bakersfield. Because of East Bakersfield's (see below) boundaries, the Northeast wraps around the region. As a result, there is not as much of a consensus as to its boundaries, compared to other regions. However, the common boundaries, starting at the southwest and traveling clockwise are: Mt. Vernon Avenue, Alfred Harrell Highway, State Route 178, State Route 184 (Kern Canyon Road), and Edison Highway.

Although development started in the 1950s, much of the region is rural. This is also the only region to be located on rolling hills. Bakersfield College, built in 1956, is located here. Some of the oldest development in this area is located along Panorama Drive and Niles Street. Panorama Drive runs along the bluffs and overlooks the Kern River Oil Field. Alfred Harrell Highway serves the Kern River County Park, a 1,014-acre (4.10 km^{2}) recreation area which contains: Hart Memorial Park, California Living Museum (CALM), Lake Ming, and the Kern River Golf Course. The Northeast also contains the Rio Bravo Country Club and the Bakersfield Country Club.

== East Bakersfield ==
East Bakersfield refers to Kern City (originally known as the town of Sumner), which was later annexed by Bakersfield. Starting at the northwest and traveling clockwise, the region is bounded by Bernard Street, Mount Vernon Avenue, East California Avenue, and Union Avenue. Because the town was created by Southern Pacific, the streets are laid out parallel to their railroad tracks, which are about 45 degrees off from the rest of the city. This makes East Bakersfield one of the easiest regions to identify on a map. Additionally, because it was a city prior to annexation, East Bakersfield has its own central business district (known as Old Town Kern) centered around the intersection of Baker Street and Sumner Avenue.

== Southeast ==
Southeast Bakersfield (commonly referred to simply as The Southeast) refers to the area in southeast Bakersfield, between Union Avenue, East California Avenue, and Edison Highway. The Southeast includes the M.L.K. Community, Jastro Avenue & Mcnew Court, and the Cottonwood Community, which consists of Reece & Cheatum, Casa Loma Drive, Madison & Adams, Watt's & Lotus, and the East Planz Road & Madison area. The Southeast also contains three parks: Casa Loma Park, Bell Terrace Park, and Rexland Park. It also includes Casa Loma Elementary, the Career Services Center, and the town of Delkern (most commonly referred to as the Rexland Park Area, or east Greenfield). It is one of Bakersfield's least developed regions. It is primarily industrial, but it also contains residential areas. State Route 58 travels through the region and is the main link between Bakersfield and all southeast points, including Tehachapi, Mojave, and Barstow.

== South Bakersfield ==
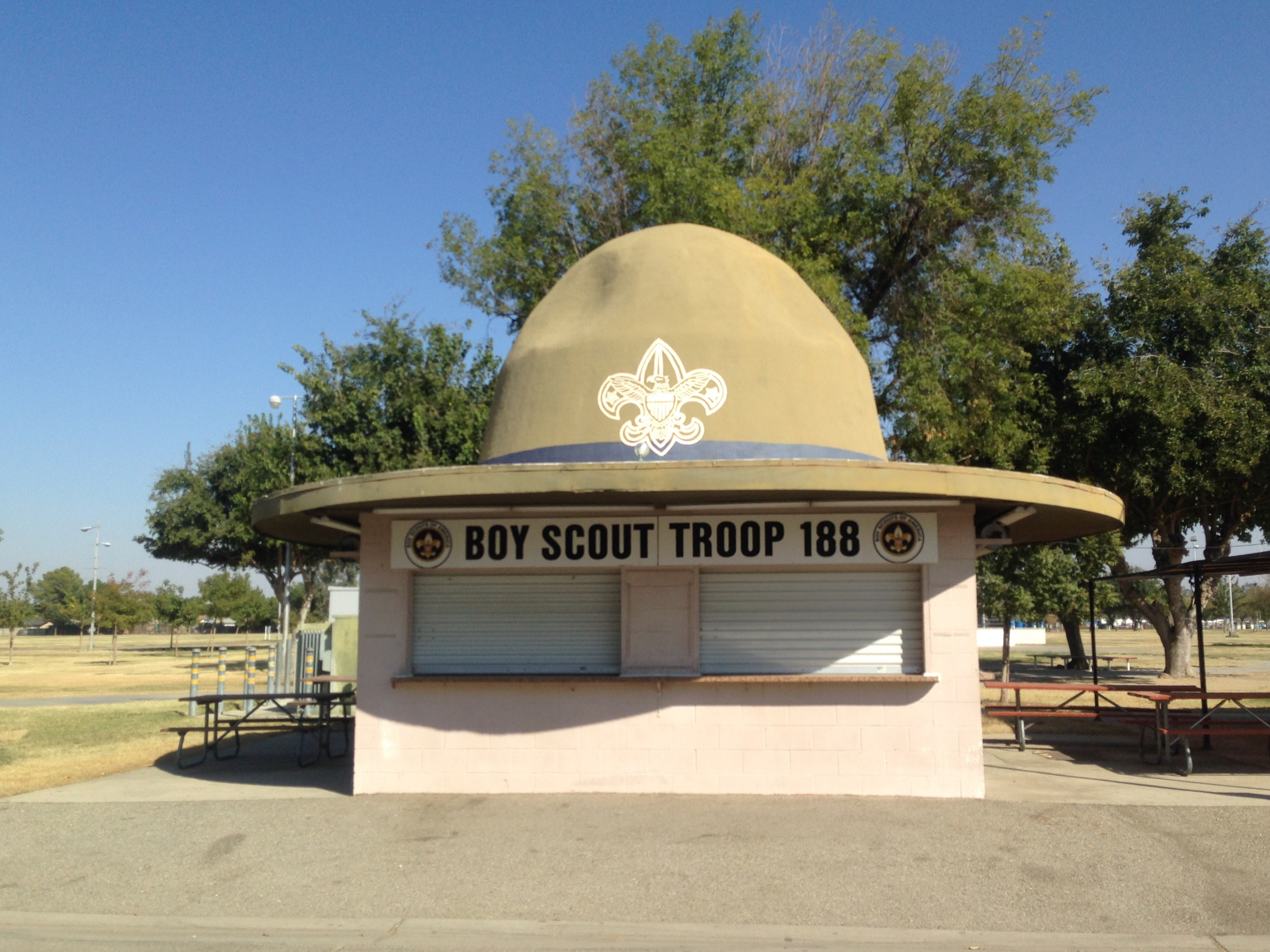
Kern County Fairgrounds

South Bakersfield refers to the area south of State Route 58 that sits between South Union Avenue and Wible Road. This portion of town is primarily residential, although there are some commercial areas. It includes Planz Park, Wilson Park, the Eleanor Wilson Library, and South High School. Major attractions include the Kern County Fairgrounds and the Valley Plaza Mall, although some people consider the mall part of the southwest. South Bakersfield also includes the town of Greenfield. Historically a rural community, this part of the city has grown as far south as Taft Highway.

== Southwest ==
Southwest Bakersfield (commonly referred to simply as The Southwest) refers to the area between the Kern River/Stockdale Highway and Wible Road. The Southwest contains a mixture of residential, commercial, and industrial sectors. The Southwest is home to the Park at River Walk, as well as the Marketplace, a major retail shopping center. It is also home to California State University, Bakersfield.

== Northwest ==
Northwest Bakersfield (commonly referred to simply as The Northwest) refers to the area northwest of central Bakersfield, between the Kern River/Stockdale Highway and State Route 99. Historically a rural area, it saw major development in the mid-1990s that continues to this day. The towns of Fruitvale, Rosedale, and Greenacres used to be isolated, but are now bordered by the city limits. A major retail center is the Northwest Promenade.
