= Quailwood, Bakersfield, California =

Quailwood
- Community in Bakersfield
- Location in California
- Coordinates: 35°21′20″N 119°04′58″W
- Country: United States
- State: California
- County: Kern County
- City: Bakersfield
- Elevation: 384 ft (117 m)

Quailwood is a former unincorporated community now incorporated into Bakersfield in Kern County, California. It lies at an elevation of 384 feet (117 m).
