= Marion Osborn Cunningham =

American artist

- Marion Osborn Cunningham c. 1947
- Born: Marion Osborn; May 29, 1908; South Bend, Indiana
- Died: 1948 (aged 39–40)
- Known for: Lithography, Screenprinting, Watercolor
- Spouse: Ben Cunningham

Marion Osborn Cunningham (1908 - 1948) was an American artist.

== Biography ==
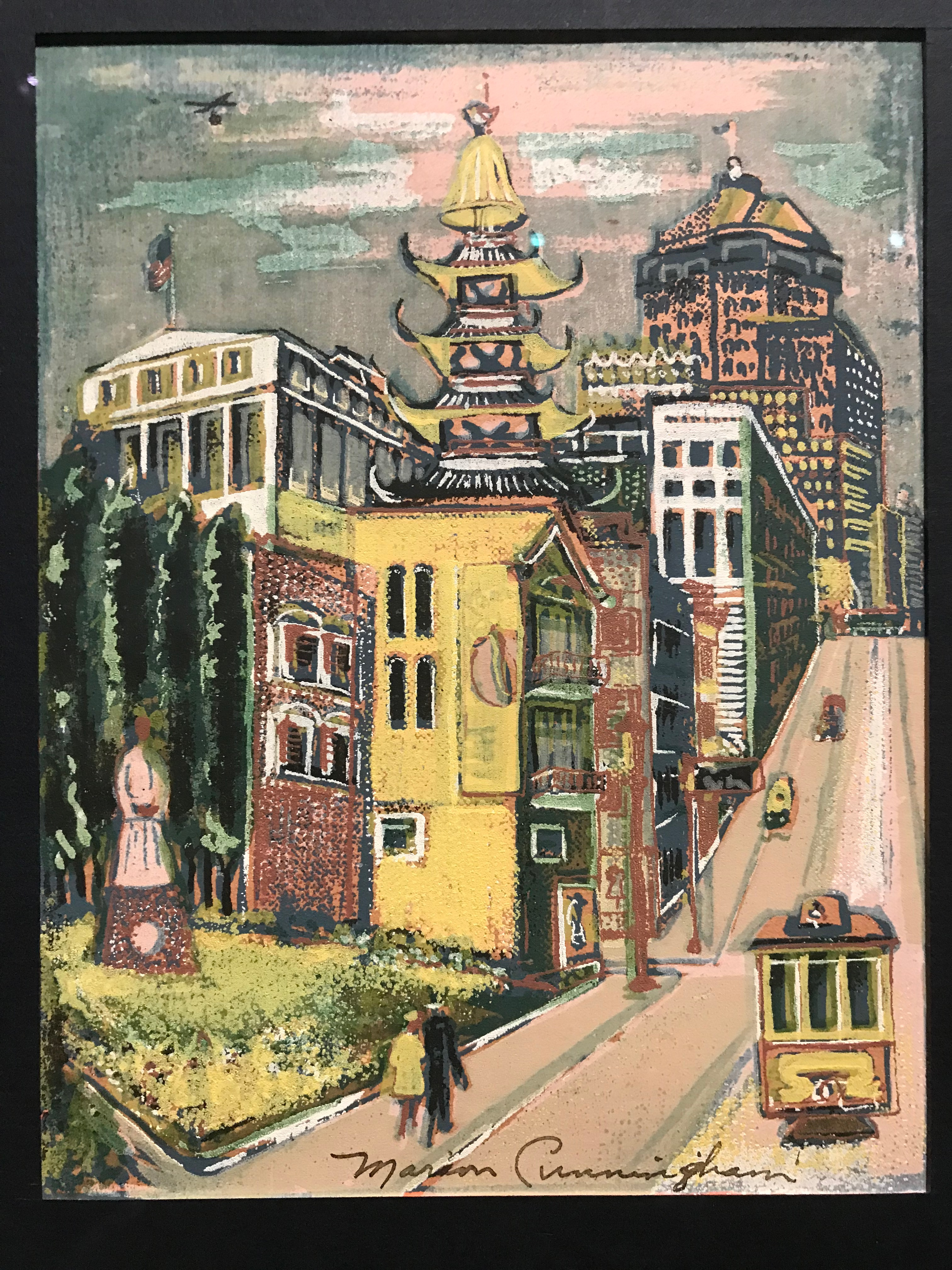
Nob Hill aka St. Mary's Square/California Street with Cable Car, 1935, by Marion Osborn Cunningham.

Cunningham née Osborn was born on May 29, 1908, in South Bend, Indiana. Marion's first formal art instruction was received at Bakersfield High School (then Kern County Union High School) under the tutelage of Mrs. Ruth Emerson. From there, Marion attended Santa Barbara College. She received an AB degree from Stanford University. Marion continued her studies at the California School of Fine Arts (now the San Francisco Art Institute). Marion studied at The Art Students League of New York.

In 1931 she married fellow artist Ben Cunningham. They divorced in 1937.

Cunningham began creating serigraphs in the 1930s. A recurring subject were cable car scenes. She was a member of the National Serigraph Society, the San Francisco Art Association, and the San Francisco Women Artists.

She died in 1948. The Bakersfield Museum of Art's former name, Cunningham Memorial Art Gallery, had been in her namesake and was founded by her family after her death.

Cunningham's work is in the collection of the National Gallery of Art and the Bakersfield Museum of Art. Her work is also in the collections of the Cleveland Museum of Art, the de Young Museum, the Metropolitan Museum of Art, the Museum of Modern Art, the Saint Louis Art Museum and the San Francisco Museum of Modern Art.

== Exhibitions ==
Cunningham exhibited her work from 1935 until her death, and posthumously in a memorial exhibit at San Francisco Museum of Art.

== Gallery ==
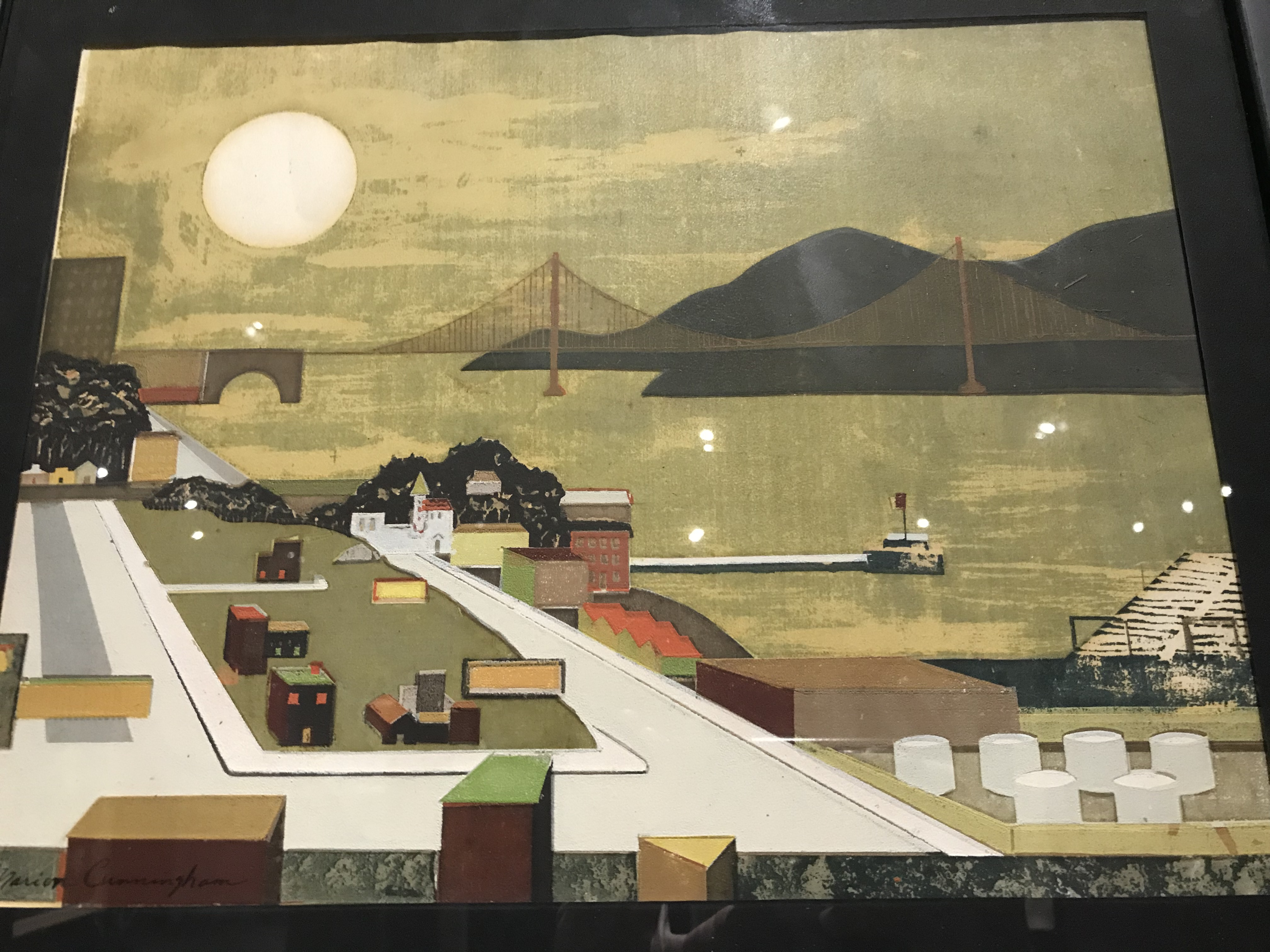
Embarcadero aka The Golden Gate with Moon, 1948, by Marion Osborn Cunningham.

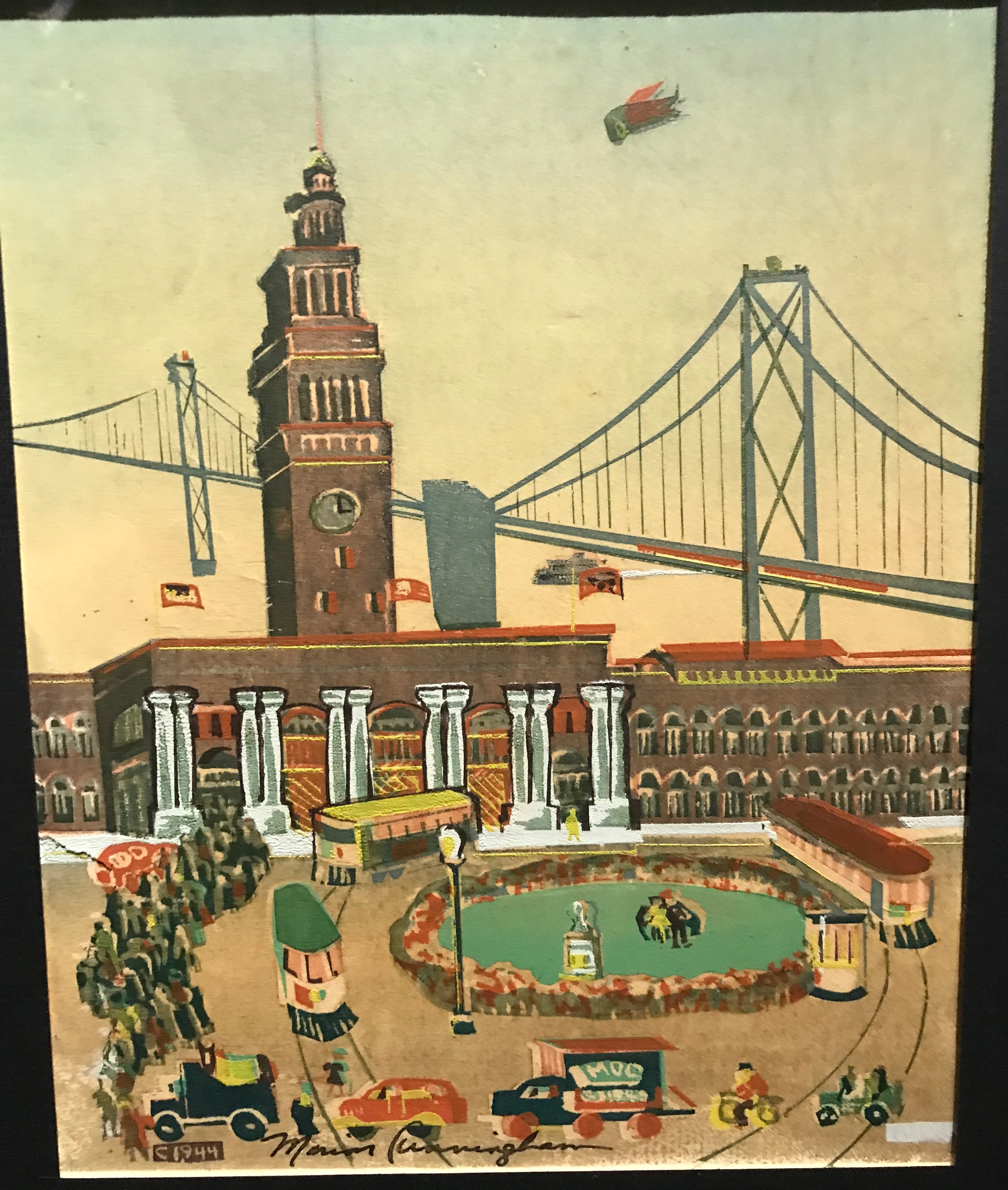
Ferry Building, 1944, by Marion Osborn Cunningham.

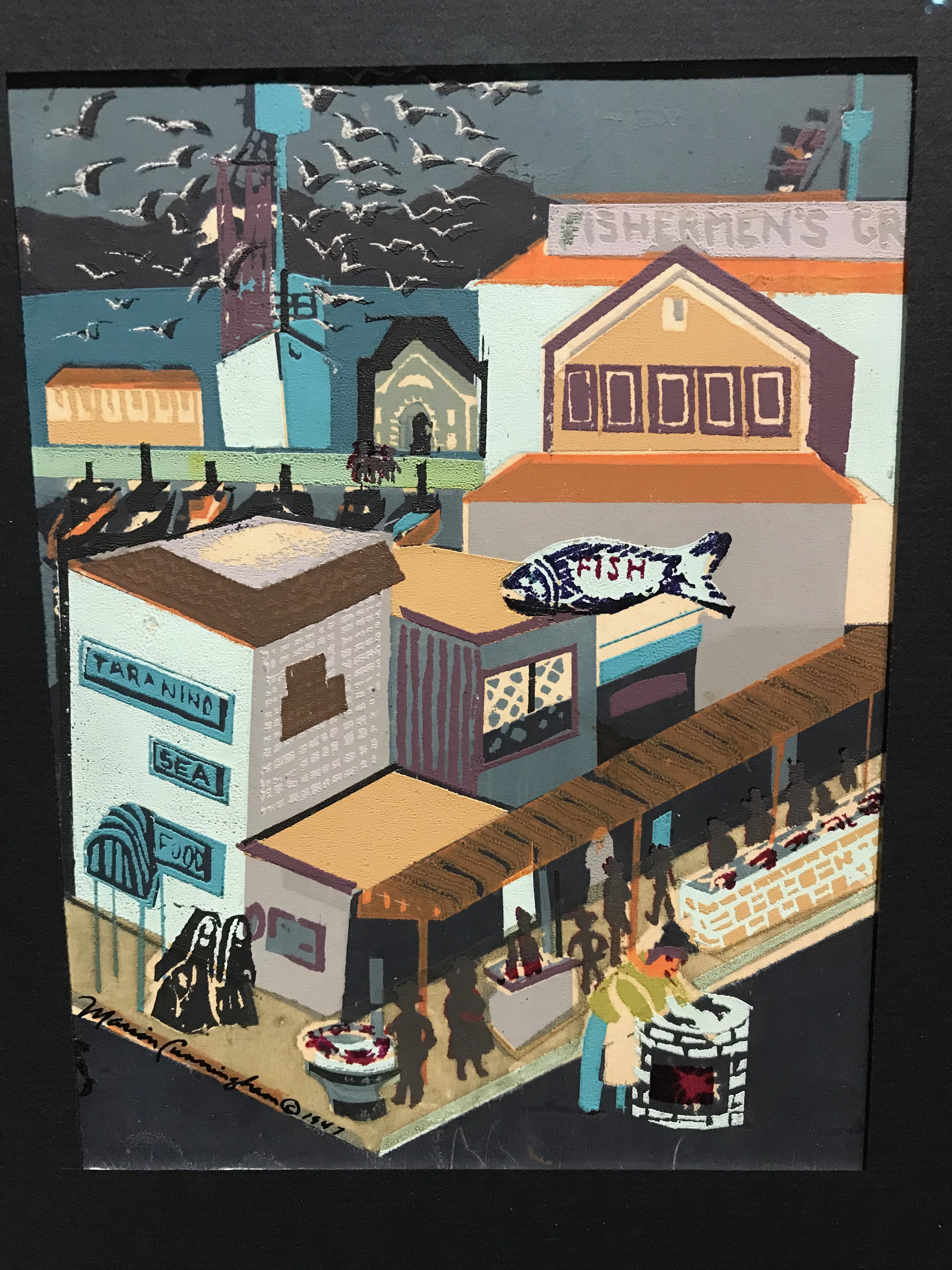
Fisherman's Wharf aka Fisherman's Grotto, 1947, by Marion Osborn Cunningham.
