= Arts District, Bakersfield =

Arts District
- District of Bakersfield
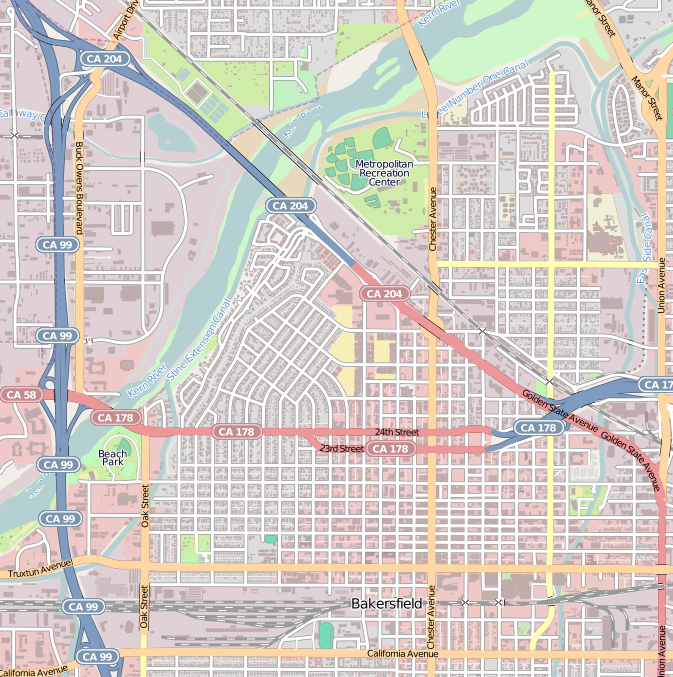
- Location within Downtown Bakersfield Arts District (California)
- Coordinates: 35°22′34″N 119°1′12″W
- Country: United States
- State: California
- County: Kern County
- City: Bakersfield

Arts District is a district in Downtown Bakersfield, California, USA. It is a major center for visual and performing arts. Several art galleries are located in the district, with most of them centered on the intersection of 19th Street and Eye Street. Several theater groups are also located in the district. Its boundaries are marked with banners, which were erected by the Arts Council of Kern.

== Theaters ==
The following theaters are located in the district:

- The Empty Space
- Fox Theater
- Ovation Theater
- Stars Theater

== Transportation ==
The Downtown Transit Center is located in the district. It is one of several transit centers owned and operated by Golden Empire Transit. Several of its routes use the stop, which serves urban Bakersfield. It is also used by Kern Regional Transit as one of its Bakersfield hubs for its inter-regional service.
