= Garcés Memorial Circle =

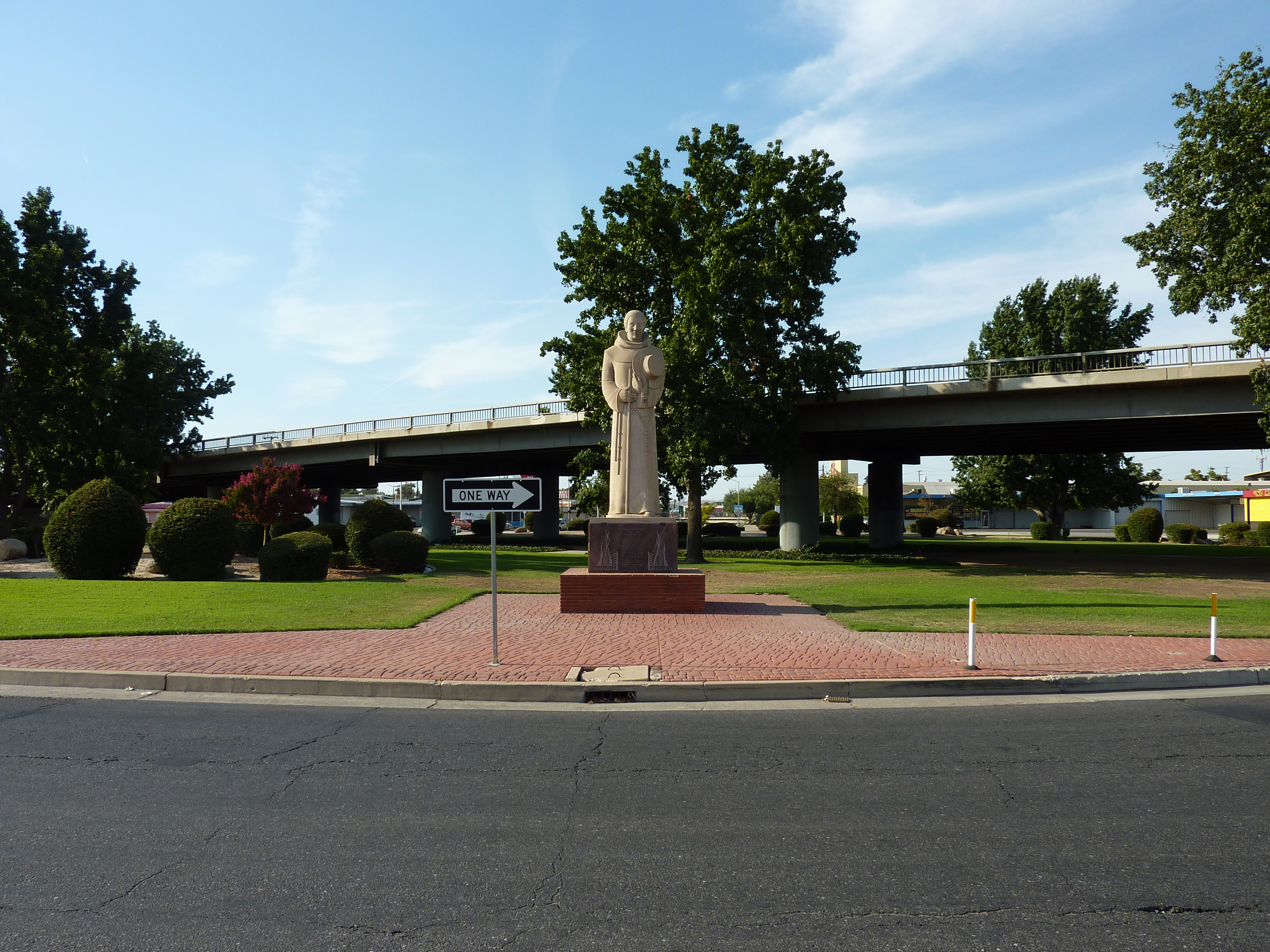
- Sculpture of Padre Francisco Garcés in Garcés Memorial Circle

Location
- Bakersfield, California
- Coordinates: 35.387°N 119.019°W
- Roads at junction: SR 204 (Golden State Avenue); Chester Avenue; 30th Street

Construction
- Type: Traffic circle with an overpass flyover
- Opened: 1932
- Maintained by: Caltrans, City of Bakersfield

California Historical Landmark
- Designated: October 21, 1937
- Reference no.: 277

Garcés Memorial Circle, informally known as Garcés Circle or just The Circle, is a traffic circle in Bakersfield, California. The traffic circle is located at the intersection of Chester Avenue, Golden State Avenue (State Route 204) and 30th Street. An overpass stands over the circle, allowing through traffic on Golden State Avenue to bypass it.

The traffic circle honors Spanish Franciscan friar Francisco Garcés, who served as a missionary and explorer in the colonial Viceroyalty of New Spain. A California Historical Landmark, it was approximately on this site where Garcés visited an Indian rancheria on May 7, 1776.

== History ==
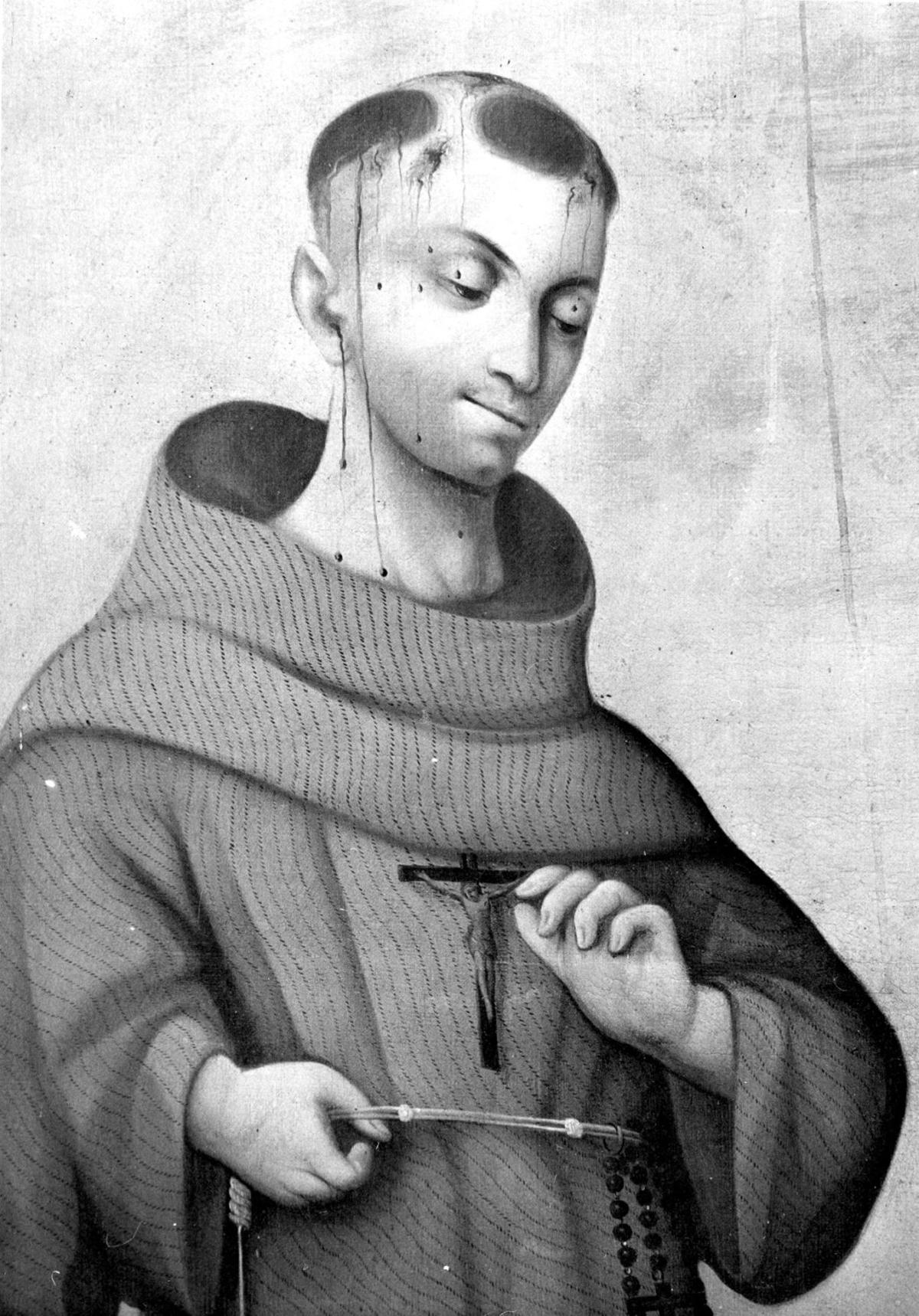
The circle is named after Spanish priest Francisco Garcés, who arrived in the Bakersfield area in 1776.

The Circle was originally built as a part of US 99 in approximately 1932. A large 1939 sculpture of Father Francisco Garcés by John Palo-Kangas rests inside the circle.

At 280 feet (85 m) of inner diameter, the Garcés Memorial Traffic Circle is a smaller sibling of the similar 360-foot (110 m) inner-diameter 1930 Long Beach Traffic Circle located in Long Beach.

== Landmark ==
California Historical Landmark reads:

NO. 277 GARCÉS CIRCLE - This is the approximate site of the Indian rancheria visited by Franciscan friar Padre Francisco Garcés on May 7, 1776. Padre Garcés named this spot San Miguel de los Noches por el Santa Príncipe.

== See also ==
- California Historical Landmarks in Kern County
- California Historical Landmark

== Sources ==
- Historical Tour of US 99 - The Golden State Highway
- Father Garcés Audio Slideshow - Bakersfield Californian
