= Padre Hotel =

Hotel in Bakersfield, California

The Padre Hotel
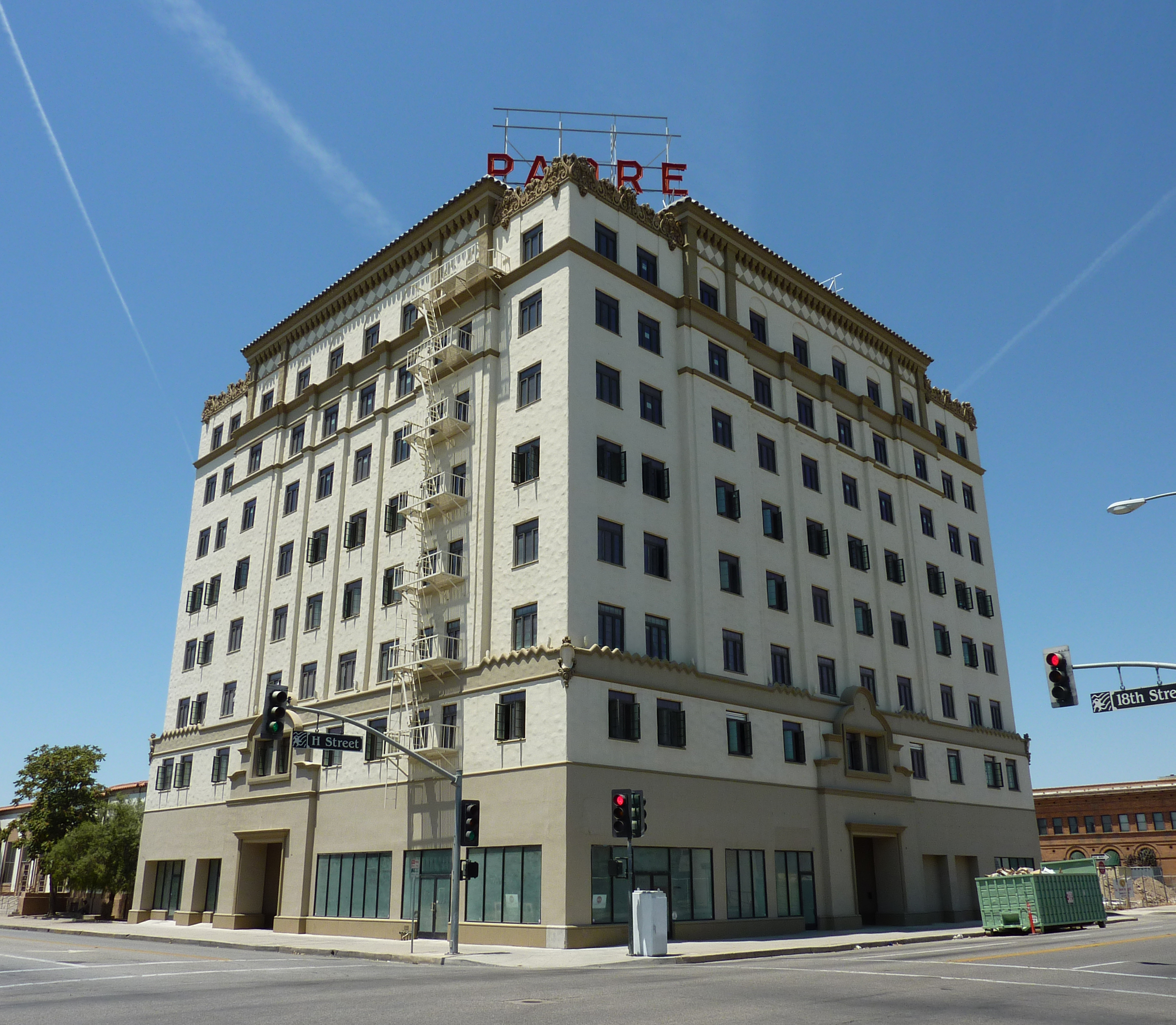
- The Padre Hotel is a longtime landmark in downtown Bakersfield.
- Interactive map of the The Padre Hotel area

General information
- Type: Hotel
- Architectural style: Spanish Colonial Revival
- Location: Bakersfield, California Right across from the Padre is a Public charter school, 1702 18th St
- Coordinates: 35.3754°N 119.0217°W
- Completed: 1928
- Renovated: 2002-2010
- Owner: Padre Partners, LP

Height
- Height: 113.8 feet (34.7 m)

Technical details
- Structural system: Brick and mortar construction
- Floor count: 8
- Lifts/elevators: 2

Design and construction
- Architect: John M. Cooper (1928)

Renovating team
- Architect: Graham Downes

Website
- http://www.thepadrehotel.com

References
- The Padre Hotel; Kern County Museum

The Padre Hotel is a historical landmark hotel located on the corner of 18th and H streets in Bakersfield, California. Originally constructed in 1928 as a luxury hotel and restaurant, the eight-story building went through an extensive renovation and reopened in 2010.

== History ==
Originally built in 1928, the eight-story Spanish Colonial Revival hotel had an auspicious and flamboyant beginning in the Central Valley's early and notorious oil rush days, but none quite so colorful as that of Milton “Spartacus” Miller, who purchased The Padre in 1954. For the next 45 years, he did spirited battle with Bakersfield's city fathers over a myriad of issues, even mounting a fake missile on the roof, defiantly directed at City Hall with no small disdain. Miller died in 1999.

A fire on the seventh floor in the 1950s resulted in many deaths, including children. There have also been many suicides from the roof of the Padre Hotel.

The Padre Hotel fell into disrepair and was a derelict hotel from the 1960s until its most recent renovation in 2010. Prior to that renovation, the upper floors were condemned but often had squatters occupying the rooms. The bar downstairs stayed open.

== Hotel facilities ==
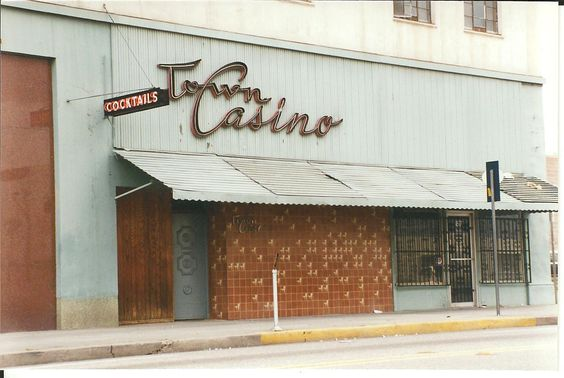
Padre Hotel Bar in the 1980s
