= California State Route 204 =

Highway in California

State Route 204
- SR 204 highlighted in red

Route information
- Maintained by Caltrans
- Length: 6.76 mi (10.88 km)
- Existed: 1933 as LRN 141, 1964 as SR 204–present

Major junctions
- South end: SR 58 in Bakersfield
- SR 178 in Bakersfield
- North end: SR 99 near Oildale

Location
- Country: United States
- State: California
- Counties: Kern

Highway system
- State highways in California; Interstate; US; State; Scenic; History; Pre‑1964; Unconstructed; Deleted; Freeways
← SR 203	→ I-205

State Route 204 (SR 204) is a state highway in the U.S. state of California that connects SR 58 and SR 99 in the Bakersfield area. Passing through downtown Bakersfield, SR 204 also connects Bakersfield's three major freeways together (SR 99, SR 58, and SR 178). Only the northern 1.4 miles (2.3 km) has been built to freeway standards; the rest is a six-lane arterial road.

All of SR 204 is a part of California State Route 99 Business (SR 99 Bus.). The business route continues south of SR 58 to Greenfield en route to SR 99.

== Route description ==
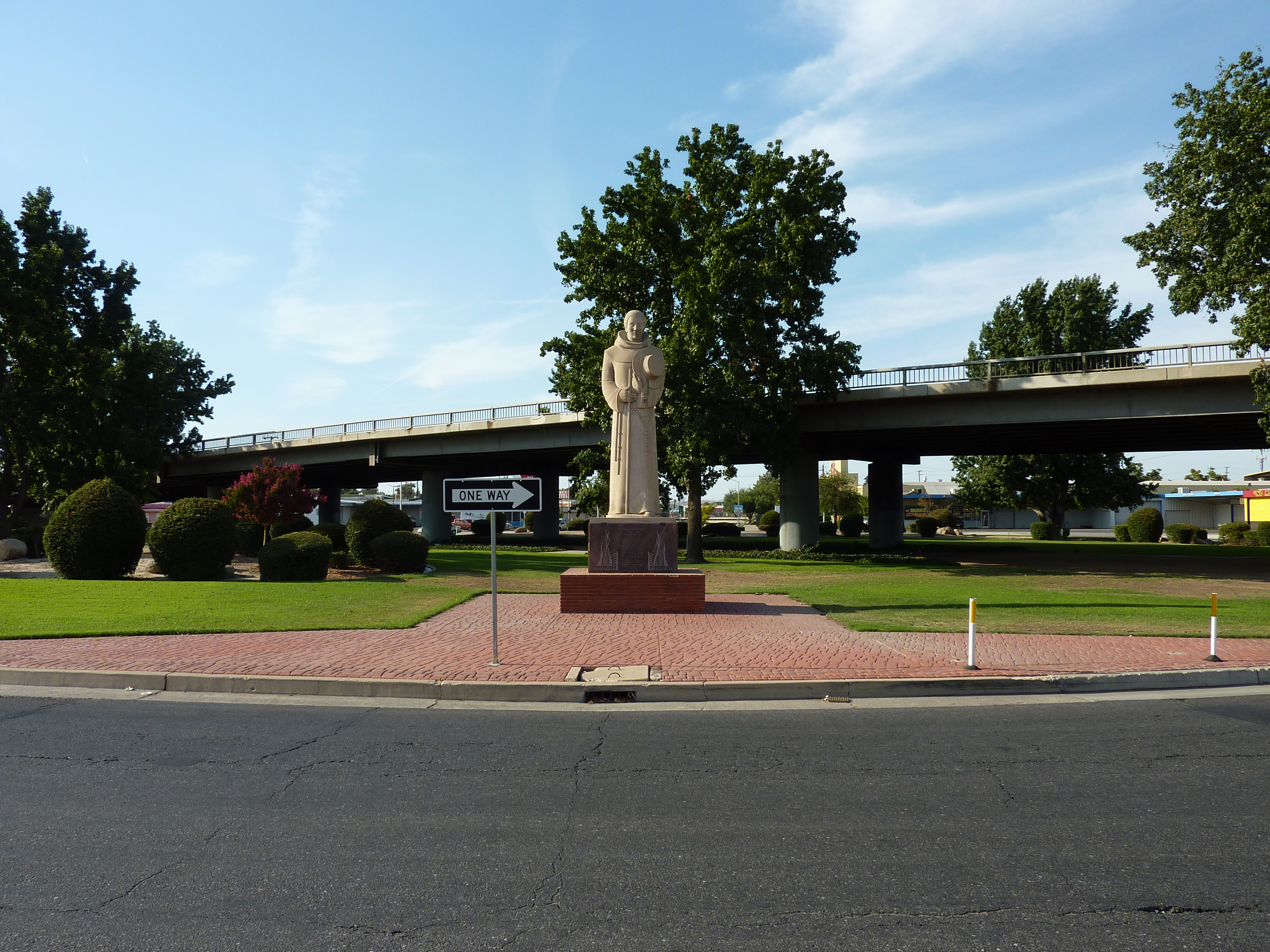
Garces Circle with SR 204 crossing over it

Route 204 is defined in section 504, subsection (a), of the California Streets and Highways Code, and that the highway is "from Route 58 to Route 99 near Bakersfield via Union Avenue and Golden State Avenue". In addition, subdivision (b) permits the state to relinquish control of the portion of Route 204 located within Bakersfield to the city.

SR 204 begins as a six-lane arterial at SR 58. From there, SR 204 travels north on Union Avenue, while SR 99 Bus. continues in the opposite direction on Union Avenue south. After intersecting California Avenue, SR 204 crosses underneath the Truxtun Avenue interchange. At the Union Avenue wye intersection, the route heads northwest on Golden State Avenue. It crosses under SR 178 and over the Garces Circle, which provides access to Downtown Bakersfield. The route then crosses F Street, at which point it becomes a four-lane freeway. The route crosses its only numbered interchange at Airport Drive, and then terminates at SR 99.

SR 204 is part of the National Highway System, a network of highways that are considered essential to the country's economy, defense, and mobility by the Federal Highway Administration.

== History ==
Before the 1964 renumbering, State Route 204 was known as Legislative Route 141. It was created in 1933 as a western bypass to Bakersfield via Brundage Lane and Oak Street. At that time, US 99 (defined by the State as Legislative Route 4) ran through Bakersfield via Chester Avenue, and through Oildale (north of Bakersfield) via Roberts Lane. LRN 141 started at the intersection of US 99 (Chester Avenue) and Brundage Lane, where it traveled west to Oak Street. At Oak Street, the route turned north, crossed the Kern River, and terminated at US 99 (Roberts Lane) near Beardsley School in Oildale.

In the mid-1930s, US 99 was moved from Chester Avenue/Roberts Lane to Union Avenue/Golden State Avenue. During the late 1950s, the Union Avenue wye, Truxtun Avenue interchange, and Chester Avenue interchange (with the bridge over Garces Circle) were constructed to improve traffic flow. However, when the US 99 freeway bypass was constructed in 1963, Caltrans decided to use the Oak Street route around the city instead of the Union Avenue route through the city. As a result, the route designations were swapped. The freeway parallel to Oak Street would become US 99. LRN 141 would become the US 99 bypass via Brundage Lane, Union Avenue, and Golden State Avenue. That designation never took effect because in 1964 all of the state highways were renumbered. As a result, LRN 141 became SR 204. Its definition was also simplified to bypass SR 99 via Union Avenue and Golden State Avenue, although that change lengthened the route. In 1978, the route was shortened to connect SR 58 to SR 99 via Union Avenue and Golden State Avenue, which was closer to the original 1963 definition.

== Future ==
Bakersfield has considered several times to convert all or part of SR 204 to a freeway. In 1986, part of the route was considered as the western extension of SR 178. However, that study (which was not a formal route adoption study) recommended another alignment for the freeway. In 2001, Bakersfield’s system study proposed converting all of SR 204 to a freeway as part of the western extension of SR 58. However, that proposal has been dropped in favor of the Westside Parkway connection (known as the Centennial Corridor).

== Major intersections ==
Except where prefixed with a letter, postmiles were measured on the road as it was in 1964, based on the alignment that existed at the time, and do not necessarily reflect current mileage. Postmile prefixes include: R reflecting a realignment in the route since then, M indicating a second realignment, L referring to an overlap due to a correction or change, and T indicating postmiles classified as temporary. Segments that remain unconstructed or have been relinquished to local control may be omitted. The entire route is in Bakersfield, Kern County.

Postmile	Exit	Destinations	Notes
0.00		SR 99 Bus. south (Union Avenue)	Continuation beyond SR 58; former US 99 south / SR 204 south
R0.00– R0.10		SR 58 to SR 99 – Mojave	Interchange; south end of SR 99 Bus. overlap; south end of SR 204; SR 58 exit 112
2.07		Brundage Lane, East Brundage Lane	
3.09		California Avenue, East California Avenue	
3.41		Truxtun Avenue	Interchange
3.76		Union Avenue to SR 178	
4.06		24th Street to SR 178 west	
4.24		SR 178 east – Lake Isabella	Interchange; southbound exit and northbound entrance; SR 178 exit 2A westbound
4.88		Chester Avenue	Interchange; SR 204 crosses over the Garces Memorial Circle
	South end of freeway		
6.46	6	Airport Drive, Buck Owens Boulevard to SR 99 south	Interchange; Buck Owens Boulevard not signed northbound; Airport Drive serves Meadows Field Airport
6.75		SR 99 north – Fresno, Sacramento	Northbound exit and southbound entrance; north end of SR 99 Bus. overlap; north end of SR 204; former US 99 north / US 466 west; SR 99 exit 27 southbound
1.000 mi = 1.609 km; 1.000 km = 0.621 mi: Concurrency terminus; Incomplete access
