= Kern City, Bakersfield, California =

Kern City
- Community in Bakersfield
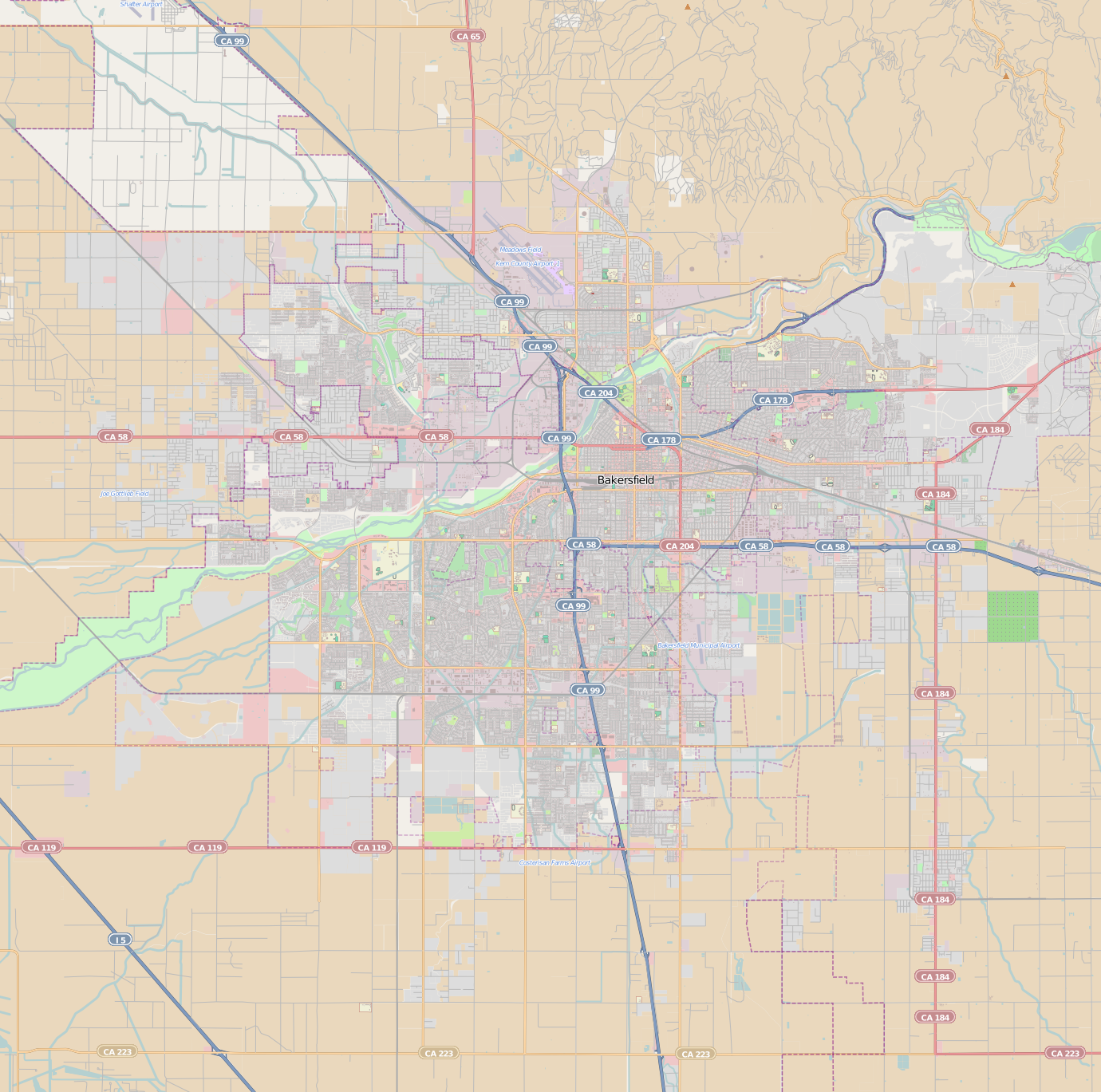
- Location within Bakersfield
- Coordinates: 35°21′14″N 119°04′24″W
- Country: United States
- State: California
- County: Kern County
- City: Bakersfield
- Elevation: 387 ft (118 m)

Kern City is a former unincorporated community now incorporated in Bakersfield in Kern County, California. It is located 4 miles (6.4 km) west-southwest of downtown Bakersfield, at an elevation of 387 feet (118 m).

Kern City was founded as a planned retirement community in 1961. It was developed by Del Webb and constructed by his namesake company the Del E. Webb Corporation. A post office operated at Kern City from 1962 to 1976.

In 2010, there were 1,024 dwelling units (individual homes or condos) within the Kern City association. At that time, the association had an elected board of directors made up of 9 property owners, three elected each year for a three-year term.
