= Santa Barbara Business College =

Defunct for-profit college in California, United States

Coordinates: 34.41610°N 119.69661°W

- Motto: A Tradition of Success Since 1888
- Type: Private college, for-profit
- Active: 1888–January 2020
- Location: Bakersfield, Santa Maria, Rancho Mirage, Ventura, California, United States
- Campus: Bakersfield, Santa Maria, Rancho Mirage, Ventura
- Nickname: SBBCollege
- Website: sbbcollege.edu (archived)

Santa Barbara Business College (SBBCollege) was a private for-profit college from 1888 to 2020, located in Southern California, United States. The college was founded in 1888 as a co-ed finishing college in Santa Barbara. It expanded its program fields and campus locations to four physical campuses and one online campus. The college was acquired by the private for-profit San Joaquin Valley College in January 2020.

== Accreditations ==
SBBCollege is accredited by the Accrediting Council for Independent Colleges and Schools to award certificates, diplomas, associate degrees, bachelor's degrees and master's degrees. The vocational nursing program is at SBBCollege accredited by the State of California Board of Vocational Nursing and Psychiatric Technicians.

== History ==
SBBCollege is one of the oldest colleges in California. Founded in 1888, the College educated area teachers and offered business college courses in banking, merchandising, shorthand, typing and business law.

Over the years, SBBCollege added new programs to meet the demands of emerging industries and expanded to five communities in Southern California. During the last part of the 20th century, the College added medical, legal and information technology programs. Recently, SBBCollege added bachelor's degrees in business administration, criminal justice and healthcare administration and an MBA program.

On January 2, 2020, SBBCollege was acquired by San Joaquin Valley College. Subsequently, all SBBCollege campuses are no longer enrolling students.

== Locations ==
SBBCollege currently has campuses in the following California communities, including an online campus:

- Santa Maria
  - 303 E Plaza Drive, Santa Maria, CA 93454
  - Programs offered: Business Administration, Criminal Justice, Medical Assisting, Pharmacy Technology, Healthcare Administration, Medical Billing and Coding, Vocational Nursing, and Medical Office Administration.
- Bakersfield
  - 5300 California Ave., Bakersfield, CA 93304
  - Programs offered: Business Administration, Criminal Justice, Paralegal Studies, Healthcare Administration, Medical Billing and Coding, Medical Assisting, Vocational Nursing, and Medical Office Administration.
- Ventura
  - 4839 Market Street, Ventura, CA 93003
  - Programs offered: Business Administration, Criminal Justice, Paralegal Studies, Healthcare Administration, Medical Billing and Coding, Medical Office Administration, Medical Assisting and Aviation.
- Rancho Mirage
  - 34-275 Monterey Avenue, Rancho Mirage, California 92270
  - Programs offered: Business Administration, Criminal Justice, Paralegal Studies, Medical Assisting, Healthcare Administration, Medical Billing and Coding, Vocational Nursing, and Medical Office Administration.
- Online
  - Programs offered: Business Administration, Criminal Justice, Paralegal Studies, Healthcare Administration, Medical Billing and Coding, Medical Office Administration and an online MBA program.
