= Mill Creek (Bakersfield) =

Park in Bakersfield, California, United States

Central Park / Mill Creek
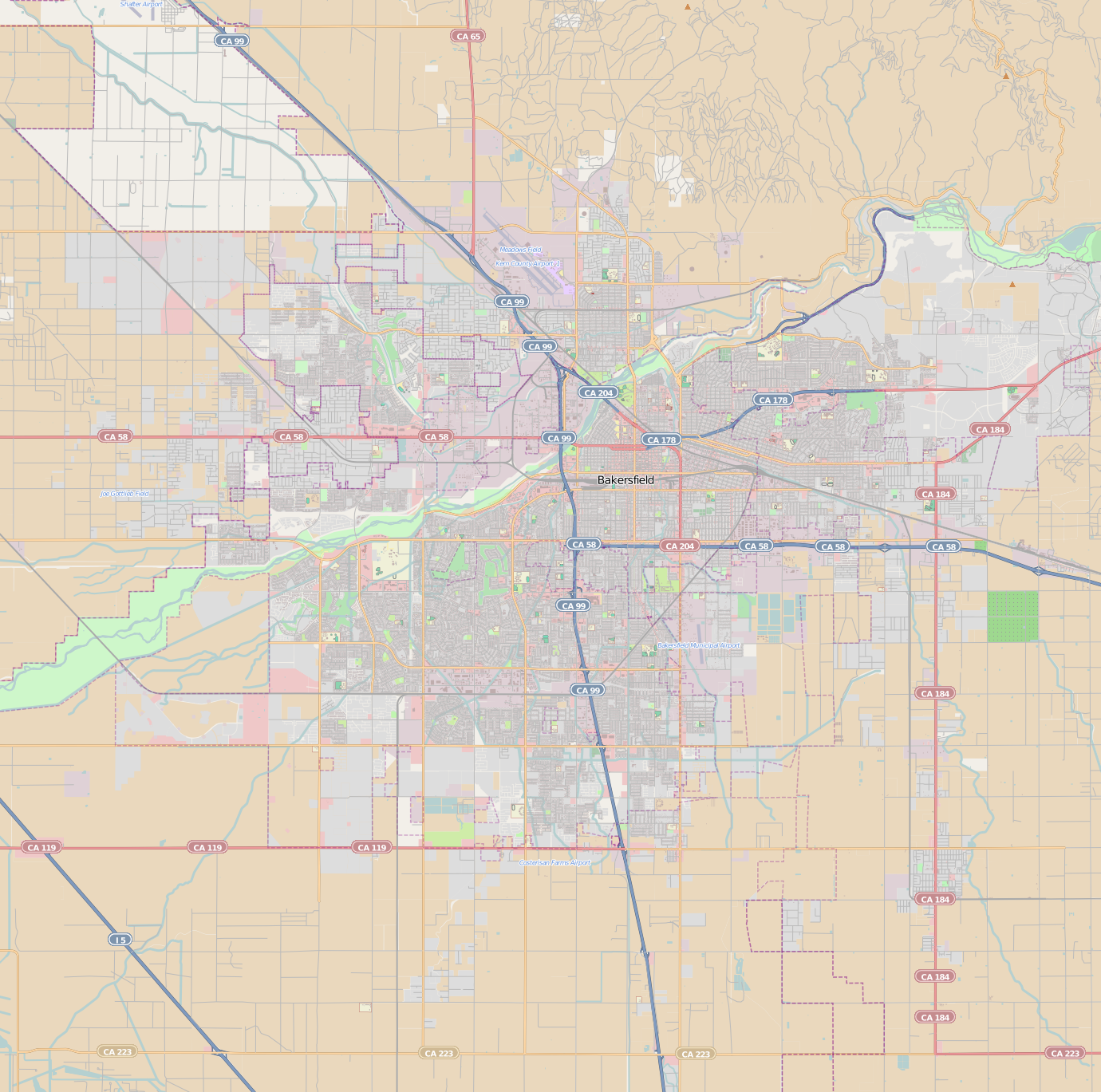
- Location within Bakersfield, California Location within California
- Type: Linear Park
- Location: Bakersfield, California
- Coordinates: 35°22′36″N 119°00′28″W
- Area: 1.5 miles (2.4 km)
- Created: 1921 (Central Park), 2009 (Mill Creek)
- Operator: Bakersfield Department of Recreation and Parks
- Status: All year

Mill Creek is a linear park located in Bakersfield, California. It runs along the Kern Island Canal between Golden State Avenue and California Avenue in downtown, although there is a gap between 19th Street and the BNSF railroad yard. The center of the park is Central Park, the only park in downtown. The park contains a lake with spray fountains and the “Mill Creek” bridge. It is also home to the Bakersfield Museum of Art and the Bakersfield Community House.

The park is named after a flour mill which was located on 17th Street.

== History ==
Central Park was created August 21, 1921. The same day, a bid was accepted from MacRori and McLaren Company for its construction. Originally called Stark Park (for about one month), the name was changed to Central Park since the park was located between Bakersfield and East Bakersfield. In 1938 the first foot bridge was constructed over the canal. In 1956, part of the land was used for the Cunningham Memorial Art Gallery (later the Bakersfield Museum of Art). A camellia garden was added in 1956 in memory of Aram Adams (who was a local automobile dealer). In 1964, another section of the park was used for the establishment of the Community House.

In 2001, city planners started to consider how to redevelop the area. After years of planning, and raising funds, the Mill Creek project was born. The plan was to create a linear park which would run along the Kern Island Canal. The canal would be altered to look like a natural stream. A path would be created next to the canal, on the old access roads. The plan also called for the redevelopment of Central Park (which the canal ran through). This included constructing winding paths, replace lighting, and expanding the canal to a lake. The bridge across the canal was replaced with the covered “Mill Creek” bridge. The park reopened in 2009. The rest of the linear park opened in 2010.

== Park description ==
The length of the park is approximately 1.5 miles (including the gap segments). The path runs along both sides of the canal, except between Golden State Avenue and 21st Street, where it only runs on the west side. That segment is also lined with an iron fence (with pedestrian gates), since it primarily runs next to a residential neighborhood. Central Park has public restrooms, as well as a playground. It is also equipped with Wi-Fi service (for a fee).

There is a gap in the park, between 19th Street and the BNSF railroad yard. Access across the yard is provided by the Q Street underpass. The section between the yard and Truxtun Avenue was not changed since it was already improved when the Beale Memorial Library was built in 1988. The section between Truxtun Avenue and 19th Street could not be improved because the parking lots and buildings of the Hill House (a Best Western Plus hotel) were constructed too close to the canal to allow for improvements at the present time.

== Future ==
The construction of Mill Creek is only the beginning of the changes in the area. In the near future, a four-story office building and a waterfront condominium complex will be constructed next to the new “river.” There will also be a senior center and an apartment complex built near the new development. The east side of Central Park will be the location of a new federal courthouse. In addition, located near the railroad yard is a possible location for a California High Speed Rail train station.
