= Kern County Library =

Public library system in Kern County, California, U.S.

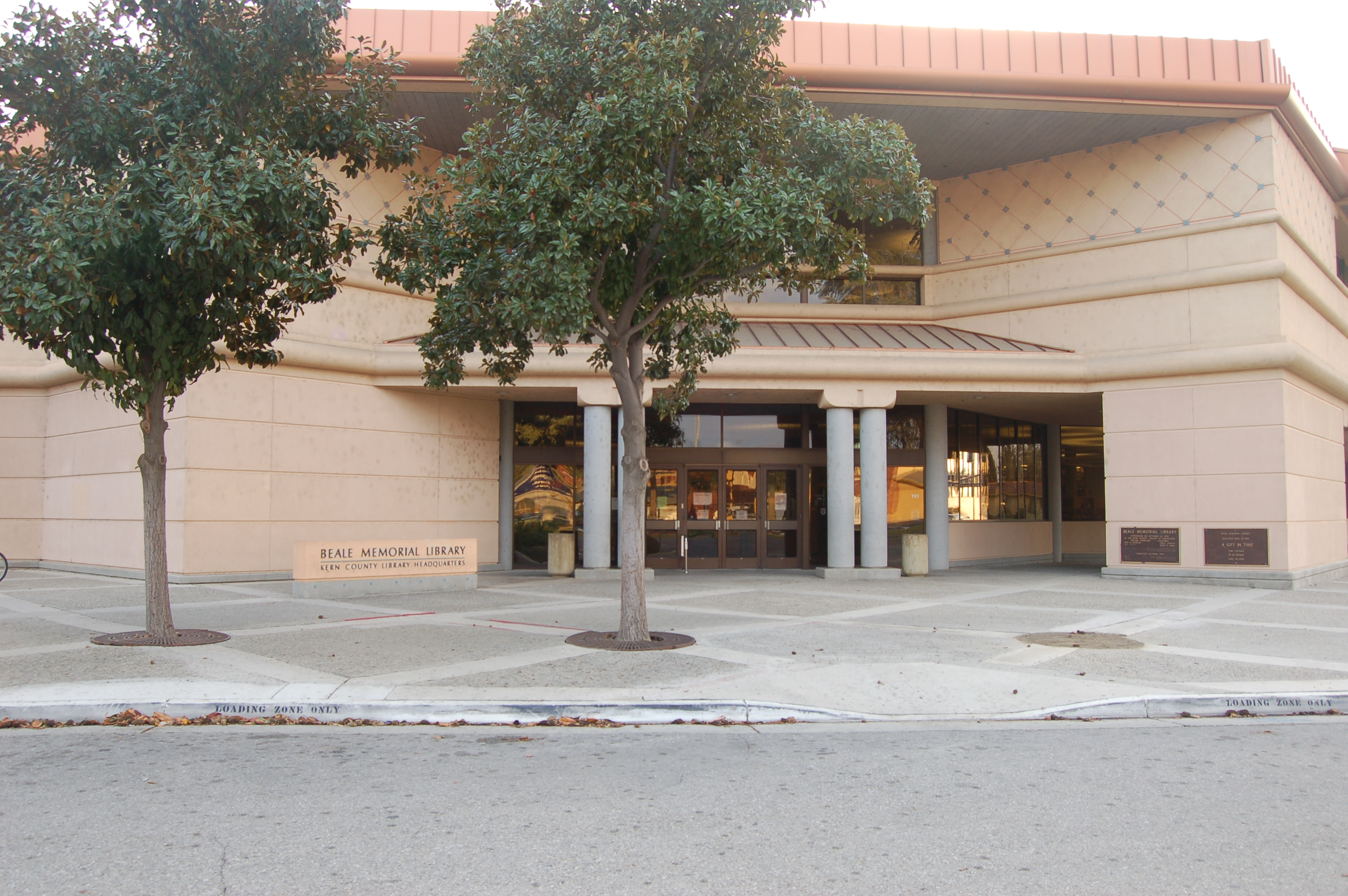
- Beale Memorial Library Entrance
- 35.373°N 119.010°W
- Location: Kern County, California, United States
- Type: Public Library
- Established: 1900
- Branches: 24

Collection
- Size: 1.098 million

Access and use
- Circulation: 1,554,073 (2011)
- Population served: 800,000+
- Members: 175,000+

Other information
- Budget: $8 million
- Director: Andy Sullivan
- Employees: 126 Paid Staff; 901 Volunteer
- Website: kerncountylibrary.org
- References: Kern County Library

The Kern County Library is a public library system serving the residents of Kern County, California. The library system is headquartered at the Beale Memorial Library in Downtown Bakersfield. There are additional branches located throughout Kern County. The library is also a part of the San Joaquin Valley Library System (SJVLS), which is a corporative network of library systems located throughout the San Joaquin Valley.

The system contains a variety of material, including: books, audio/visual material, periodicals, and government documents. The Beale Memorial Library also contains special collections. These include: historical maps, historical photography, fine arts collection, genealogy, grant research, and local history. There is also a collection about local geology, mining, and petroleum.

A library card is required for checking out material. All California residents are eligible for a library card. It also allows access to library resources over the internet.

== Beale Memorial Library ==
The first free library in the county was the Beale Memorial Library. It was created in 1900 by Mary Edwards Beale and her son Truxtun Beale. It was dedicated to the memory of their husband and father, General Edward Fitzgerald Beale. The Kern County Library System (originally called the Kern County Free Library) was organized on July 11, 1911. It would adopt the Beale Memorial Library as its headquarters.

The existing building served the needs of the system until 1952, when it was destroyed by the Kern County earthquake. The new library was completed in 1957 and was used for the next 30 years. By the mid 1980s, that building became too small to hold the growing collection. In 1988, the library was moved to its current location at 701 Truxtun Ave.

== Branches ==
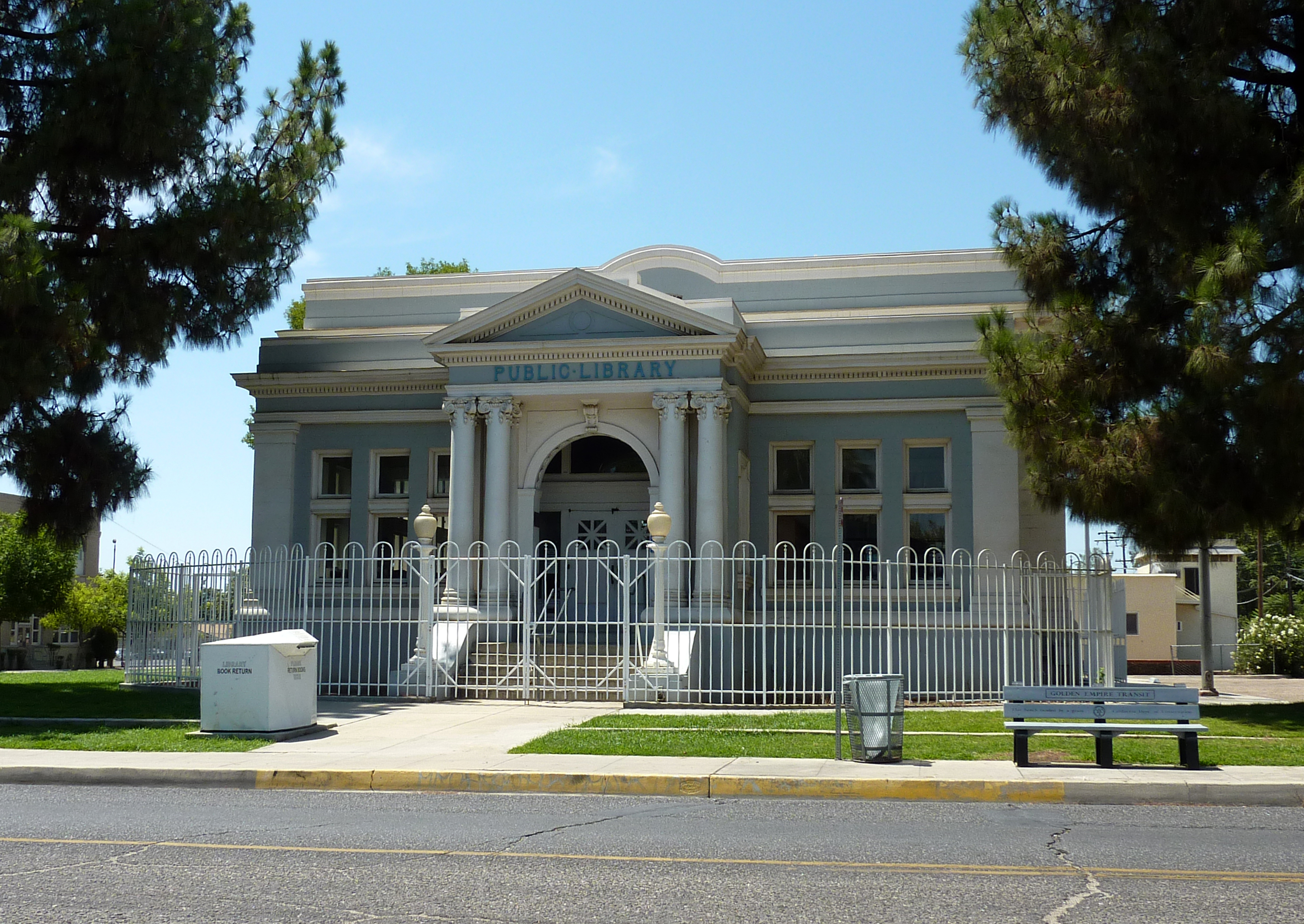
Baker Branch

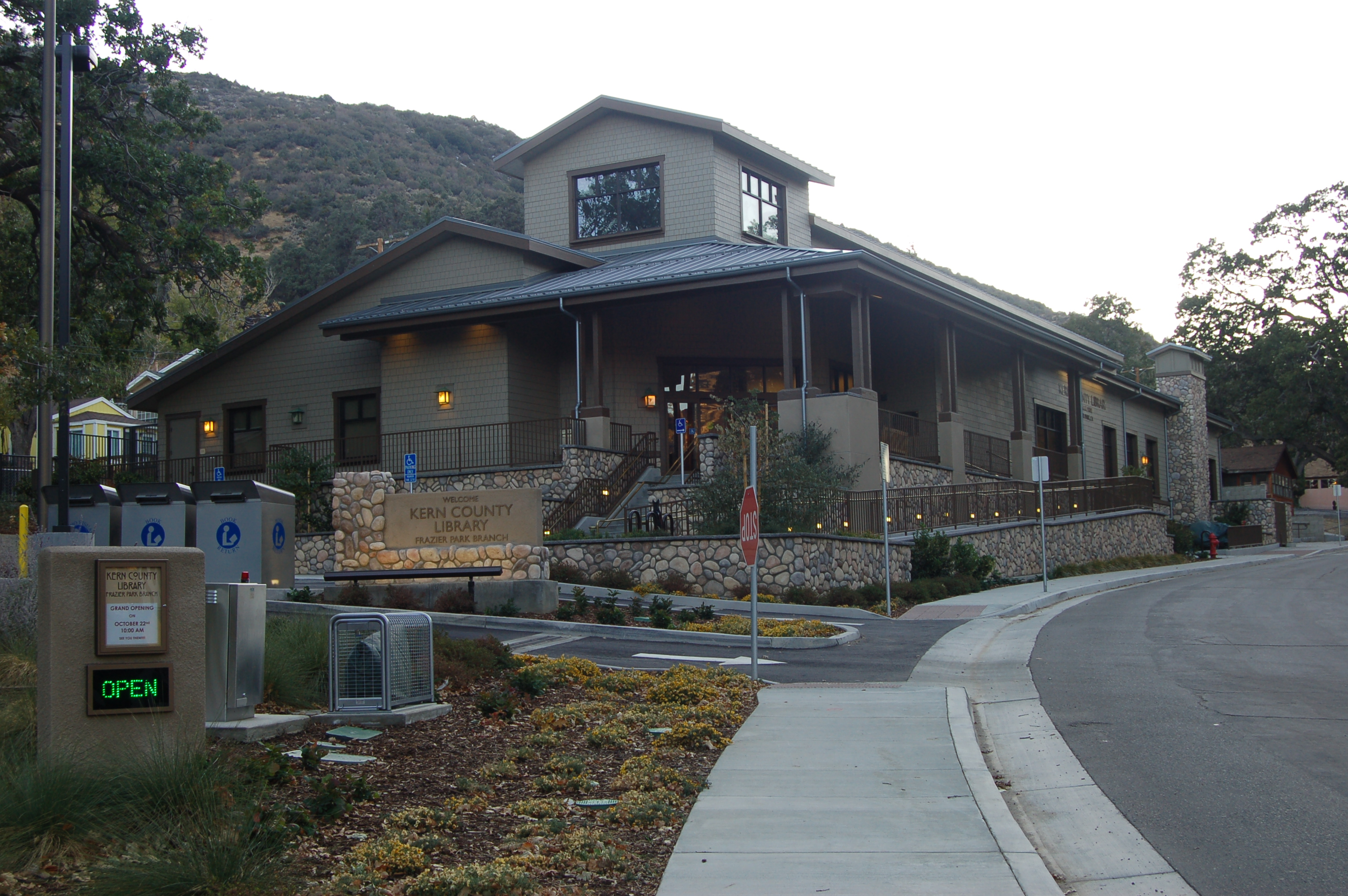
Frazier Park Branch

In addition to the Beale Memorial Library in Downtown Bakersfield, there are 23 additional branches throughout Kern County. They include 6 branches that serve Greater Bakersfield.

- Arvin Branch
- Baker Branch (East Bakersfield)
- Boron Branch
- Bryce C. Rathbun Branch (North Bakersfield)
- Buttonwillow Branch
- California City Branch
- Clara M. Jackson Branch (McFarland)
- Delano Branch
- Eleanor Wilson Branch (South Bakersfield)
- Frazier Park Branch
- Holloway-Gonzales Branch (Southeast Bakersfield)
- Kern River Valley Branch
- Lamont Branch
- Mojave Branch
- Northeast Branch (Northeast Bakersfield)
- Ridgecrest Branch
- Shafter Branch
- Southwest Branch (Southwest Bakersfield)
- Taft Branch
- Tehachapi Branch
- Wanda Kirk Branch (Rosamond)
- Wasco Branch
- Wofford Heights Branch

There are also two Bookmobiles that operate in Kern County. They are mobile libraries that travel to different locations in the county. One operates in Bakersfield and surrounding rural areas, while the other operates in the Kern River Valley.

== See also ==
- Kern County, California
