= Greenfield, Kern County, California =

Greenfield
- census-designated place
- Location in Kern County and the state of California

- Location in California
- Coordinates: 35°16′08″N 119°00′10″W
- Country: United States
- State: California
- County: Kern

Area
  - Total: 1.332 sq mi (3.450 km^{2})
  - Land: 1.332 sq mi (3.450 km^{2})
  - Water: 0 sq mi (0 km^{2}) 0%
- Elevation: 351 ft (107 m)

Population (2020)
  - Total: 3,447
  - Density: 2,588/sq mi (999.1/km^{2})
- Time zone: UTC-8 (Pacific (PST))
  - Summer (DST): UTC-7 (PDT)
- GNIS feature IDs: 243007; 2628815

Greenfield (formerly Delkern) is a census-designated place in Kern County, California, United States. It is located 7 miles (11 km) south of Bakersfield, at an elevation of 351 feet (107 m). The population was 3,447 at the 2020 census.

The Delkern post office was opened in 1949. That name derives from Kern Delta, a designation for the surrounding area.

== Demographics ==
Historical population
Census	Pop.	Note	%±
2010	3,991		—
2020	3,477		−12.9%
U.S. Decennial Census; 1860–1870 1880-1890; 1900 1910 1920; 1930 1940 1950; 1960 1970 1980; 1990 2000 2010; 2020

Greenfield first appeared as a census designated place in the 2010 U.S. census.

=== Racial and ethnic composition ===
Greenfield CDP, California – Racial and ethnic composition Note: the US Census treats Hispanic/Latino as an ethnic category. This table excludes Latinos from the racial categories and assigns them to a separate category. Hispanics/Latinos may be of any race.
Race / Ethnicity (NH = Non-Hispanic)	Pop 2010	Pop 2020	% 2010	% 2020
White alone (NH)	1,519	773	38.06%	22.43%
Black or African American alone (NH)	61	76	1.53%	2.20%
Native American or Alaska Native alone (NH)	34	11	0.85%	0.32%
Asian alone (NH)	45	29	1.13%	0.84%
Native Hawaiian or Pacific Islander alone (NH)	1	2	0.03%	0.06%
Other race alone (NH)	1	10	0.03%	0.29%
Mixed race or Multiracial (NH)	67	76	1.68%	2.20%
Hispanic or Latino (any race)	2,263	2,470	56.70%	71.66%
Total	3,991	3,447	100.00%	100.00%

=== 2020 census ===
The 2020 United States census reported that Greenfield had a population of 3,447. The population density was 2,587.8 inhabitants per square mile (999.2/km^{2}). The racial makeup of Greenfield was 34.0% White, 2.4% African American, 1.4% Native American, 0.8% Asian, 0.1% Pacific Islander, 39.5% from other races, and 21.7% from two or more races. Hispanic or Latino of any race were 71.7% of the population.

The census reported that 99.8% of the population lived in households, 7 people (0.2%) lived in non-institutionalized group quarters, and no one was institutionalized.

There were 1,041 households, out of which 43.1% included children under the age of 18, 55.1% were married-couple households, 9.4% were cohabiting couple households, 20.0% had a female householder with no partner present, and 15.5% had a male householder with no partner present. 15.0% of households were one person, and 5.3% were one person aged 65 or older. The average household size was 3.3. There were 838 families (80.5% of all households).

The age distribution was 26.5% under the age of 18, 10.1% aged 18 to 24, 25.0% aged 25 to 44, 25.1% aged 45 to 64, and 13.2% who were 65 years of age or older. The median age was 35.5 years. For every 100 females, there were 101.5 males.

There were 1,070 housing units at an average density of 803.3 units per square mile (310.2 units/km^{2}), of which 1,041 (97.3%) were occupied. Of these, 67.5% were owner-occupied, and 32.5% were occupied by renters.

In 2023, the US Census Bureau estimated that the median household income in 2023 was $71,930, and the per capita income was $22,635. About 10.2% of families and 16.1% of the population were below the poverty line.
