= Bakersfield Museum of Art =

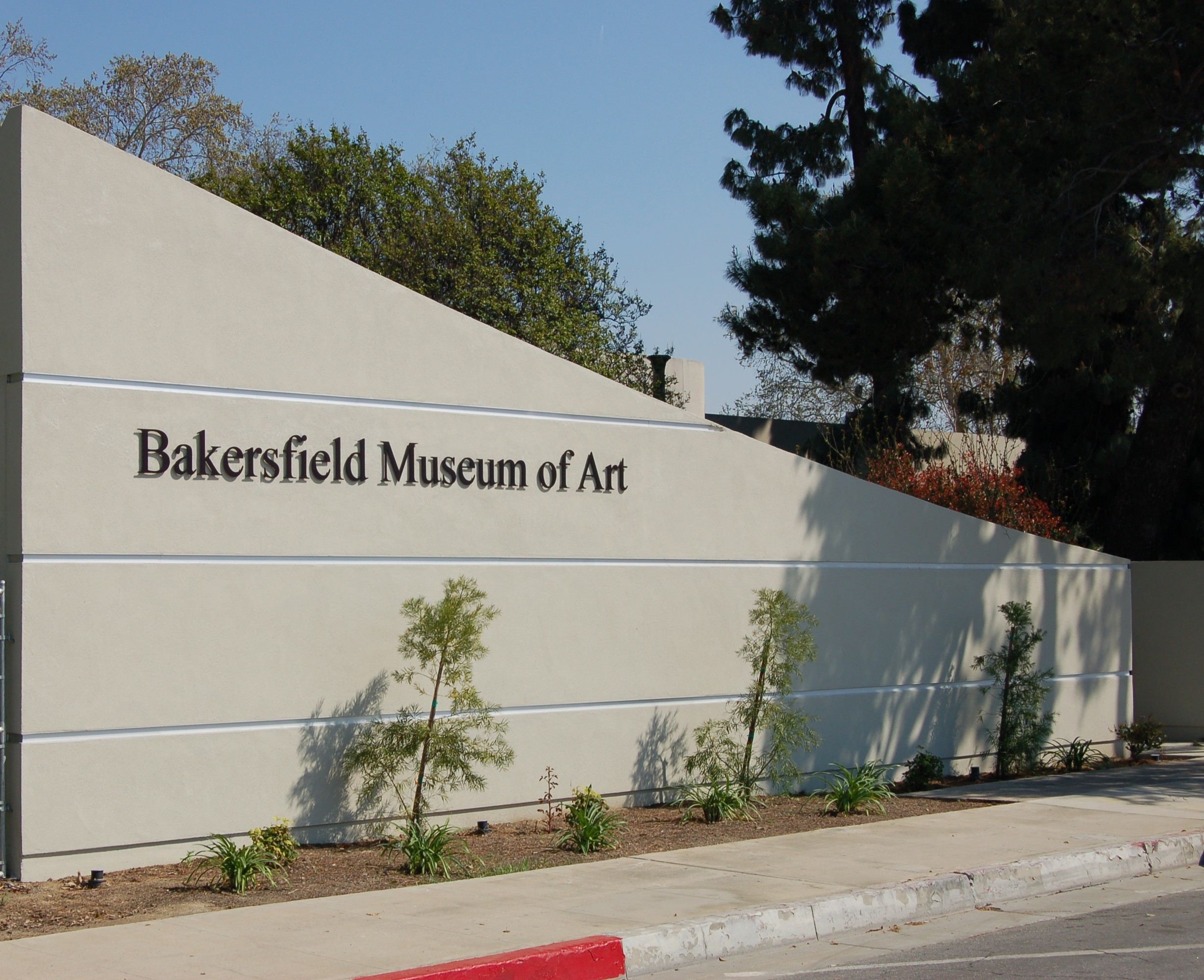
- Entrance sign on R Street
- Former name: Cunningham Art Gallery
- Established: 1954
- Location: Bakersfield, California
- Coordinates: 35.377°N 119.009°W
- Type: Art museum
- Director: Amy Smith
- Public transit access: GET Rt. 8 (Foothill)
- Website: www.bmoa.org

The Bakersfield Museum of Art is an art museum, in Bakersfield, California. It is located in Central Park, on the corner of 19th St. and R St. It has four galleries, which contains a permanent collection mainly from regional artists, as well as room for traveling art exhibits. In 2019, it was accredited by the American Alliance of Museums.

== History ==
The museum was founded in 1956 by the Walter Osborn family. The museum was originally named the Cunningham Art Gallery, in memory of their daughter, Marion Osborn Cunningham (1911–1948). Their donation, combined with others, allowed the museum to be constructed in Central Park on the southeast side of downtown.

When the museum was completed, it was turned over to the city for maintenance. It was operated by volunteers of the Bakersfield Art Association, and the city appointed Art Commission. Primarily the museum would showcase the work of local artists and occasionally a traveling art show. It would also be surrounded by gardens, which would showcase sculptures and other art forms.

In 1990, the museum was transferred from the city to the Bakersfield Art Foundation, an independent governing agency. At that time, the name was changed to the Bakersfield Museum of Art. Since then, the museum has seen many changes. In 1991, one year after the transfer, the museum was accredited by the American Alliance of Museums. In 1997, with major endowments from Patricia Crail Brown Foundation and the late Dr. George and Millie Ablin, the museum started a campaign to expand. In June of the same year, the foundation purchased the land the museum occupied from the city. Work then started on expanding the facility. By 2001, construction on the 17,400 square feet (1,620 m^{2}) structure was completed.

== Description ==
The Bakersfield Museum of Art is 17,400 square feet (1,620 m^{2}). It contains two large galleries and two smaller galleries. It also has two classrooms and a banquet hall. Outside, the museum has several gardens which display various sculptures and other art forms. The museum’s permanent collection is primarily from regional artists.

The museum's mission is to: "[provide] a broad spectrum of visual arts experiences through the exhibition and preservation of fine art, educational programs, community outreach, and special events."
