= Bakersfield City School District =

School district in California, United States

Location
- Bakersfield, California United States

District information
- Type: Public school district
- Motto: Where The Child Comes First
- Grades: PreK - 8
- Established: 1870
- Superintendent: Dr. Karling Aguilera-Fort
- Schools: 45
- Budget: $588 million (2023-2024)

Students and staff
- Students: 28,761 (2023-2024)
- Teachers: 1,403.76 (on FTE basis)
- Staff: 3,617.64 (on FTE basis)
- Student–teacher ratio: 20.49

Other information
- Schedule: Nine-month

Bakersfield City School District (BCSD) is a Pre-Kindergarten - 8th grade public school district in Bakersfield, California. The district has 45 schools, and serves about 30,000 students in much of the city of Bakersfield.

The Bakersfield City School District (BCSD) recognizes past students and board members yearly through the Hall of Fame recognition and award ceremony. Former BCSD member Bill McDougle distinguished himself in his profession as a former student, BCSD teacher, and by serving the district for 6 years as a board member.[ https://bakersfieldnow.com/news/local/bcsd-announces-2018-hall-of-fame-inductees] and was inducted into the BCSD Hall of Fame in 2018.
