= Arts and culture of Bakersfield, California =

Bakersfield provides a wide variety of arts and culture.

== Film and television ==
Bakersfield and surrounding Kern County have long been used as a major "on-site" filming location. Starting with Opportunity and a Million Acres, in 1913, hundreds of movies, and countless television shows and commercials, have been at least partly filmed in the county. The lure to the area is the diverse landscape. These include: agricultural land, flat valley, rolling hills, steep mountains, deserts, and rural communities. Some tourists visit the area to see where their favorite movies were made.

Although Bakersfield (and the surrounding area) has long been a draw for movie filming, the city has often been portrayed humorously or negatively in motion pictures. Some think the trend started with Johnny Carson while he hosted The Tonight Show. Some examples include the failed TV series Bakersfield PD (1993), which aired on Fox and Baskets (2016), a series about a rodeo clown and his relationships with his fellow Bakersfield natives. Bakersfield is also mentioned in The Running Man (1987 film) as massacre in Bakersfield with Arnold Schwarzenegger.

== Music ==
Bakersfield has its share of notable "native-born" musicians, including Country Music Hall of Famer Merle Haggard, renowned jazz pianist David Benoit, Hall of Fame guitarist Bill Aken (one of the founding members of 'The Wrecking Crew' inducted into the Musician's Hall of Fame in 2008), country music artist Buck Owens, American Latin jazz musician Louie Cruz Beltran, and sacred music composer and performer Gloria Roe.

=== Country ===
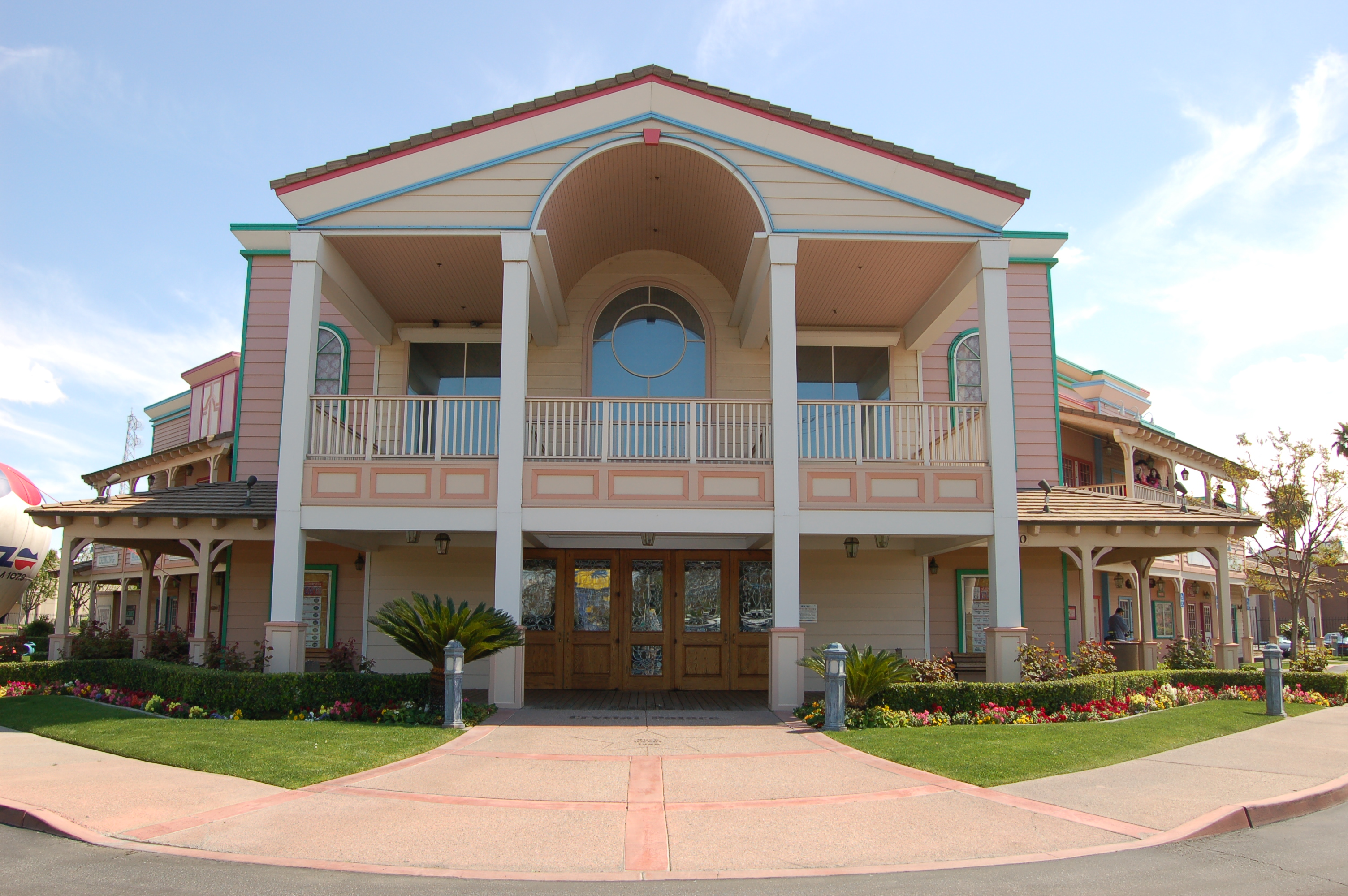
Buck Owens Crystal Palace has rapidly become the symbol of Bakersfield's country music heritage.

In the 1950s and 1960s, local musicians such as Bill Woods, Tommy Collins, Buck Owens, Merle Haggard, and Wynn Stewart developed a streamlined country music style called the Bakersfield sound, which emphasized pedal steel guitar, the Fender Telecaster electric guitar and intense vocals. Bakersfield country was considered a spinoff of the honky-tonk style of country music that emerged from Texas, appropriate since many musicians there hailed from either Texas or surrounding states. The Buck Owens Crystal Palace is a respected concert venue, regularly featuring new recording artists as well as established country music stars. Buddy Alan (Buck's eldest son) performs with The Buckaroos (Doyle Curtsinger, Jim Shaw, Terry Christoffersen and David Wulfekuehler) regularly. Country music artist Gary Allan bases his music on the Bakersfield sound.

=== Rock ===
In 1972, Bob Weir released the song "Mexicali Blues" on his first solo album, Ace. Not only does the sound of the song pay tribute to the Bakersfield sound, the name of the city is referenced in the lyrics.

In 1978, The Rolling Stones released the song "Far Away Eyes" on the album Some Girls. Mick Jagger and Keith Richards collaborated extensively on writing the song and it was recorded in late 1977. The Rolling Stones, longtime country music fans, incorporated many aspects of "Bakersfield sound" country music into this song. Bakersfield is mentioned in the first line of the song.

In the early 1990s, a group of friends from the lower and middle-class parts of Northeast and East Bakersfield formed the band Korn. The members of the band attended Highland High School (Jonathan Davis and Reginald "Fieldy" Arvizu), East High School (James "Munky" Shaffer and former lead guitarist Brian "Head" Welch) and South High School (David Silveria). The band has gone on to write nine full-length albums (with a 10th in production). They have also achieved multi-platinum success and won two Grammys.

=== Venues ===
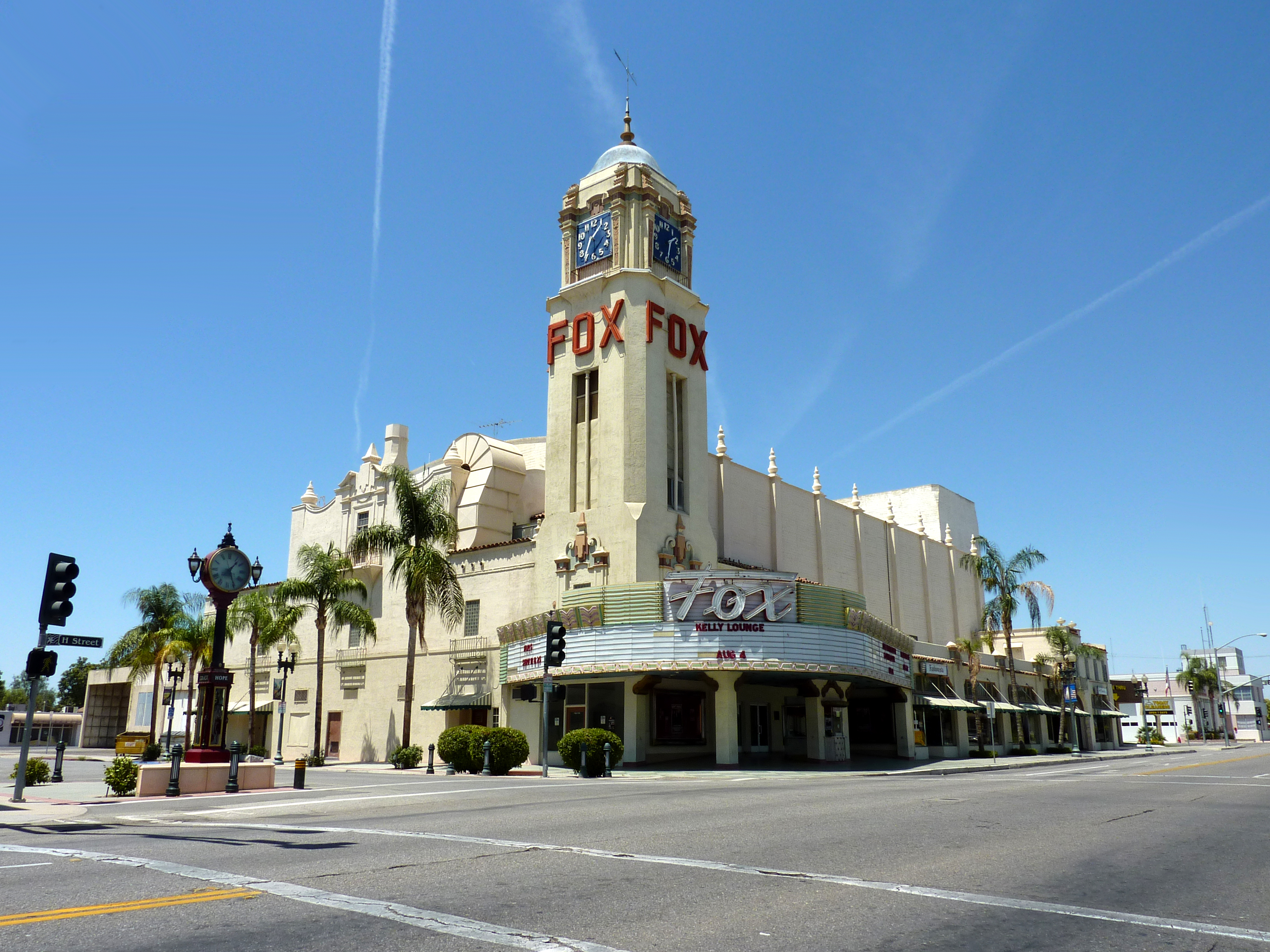
The Fox Theater is one of many performance venues in Bakersfield.

Music is performed in a variety of locations throughout the city. The Buck Owens Crystal Palace, which symbolizes Bakersfield's country western music heritage, is a venue for that type of music. Other major theater locations include Rabobank Theater, Rabobank Arena, and the Fox Theater. There are also a variety of outdoor amphitheaters. They include: Brighthouse Amphitheater at The Park at River Walk, Outdoor Theater at Bakersfield College and Amphitheater at Cal State Bakersfield. There are additional outdoor amphitheaters (although much smaller) at Beale Park, Jastro Park, and Jefferson Park. In addition, several bars and restaurants also have space for musicians. The largest is the Nile Bar and Grill, which occupies the former Nile Theater in the Arts District, downtown.

In addition to these venues, two others were proposed but were never built. For years, the Bakersfield Symphony has wanted a "home theater" to perform their music. Currently, they share the Rabobank Theater. It has been suggest that the complex be a performing arts center, with multiple theaters of varying sizes similar to the Lincoln Center in New York City or the Music Center in Los Angeles. However, the proposal has never evolved beyond the conceptual phase. Hart Park in Northeast Bakersfield was the site for a proposed 20,000-seat amphitheater, referred to as the Kern County Bowl. The theater was proposed during the Great Depression, and would have used WPA funds for construction. However, the start of World War II in 1939 removed the funding source and the project was shelved.

== Art ==
=== Visual art ===
The region surrounding Bakersfield has historically been used as subjects in artwork. The lure is the variety of terrain in a relatively small area. It includes: flat land, rolling hills, steep mountains, and deserts (the same draw for the motion picture industry). Within the city, there are also a variety of scenes. Most people, however, choice one of the recognizable local landmarks for subjects. They include: Beale Memorial Clock Tower, Bakersfield Sign, Mill Creek covered bridge, Buck Owens Crystal Palace, and the Fox Theater.

The Arts District in downtown has become the center of Bakersfield's arts scene. It is also downtown's largest district. Dozens of art galleries and art related stores are located in the district; most centered around the intersection of 19th St. and Eye St. The district is also filled with public sculptures and murals. Also, most of the traffic light utility boxes have been painted, each with a unique design. In addition, the Bakersfield Museum of Art is located in neighboring Mill Creek, which is the city's only art museum.

=== Performing arts ===
Bakersfield is one of the more active communities in the San Joaquin Valley for the performing arts. Currently, there are six local theatre venues, each offering a different type of theater experience. The Bakersfield Music Theatre, also known as Stars Theatre, performs musical theatre productions at Harvey Auditorium. Stars Theatre is a dinner theatre which performs a variety of stage productions (although their theater does not have a scenery loft) in the Arts District, downtown. They also have a venue that do plays called Stars Playhouse. The Ovation Theatre performs small, intimate productions, also located in the Arts District, downtown. Typically, only a few actors are used and no sets, except for possibly a table, chair, etc. The Empty Space Theatre performs shows performed by local actors, producers, directors and stagehands. They used to do shows for free with people donating after the show is done, but they went to a more traditional payment structure. They still keep a minimum of ten seats available on donation to remember their past. Bakersfield Community Theatre is the longest continually running community theatre in California. It also has the only free summer youth theatre program in Bakersfield. Gaslight Melodrama performs melodramatic locally produced productions which typically require audience participation. Their theatre is located in Rosedale, Northwest Bakersfield.

In addition, Bakersfield hosts traveling productions. Most are performed at the Rabobank Theater in the Civic Center, downtown, or the Fox Theater in the Arts District, downtown. Sometimes (although rarely), traveling productions are also held at Harvey Auditorium.

== Museums ==
There are currently four museums based in Bakersfield. The oldest and largest is the Kern County Museum. Its purpose is the history of the county, and contains over 1,000,000 artifacts and 50 historic buildings moved there from around the county. The Bakersfield Museum of Art is an art museum located in Mill Creek, downtown. It hosts traveling shows, as well as a permanent collection of artwork. There is also an outdoor sculpture garden on the premise. The Buena Vista Museum of Natural History is a natural history museum located in the Arts District, downtown. Primarily it focuses on local geology, paleontology, and archeology, although there are some artifacts from other parts of the world. The Bakersfield Country Music Museum focuses on the history of country western music in Bakersfield. The smallest museum of the four, it is currently housed in a portion of the Kern County Museum.

In addition, there is a zoo and living museum called the California Living Museum (CALM). It is located in the Kern River County Park in Northeast Bakersfield. Its primary focus are local plants and animals.

== Architecture ==
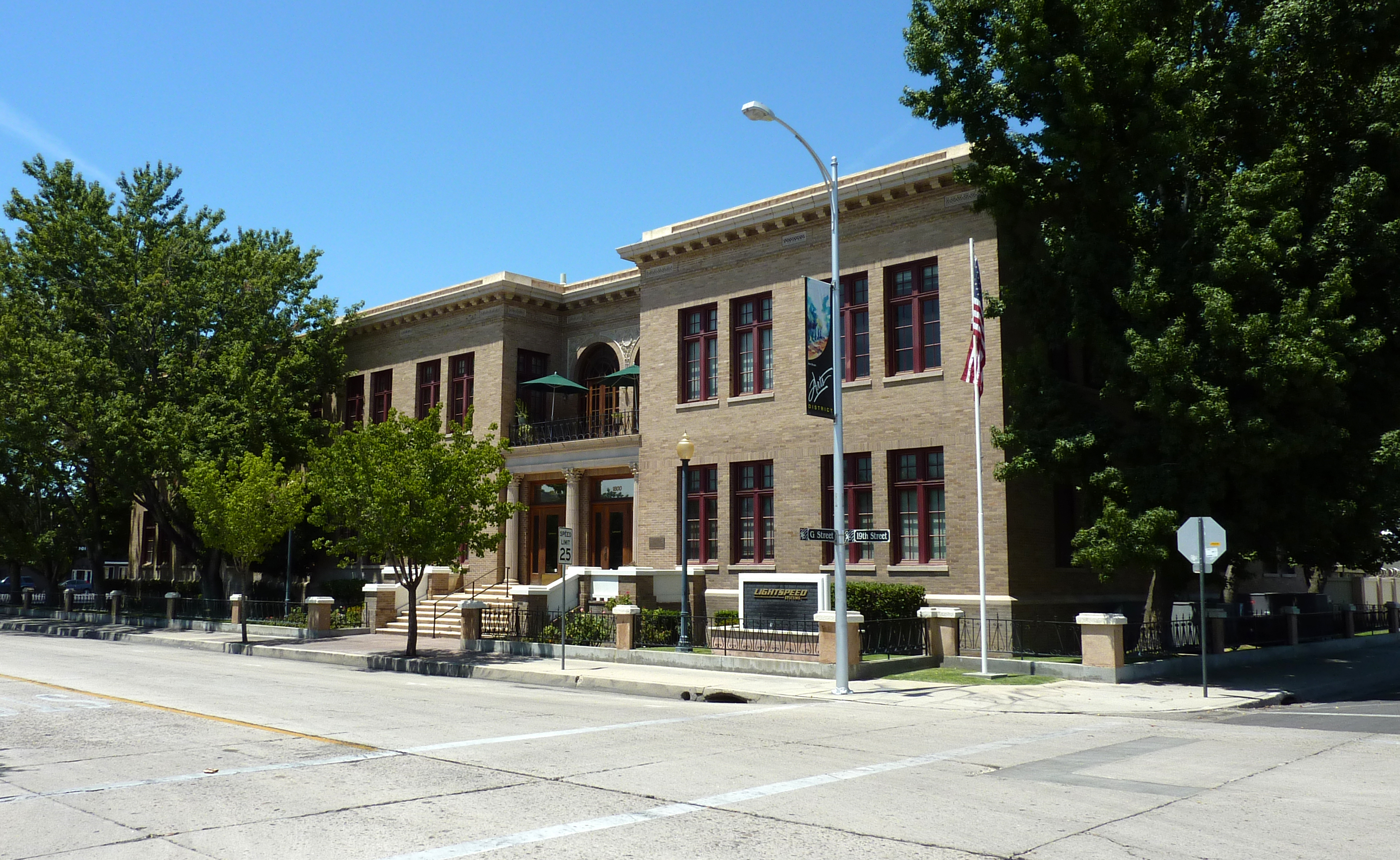
Jastro Building is one of many buildings in Bakersfield designed in the Second Renaissance Revival style.

Most of Bakersfield's historic architecture are centered in Central and East Bakersfield, which are also the oldest sections of the city. In the commercial areas, popular styles include: Second Renaissance, Mission, Art Deco, and Spanish Revival. Historically, government buildings were constructed in the Beaux-arts style, but most were destroyed in the 1952 earthquake, or heavily remolded in the mid 20th Century. More recently, modern architecture has become more popular, with an emphasis on water features.

== Cuisine ==
Bakersfield is home to the Dewars Chew. In addition, the city has a wide variety of restaurants of different types. The region's large Basque population has resulted in one of the few areas of California to have Basque restaurants. Other ethnic populations have resulted in a large collection of Mexican, and Asian restaurants (including Chinese, Japanese, and Korean).
