= Sports in Bakersfield, California =

Sports in Bakersfield

Minor League
- Number of teams: 3
- Number of venues: 3
- Number of championships: 3
- First team: Badgers (1941)

University
- University: California State University, Bakersfield
- Division: Division I
- Conference: Independent

College
- College: Bakersfield College
- Athletic association: CCCAA
- Conference: Western State Conference

Other
- Other venues: Bakersfield Ice Sports Center; Bakersfield Sports Village

Bakersfield is home to several minor league sports franchises and collegiate athletic programs at Bakersfield College and California State University, Bakersfield.

Bakersfield is also the center for racing sports held in the region. They include drag strip, jet boat, dirt track and paved. Most are held at tracks located about 20 miles outside of the city.

== Professional Sports ==
Club	League	Venue	Established	Championships
Bakersfield Condors	AHL, Ice hockey	Dignity Health Arena	2015	0
Bakersfield Train Robbers	PL, Baseball	Sam Lynn Ballpark	2017	1 (2018)
Bakersfield Majestics	USBL, Basketball	Bakersfield College	2022	0

=== Baseball ===
The Bakersfield Train Robbers play in the Pecos League. The baseball team plays at Sam Lynn Ballpark, one of a few active professional baseball fields that face west.

=== Hockey ===
The Bakersfield Condors play in the American Hockey League after a major realignment prior to the 2015–16 season. Originally, the Bakersfield Condors played in the WCHL from 1995 to 2003 and then the ECHL from 2003 to 2015. Formerly known as the Oilers and Fog, they used to play in the Civic Auditorium and Convention Center (later renamed Rabobank Theater and convention center). They moved to the Centennial Garden (later renamed Rabobank Arena) after it opened in 1998.

=== Basketball ===
The Bakersfield Magic currently play in the United States Basketball League after previously having joined The Basketball League as an expansion team in 2022. The Magic play at Bakersfield College. Previously, Bakersfield was home to the Bakersfield Jam of the NBA G League.

== College ==
Bakersfield currently has two colleges, both with large sports programs. Bakersfield College is a community college, which is a part of the Western State Conference. Its most recognized sport is football, played at the 20,000-seat Memorial Stadium. The football program has four national championships. In addition, Bakersfield College competes in 18 men's and women's sports, including basketball, swimming, tennis, track & field, and wrestling.

California State University, Bakersfield (CSUB) is a four-year university, which is an NCAA division I school, and whose athletic teams are known as the Roadrunners. Its most recognized sport is men's basketball, which is played at Rabobank Arena. The basketball program has three national championships (all when the school was in division II). In addition, CSUB competes in 17 men's and women's sports, including baseball, soccer, swimming and diving, and water polo.

== Racing ==
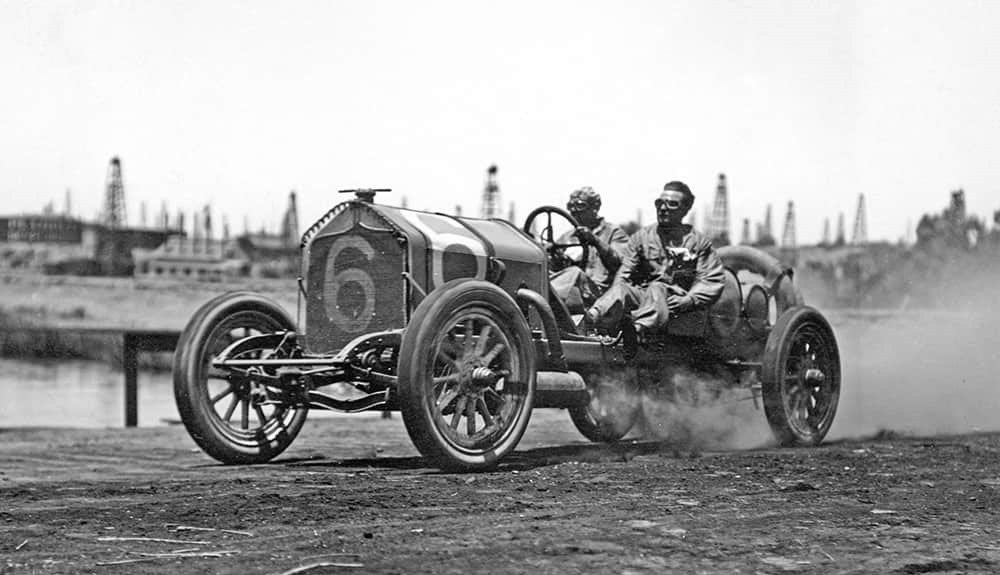
Harvey Herrick racing a National in Bakersfield during the 1911 Tevis Cup

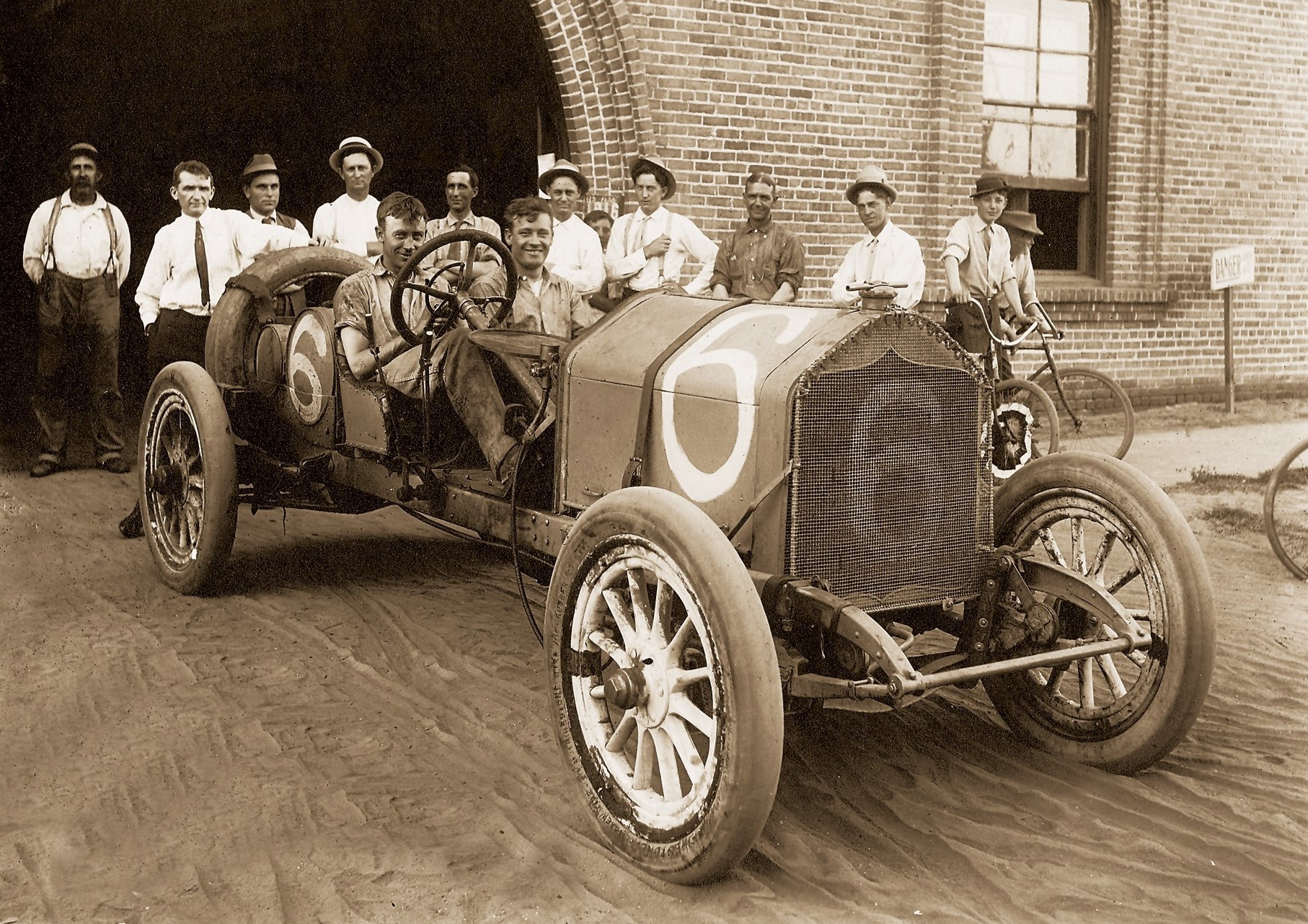
Herrick (left) and his mechanician after winning the Tevis Cup

Bakersfield is the home of several motor sports venues. During the formative period of American auto racing, Bakersfield, in 1911, hosted an American Automobile Association (AAA) Indy car event. The race took place around the local oil derricks, and was won by Harvey Herrick. The Bakersfield Speedway is a 1/3-mile (500m) banked clay oval track. It hosts weekly Saturday-night racing, most notably the World of Outlaws. The Bakersfield Speedway hosts the United States Auto Club (USAC) National Midget Tour and it began holding series finale in 2017. The track held USAC National Midget races in 1959, 1966-67, 1974, 1988-1995. 1997-2000, and 2017 to present.

After the destruction of the Mesa Marin Raceway, a new track, formerly known as Kern County's New Home to NASCAR, and now known as the Kern County Raceway Park, opened in 2013. The track is located west of Bakersfield on what was an almond orchard at the Interstate 5/Highway 43 (Enos Lane) interchange. It was approved for construction by the Kern County Board of Supervisors in December 2006 and was originally planned to open for the 2008 racing season, but was delayed because of a lack of funding.

Famoso Raceway is a drag racing track north of Bakersfield. Each Spring, they host an event called the March Meet. The initial March Meet was started by the car club The Bakersfield Smokers, in 1959, and included the legendary Swamp Rat machine driven by "Big Daddy" Don Garlits. This event, which originally gave legitimacy to the NHRA, is now a nostalgic drag racing event held every March and operated by the track. In the fall of each year, Auto Club Famoso Raceway also hosts the California Hot Rod Reunion, a gathering of street rodders, drag racers and auto enthusiasts.

Buttonwillow Raceway Park is 38 miles northwest of Bakersfield and hosts road racing events year round. The track is owned by the California Sports Car Club, it has been featured in automotive magazines as a test track, as well as being a regular location for the Redline Time Attack series.

The national jet boat association holds races at Lake Ming, in Northeast Bakersfield. During racing season, qualifying rounds, and elimination rounds are held on Saturday. Finals are held on Sunday.

== Former franchises ==
Club	League	Venue	Years in Bakersfield	Championships
Bakersfield Blitz	Af2, Arena football	Rabobank Arena	2004–2007	0
Bakersfield Brigade	PDL, Soccer	Bakersfield Christian High School	2005–2009	0
Bakersfield Jam	NBA Development League, Basketball	Rabobank Arena; Dignity Health Event Center	2006–2016	0
Bakersfield Blaze	MLB, Minor League Baseball	Sam Lynn Ballpark	19 – 2016	2

== Notable events ==
Bakersfield hosts state, national and international sporting events. Several have been broadcast around the nation and world. Some of the more notable events include:

- Stage 5 finish for the 2010 Amgen Tour of California.
- Host for the 2011 ECHL all-star hockey game.
- CIF State Wrestling Championships (high school), 2004–present
- CIF State Basketball Championships (high school), 2010
- USA-BMX Fall Nationals, 2017

== Sports Venues ==
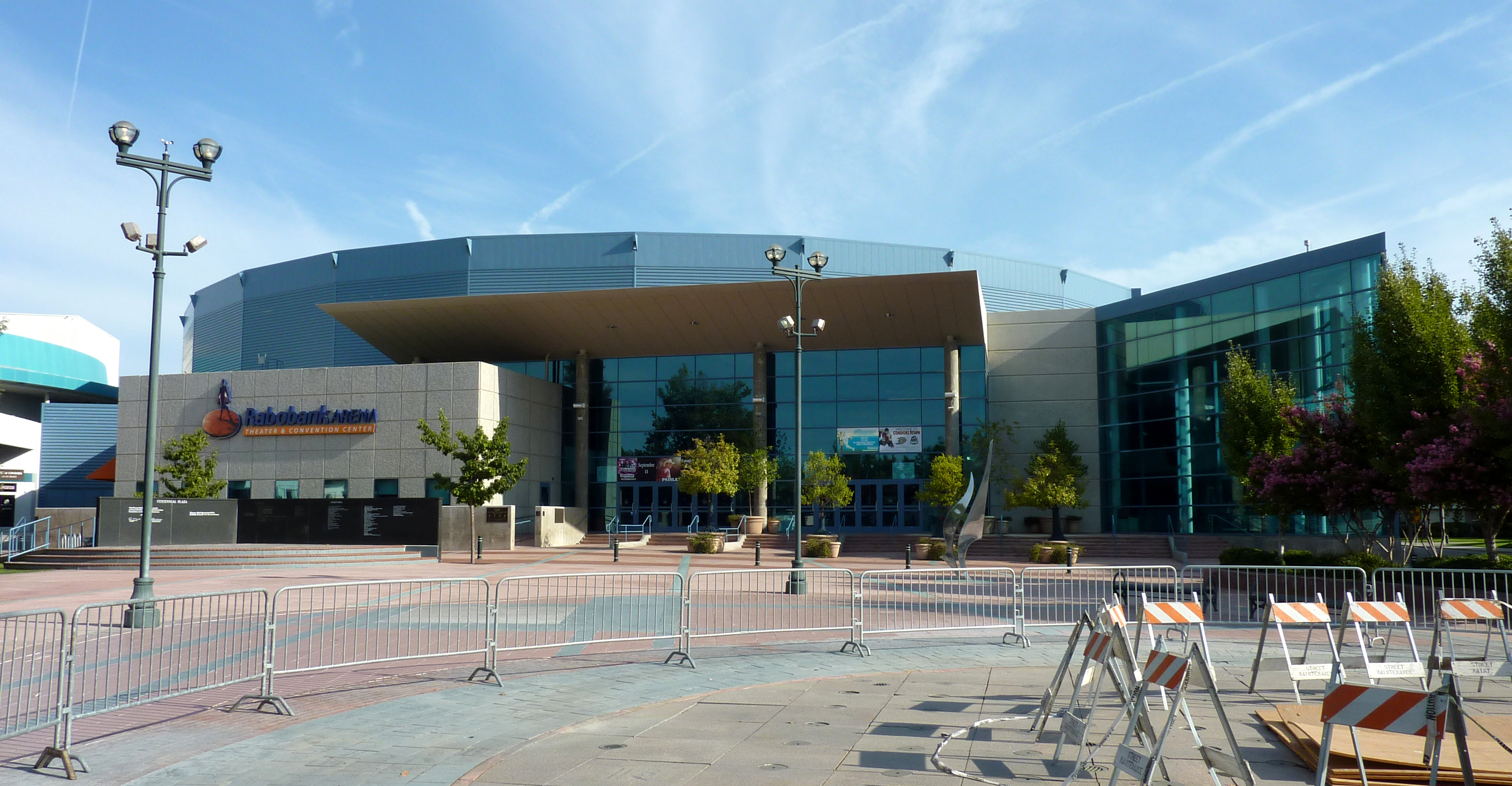
Dignity Health Arena

The city's major civic center, the Dignity Health Arena (formerly known as Centennial Garden, Rabobank Arena, and Mechanics Bank Arena) in downtown Bakersfield, is the home of the Bakersfield Condors, an American Hockey League team. The club is owned by the NHL's Edmonton Oilers. In addition, the arena hosts basketball teams of CSU Bakersfield, the California State High School Wrestling Championships, sporting, and entertainment conventions. The Bakersfield Blitz; a former af2 team, also played at Rabobank Arena. The arena was the former home of the Bakersfield Jam of the NBA Developmental League. The Jam play in a small facility, the Dignity Health Events Center on Roberts Lane in Oildale next to Meadows Field Airport, converted to host games as a cost-saving measure in 2009-10.

Historic Sam Lynn Ballpark plays host to the city's minor league baseball team, the Blaze, along with local high school baseball tournaments, is located in the northern downtown area. Built in 1941, it is the oldest stadium in the California League and is the only remaining professional baseball stadium in the United States that faces west.

Other arenas include the McMurtrey Aquatic Center, which includes an Olympic-sized swimming pool that hosts high-school events, a recreational pool with two waterslides, a smaller "child safe" pool, lockers, showers, and much more. The Ice Sports center hosts youth hockey. The Kern County Soccer Park is the largest soccer facility in California.

Bakersfield has been a stop for the Ben Hogan Tour and Nike Tour. It also hosts PGA Tour qualifying events and NCAA Division II regionals and tournaments. Courses include the private Seven Oaks Country Club, Kern River Golf Course, the Bakersfield Country Club, the Rio Bravo Country Club and the Links at RiverLakes Ranch.

The Dome, a small building formerly known as Strelich Stadium (AKA Strongbow Stadium), hosted a number of different events including concerts, boxing, kickboxing, and professional wrestling over the years since its 1940 opening. It was demolished in October 2018.
