= Hart Memorial Park =

Public park in Kern County, California, US

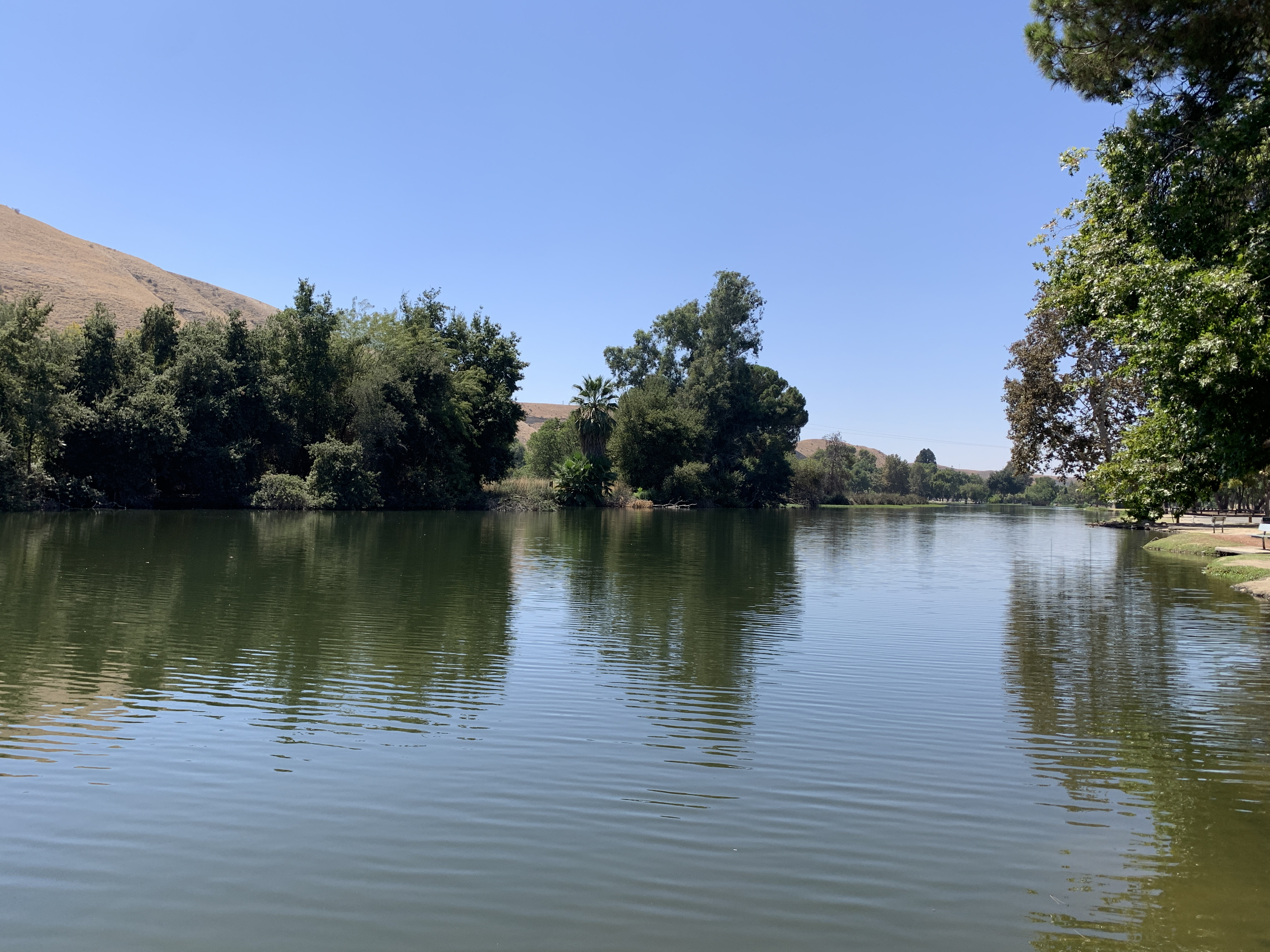
- Lake at Hart Memorial Park

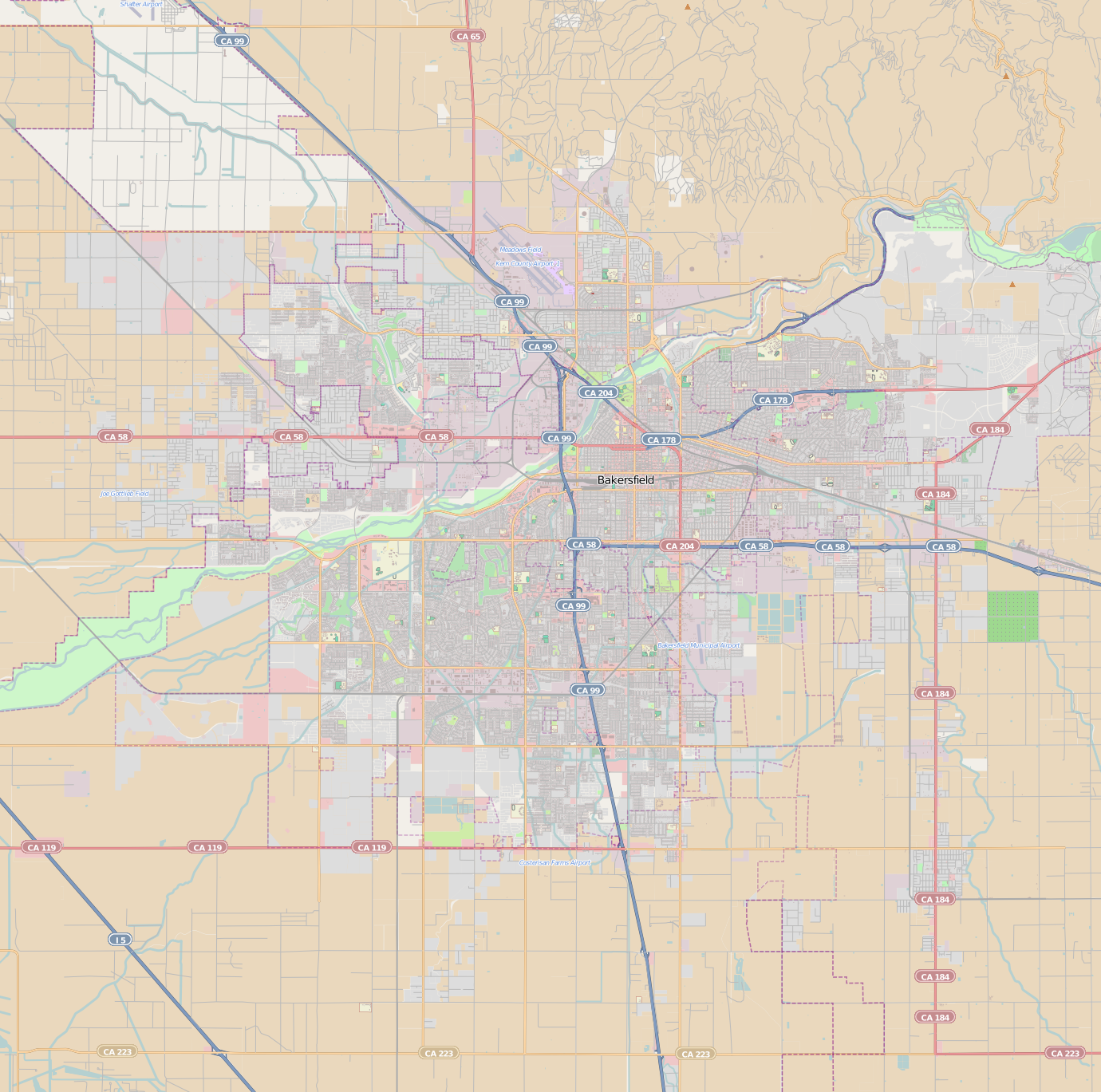
- Location within Bakersfield, California Location within California
- Type: Public Park
- Location: Bakersfield, California
- Coordinates: 35°26′56″N 118°54′39″W
- Area: 370 acres (150 ha)
- Created: 1921
- Operator: Kern County Department of Parks and Recreation
- Status: Open all year

Hart Memorial Park (commonly called Hart Park) is a large public park in Kern County, California. It is located just north of Bakersfield (specifically the Northeast region). The park is 370 acres (150 ha), and contains two lakes and three canals. It was named after County Supervisor John Hart, who spearheaded the project. Constructed between 1921 and 1936, it is the oldest section of the Kern River County Park.

== History ==
=== Construction ===
The origins of the park date back to 1921, when County Supervisor John Hart convinced the county to purchase land along the Kern River east of Gordon's Ferry. The goal was to create a large recreational park, which residents could use to escape the summer heat. Landscape architect Howard Gilkey, from Oakland, California, was hired to create the general plan for the park. Famous for designing water features, Gilkey made extensive use of the adjacent Kern River. Several canals and lakes were designed.

Construction began shortly after the property was acquired. Development proceeded slowly, since the county did not appropriate funds. Instead, Hart relied largely on private donations for materials and volunteer labor. Almost every non-profit service club would participate in the effort. Several sponsored a grove of trees, providing landscaping and irrigation. These groves were originally marked with plaques recognizing these organizations, however, years of vandalism have destroyed many of them.

Although the park was laid out according to Gilkey's master plan, most of the construction work was done without formal engineering plans. Streets, lakes, canals, and buildings were instead constructed "by ear." Several buildings from other parts of Bakersfield were also moved to the park. Because of the limited funding, one of the primary building materials used was river rocks from the Kern River Canyon (which were free). They were used in the construction of fire rings, barbecues, drinking fountains, and the double-decker bandstand (with drinking fountains on the lower level).

=== Continued development and official opening ===
By May 5, 1929, construction of the park progressed enough that it was opened to the public. Although more work was needed before completion, it was decided to show off to the residents of Kern County the work that was accomplished. The park was named "Kern River Park." That year, Hart and others considered establishing a museum in the park, which would showcase historical items that were collected by the local Lions Club. The Kern County Museum was finally established in 1941 to hold the collection; however, it would be located on U.S. Route 99 (Chester Avenue) in Bakersfield.

The Great Depression that started in 1929 would slow donations for the park's construction. However, WPA (Works Progress Administration) funds would make up most of the difference. Kern River Park was completed on May 17, 1936. A formal ceremony was held that included speeches, races, dances, music, games, and other activities. The park contained three lakes: one for birds and other water fowl, one for rowing and paddle wheel boats, and one for swimming. In addition, there was a 2-acre swimming pool. Natural hot springs were used for a bath house. An amusement park was located on the east end of the park, which included a train and carousel. Concession booths were located at the boat lake and the amusement park. A zoo was located throughout the park.

=== Growth and additions ===
When traveling through the Kern River Canyon, Hart discovered an unusually shaped rock. He commented that it would make a nice addition to the Kern River Park. After his death in 1934, that rock was moved to the park and placed at the entrance to the parking lot for the swimming pool. Jack Shields Trucking donated equipment and labor for the relocation and the East Bakersfield Progressive Club, with volunteer labor, would mount it with a plaque dedicated to John Hart. It was formally dedicated on Labor Day, September 6, 1937, with a public gala to honor Hart and his efforts in the creation of the park. Ten years later, on June 15, 1947, the Kern River Park was renamed Hart Memorial Park.

During the late 1940s and early 1950s, additional land was purchased east of Hart Park. This would quadruple the size from 370 to 1,012 acres (150 to 410 ha) (although the new land was not then considered part of Hart Park). Called the Kern River County Park, the land would contain a motorboat lake, golf course, and campgrounds. To meet the growing demand, Alfred Harrell Highway, the road used to access the park, was upgraded to a four-lane freeway. It was also extended as a two-lane conventional highway east to SR 178 (Kern Canyon Road) with land reserved for future interchanges.

=== Decline ===
The park began to decline in the late 1960s and early 1970s. The exact reason for the decline is unknown although several possibilities have been proposed. Some believe the shift in development to the southwest led to the decline, others believe that growing entertainment options in the city resulted in less time spent in the park.

The 1952 Kern County earthquake would eliminate the natural hot spring. Later, the zoo would close, as well as the swimming lake (water was supplied by the water wheel which was also falling into disrepair). The amusement park would close and Sniders would end their bicycle rental business. The concrete pool and the boat rentals would also close.

Some of these facilities would later return in locations outside of Hart Park. The California Living Museum was established east of Hart Park and would contain a zoo. The McMurtrey Aquatic Center would replace the concrete pool, which is located in Mill Creek, Downtown Bakersfield.

== Amenities ==
Hart Park is 370 acres (150 ha), which makes it one of the larger parks in Bakersfield. It has two lakes and three canals. There are several "sections" which can be rented for large gatherings. There are also several large fields for lawn sports, and baseball backstops. There is one large reservable picnic area (one of two in Kern River Park). It contains: a band stand, two deep pit barbecues, two grills with 7 propane burners, food preparation tables, two booths (one for tickets and the other for drinks). The area is lit, but is not fenced.

There is also an equestrian trail on the north side of Hart Park. A bike path starts on the east side, and travels through the Kern River County Park, ending at the Kern River Golf Course. There are also two 18-hole disk golf courses.

Many of the roads in the park are named after nearby geographic features. For example, River Road is near the Kern River, and Lake Street is near the boating lake. Some of the facilities for which roads are named no longer exist. For example, Harbor Road originally led to the harbor on the boating lake and Kiddieland Drive was next to the amusement park.

== Tree grove sponsors ==
The following is a list of organizations which developed the various tree groves throughout the park. Each grove was originally marked with a bronze plaque, although most have been destroyed because of vandalism.

- Farm Bureau
- G.A.R.
- Masons
- Elks
- Moose
- Security Benefit Association
- Eagles
- Santa Fe RR Firemen
- Druids
- USWV
- Kof P
- Degree Of Honor
- WCTU
- IOOF
- Lions
- Women's Club
- WOW
- Union Labor Council
- Building Trades Council
- Realty Board
- American Legion
- Native Daughters of the Golden West
- VFW
- Water Service Club
- Bakersfield Chapter DAR
- Native Sons of the Golden West
- Red Men
- Pocahontas
- North Of The River Club
- KC Community Club
- Japanese Club
- BPWC
- Kern Archers Club
- 20-30 Club
- Soroptimists

== Unconstructed additions ==
Two facilities were planned but never constructed.

=== Dante Cascade Waterfall ===
On the east side, ending near Hill Street, was the Dante Cascade Waterfall, to honor Dante Alighieri. The project was originally proposed by the Societa di Mutuo Soccorso of Kern County Italians. The waterfall would begin at the tallest peak next to the park. It would cascade down three levels, to symbolizes his work, The Divine Comedy. The waterfall would have also featured a bust of Dante at its base.

The group started raising funds for the project in 1931. However, the great depression would greatly impact the organization's ability to raise funds. Only partial grading, which can be seen at the top of Hill Street, was completed.

=== Kern River Bowl ===
On the northwest corner of the park was a proposed outdoor amphitheater named the Kern County Bowl (or Kern River Bowl). Scheduled for construction in 1939, it was originally proposed by the Kern County Employees Association and quickly supported by every civic and non-profit service group in the county. The design for the theater was based on similar outdoor theater of the time such as the Hollywood Bowl. It would contain a shell, seating built into the hill side in a gentle arc, and a rustic pool/fountain separating the two. It would have been very large, with an estimated seating capacity for 20,000 people. During the 1940 census, Bakersfield had a population of 30,000 and Kern County had a population of 135,000.

The project would have been constructed with WPA funds. It was submitted for the 1939/1940 fiscal year. However, because of the start of World War II, priority was given to facilities which could be used by the military such as roads and airports. Private funds were never raised and the project was indefinitely shelved. Grading for the seating was completed. The site is now occupied by the Kern County Sheriffs Shooting Range.
