= Jastro Park =

Park in Bakersfield, California, United States

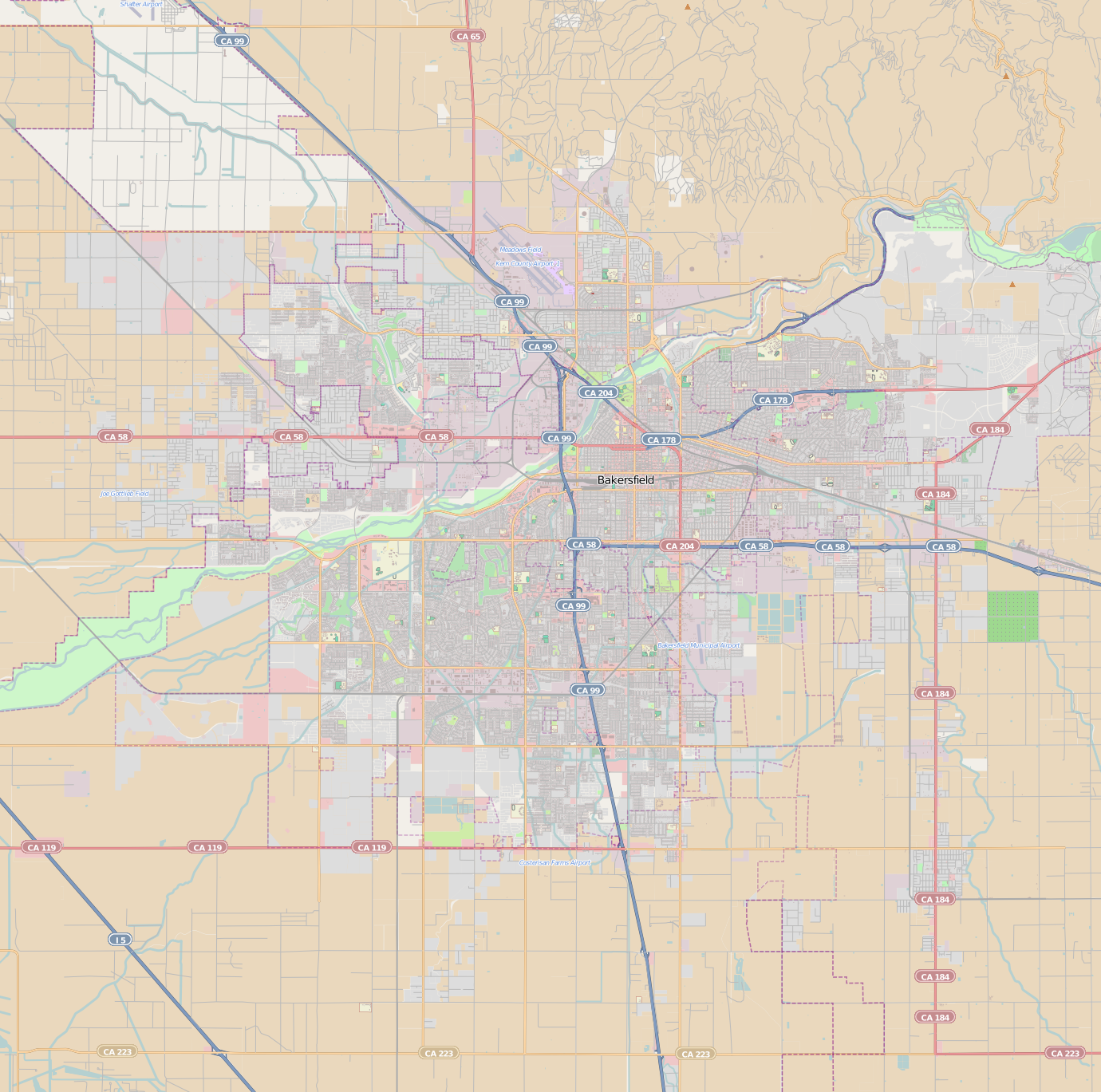
- Location within Bakersfield, California Location within California
- Type: Public Park
- Location: Bakersfield, California
- Coordinates: 35°22′30″N 119°02′07″W
- Area: 9 acres (36,000 m^{2})
- Created: 1917
- Operator: Bakersfield Department of Recreation and Parks
- Status: Open all year

Jastro Park is a public park located in Bakersfield, California. It was constructed on two square blocks of land at the corner of Truxtun Ave. and Elm St, in Westchester.

== History ==
The park was created in 1917, on two square blocks of land donated by the Kern County Land Company. Most of the landscaping was initially donated by Henry A. Jastro in 1925, for whom the park is named. A plaque in the park marks this contribution. In 1927, Jastro also donated an outdoor amphitheater, designed by Charles H. Biggar. The Jastro Park amphitheater is one of three open amphitheaters in Bakersfield — the other two are at Beale Park in Central Bakersfield and Jefferson Park in East Bakersfield — and the only one not to have built in seating for the audience.

Since 1927, the park has seen many improvements. Two reservable picnic areas and several other individual picnic areas have been added. A pool was constructed, which was used by the Bakersfield High School swim team, as well as several outdoor sports courts.

In 2004, an aquatics center was constructed in downtown Bakersfield. Around the same time, many local pools in public parks, including Jasto Park, were in need of refurbishment. The city decided to remove the pool at Jastro Park instead of refurbish it. The pool was removed and replaced with a spray park.

== Amenities ==
Jastro Park is one of the most well equipped parks in Bakersfield. It has two reservable picnic areas. One seats 128 people, and is equipped with lights, two barbecues, and a covered serving table. The other seats 80 people, and is also equipped with lights, two barbecues, and an uncovered serving table. There are several other individual picnic areas, which seat 8 or 16 people, each equipped with one barbecue. There is one lit basketball court, six lit tennis courts (each with a seat for an umpire), and two lit horseshoe pits. There is also a set of poles for a volleyball net and open grass suitable for most lawn sports. The park includes restrooms, a playground, and a spray park.

The park is equipped with an open, outdoor amphitheater equipped with a stage and seating. The large, flat space is also perfect for dancing.
