= Buena Vista Museum of Natural History & Science =

Natural history museum in California

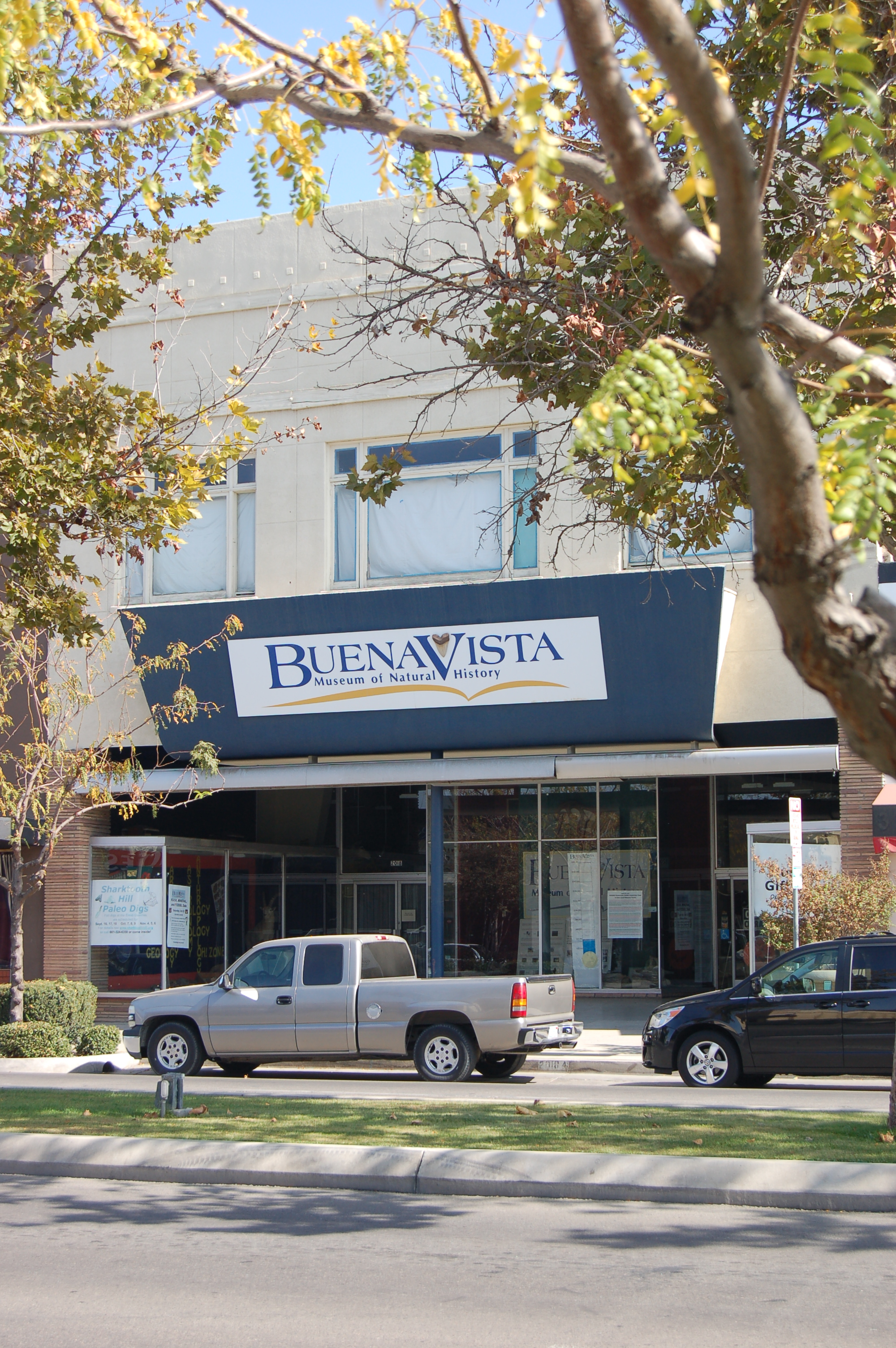
- Buena Vista Museum Exterior from Chester Ave.
- Established: 1995
- Location: Bakersfield, California
- Coordinates: 35.3776°N 119.0184°W
- Type: Natural history museum
- Public transit access: GET Rt. 2, 3, 4, 5, 8, 9, 12, 14 (Downtown Transit Center)
- Website: www.sharktoothhill.org

The Buena Vista Museum of Natural History & Science is a natural history museum in Bakersfield, California. It is located downtown in the Arts district. The museum focuses on three areas: geology, anthropology, and paleontology.

== History ==
The museum was founded in 1995. The museum was centered on the Bob and Mary Ernst Collection of Miocene fossils from Shark Tooth Hill (in Kern County). It is the largest collection of Miocene fossils from that location. Originally the museum was housed out of a small space in the California Living Museum (CALM). The collection would continue to grow, encompassing areas outside of Kern County. Because of the growth, the museum would move several times before arriving at the current location in downtown.

== Description ==
The centerpiece of the museum is the Mary Ernst Collection of Miocene fossils from Shark Tooth Hill. Other exhibits include: collection of taxidermy animals from Africa, replica of a triceratops skull, replica of a yokuts Indian village, and a model of Yosemite Valley complete with roads, buildings, and trails. Several of these items are not owned by museum, but are on long term loan. The museum also contains an interactive section known as the "Oh Zone". There is also a Paleo Lab, which is equipped to clean, repair, preserve, and reconstruct fossils and other artifacts.
