= Northeast Bakersfield =

- Region in Bakersfield
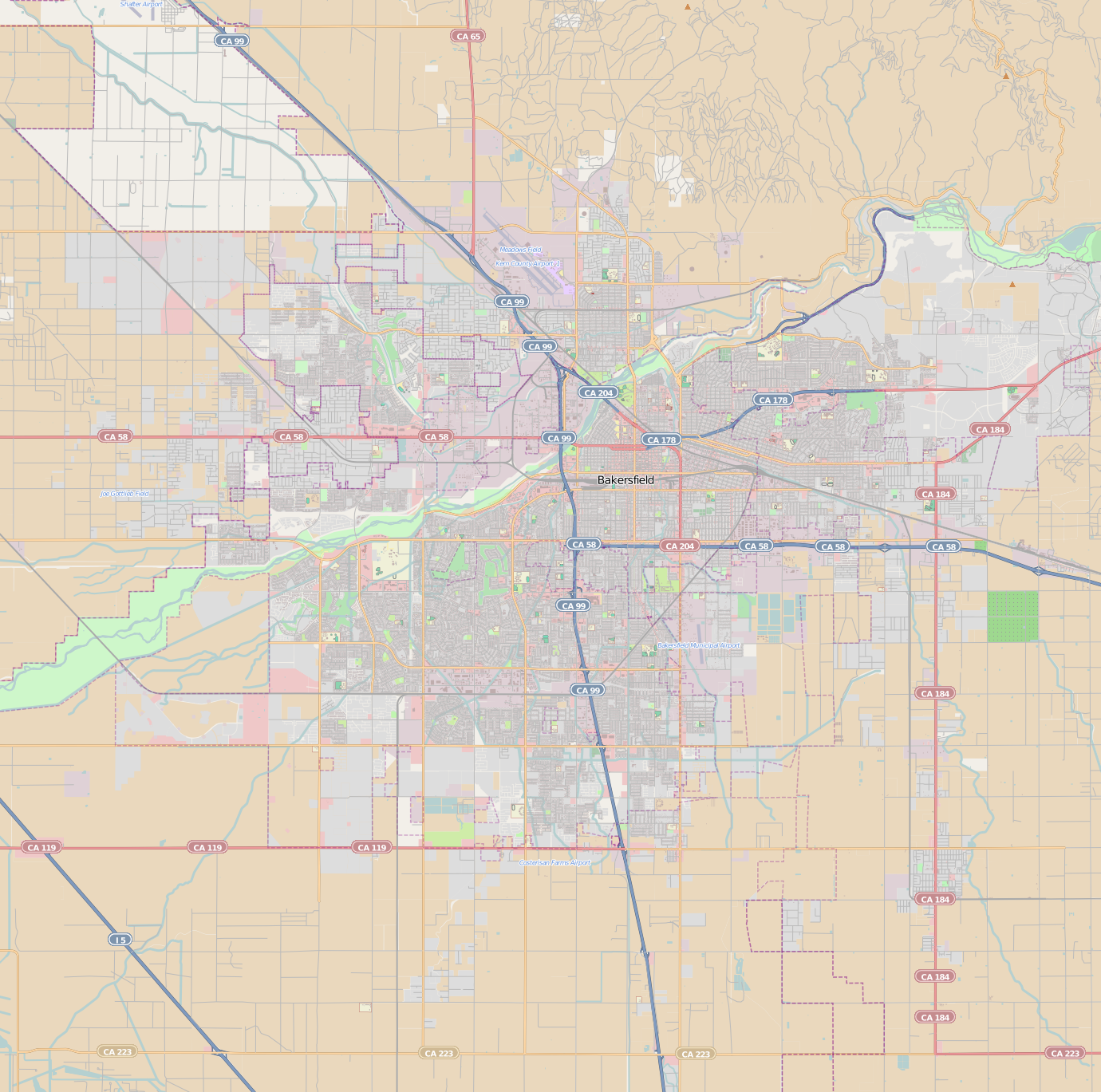
- Location within Bakersfield
- Coordinates: 35°24′47″N 118°54′54″W
- Country: United States
- State: California
- County: County of Kern
- City: City of Bakersfield
- Neighborhoods of Northeast: List: College Heights; Rio Bravo

Area
  - Total: 45.00 sq mi (116.5 km^{2})
- Estimate, contains both developed and undeveloped land.
- ZIP Code: 93306
- Area Code: 661

Northeast Bakersfield (commonly known as simply The Northeast) is the northeast region of Bakersfield, California. It is roughly bounded by Panorama Drive and the Kern River to the north, Alfred Harrell Highway/Comanche Drive to the east, Edison Highway to the south, and Union Avenue to the west. The region of East Bakersfield is located within these boundaries but is usually not considered part of the Northeast. Instead, the Northeast wraps around the boundaries of East Bakersfield (Union Avenue, Bernard Street, Mt. Vernon Avenue, and East California Avenue). Other boundaries are the city limits.

== Overview ==
Growth in the northeast started prior to World War II and accelerated in the Post-War era through the late 1970s. In preparation of future growth, a large section of land, extending to Kern River Canyon, was incorporated into the city in 1977. However, by the 1960s, growth shifted primarily to the southwest, leaving much of the land undeveloped. The area started to see increased growth in the late 1990s, but slowed in the late 2000s.

Some areas in northeast Bakersfield, particularly the Bakersfield Country Club and homes along Panorama Drive on the bluffs were historically some of the most affluent neighborhoods in Bakersfield. Overall, the Northeast is predominantly middle and upper middle class. The Northeast is home to Bakersfield's community college, Bakersfield College.

One of the centerpieces of entertainment and recreation in the Northeast was the East Hills Mall, a former indoor shopping mall located on Mall View Road between Oswell Street and Mount Vernon Ave., just south of Highway 178. The mall began doing very poorly during the economic downturn in the late 2000s, and by 2010 all major tenants had moved out. In late 2016, it was announced that the mall had been sold to developers, and in 2017 plans to demolish the old mall and build a new outdoor shopping center were announced.

Unlike most of Bakersfield, which sits on the flat valley floor floodplain, northeast Bakersfield is situated along rolling hills that formed a series of bluffs and are about 450 feet (137 m) higher in elevation than the rest of the city. The Panorama Bluffs provide scenic views of the Kern River oilfields, Oildale and downtown Bakersfield.

== Neighborhoods ==
=== College Heights ===
College Heights is almost exclusively a residential neighborhood. It is generally bounded by Union Avenue, Panorama Drive, and Columbus Street. It is one of the oldest neighborhoods in the region, and it saw growth in the early to mid-1950s. The centerpiece of the neighborhood is Bakersfield College. That location for the college was constructed in 1956 (the college was founded in 1913).

=== Rio Bravo ===
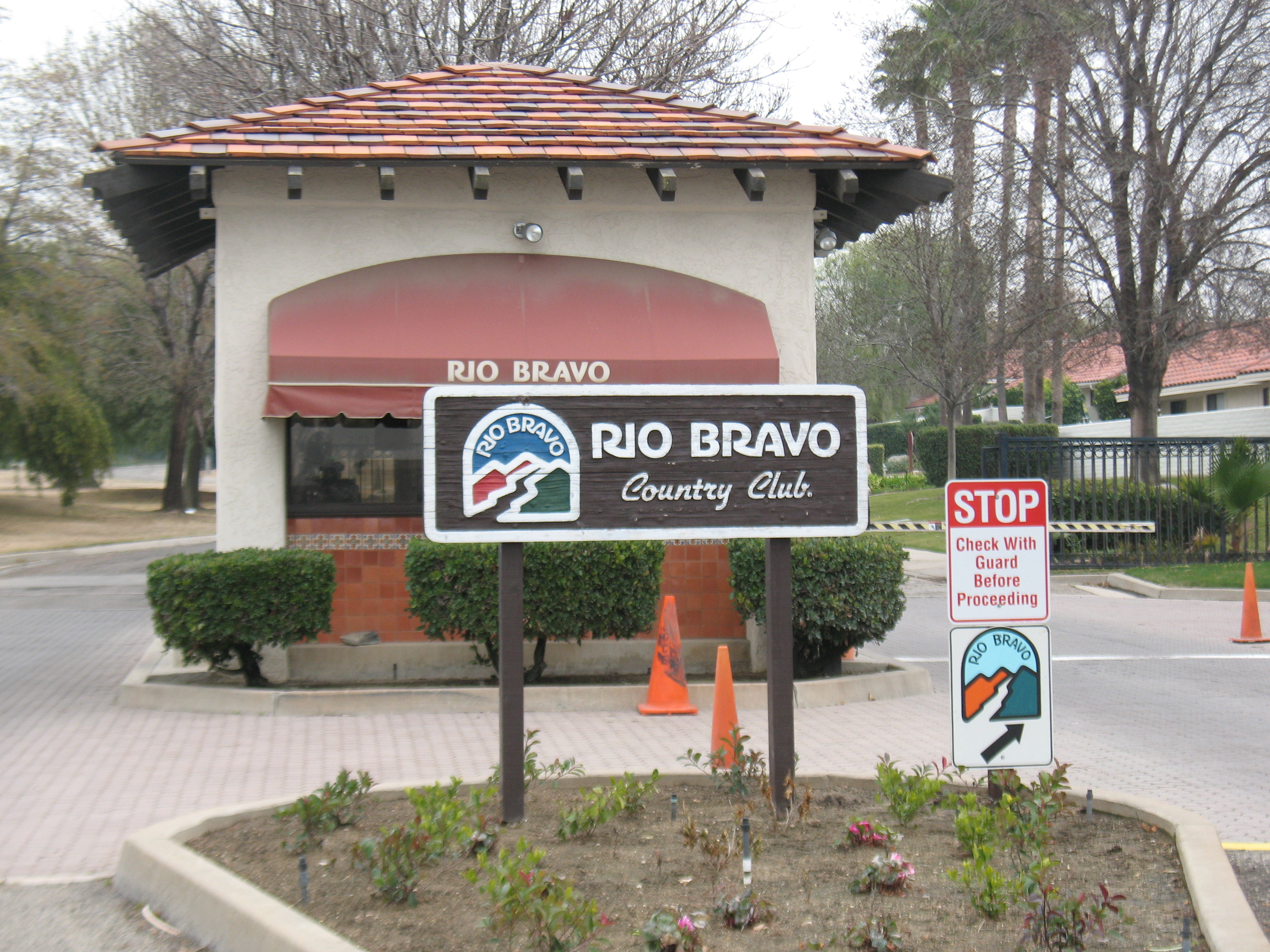
Rio Bravo

Rio Bravo is a mixture of residential and commercial. It generally refers to the land in the valley east of Morning Drive. Although much of the land has been incorporated into the city, it is mostly rural. Given the size of the area, it is likely that more neighborhoods will develop within Rio Bravo.

A major attraction to the area is the Kern River County Park, a large recreation area which includes: Hart Park, Kern County Soccer Park, California Living Museum (CALM), Lake Ming, and the Kern River Golf Course.

The Rio Bravo neighborhood is home to the Rio Bravo Country Club located just south of State Route 178. Previously, it also contained the Mesa Marin Raceway and Rio Bravo Resort, but both have closed. The Mesa Marin Sports Complex now sits on the former site of the raceway.

In the foothills on the northern part of the neighborhood is an extensive network of trails. The trails are used for hiking, equestrianism, ATV's, and dirt bikes. Although these trails exist, there is currently a lack of staging areas. As a result, people park their vehicles to the side of city roads to access them.
