= Bakersfield Sports Village =

Sports complex in Bakersfield, California

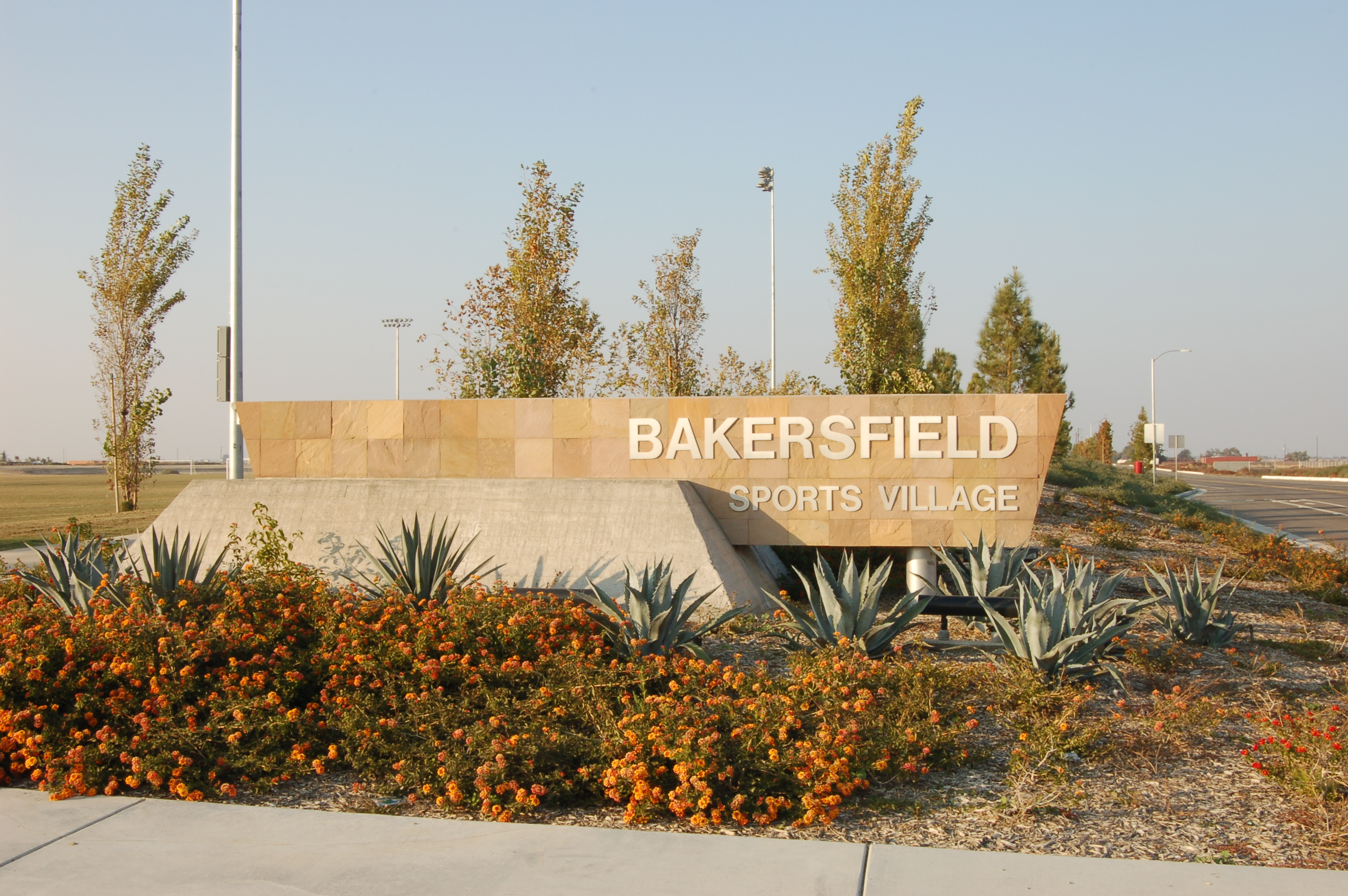
- Entrance sign off Ashe Road
- Interactive map of Bakersfield Sports Village
- Location: 9001 Ashe Road; Bakersfield, California 93313
- Coordinates: 35.269°N 119.082°W
- Owner: City of Bakersfield
- Surface: grass
- Field size: 16 Soccer fields 10 Baseball fields 4 Football fields
- Acreage: 170 acres (0.69 km^{2})

Construction
- Opened: July 27, 2011
- Architect: Rossetti architects

Website
- bakersfieldcity.us/recreation/sports_village.html

Bakersfield Sports Village, also known as Kaiser Permanente Sports Village, is a 170-acre (0.69 km^{2}) tournament-style sporting complex located in Bakersfield, California, located along Taft Highway between Ashe Road and Gosford Road. Phase 1 (which was completed in 2011) contains 8 soccer fields. When fully constructed, it will have 16 soccer fields, 10 baseball fields, 4 football fields, and an indoor gymnasium. There will also be a large stadium which can be configured for either soccer or football. Surrounding facilities will include a recreational park with a large lake, and two retail shopping areas.
