= Scarlet & Gray Golf Club =

Golf course in Bakersfield, California, US

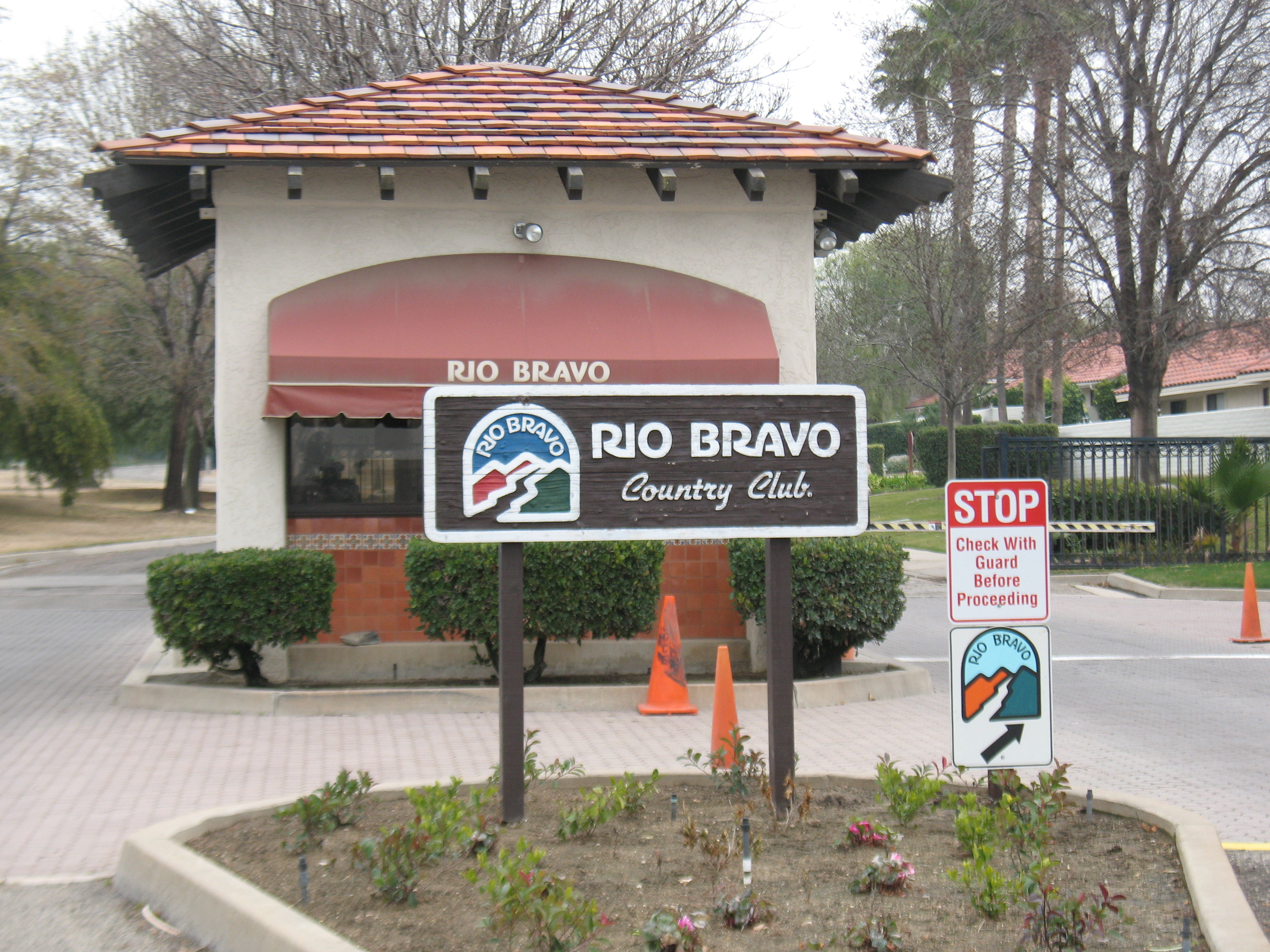
- Entrance to Scarlet & Gray
- Interactive map of Scarlet & Gray Golf Club
- 35.403°N 118.835°W

Club information
- Location: Bakersfield, California
- Established: 1975
- Type: Public
- Total holes: 18
- Tournaments: Bakersfield Open (1990–1991)
- Website: https://sggolfclub.com/
- Designed by: Robert Muir Graves
- Par: 72
- Length: 7,000 yards
- Course rating: 73.1

Scarlet And Gray Golf Club is an 18-hole private golf course located in the foothills in northeast Bakersfield, California. The course is 7,000 yards on hilly terrain designed by Robert Muir Graves. Since the course is located in the northeast, it is one of a few courses that are naturally hilly. It is a championship course, which hosted the Bakersfield Open, a Nike Tour event, between 1990 and 1991.

The course was originally designed to be a part of the Rio Bravo Resorts. However, the course was purchased in 1991, and became a private country club. The country club’s web site describes Hole 11 as one of the most challenging on the course. It writes, "Par Hole 11 at 616 yards from Blue Tees and you will the hero in your group."

In 2026 Rio Bravo Country Club was renamed Scarlet & Gray Golf Club

== Scorecard ==
Rio Bravo Country Club
Tee	Rating/Slope	1	2	3	4	5	6	7	8	9	Out	10	11	12	13	14	15	16	17	18	In	Total
Blue	73.1/131	406	387	568	426	223	552	410	192	372	3536	405	616	392	226	446	345	155	358	521	3464	7000
White	70.4/125	373	370	548	406	191	529	388	162	354	3321	365	596	336	185	419	326	144	331	498	3200	6521
Par	Men's	4	4	5	4	3	5	4	3	4	36	4	5	4	3	4	4	3	4	5	36	72
SI	Men's	12	14	16	2	6	8	4	18	10		9	1	13	5	3	15	17	7	11
Red	73.0/123	322	319	498	352	160	473	345	137	303	2909	313	526	302	157	370	278	109	289	451	2795	5704
Par	Ladies	4	4	5	4	3	5	4	3	4	36	4	5	4	3	4	4	3	4	5	36	72
SI	Ladies	14	12	4	8	16	2	6	18	10		15	1	11	13	5	9	17	7	3
