= Gloria Roe =

American composer, pianist and singer

Gloria Ann Kliewer Roe Robertson (5 January 1935 – 20 January 2017) was an American composer, pianist and singer who was best known for her compositions and performances of sacred music. She published and performed as Gloria Roe.

Roe was born in Bakersfield, California, to Peter and Sarah Bartel Kliewer. Her first composition, a hymn, was published by Word Publishing Company when she was a senior in high school. She studied piano with Frances Zulawinski and attended the Hollywood School of Music, Pasadena College (today Point Loma Nazarene University), the Screen Guild School of Music, and Trinity College London.

Roe made her piano debut at Carnegie Hall at age 11. She married Ted Samuel Roe in 1953. They had two children, and performed and recorded together. She later married Mr. Robertson and had two more children. Roe worked at several different churches in northwest Arkansas, including University Baptist Church, Central United Methodist Church, and Covenant Presbyterian Church.

In 1977, Roe was elected to the Sacred Music Hall of Fame. She also received the Bank of America Fine Arts Award. She performed with the Stockholm, London, and Israel Symphonies and with Eddie Cantor, the Billy Graham Crusades, and Al Jolson. Her compositions have been performed by Anita Bryant, Tennessee Ernie Ford, and Billy Joel.

Roe's LP records were produced by RCA Victor and Word Records. Her compositions (words and music) were published by Rodeheaver, Hall Mack Company and Word Publications, Inc. and included:

== Cantata ==
- In the Fullness of Time

== Hymns ==
- Abiding Love
- Be Calm My Soul
- Coming Home
- Does It Make Any Difference to You
- He is Love
- His Grace is Sufficient
- How Can I Tell You Father
- I Am Unworthy of the Price He Paid for Me
- Loved Me, Bought Me, Saved Me, Cleansed Me
- So Great Salvation Has Won My Heart
- Surrender
- That's What He Did for Me
- The Greatest of These is Love
- Unworthy
- Why Can't I Say I'm Sorry?
