= Buck Owens Crystal Palace =

Music venue, museum and night club in Bakersfield, California

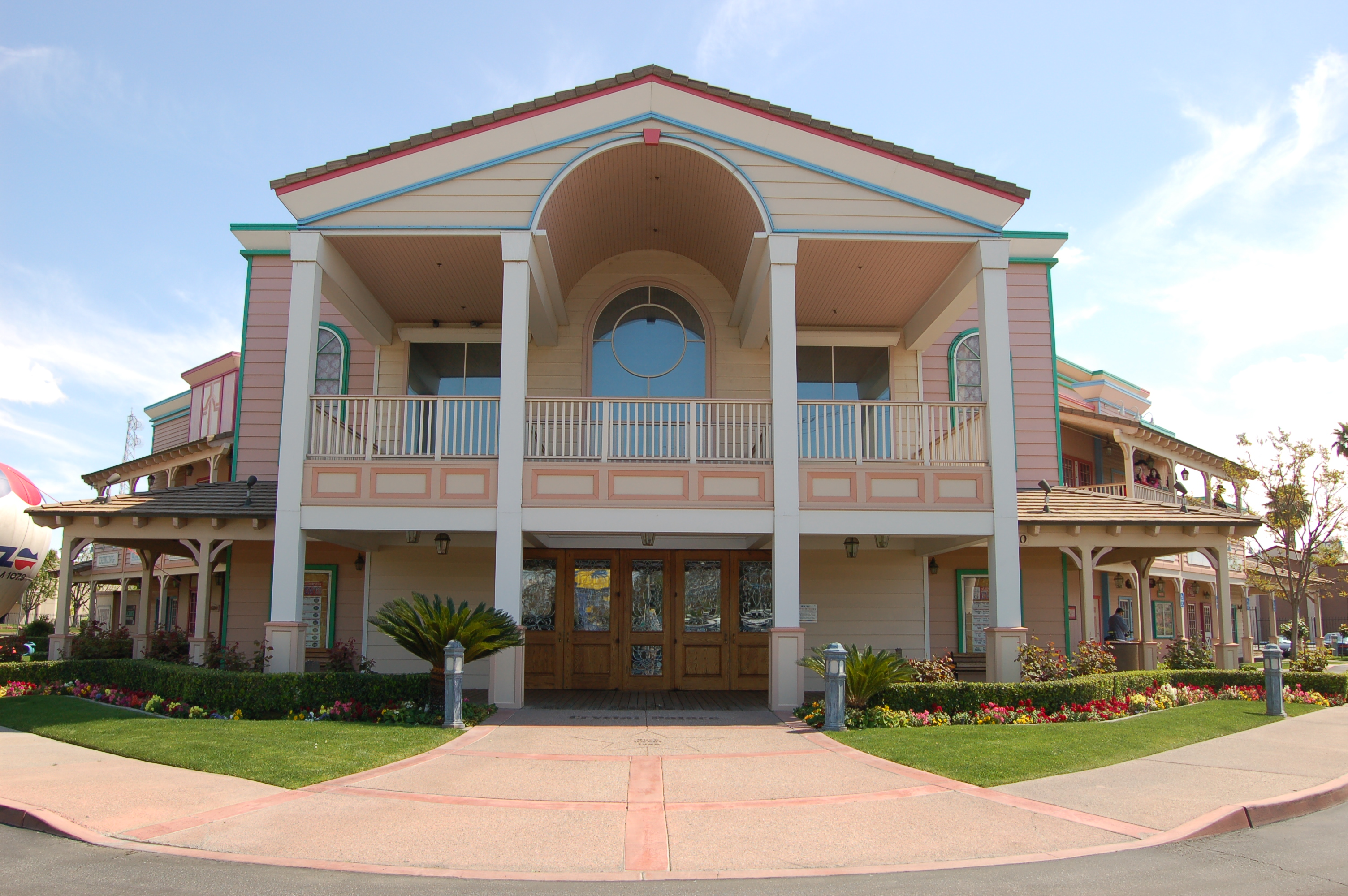
- Entrance
- Interactive map of Buck Owens Crystal Palace
- Address: 2800 Buck Owens Blvd.
- Location: Bakersfield, California
- Coordinates: 35.386°N 119.043°W
- Capacity: 550 (est.)
- Type: Music Hall

Construction
- Opened: October 23, 1996
- Closed: August 2025

Website
- www.buckowens.com

Buck Owens Crystal Palace was a music hall located in Bakersfield, California. It was constructed by Buck Owens, and was opened in 1996. Primarily it was a performance venue for country music, although other music genres have been heard there. It was also the home of the Buck Owens Museum, which contains items related to his career (some of the items are also available for viewing online). It was also a nightclub, bar, restaurant, and museum.

The Crystal Palace is designed in the Western Revival style, a style that resembles buildings from the 19th-century American Old West. The interior resembles an American western town from that same period. The museum is located in display cases around the first floor, which resemble the windows to the building.

== History ==
The idea for the Buck Owens Crystal Palace originated in the mid-1980s. Buck spent most of his early career performing in small, smoke-filled bars and “honky-tonks” around the country. He wanted a high-class place for country-western music to be performed. Buck also wanted a place where he could be himself.

Construction started in the mid-1990s. Buck was closely involved with the project. He approved 135 change orders, several costing over $100,000. He also did not visualize from plans as well as seeing the actual construction. According to Jim Shaw (Buck Owens's right-hand man), on some occasions, he would see something constructed, and have it reconstructed larger and moved to a different location.

The cost of the project would eventually reach $7.4 million. Also, the large number of change orders would delay the opening over a year. The Crystal Palace was opened in 1996, and is considered a Bakersfield landmark.

While the business continued to operate, the Foundation overseeing it was looking for a new buyer. The Crystal Palace closed in August 2025.

== See also ==
- List of music museums
