= Jefferson Park (Bakersfield) =

Park in California, United States

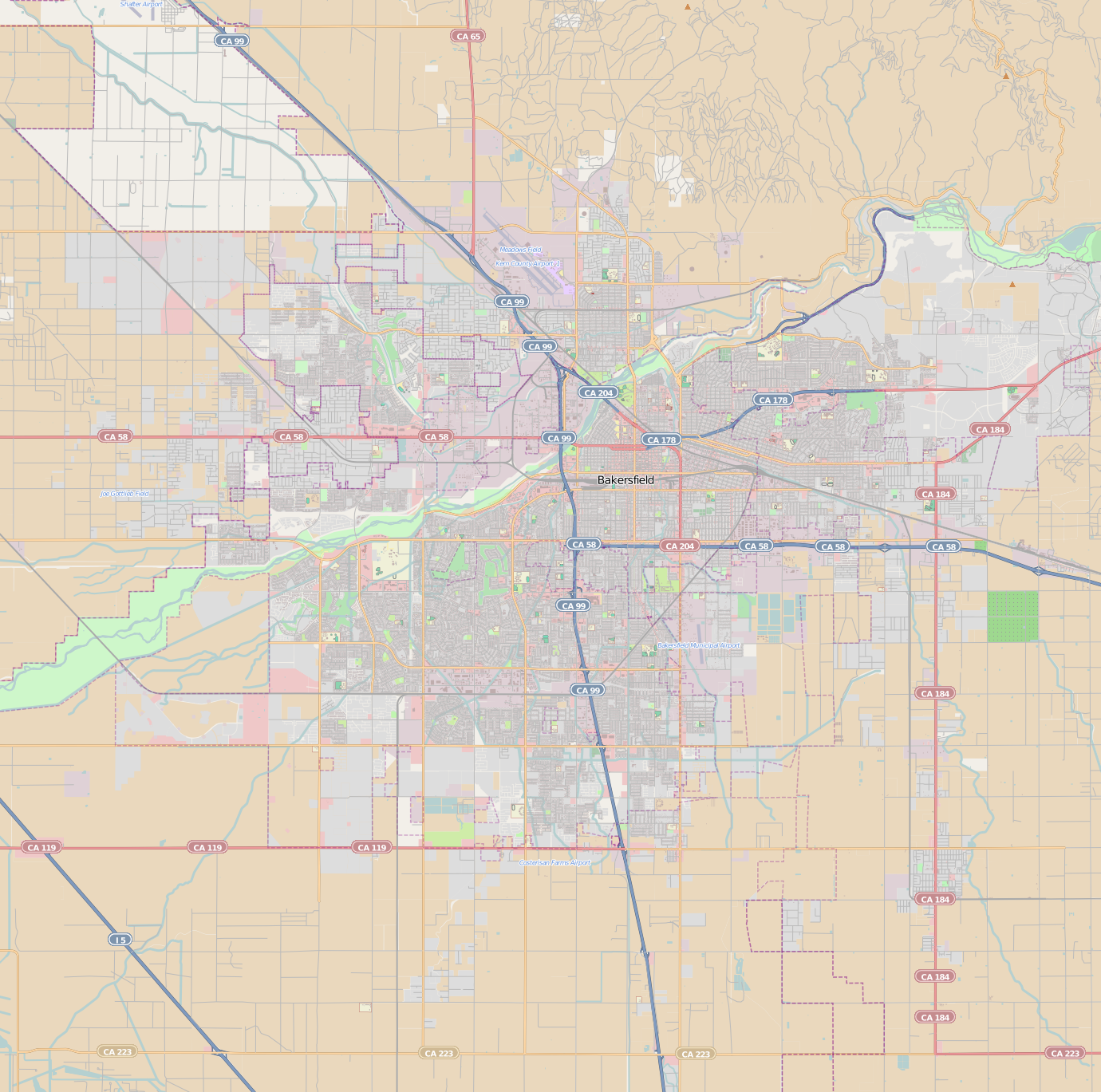
- Location within Bakersfield, California Location within California
- Type: Public Park
- Location: Bakersfield, California
- Coordinates: 35°23′20″N 118°59′10″W
- Area: 7 acres (28,000 m^{2})
- Created: 1921
- Operator: Bakersfield Department of Recreation and Parks
- Open: All year

Jefferson Park is a public park located in Bakersfield, California.

== History ==
Land for the park was purchased by the city on May 24, 1921. On August 22, the land was incorporated into the city's park system (the same day as Central Park). The same day, the bid from MacRorie and McLaren Company was accepted for its development. This also represented part of Bakersfield's early development of East Bakersfield (formerly Sumner and Kern City) which was annexed in 1910.

== Amenities ==
Jefferson Park is one of the more equipped parks in the city. It contains one reservable picnic area with lights, barbecue, and a sheltered serving area. There are several other picnic areas, each serving between 8 and 16 people. Most also have a barbecue. There are four lit basketball courts, two lit tennis courts, and lit horseshoe pits. There is also a large open grass area suitable for many lawn sports. There are also two swimming pools and a spray park. One is for general use while the other is for children. There are also restrooms and a playground.

The park is also equipped with an open outdoor amphitheater. It is one of two parks with terraced seating on grass. Of the three parks with this type of facility, Jefferson's is the simplest; consisting of a concrete slab and a metal roof.
