= California Living Museum =

Zoo in Bakersfield, California

- Interactive map of California Living Museum
- 35.432°N 118.886°W
- Date opened: 1983
- Location: 10500 Alfred Harrell Hwy Bakersfield, California 93306
- Land area: 14 acres (5.7 ha)
- No. of animals: 250
- No. of species: 80
- Memberships: ZAA
- Website: www.calmzoo.org

The California Living Museum (commonly referred to as CALM) is a zoo in Bakersfield, California. The primary focuses are plants and animals that are native to California, specifically Kern County.

The California Living Museum is accredited by the Zoological Association of America (ZAA).

== History ==
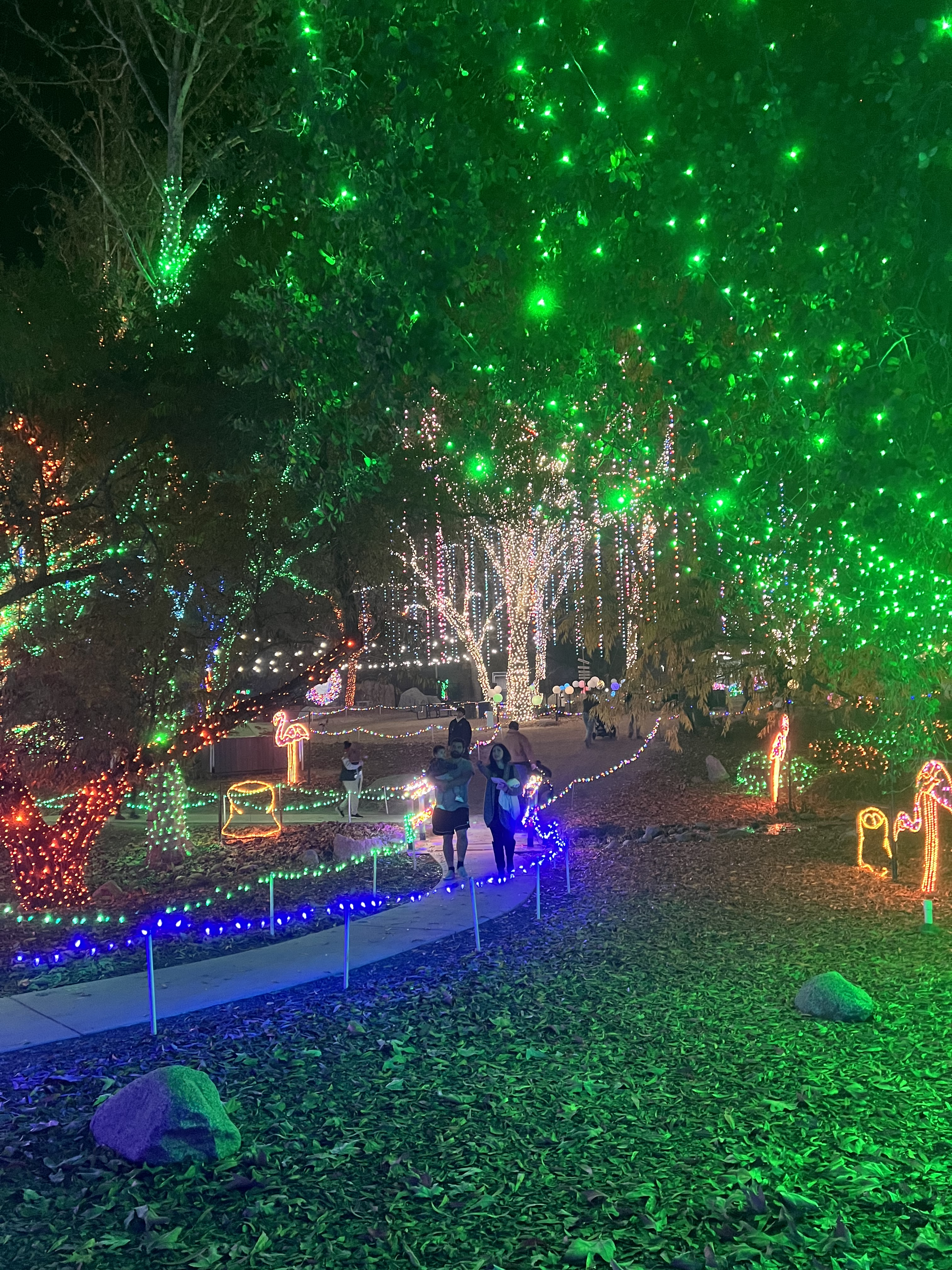
HolidayLights at CALM, 2024

CALM was founded in 1983. Its purpose was to provide a place to both educate the public about native wildlife, as well as to help injured and orphaned wild animals. Those that could be released into the wild would be, while others would be cared for in the facility. A campaign went out to many service organizations to sponsor buildings within the facility. After three years, the zoo was opened to the public.

In 1998, the day-to-day operations of The California Living Museum were transferred to the Kern Superintendent of Schools offices (KCSOS). The zoo and botanical gardens became an official school site. CALM provides education to more than 13,000 Kern County school children annually through on-site programs. Many programs are also presented off-site to classrooms, organizations and at community events.

CALM received accreditation from the Zoological Association of America (ZAA) in 2010.

== Description ==
CALM is 14 acres (5.7 ha) and contains a wide variety of plants and animals from around Kern County. The California Living Museum exists to display and interpret native California animals, plants, fossils and artifacts to teach a respect for all living things through education, recreation, conservation and research. Located on 14 park-like acres, CALM's zoo features over 80 species of medically unreleasable animals. Only animals injured or who cannot survive in their native environment are housed at CALM. Several endangered species may be seen on exhibit. Natural exhibits include:

- An open black bear exhibit.
- Cats of California exhibit featuring mountain lions and bobcats.
- Bird of Prey Exhibit with hawks, owls and eagles.
- A mammal round that houses several species of foxes.
- A waterfowl pond that attracts spring and fall migrants and hosts resident mallards.
- A deer yard.
- An underground reptile house.
- A contact area with domestic animals.

The DiGiorgio Education Center, which is the visitor's first stop, houses the gift store, a reading library, Miocene and Pleistocene fossils, and children's discovery rooms with rotating interactive activities.

CALM also provides services which include birthday parties, weddings and other group events.

The California Living Museum is a permitted rehabilitation facility and has a staff trained to care for injured wildlife. The primary goal of rehabilitation is to release the wildlife back into their natural habitat. CALM rehabilitates approximately 300-500 injured and orphaned animals annually.

In addition to animals, CALM also contains several plant communities. These replicate a variety of environments from around Kern County, from the mountains, to the Mojave Desert. Such walks include the “Trees of California,” which showcases the trees found of the western and eastern mountain ranges. The riparian is a miniature replica of the Kern River, as it descends from the mountains to the valley floor. There is also a desert community, used to replicate the eastern desert.

During the Christmas season, from November 28 to December 30, CALM hosts a month-long event called “HolidayLights at CALM.” The zoo is decorated with millions of lights to form scenes of animals and Kern County landscapes. Certain areas flash in sequence to music playing at each scene, while others feature lite displays of native animals. The displays are designed by Josh Barnett's Lightasmic. Each year, more scenes are added for a larger, more impressive display.
