= Kern County, California =

County in California, United States

Kern County
- County
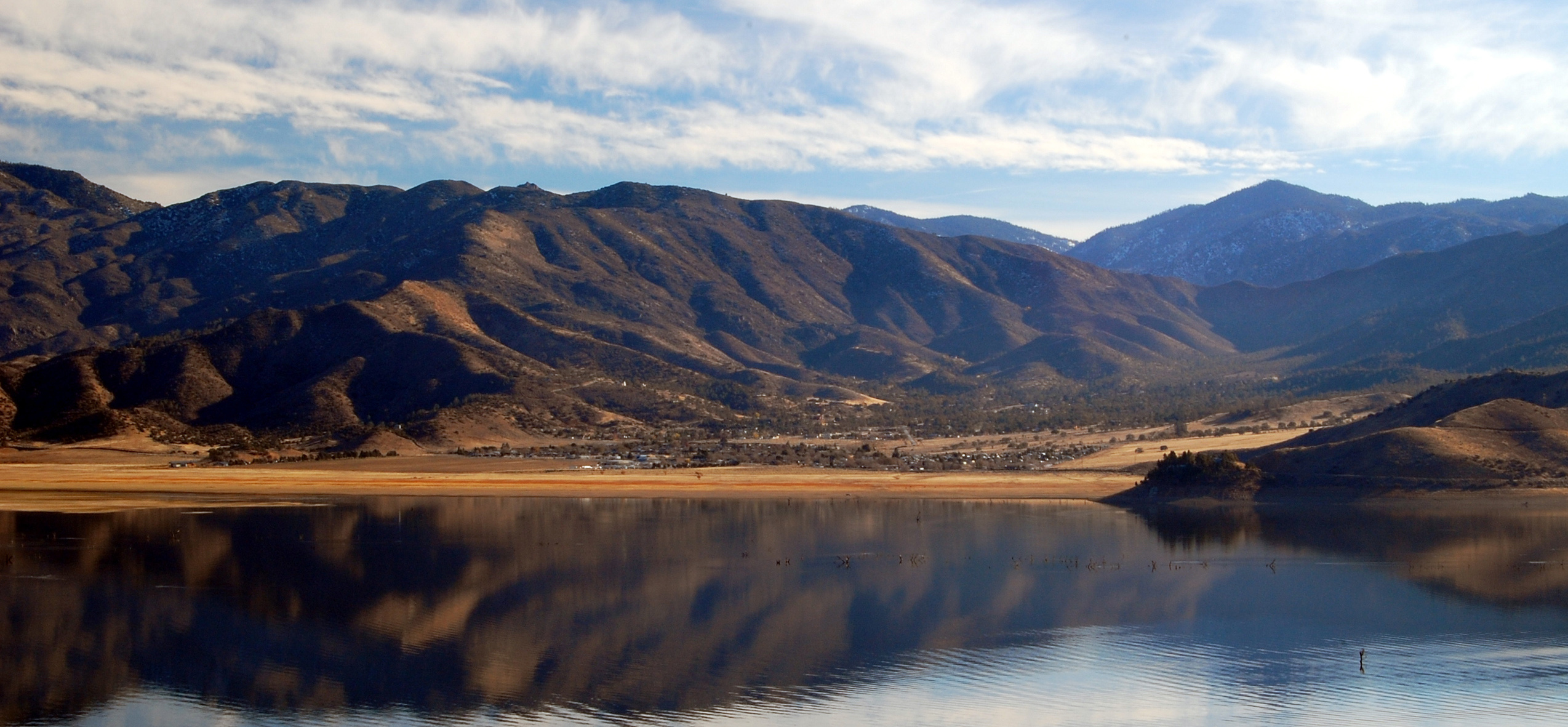
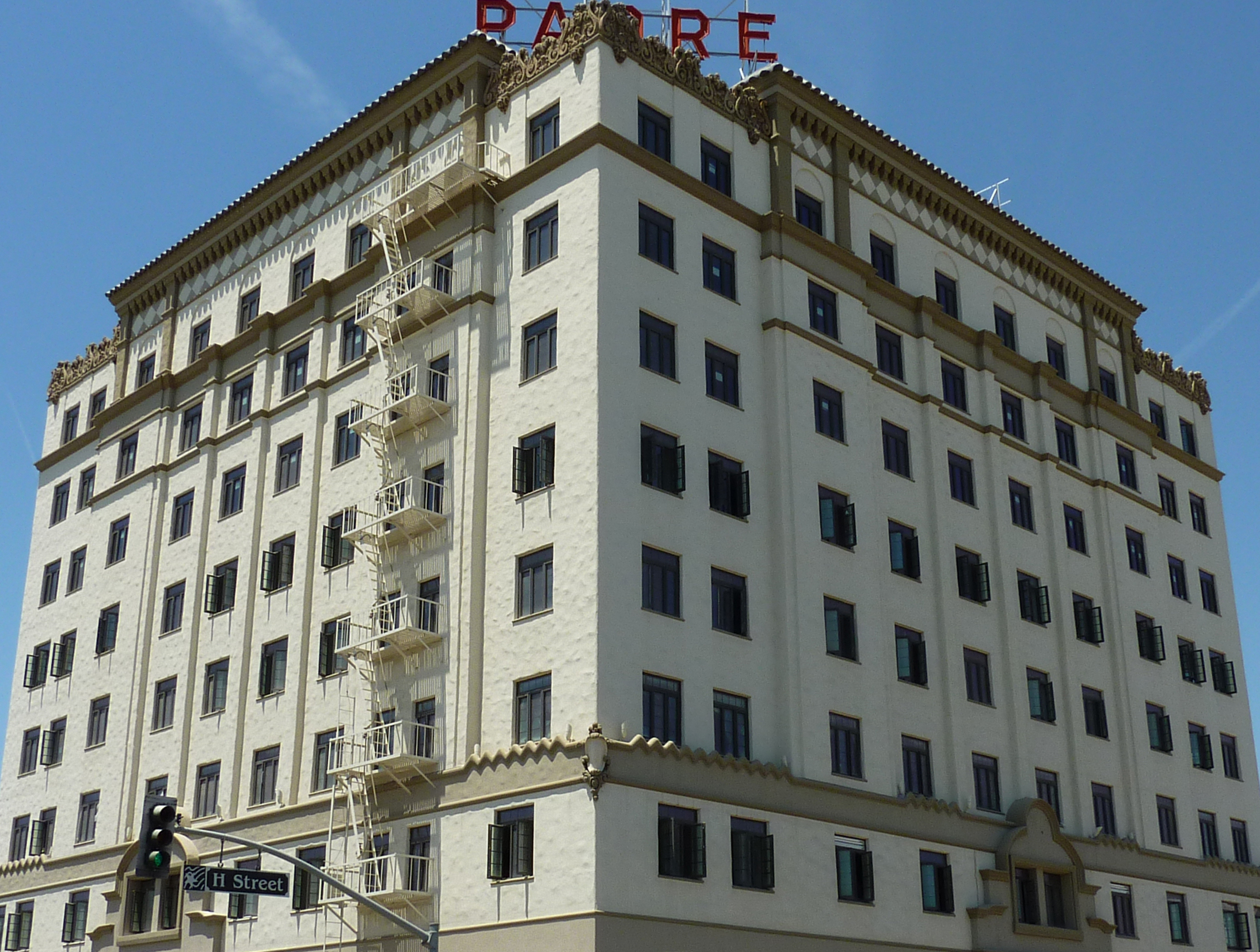
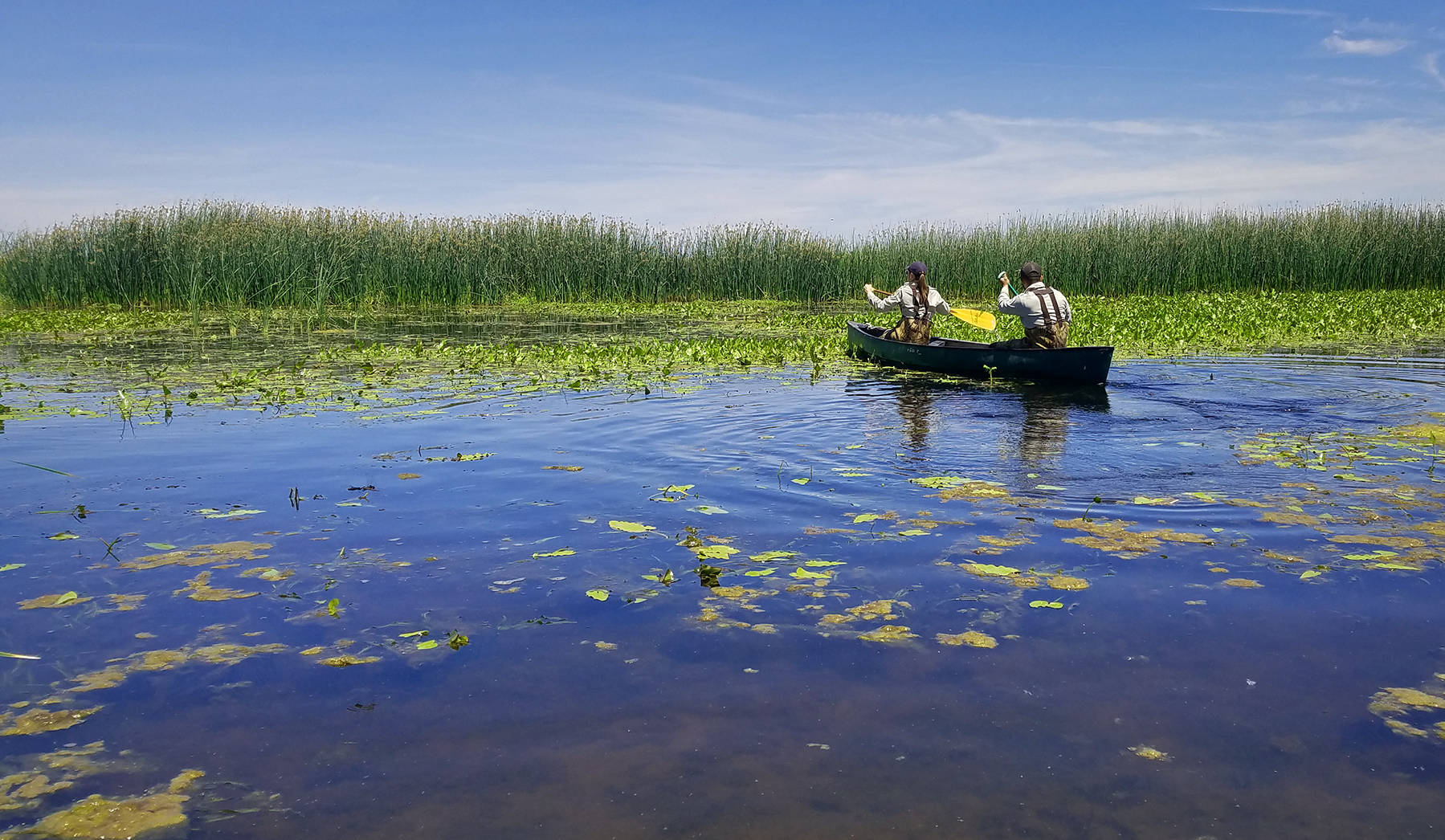
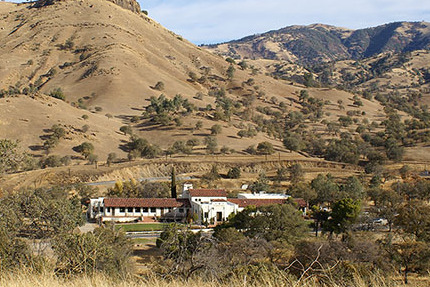
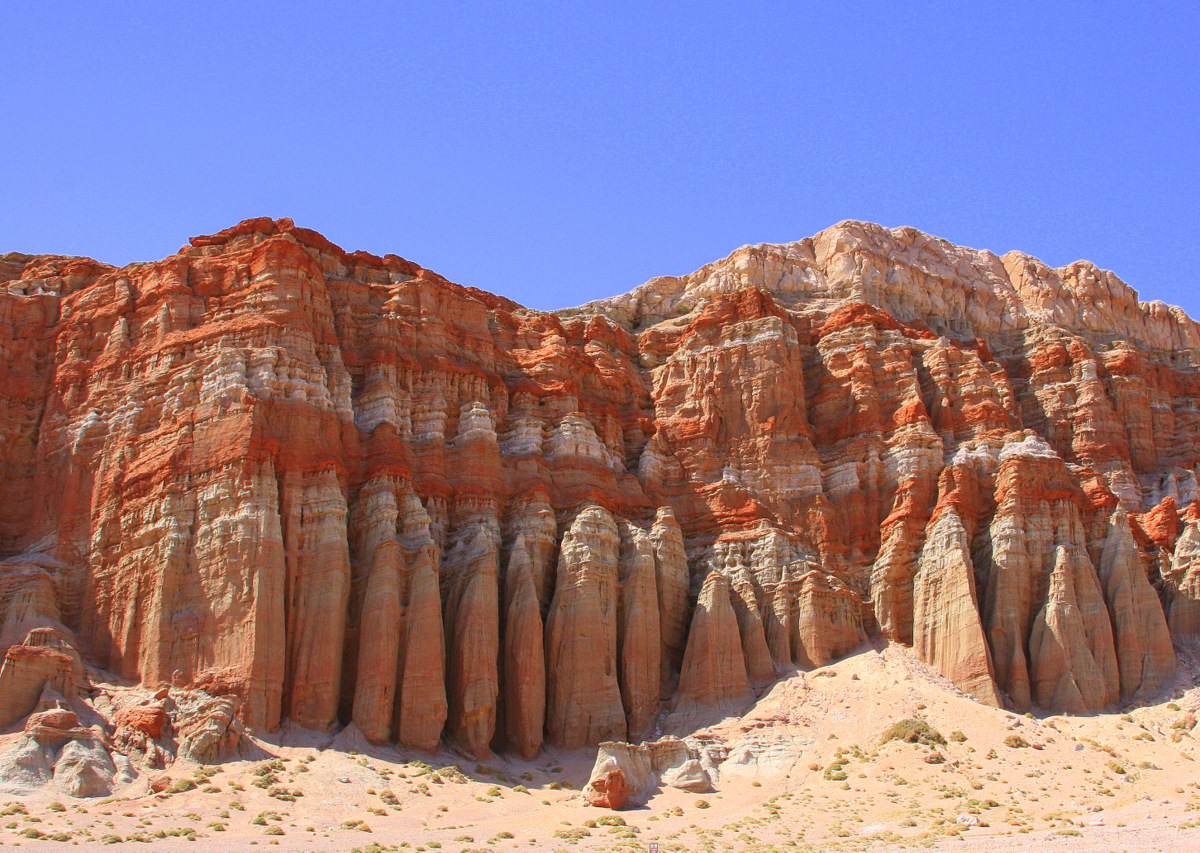
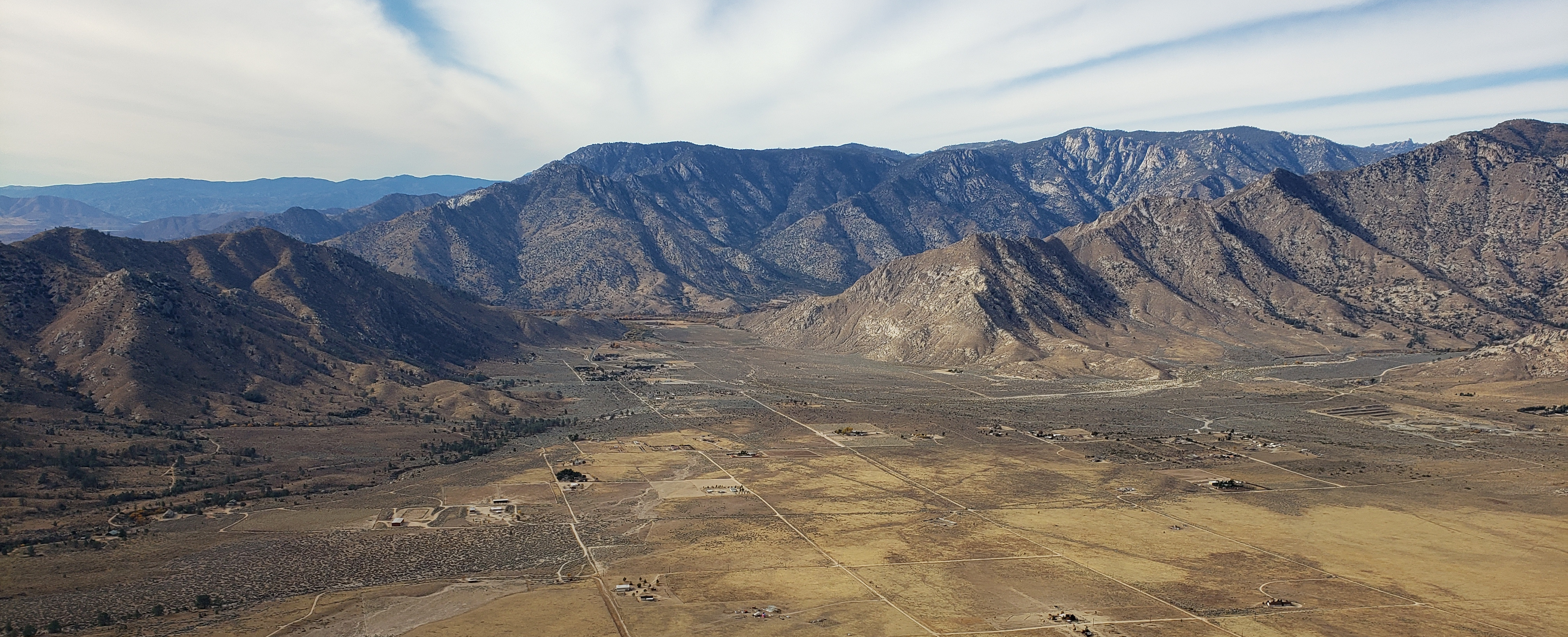
- Lake Isabella in the Sierra Nevada Bakersfield Kern Wildlife Refuge Chávez Monument Red Rock Canyon Canebrake Ecological Reserve

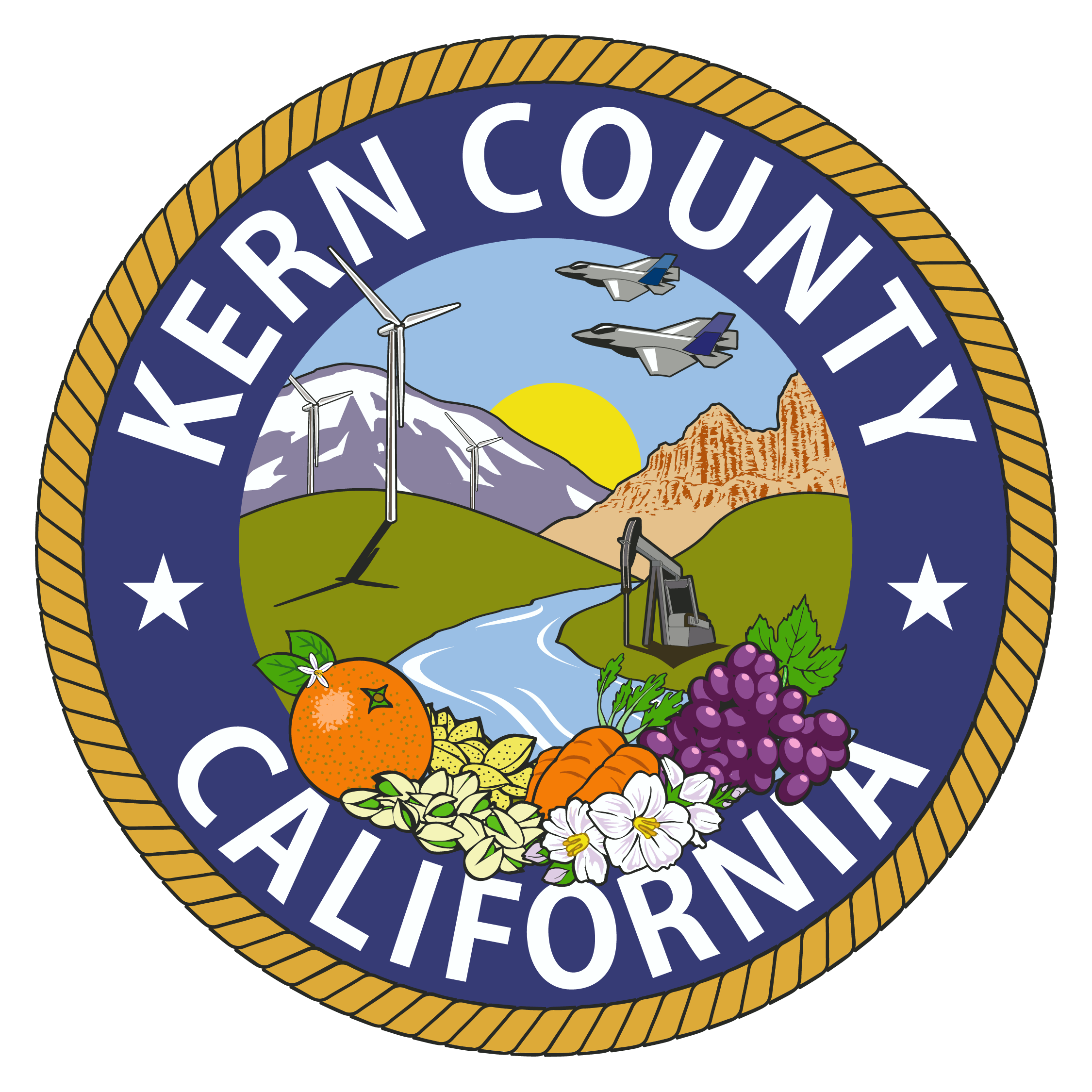
- Flag Seal
- Interactive map of Kern County
- Location in the state of California
- Coordinates: 35.34°N 118.72°W
- Country: United States
- State: California
- Region: San Joaquin Valley
- Incorporated: April 2, 1866; 160 years ago
- Named for: Kern River and Edward Kern
- County seat: Bakersfield
- Largest city: Bakersfield (population); California City (area)
- Incorporated cities: 11

Government
  - Type: Council–Administration
  - Body: Board of Supervisors
  - Chair: Phillip Peters
  - Vice Chair: Leticia Perez
  - Board of Supervisors: Supervisors: Phillip Peters; Chris Parlier; Jeff Flores; David Couch; Leticia Perez
  - County Administrative Officer: Nancy Anderson

Area
  - Total: 8,163 sq mi (21,140 km^{2})
  - Land: 8,132 sq mi (21,060 km^{2})
  - Water: 31 sq mi (80 km^{2})
- Highest elevation: 8,755 ft (2,669 m)
- Lowest elevation: 206 ft (63 m)

Population (2020 Census)
  - Total: 909,235
  - Estimate (2025): 927,068 ▲
  - Density: 111.8/sq mi (43.17/km^{2})

GDP
  - Total: $57.541 billion (2022)
- Time zone: UTC−8 (Pacific Time Zone)
  - Summer (DST): UTC−7 (Pacific Daylight Time)
- Area code: 661, 760
- FIPS code: 06-029
- GNIS feature ID: 2054176
- Congressional districts: 20th, 22nd, 23rd
- Website: kerncounty.com

Kern County is located in the U.S. state of California. As of the 2020 census, the population was 909,235. Its county seat is Bakersfield.

Kern County comprises the Bakersfield, California, metropolitan statistical area. The county spans the southern end of the Central Valley. Covering 8,161.42 square miles (21,138.0 km^{2}), it ranges west to the southern slope of the Coast Ranges, and east beyond the southern slope of the eastern Sierra Nevada into the Mojave Desert, at the city of Ridgecrest. Its northernmost city is Delano, and its southern reach extends to just beyond Frazier Park, and the northern extremity of the parallel Antelope Valley.

The county's economy is heavily linked to agriculture and petroleum extraction. Also, a strong aviation, space, and military industry is present, such as Edwards Air Force Base, the China Lake Naval Air Weapons Station, and the Mojave Air and Space Port.

With a population that is 54.9% Hispanic as of 2020, Kern is California's third-most populous majority-Hispanic county and the sixth-largest nationwide.

== History ==
=== Indigenous Era ===
Native Americans lived in this region for hundreds of years: Chumash, tribes grouped together under the settler name Yokuts, and others.

=== Spanish era ===
Spain claimed the area in 1769. Entering from Grapevine Canyon to the south in 1772, Commander Don Pedro Fages became the first European known to set foot in the area.

The Battle of San Emigdio took place in Kern County in March 1824. The Chumash Native Americans of Mission Santa Barbara rebelled against the Mexican government and its taking over mission property and ejecting the natives. The battle occurred in the canyon where San Emigdio Creek flows down San Emigdio Mountain and the Blue Ridge, south of Bakersfield near today's Highway 166. Mexican forces from Monterey were commanded by Carlos Carrillo and the conflict was a low-casualty encounter, with only four Native Americans being killed and no Mexicans. The surviving Native Americans were pacified and brought back to Santa Barbara in June 1824 after a pursuit and negotiation, in which many were allowed to keep their arms for the return march over the mountains.

=== American era ===
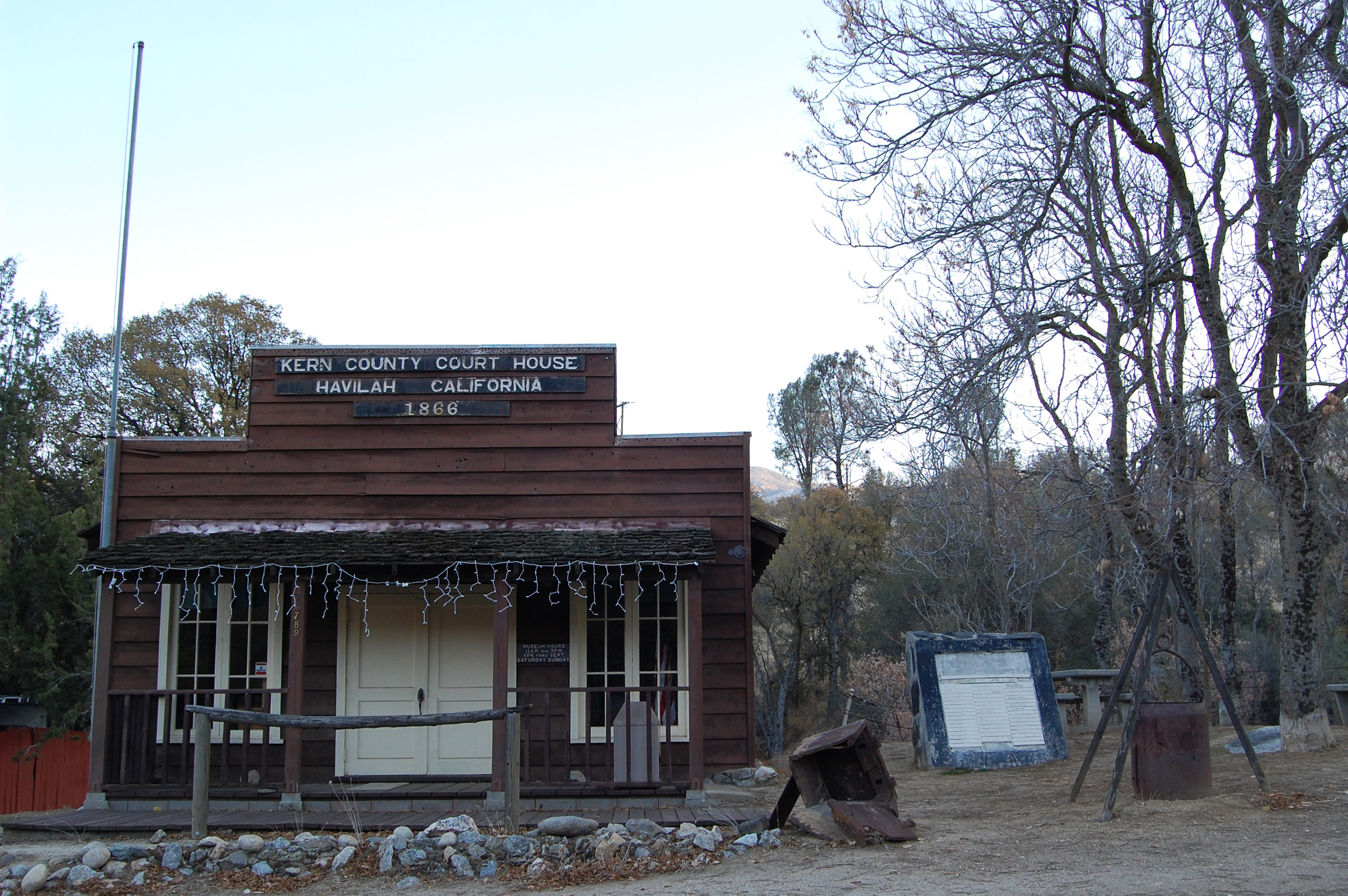
The Havilah Court Building was restored in the 1970s and served as a museum until its destruction in the 2024 Borel Fire: Photo circa 2007.

In the beginning, what was to become Kern County was dominated by mining in the mountains and in the desert. In 1855, the California legislature attempted to form a county in the area by giving the southeastern territory of Tulare County on the west of the Sierra Nevada Mountains to Buena Vista County. it was never officially organized prior to 1859, though, when the enabling legislation expired. The south of Tulare County was later organized as Kern County in 1866, with additions from Los Angeles and San Bernardino Counties. Its first county seat was the mining town of Havilah, in the mountains east of Bakersfield and north of Tehachapi.

Settlers considered the flat land of the valley inhospitable and impassable at the time due to swamps, lakes, tule reeds, and diseases such as malaria. This changed when residents started draining land for farming and constructing canals, most dug by hired Chinese laborers. Within 10 years, the valley surpassed the mining areas as the economic power of the county, and as a result, the county seat was moved from Havilah to Bakersfield in 1874.

In 1899, the discovery well of the Kern River Oil Field was dug by hand, and soon the towns of Oil City, Oil Center, and Oildale came into existence.

==== Etymology ====
The county derives its name from the Kern River, which was named for Edward Kern, cartographer for General John C. Frémont's 1845 expedition, which crossed Walker Pass. The Kern River was originally named Rio Bravo de San Felipe by Father Francisco Garcés when he explored the area in 1776.

==== Earthquakes ====
Throughout recorded history, severe earthquakes have struck Kern County, including the 1857 Fort Tejon earthquake.

On July 21, 1952, an earthquake occurred with the epicenter about 23 miles (37 km) south of Bakersfield. It measured 7.3 on the moment magnitude scale and killed 12 people. In addition to the deaths, it was responsible for hundreds of injuries and more than $60 million in property damage. The main shock was felt over much of California and as far away as Phoenix, Arizona, and Reno, Nevada. The earthquake occurred on the White Wolf Fault and was the strongest to occur in California since the 1906 San Francisco earthquake. Tehachapi suffered the greatest damage and loss of life from the earthquake, though its effects were widely felt throughout central and southern California. The event had a significant aftershock sequence that persisted into July and August, with the strongest coming on August 22, an M5.8 event with a maximum perceived intensity of VIII (severe) and resulted in two additional deaths and an additional $10 million in property damage. Repercussions of the sequence of earthquakes were still being felt in the heavily damaged downtown area of Bakersfield well into the 1990s, as city leaders attempted to improve safety of the surviving unreinforced masonry buildings.

Following the event, a field survey was conducted along the fault zone, with the goal of estimating the peak ground acceleration of the shock based on visually evaluating rock formations and other indicators. Ground disturbances that were created by the earthquakes were also surveyed, both in the valley and in the foothills, with both vertical and horizontal displacements present in the epicenter area. The motion records that were acquired from the event were significant, and a reconnaissance report was recognized for its coverage of the event, and its setting a standard for similar engineering or scientific papers.

==== Abuse trials ====
Between 1983 and 1986, several ritual sex ring child-abuse cases occurred in Kern County, resulting in numerous long prison sentences, all of which were overturned—some of them decades later, because the prosecutors had coerced false testimonies from the purported child victims. The details of these false accusations are covered extensively in the 2008 documentary Witch Hunt, narrated by Sean Penn.

== Geography ==
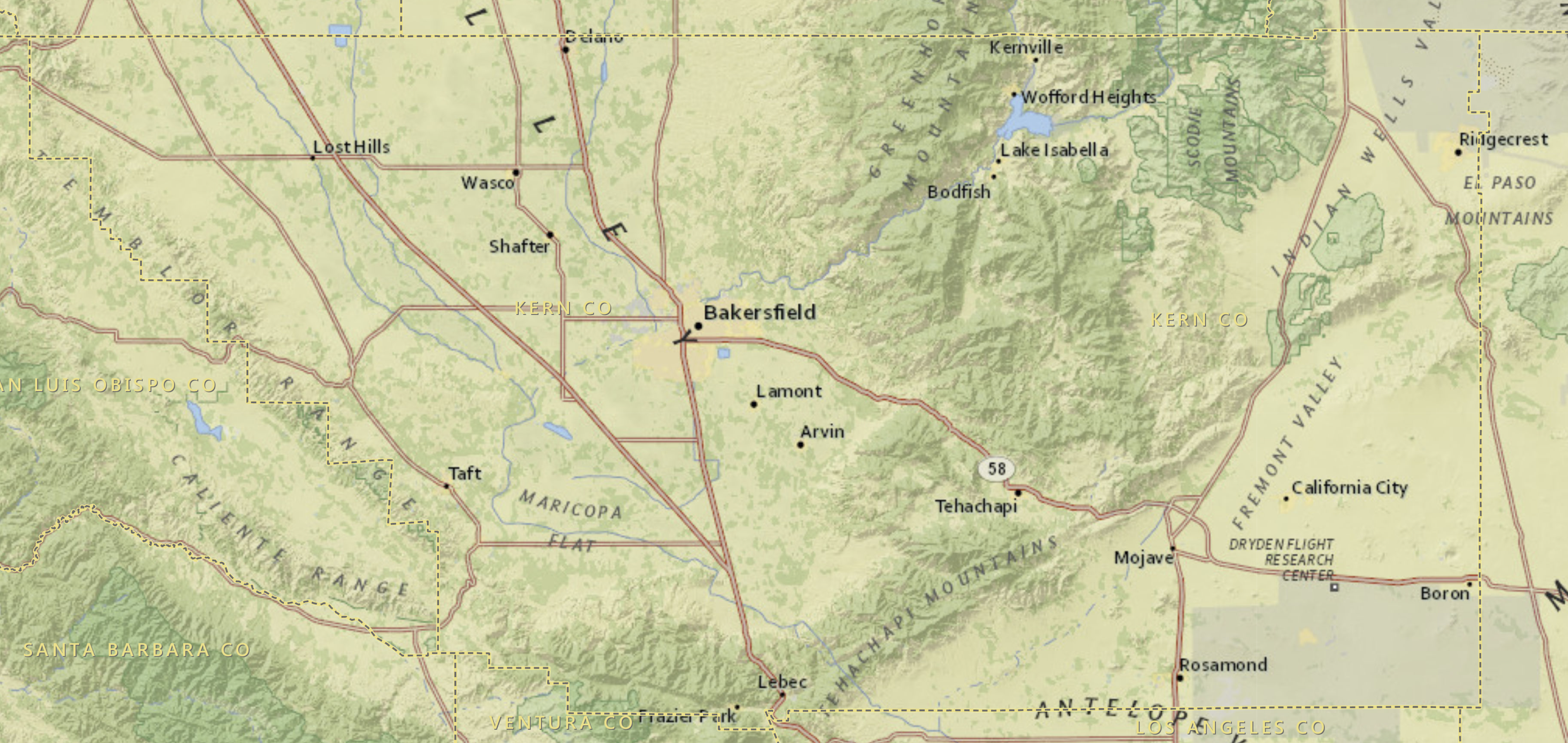
Map of Kern County

According to the United States Census Bureau, the county has a total area of 8,163 square miles (21,140 km^{2}), of which 31 square miles (80 km^{2}) (0.4%) is covered by water. It is the third-largest county by area in California. The tallest peak in the county is Sawmill Mountain with an elevation of 2,689 metres (8,822 feet). Its area is nearly the size of the state of New Hampshire; it extends:

- East beyond the southern slope of the Sierra Nevada range into the Mojave Desert, and includes parts of the Indian Wells Valley and Antelope Valley
- West from the Sierra across the floor of the San Joaquin Valley to the eastern edge of the Temblor Range, part of the Coast Ranges
- South over the ridge of the Tehachapi Mountains

=== Air quality ===
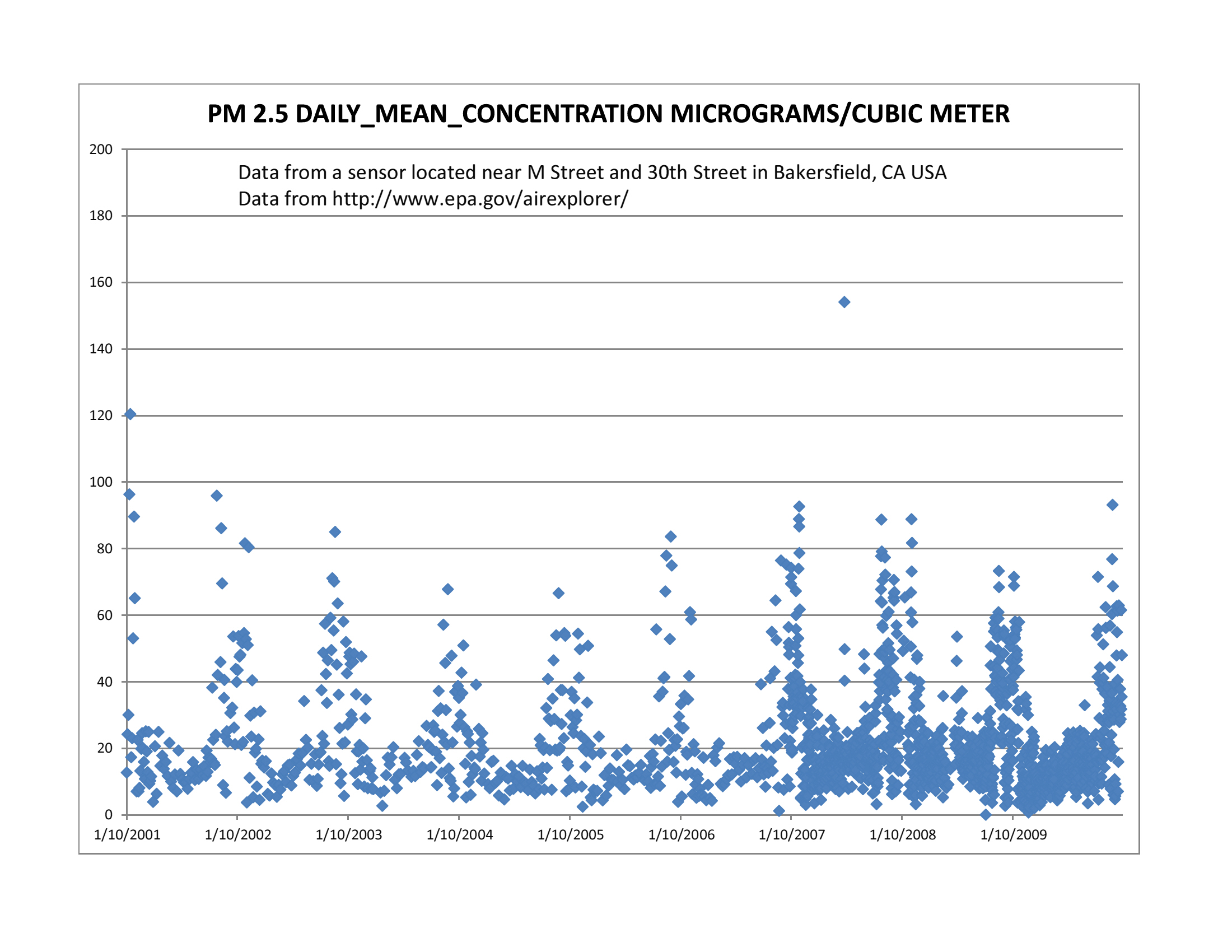
Particulate pollution in Kern County varies with the seasons.

Kern County suffers from severe air pollution. Particulates cause poor visibility, especially in the winter. Western Kern County lies in the San Joaquin Valley and the topography traps pollutants. Although the topography is not as unfavorable in eastern Kern County, it is a non-attainment area for particulates. Air pollution caused by particulates is "in the unhealthy range an average of 40 days a year, according to the American Lung Association's 2018 State of the Air Report.

=== Vegetation ===
Chaparral comprises a considerable portion of the natural area within Kern County; the species diversity within these chaparral habitats, however, is considerably less than in many other regions of California. Whitethorn is a prominent example of chaparral species on the rocky slopes of the Sierra Nevada and the Inner Coastal Ranges. California buckeye is a notable tree found in both chaparral and forests and whose southern range terminates in Kern County.

=== National protected areas ===
- Bitter Creek National Wildlife Refuge
- Carrizo Plain National Monument (part)
- César E. Chávez National Monument
- Giant Sequoia National Monument (part)
- Kern National Wildlife Refuge
- Los Padres National Forest (part)
- Sequoia National Forest (part)

== Demographics ==
Historical population
Census	Pop.	Note	%±
1870	2,925		—
1880	5,601		91.5%
1890	9,808		75.1%
1900	16,480		68.0%
1910	37,715		128.9%
1920	54,843		45.4%
1930	82,570		50.6%
1940	135,124		63.6%
1950	228,309		69.0%
1960	291,984		27.9%
1970	329,162		12.7%
1980	403,089		22.5%
1990	543,477		34.8%
2000	661,645		21.7%
2010	839,631		26.9%
2020	909,235		8.3%
2025 (est.)	927,068	▲	2.0%
U.S. Decennial Census; 1790–1960 1900–1990; 1990–2000 2010 2020

Kern County was the 11th-largest county by population in California. The center of population of California is located in Kern County, in the town of Buttonwillow.

=== 2020 census ===
As of the 2020 census, the county had a population of 909,235. The median age was 32.8 years. 28.3% of residents were under the age of 18 and 11.8% of residents were 65 years of age or older. For every 100 females there were 102.5 males, and for every 100 females age 18 and over there were 101.9 males age 18 and over.

The racial makeup of the county was 40.9% White, 5.5% Black or African American, 2.0% American Indian and Alaska Native, 5.1% Asian, 0.2% Native Hawaiian and Pacific Islander, 30.2% from some other race, and 16.1% from two or more races. Hispanic or Latino residents of any race comprised 54.9% of the population.

86.6% of residents lived in urban areas, while 13.4% lived in rural areas.

There were 281,498 households in the county, of which 42.9% had children under the age of 18 living with them and 25.5% had a female householder with no spouse or partner present. About 19.6% of all households were made up of individuals and 8.1% had someone living alone who was 65 years of age or older.

There were 301,009 housing units, of which 6.5% were vacant. Among occupied housing units, 59.2% were owner-occupied and 40.8% were renter-occupied. The homeowner vacancy rate was 1.5% and the rental vacancy rate was 4.8%.

=== Racial and ethnic composition ===
Kern County, California – Racial and ethnic composition Note: the US Census treats Hispanic/Latino as an ethnic category. This table excludes Latinos from the racial categories and assigns them to a separate category. Hispanics/Latinos may be of any race.
Race / Ethnicity (NH = Non-Hispanic)	Pop 1980	Pop 1990	Pop 2000	Pop 2010	Pop 2020	% 1980	% 1990	% 2000	% 2010	% 2020
White alone (NH)	281,132	340,892	327,190	323,794	279,600	69.74%	62.72%	49.45%	38.56%	30.75%
Black or African American alone (NH)	20,779	28,851	37,845	45,377	46,776	5.15%	5.31%	5.72%	5.40%	5.14%
Native American or Alaska Native alone (NH)	6,008	5,620	5,885	5,893	5,197	1.49%	1.03%	0.89%	0.70%	0.57%
Asian alone (NH)	7,723	14,879	21,177	33,100	44,257	1.92%	2.74%	3.20%	3.94%	4.87%
Native Hawaiian or Pacific Islander alone (NH)	x	x	728	995	1,127	0.11%	0.12%	0.11%	0.12%	0.12%
Other race alone (NH)	421	1,240	989	1,472	4,557	0.10%	0.23%	0.15%	0.18%	0.50%
Mixed race or Multiracial (NH)	x	x	13,795	15,967	28,563	x	x	2.08%	1.90%	3.14%
Hispanic or Latino (any race)	87,026	151,995	254,036	413,033	499,158	21.59%	27.97%	38.39%	49.19%	54.90%
Total	403,089	543,477	661,645	839,631	909,235	100.00%	100.00%	100.00%	100.00%	100.00%

=== American Community Survey 2025 data ===
The United States Census Bureau estimated that in 2025, Kern County’s population was 927.068. It was also estimated that the county's population was 27,86% Non-Hispanic White, 58,34% Hispanic or Latino, 4,97% Non-Hispanic Black, 5,45% Asian, 0,54% Native American, 0,12% Pacific Islander, and 2,71% Multiracial.

Total	Population	Percentage
Non-Hispanic White	258.309	27,86%
Hispanic or Latino	540.892	58,34%
Non-Hispanic Black	46.037	4,97%
Asian	50.547	5,45%
Native American	5.007	0,54%
Pacific Islander	1.122	0,12%
Non-Hispanic Multiracial	25.154	2,71%

==== Racial / Ethnic Profile of places in Kern County, California ====
Racial / Ethnic Profile of places in Kern County, California (2020 Census)
Following is a table of cities and census-designated places in Kern County. Data for the United States (with and without Puerto Rico), the state of California, and Orange County itself have been included for comparison purposes.
The majority racial/ethnic group is coded per the key below.

Majority minority with no dominant group
Majority White
Majority Black
Majority Hispanic
Majority Asian

Racial and ethnic composition of places in Kern County, California (2020 Census) (NH = Non-Hispanic) Note: the US Census treats Hispanic/Latino as an ethnic category. This table excludes Latinos from the racial categories and assigns them to a separate category. Hispanics/Latinos may be of any race.
Place	Designation	Total Population	White alone (NH)	%	Black or African American alone (NH)	%	Native American or Alaska Native alone (NH)	%	Asian alone (NH)	%	Pacific Islander alone (NH)	%	Other race alone (NH)	%	Mixed race or Multiracial (NH)	%	Hispanic or Latino (any race)	%
United States of America (50 states and D.C.)	x	331,449,281	191,697,647	57.84%	39,940,338	12.05%	2,251,699	0.68%	19,618,719	5.92%	622,018	0.19%	1,689,833	0.51%	13,548,983	4.09%	62,080,044	18.73%
United States of America (50 states, D.C., and Puerto Rico)	x	334,735,155	191,722,195	57.28%	39,944,624	11.93%	2,252,011	0.67%	19,621,465	5.86%	622,109	0.19%	1,692,341	0.51%	13,551,323	4.05%	65,329,087	19.52%
California	State	39,538,223	13,714,587	34.69%	2,119,286	5.36%	156,085	0.39%	5,978,795	15.12%	138,167	0.35%	223,929	0.57%	1,627,722	4.12%	15,579,652	39.40%
Kern County	County	909,235	279,600	30.75%	46,776	5.14%	5,197	0.57%	44,257	4.87%	1,127	0.12%	4,557	0.50%	28,563	3.14%	499,158	54.90%
Arvin	City	19,495	766	3.93%	153	0.78%	17	0.09%	97	0.50%	5	0.03%	32	0.16%	108	0.55%	18,317	93.96%
Bakersfield	City	403,455	116,311	28.83%	26,402	6.54%	2,153	0.53%	30,268	7.50%	505	0.13%	2,430	0.60%	12,564	3.11%	212,822	52.75%
California City	City	14,973	4,601	30.73%	3,385	22.61%	85	0.57%	377	2.52%	46	0.31%	96	0.64%	889	5.94%	5,494	36.69%
Delano	City	51,428	2,391	4.65%	2,695	5.24%	155	0.30%	7,079	13.76%	35	0.07%	118	0.23%	502	0.98%	38,453	74.77%
Maricopa	City	1,026	626	61.01%	13	1.27%	27	2.63%	6	0.58%	2	0.19%	0	0.00%	49	4.78%	303	29.53%
McFarland	City	14,161	421	2.97%	78	0.55%	17	0.12%	115	0.81%	3	0.02%	36	0.25%	40	0.28%	13,451	94.99%
Ridgecrest	City	27,959	16,763	59.96%	1,222	4.37%	157	0.56%	1,457	5.21%	161	0.58%	155	0.55%	1,920	6.87%	6,124	21.90%
Shafter	City	19,953	2,971	14.89%	290	1.45%	28	0.14%	236	1.18%	9	0.05%	116	0.58%	286	1.43%	16,017	80.27%
Taft	City	8,546	4,149	48.55%	133	1.56%	61	0.71%	136	1.59%	36	0.42%	19	0.22%	288	3.37%	3,724	43.58%
Tehachapi	City	12,939	6,183	47.79%	1,025	7.92%	92	0.71%	278	2.15%	21	0.16%	84	0.65%	519	4.01%	4,737	36.61%
Wasco	City	27,047	2,238	8.27%	1,428	5.28%	72	0.27%	134	0.50%	14	0.05%	43	0.16%	196	0.72%	22,922	84.75%
Alta Sierra	CDP	103	88	85.44%	0	0.00%	4	3.88%	0	0.00%	0	0.00%	0	0.00%	0	0.00%	11	10.68%
Bakersfield Country Club	CDP	1,715	793	46.24%	28	1.63%	15	0.87%	51	2.97%	1	0.06%	8	0.47%	78	4.55%	741	43.21%
Bear Valley Springs	CDP	5,592	4,430	79.22%	78	1.39%	27	0.48%	79	1.41%	1	0.02%	27	0.48%	257	4.60%	693	12.39%
Bodfish	CDP	2,008	1,602	79.78%	21	1.05%	32	1.59%	18	0.90%	2	0.10%	13	0.65%	108	5.38%	212	10.56%
Boron	CDP	2,086	1,145	54.89%	167	8.01%	28	1.34%	44	2.11%	5	0.24%	11	0.53%	108	5.18%	542	25.98%
Buttonwillow	CDP	1,337	184	13.76%	25	1.87%	9	0.67%	7	0.52%	0	0.00%	5	0.37%	20	1.50%	1,087	81.30%
Casa Loma	CDP	1,804	246	13.64%	63	3.49%	11	0.61%	6	0.33%	0	0.00%	2	0.11%	33	1.83%	1,443	79.99%
Cherokee Strip	CDP	206	33	16.02%	1	0.49%	0	0.00%	3	1.46%	0	0.00%	4	1.94%	1	0.49%	164	79.61%
China Lake Acres	CDP	1,757	1,218	69.32%	37	2.11%	29	1.65%	14	0.80%	2	0.11%	9	0.51%	121	6.89%	327	18.61%
Derby Acres	CDP	301	226	75.08%	3	1.00%	1	0.33%	3	1.00%	0	0.00%	2	0.66%	14	4.65%	52	17.28%
Di Giorgio	CDP	400	6	1.50%	0	0.00%	0	0.00%	0	0.00%	0	0.00%	0	0.00%	1	0.25%	393	98.25%
Dustin Acres	CDP	677	448	66.17%	0	0.00%	16	2.36%	3	0.44%	0	0.00%	11	1.62%	1	0.15%	160	23.63%
East Bakersfield	CDP	9,749	701	7.19%	508	5.21%	43	0.44%	45	0.46%	0	0.00%	16	0.16%	137	1.41%	8,299	85.13%
Edison	CDP	255	82	32.16%	6	2.35%	0	0.00%	3	1.18%	0	0.00%	1	0.39%	6	2.35%	157	61.57%
Edmundson Acres	CDP	296	39	13.18%	6	2.03%	5	1.69%	2	0.68%	0	0.00%	1	0.34%	12	4.05%	231	78.04%
Edwards AFB	CDP	2,135	1,210	56.67%	198	9.27%	4	0.19%	88	4.12%	23	1.08%	14	0.66%	177	8.29%	421	19.72%
El Adobe	CDP	391	85	21.74%	2	0.51%	2	0.51%	4	1.02%	0	0.00%	1	0.26%	10	2.56%	287	73.40%
Fellows	CDP	52	46	88.46%	0	0.00%	3	5.77%	0	0.00%	0	0.00%	0	0.00%	2	3.85%	1	1.92%
Ford City	CDP	4,348	1,441	33.14%	19	0.44%	11	0.25%	13	0.30%	2	0.05%	24	0.55%	102	2.35%	2,736	62.93%
Frazier Park	CDP	2,592	1,716	66.20%	19	0.73%	14	0.54%	36	1.39%	2	0.08%	11	0.42%	113	4.36%	681	26.27%
Fuller Acres	CDP	917	99	10.80%	2	0.22%	6	0.65%	2	0.22%	0	0.00%	20	2.18%	19	2.07%	769	83.86%
Glennville	CDP	158	140	88.61%	0	0.00%	6	3.80%	3	1.90%	0	0.00%	3	1.90%	2	1.27%	4	2.53%
Golden Hills	CDP	9,578	6,274	65.50%	130	1.36%	79	0.82%	129	1.35%	11	0.11%	77	0.80%	546	5.70%	2,332	24.35%
Greenacres	CDP	5,496	3,450	62.77%	74	1.35%	53	0.96%	106	1.93%	6	0.11%	26	0.47%	314	5.71%	1,467	26.69%
Greenfield	CDP	3,447	773	22.43%	76	2.20%	11	0.32%	29	0.84%	2	0.06%	10	0.29%	76	2.20%	2,470	71.66%
Inyokern	CDP	988	667	67.51%	9	0.91%	20	2.02%	27	2.73%	1	0.10%	5	0.51%	101	10.22%	158	15.99%
Johannesburg	CDP	113	89	78.76%	0	0.00%	0	0.00%	8	7.08%	0	0.00%	0	0.00%	9	7.96%	7	6.19%
Keene	CDP	469	341	72.71%	7	1.49%	5	1.07%	2	0.43%	1	0.21%	0	0.00%	22	4.69%	91	19.40%
Kernville	CDP	1,549	1,251	80.76%	9	0.58%	16	1.03%	24	1.55%	1	0.06%	9	0.58%	83	5.36%	156	10.07%
Lake Isabella	CDP	3,573	2,640	73.89%	21	0.59%	70	1.96%	36	1.01%	4	0.11%	13	0.36%	267	7.47%	522	14.61%
Lake of the Woods	CDP	790	574	72.66%	3	0.38%	9	1.14%	8	1.01%	2	0.25%	1	0.13%	31	3.92%	162	20.51%
Lamont	CDP	14,049	433	3.08%	12	0.09%	16	0.11%	46	0.33%	0	0.00%	29	0.21%	62	0.44%	13,451	95.74%
Lebec	CDP	1,239	695	56.09%	10	0.81%	4	0.32%	27	2.18%	0	0.00%	14	1.13%	53	4.28%	436	35.19%
Lost Hills	CDP	2,370	30	1.27%	5	0.21%	0	0.00%	4	0.17%	0	0.00%	5	0.21%	3	0.13%	2,323	98.02%
McKittrick	CDP	102	67	65.69%	1	0.98%	2	1.96%	0	0.00%	0	0.00%	0	0.00%	7	6.86%	25	24.51%
Mettler	CDP	90	21	23.33%	0	0.00%	1	1.11%	0	0.00%	0	0.00%	0	0.00%	4	4.44%	64	71.11%
Mexican Colony	CDP	283	18	6.36%	1	0.35%	0	0.00%	0	0.00%	0	0.00%	1	0.35%	2	0.71%	261	92.23%
Mojave	CDP	4,699	1,430	30.43%	923	19.64%	47	1.00%	71	1.51%	5	0.11%	48	1.02%	175	3.72%	2,000	42.56%
Mountain Mesa	CDP	823	664	80.68%	5	0.61%	10	1.22%	7	0.85%	1	0.12%	2	0.24%	50	6.08%	84	10.21%
Mountain Meadows	CDP	303	177	58.42%	0	0.00%	1	0.33%	6	1.98%	0	0.00%	0	0.00%	25	8.25%	94	31.02%
North Edwards	CDP	1,054	646	61.29%	68	6.45%	12	1.14%	27	2.56%	6	0.57%	4	0.38%	64	6.07%	227	21.54%
Oildale	CDP	36,135	21,384	59.18%	868	2.40%	408	1.13%	357	0.99%	33	0.09%	147	0.41%	1,836	5.08%	11,102	30.72%
Olde Stockdale	CDP	568	498	87.68%	3	0.53%	0	0.00%	10	1.76%	0	0.00%	7	1.23%	9	1.58%	41	7.22%
Old River	CDP	123	39	31.71%	0	0.00%	0	0.00%	0	0.00%	0	0.00%	3	2.44%	2	1.63%	79	64.23%
Onyx	CDP	457	339	74.18%	0	0.00%	22	4.81%	0	0.00%	0	0.00%	3	0.66%	32	7.00%	61	13.35%
Pine Mountain Club	CDP	2,422	1,768	73.00%	30	1.24%	20	0.83%	61	2.52%	3	0.12%	12	0.50%	132	5.45%	396	16.35%
Pumpkin Center	CDP	421	114	27.08%	2	0.48%	1	0.24%	9	2.14%	0	0.00%	7	1.66%	9	2.14%	279	66.27%
Randsburg	CDP	45	37	82.22%	3	6.67%	0	0.00%	1	2.22%	0	0.00%	0	0.00%	0	0.00%	4	8.89%
Rosamond	CDP	20,961	7,737	36.91%	2,068	9.87%	144	0.69%	624	2.98%	41	0.20%	101	0.48%	1,221	5.83%	9,025	43.06%
Rosedale	CDP	18,639	12,015	64.46%	325	1.74%	145	0.78%	691	3.71%	13	0.07%	113	0.61%	912	4.89%	4,425	23.74%
Smith Corner	CDP	594	48	8.08%	1	0.17%	11	1.85%	0	0.00%	0	0.00%	1	0.17%	16	2.69%	517	87.04%
South Taft	CDP	2,100	606	28.86%	8	0.38%	24	1.14%	5	0.24%	2	0.10%	3	0.14%	67	3.19%	1,385	65.95%
Squirrel Mountain Valley	CDP	760	629	82.76%	3	0.39%	28	3.68%	7	0.92%	0	0.00%	8	1.05%	35	4.61%	50	6.58%
Stallion Springs	CDP	3,139	2,334	74.35%	29	0.92%	23	0.73%	51	1.62%	2	0.06%	18	0.57%	165	5.26%	517	16.47%
Stebbins	CDP	1,423	369	25.93%	5	0.35%	3	0.21%	4	0.28%	0	0.00%	10	0.70%	30	2.11%	1,002	70.41%
Tarina	CDP	18	12	66.67%	0	0.00%	0	0.00%	1	5.56%	1	5.56%	0	0.00%	3	16.67%	1	5.56%

=== 2010 census ===
The 2010 United States census reported that Kern County had a population of 839,631. The racial makeup of Kern County was 499,766 (59.5%) White, 48,921 (5.8%) African American, 12,676 (1.5%) Native American, 34,846 (4.2%) Asian, 1,252 (0.1%) Pacific Islander, 204,314 (24.3%) from other races, and 37,856 (4.5%) from two or more races. Hispanics or Latinos of any race were 413,033 persons (49.2%); 43.4% of Kern County residents are of Mexican heritage, 1.0% Salvadoran, 0.5% Colombian, and 0.4% Guatemalan.

=== 2000 census ===
According to the 2000 United States census, 661,645 people, 208,652 households, and 156,489 families resided in the county. The population density was 81 people per square mile (31 people/km^{2}). The 231,564 housing units had an average density of 28 units per square mile (11 units/km^{2}). The racial makeup of the county was 61.6% White, 6.0% Black or African American, 3.4% Asian, 1.5% Native American, 0.2% Pacific Islander, 23.2% from other races, and 4.1% from two or more races. About 38.4% of the population were Hispanics or Latinos of any race; 8.4% were of German, 7.2% American, and 5.7% Irish ancestry, according to the census, and 66.8% spoke English, 29.1% Spanish, and 1.0% Tagalog as their first language.

Of the 208,652 households, 42.2% had children under 18 living with them, 54.6% were married couples living together, 14.5% had a female householder with no husband present, and 25.0% were not families. About 20.3% of all households were made up of individuals, and 7.8% had someone living alone who was 65 or older. The average household size was 3.03 and the average family size was 3.50.

In the county, the age distribution was 31.9% under 18, 10.2% from 18 to 24, 29.8% from 25 to 44, 18.7% from 45 to 64, and 9.4% who were 65 or older. The median age was 31 years. For every 100 females there were 105.3 males. For every 100 females age 18 and over, there were 105.3 males.

The median income for a household in the county was $35,446, and for a family was $39,403. Males had a median income of $38,097 versus $25,876 for females. The per capita income for the county was $15,760. About 16.8% of families and 20.8% of the population were below the poverty line, including 27.8% of those under 18 and 10.5% of those 65 or over.

== Arts and culture ==
Kern County is associated with the Bakersfield sound. The Buck Owens Crystal Palace is located in Bakersfield.

== Metropolitan statistical area ==
The United States Office of Management and Budget has designated Kern County as the Bakersfield, CA metropolitan statistical area. The United States Census Bureau ranked the Bakersfield, CA Metropolitan Statistical Area as the 63rd most populous metropolitan statistical area and the 68th most populous primary statistical area of the United States as of July 1, 2012.

== Government, policing, and politics ==
=== Government ===
The Government of Kern County is defined and authorized under the California Constitution, law, and the Charter of the County of Kern and is governed by an elected board of supervisors. The board consists of five members, elected by districts, who serve four-year, staggered terms. The county government provides countywide services such as elections and voter registration, some law enforcement, jails, vital records, property records, tax collection, public health, and social services. In addition, the county serves as the local government for all unincorporated areas.

=== Safety ===
==== Fire ====
Logo of the Kern County Fire Department

The Kern County Fire Department provides fire protection and emergency response services for the unincorporated areas of the county, as well as the cities of Arvin, Delano, Maricopa, McFarland, Ridgecrest, Shafter, Taft, Tehachapi and Wasco.

Bakersfield has its own fire department, the Bakersfield Fire Department.

==== Sheriff ====
The Kern County Sheriff's Office provides court protection, jail administration, and coroner services for the entire county of around 900,000 in population. It provides patrol and detective services for the unincorporated areas of the county and by contract to certain municipalities. The main sheriff's office and station is at Bakersfield, with 15 sheriff substations for the widespread county.

==== Municipal police ====
Municipal police departments in the county are Bakersfield, population 384,000; Delano, 54,000; Ridgecrest, 29,000; Wasco, 28,000; Arvin, 21,000; Shafter, 20,000; McFarland, 15,000; California City, 14,671; Tehachapi, 13,000; Taft, 9,327; and Maricopa (sheriff contract city), 1,200.

=== Politics and voter registration ===
Population and registered voters
Total population	909,235	
Registered voters (Note: Percentage of registered voters with respect to total population. Percentages of party members with respect to registered voters follow.)	426,481	46.9%
Democratic	148,701	34.9%
Republican	154,612	36.3%
Democratic–Republican spread	-5,911	-1.4%
American Independent	18,938	3.3%
Green	1,343	0.2%
Libertarian	5,510	0.6%
Peace and Freedom	3,073	0.3%
Americans Elect	12	0.0%
Other	6,947	0.1%
No party preference	87,357	18.8%

==== Cities by population and voter registration ====
Cities by population and voter registration
City	Population	Registered voters	Democratic	Republican	D–R spread	Other	No party preference
Arvin	19,495	30.1%	55.6%	13.2%	+42.4%	6.8%	24.4%
Bakersfield	403,455	50.9%	36.6%	34.5%	+2.1%	8.0%	20.9%
California City	14,973	44.1%	35.9%	32.2%	+3.7%	10.4%	21.5%
Delano	51,428	32.7%	53.6%	16.6%	+37.0%	7.0%	22.8%
Maricopa	1,100	44.5%	13.7%	62.2%	-48.5%	10.4%	13.7%
McFarland	14,161	28.0%	52.3%	17.7%	+36.6%	6.2%	23.8%
Ridgecrest	27,959	56.7%	23.6%	45.1%	-21.5%	10.3%	21.0%
Shafter	19,953	44.8%	40.7%	31.2%	+9.5%	6.9%	21.2%
Taft	8,546	39.4%	14.9%	58.4%	-43.5%	9.6%	17.1%
Tehachapi	12,939	38.9%	22.4%	46.4%	-24.0%	10.4%	20.8%
Wasco	25,457	30.4%	45.3%	23.5%	+21.8%	7.6%	23.6%

=== Federal ===
Kern is a strongly Republican county in Presidential and congressional elections. The last Democratic candidate for president to win a majority in the county was Lyndon Johnson in 1964. The county is also a Republican stronghold at the state level; until Xavier Becerra won the county in 2026 the last Democrat to win the county in a gubernatorial election was Jerry Brown in 1978. Kern remains the only county in Southern California that consistently votes Republican in recent elections. While Republican margins in the county had been shrinking, with Donald Trump's 10.2% margin of victory in 2020 being the smallest since Gerald Ford's 6.7% majority in 1976, Trump regained his margins in 2024 and even surpassed previous performances, with his 21% margin being the best since George Bush in 2004. Some constituencies in Kern County in particular some of the most widely contested in California, and the United States as of the early 2020s, with the 2022 race for the 22nd US House district being close, and the 26th Senate District having one of the tightest margins in electoral history, with incumbent Democrat Melissa Hurtado retaining her seat by 13 votes.

Democratic strength is concentrated in the small agricultural towns in the San Joaquin Valley portion of the county, such as Arvin, Delano, McFarland, Shafter, and Wasco. Unincorporated communities close to agricultural areas, such as Lamont and Lost Hills, are Democratic strongholds. The eastern and southern parts of Bakersfield, along with unincorporated East Bakersfield, have also become reliably Democratic. Republican strength is found in the foothill, mountain, and high desert communities of the county. The cities of Maricopa, Ridgecrest, Taft, and Tehachapi are Republican strongholds. Along with the northern parts of Bakersfield, the wealthy unincorporated area of Rosedale and working-class Oildale are also seen as being strongly Republican. Cities including California City and the western areas of Bakersfield are seen as competitive in most elections. Bakersfield as a whole is seen as being competitive with a Republican lean. The rest of the unincorporated areas of Kern County is seen as strongly Republican.

United States presidential election results for Kern County, California
Year	Republican		Democratic		Third party(ies)	
Year	No.	%	No.	%	No.	%
1880	463	40.94%	661	58.44%	7	0.62%
1884	598	42.02%	798	56.08%	27	1.90%
1888	910	41.46%	1,229	55.99%	56	2.55%
1892	992	39.47%	1,266	50.38%	255	10.15%
1896	1,430	43.80%	1,763	54.00%	72	2.21%
1900	1,692	45.17%	1,960	52.32%	94	2.51%
1904	2,359	51.61%	1,724	37.72%	488	10.68%
1908	2,270	45.60%	2,215	44.50%	493	9.90%
1912	67	0.62%	5,569	51.73%	5,129	47.65%
1916	5,611	35.11%	9,566	59.86%	804	5.03%
1920	7,079	49.01%	6,095	42.20%	1,270	8.79%
1924	8,646	46.08%	3,159	16.84%	6,958	37.08%
1928	14,692	62.67%	8,541	36.43%	212	0.90%
1932	7,011	25.11%	19,634	70.32%	1,275	4.57%
1936	8,345	24.20%	25,726	74.61%	408	1.18%
1940	19,445	37.30%	32,202	61.78%	479	0.92%
1944	20,730	43.96%	26,205	55.56%	226	0.48%
1948	24,464	41.60%	33,029	56.16%	1,318	2.24%
1952	46,497	55.13%	37,240	44.16%	602	0.71%
1956	46,220	51.31%	43,533	48.33%	322	0.36%
1960	52,800	50.43%	51,440	49.13%	465	0.44%
1964	45,014	41.18%	64,174	58.71%	120	0.11%
1968	53,990	46.61%	49,284	42.55%	12,558	10.84%
1972	71,686	60.14%	41,937	35.18%	5,570	4.67%
1976	58,023	52.29%	50,567	45.57%	2,371	2.14%
1980	72,842	59.65%	41,097	33.65%	8,182	6.70%
1984	94,776	65.03%	49,567	34.01%	1,401	0.96%
1988	90,550	61.48%	55,083	37.40%	1,660	1.13%
1992	80,762	45.05%	60,510	33.75%	37,991	21.19%
1996	92,151	53.77%	62,658	36.56%	16,582	9.67%
2000	110,663	60.70%	66,003	36.20%	5,642	3.09%
2004	140,417	66.49%	68,603	32.49%	2,154	1.02%
2008	134,793	57.89%	93,457	40.14%	4,600	1.98%
2012	126,618	57.17%	89,495	40.41%	5,359	2.42%
2016	129,584	53.07%	98,689	40.42%	15,890	6.51%
2020	164,484	53.88%	133,366	43.68%	7,442	2.44%
2024	167,879	59.26%	108,241	38.21%	7,164	2.53%

In the United States House of Representatives, Kern County is split between California's 20th congressional district, represented by Republican Vince Fong, California's 22nd congressional district, represented by Republican David Valadao, and California's 23rd congressional district, represented by Republican Jay Obernolte.

=== State ===
In the State Assembly, Kern County is split between the following three Assembly districts:

- the 32nd Assembly district, represented by Republican Stan Ellis
- the 34th Assembly district, represented by Republican Tom Lackey, and
- the 35th Assembly district, represented by Democrat Jasmeet Bains.

In the State Senate, Kern County is split between the 12th senatorial district, represented by Republican Shannon Grove, and the 16th senatorial district, represented by Democrat Melissa Hurtado.

On November 4, 2008, Kern County voted 75.29% in favor of Proposition 8, which amended the California Constitution to ban same-sex marriages.

=== County ===
Kern County is governed by a five-member Board of Supervisors. Philip Peters of District 1 currently serves as chair. As of December 17, 2024, they are:

- District 1, Philip Peters.
- District 2, Chris Parlier
- District 3, Jeff Flores.
- District 4, David Couch.
- District 5, Leticia Perez.

== Crime and public safety ==
Fire protection within the county is provided by the Kern County Fire Department. Law enforcement within the county is provided by the Kern County Sheriff's Department.

=== Fire ===
The Kern County Fire Department (KCFD) is an agency that provides fire protection and emergency medical services for the county of Kern, California, USA. Over 625 permanent employees and 100 extra help employees protect an area which spans over 8,000 square miles (21,000 km^{2}). KCFD provides fire protection services for over 500,000 citizens living in the unincorporated areas of Kern County and the cities of Arvin, Delano, Maricopa, McFarland, Ridgecrest, Shafter, Taft, Tehachapi and Wasco. This agency is contracted to provide dispatch services for the California City Fire Department. Over 546 uniformed firefighters are stationed in 46 fire stations throughout the county.

=== Sheriff's Office ===
The Kern County Sheriff's Department is the agency responsible for law enforcement within the county of Kern. The department provides law enforcement within the county, maintains the jails used by both the county and municipal cities, and provides search and rescue. The department contains over 1,200 sworn deputies and civilian employees. Its jurisdiction contains all of the unincorporated areas of Kern County, approximately 8,000 square miles (21,000 km^{2}). The department headquarters is located at 1350 Norris Road in Bakersfield. There are 15 additional substations located throughout the county. The metro patrol area is divided into four regions: north, south, east, and west.

In 2009, the district attorney claimed "the highest per capita prison commitment rate of any major California county." Kern County contains multiple state and federal prisons, including two private prisons. The county is among the most prolific with the death penalty, assigning death penalty sentences in 26 cases since 1976. In 2015 Kern County policemen from all departments killed more people per capita than any other American county. Because of the very harsh local criminal justice system, Kern County has been dubbed "the most punitive authoritarian jurisdiction on the west coast" and "Oklahoma of the west". In 2015, it was revealed that the Kern County Sheriff's office engaged in a longstanding program of attempted cash payoffs to women who had accused deputies of sexual assault. In the same year, a civil lawsuit filed by a survivor of a sexual assault committed by Kern County Sheriff's deputy Gabriel Lopez was settled for $1 million.

Kern County had the most deaths per capita in the US by police shooting per an article published in The Guardian on December 1, 2015. In 2015 to the date of publication of the article, there have been 13 deaths by police shootings in a county of less than 875,000 population, or 0.016 per thousand persons. By comparison, during the same period of time in New York City, a population 10 times the size with a police force more than 20 times the size, there were 9 such deaths.

The following table includes the number of incidents reported and the rate per 1,000 persons for each type of offense.

Population and crime rates
Population	829,254	
Violent crime	4,892	5.90
Homicide	75	0.09
Forcible rape	205	0.25
Robbery	1,331	1.61
Aggravated assault	3,281	3.96
Property crime	20,147	24.30
Burglary	9,413	11.35
Larceny-theft	17,034	20.54
Motor vehicle theft	4,998	6.03
Arson	593	0.72

=== Cities by population and crime rates ===
Cities by population and crime rates
City	Population	Violent crimes	Violent crime rate per 1,000 persons	Property crimes	Property crime rate per 1,000 persons
Arvin	19,761	165	8.35	671	33.96
Bakersfield	355,696	1,929	5.42	17,754	49.91
Bear Valley	5,282	1	0.19	92	17.42
California City	14,460	90	6.22	517	35.75
Delano	54,318	274	5.04	1,437	26.46
McFarland	13,010	57	4.38	218	16.76
Ridgecrest	28,273	108	3.82	602	21.29
Shafter	17,391	49	2.82	576	33.12
Stallion Springs	2,540	6	2.36	9	3.54
Taft	9,552	54	5.65	365	38.21
Tehachapi	14,766	59	4.00	472	31.97

== Economy ==
The county has a large agricultural base and is a significant producer of oil, natural gas, hydro-electric power, Biomass, solar power, and wind power. Kern is noted for minerals, including gold, borate, and kernite. The largest open pit mine in California, which mines borax, is at Boron. As of October 1, 2016, Kern County contains nearly 25% of California's in-state renewable energy production, including 1,785 MW of solar power and 3,310 MW of wind power. Kern County is home to the Tehachapi Energy Storage Project, which was commissioned in 2014.

=== Aerospace and military ===
Department of Defense facilities include Edwards Air Force Base and China Lake Naval Air Weapons Station. As home to Edwards Air Force Base the Air Force's main flight test facility, Kern has been the site of many milestones, including the first supersonic flight and the first landing of the Space Shuttle. The base has brought prosperity to the railroad towns of Mojave and Rosamond. Kern County is also the home of the first inland spaceport in the United States, the Mojave Spaceport.

=== Agriculture ===
Agriculture has long been one of the county's biggest industries. Between 2012 and 2013 the produced value of agricultural products increased 6%, to a total of $6.8 billion. Grape constituted 31%, almond 17%, milk 13%, citrus 11%, cattle and calves and pistachio both 7%, carrots only 6% (but 80% of carrots produced in the entire United States), hay 4%, and cotton and potatoes both 2%. This is one of the highest-producing locations in the United States for vegetables, and also for watermelons. Vegetables are estimated to total $320 million every year. There are about 1,938 farms, at an average size of 1,202 acres (486 ha) (however 41% are smaller than 50 acres (20 ha)), being the primary employment of 63% of operators.

Kern County is a major producer of almonds with production greater than 100 million pounds (45,000 t; 50,000 short tons) annually. That is third of all the counties, 16% of the state's production. (See also almond in California.)

Pistachio is another important employer in the county. The Michailides & Avenot group finds severe boscalid resistance in isolates of Alternaria alternata pathogenic on pistachio here. They find extensive such resistance in a swathe from the center down into the central southern part of the state, but especially here. (See also Pistachio in California and boscalid in California.)

The Glassy-Winged Sharpshooter (Homalodisca vitripennis) is a major insect pest in the county, including in Kern County's citrus groves. (See also Glassy-Winged Sharpshooter in California.)

=== Petroleum ===
As of 2015, Kern is California's top oil-producing county, with 78% of the state's 56,653 active oil wells and 71% of oil production. The county produced 144.5 million barrels of oil in 2015, accounting for about 4% of overall U.S. oil production.

==== Discovery and development ====
Oil development began with the 1894 discovery of the Midway-Sunset Oil Field, now the third-largest in the United States, in the southwestern portion of Kern County near Maricopa. The 1899 discovery along the Kern River was a breakthrough in oil production. Oil was refined here even before the establishment of the county. The Buena Vista Petroleum Company was organized and incorporated in 1864. Soon thereafter a refinery was built that operated until April 1867 when work ceased because of high freight charges.

The 1910 Lakeview Gusher was the largest recorded oil strike in U.S. history. The well spewed approximately nine million barrels for 18 months before workers finally were able to cap it.

Other big oil fields in southwestern Kern County discovered early in the 20th century include the Buena Vista, the South Belridge and the Cymric fields. The latter is the fastest-growing field in California in terms of barrels produced per year. Later large fields include the Kern River Oil Field, the fifth-largest in the U.S., the adjacent Kern Front Oil Field, the Mount Poso Oil Field in the lower foothills of the Sierra north-northeast of Bakersfield and the Fruitvale Oil Field, which underlies much of the city of Bakersfield, along and north of the Kern River.

On July 22, 2009, Occidental Petroleum announced it had discovered the equivalent of 150 million to 250 million barrels of oil in Kern County, which the company called the largest oil discovery in California in 35 years. The find added about 10 percent to California's known reserves. Occidental's Ray Irani said it is likely that more oil would be found in the areas outside the initial six wells that tapped the discovery. Occidental has not revealed the exact location of the find, two-thirds of which is natural gas. BNET, an industry web publication, said the find would add to the company's 708 million barrels of proven reserves in California.

==== Petroleum today ====
The county today contributes more than three-quarters of all the oil produced onshore in California. Some of the large oil fields in Kern County which are still active include:

- Buena Vista Oil Field
- Cymric Oil Field
- Edison Oil Field
- Elk Hills Oil Field
- Fruitvale Oil Field
- Kern Front Oil Field
- Kern River Oil Field
- Lost Hills Oil Field
- McKittrick Oil Field
- Midway-Sunset Oil Field
- Mountain View Oil Field
- Mount Poso Oil Field
- North Belridge Oil Field
- Round Mountain Oil Field
- South Belridge Oil Field

== Transportation ==
=== Major highways ===
- I-5
- US 395
- SR 14 – former US 6
- SR 33
- SR 41
- SR 43
- SR 46
- SR 58
- SR 65
- SR 99 – former US 99
  - SR 99 Bus.
- SR 119
- SR 155
- SR 166
- SR 178
- SR 184
- SR 202
- SR 204
- SR 223

=== Public transportation ===
- Arvin Transit is the local municipal bus operator in and around Arvin.
- Delano Area Rapid Transit is the local municipal bus operator in Delano.
- Golden Empire Transit is the local bus operator in and near Bakersfield.
- Kern Transit provides countywide intercity bus service, including connections to Lancaster.
- Taft Area Transit is the local municipal bus operator in and around Taft.
- Kern County is also served by Greyhound, FlixBus, and Orange Belt Stages buses and Amtrak trains, based at Bakersfield station.

=== Airports ===
Meadows Field is the only airport in the county served by scheduled commercial passenger flights.

- California City Municipal Airport, California City. (FAA: L71)
- Delano Municipal Airport, Delano. (IATA: DLO)
- Inyokern Airport, Inyokern. (IATA: IYK)
- Kern Valley Airport, Kernville. (FAA: L05)
- Lost Hills Airport, Lost Hills. (FAA: L84)
- Meadows Field, Bakersfield, an international and general aviation airport. (IATA: BFL)
- Mojave Airport, Mojave. (IATA: MHV)
- Shafter Airport (Minter Field), Shafter. (IATA: MIT)
- Taft Airport, Taft. (FAA: L17)
- Tehachapi Municipal Airport, Tehachapi. (IATA: TSP)
- Wasco Airport, Wasco. (FAA: L19)

== Recreation ==
Outdoor recreational activities include horseback riding and water skiing (Lake Isabella, Lake Buena Vista, Lake Ming, and private ski ranches). Off-roading and other motorsports take place at Jawbone Canyon, California City, Randsburg, Willow Springs, Buttonwillow, Bakersfield Speedway, Famoso Raceway, and the half-mile Kevin Harvick's Kern Raceway. Hunting, paintball, white-water rafting, kayaking (Kern River), snow skiing (Shirley Meadows and Mount Pinos), shooting ranges (5 Dogs Range), hiking, biking (trails, paths, and roads), camping and fishing are also part of the recreational culture.

== Media ==
=== Magazines ===
- Bakersfield Life Magazine, Kern County
- Bakersfield Magazine, Kern County
- Kern County Family Magazine, Kern County

=== Newspapers ===
- The Bakersfield Californian, Kern County
- Mountain Enterprise, southwest Kern mountains area
- Mojave Desert News, California City and east Kern desert area
- The Daily Independent, Ridgecrest, China Lake, and The Indian Wells Valley
- The Kern Valley Sun, Kern Valley area
- Kern River Courier, Kern Valley area
- Tehachapi News, Tehachapi
- Taft Midway Driller, Taft
- Taft Independent, Taft
- The Delano Record, Delano

=== TV stations ===
Kern County is served by stations based in Bakersfield, including:

- KABE-CD (Univision)
- KBAK-TV (CBS)
- KBFX-TV (FOX)
- KERO-TV (ABC)
- KGET-TV (NBC/CW)
- KKEY-LD (Telemundo)

California City, Ridgecrest, and other areas in the Mojave Desert regions of eastern Kern County may instead receive Los Angeles stations.

== Communities ==
=== Cities ===
- Arvin
- Bakersfield (county seat)
- California City
- Delano
- Maricopa
- McFarland
- Ridgecrest
- Shafter
- Taft
- Tehachapi
- Wasco

=== Census-designated places ===
- Alta Sierra
- Bakersfield Country Club
- Bear Valley Springs
- Bodfish
- Boron
- Buttonwillow
- Casa Loma
- Cherokee Strip
- China Lake Acres
- Derby Acres
- Di Giorgio
- Dustin Acres
- East Bakersfield
- Edison
- Edmundson Acres
- Edwards AFB
- El Adobe
- Fellows
- Ford City
- Frazier Park
- Fuller Acres
- Glennville
- Golden Hills
- Greenacres
- Greenfield
- Inyokern
- Johannesburg
- Keene
- Kernville
- Lake Isabella
- Lake of the Woods
- Lamont
- Lebec
- Lost Hills
- McKittrick
- Mettler
- Mexican Colony
- Mojave
- Mountain Mesa
- Mountain Meadows
- North Edwards
- Oildale
- Olde Stockdale
- Old River
- Onyx
- Pine Mountain Club
- Pumpkin Center
- Randsburg
- Rosamond
- Rosedale
- Smith Corner
- South Taft
- Squirrel Mountain Valley
- Stallion Springs
- Stebbins
- Tarina
- Taft Heights
- Tupman
- Valley Acres
- Weedpatch
- Weldon
- Wofford Heights
- Woody

=== Unincorporated communities ===
- Actis
- Aerial Acres
- Bealville
- Bena
- Caliente
- Canebrake
- Cantil
- Cawelo
- Claraville
- Edwards
- Famoso
- Grapevine
- Gypsite
- Havilah
- Indian Wells
- Keyesville
- Loraine
- Midoil
- Miracle Hot Springs
- Missouri Triangle
- Monolith
- Old Garlock
- Old West Ranch
- Panama
- Pentland
- Pond
- Reward
- Rio Bravo
- Riverkern
- Sageland
- Saltdale
- Sand Canyon
- South Lake
- Spicer City
- Twin Oaks
- Wheeler Ridge
- Willow Springs
- Wonder Acres

=== Former places ===
- Adobe Station
- Glenburn

=== Population ranking ===
The population ranking of the following table is based on the 2020 census of Kern County.

† county seat

Rank	City/Town/etc.	Municipal type	Population (2020 Census)
1	† Bakersfield	City	403,455
2	Delano	City	51,428
3	Oildale	CDP	36,135
4	Ridgecrest	City	27,959
5	Wasco	City	27,047
6	Rosamond	CDP	20,961
7	Shafter	City	19,953
8	Arvin	City	19,495
9	Rosedale	CDP	18,639
10	California City	City	14,973
11	McFarland	City	14,161
12	Lamont	CDP	14,049
13	Tehachapi	City	12,939
14	Golden Hills	CDP	9,578
15	Taft	City	8,546
16	Bear Valley Springs	CDP	5,592
17	Greenacres	CDP	5,496
18	Mojave	CDP	4,699
19	Ford City	CDP	4,348
20	Lake Isabella	CDP	3,573
21	Greenfield	CDP	3,447
22	Stallion Springs	CDP	3,139
23	Frazier Park	CDP	2,592
24	Pine Mountain Club	CDP	2,422
25	Lost Hills	CDP	2,370
26	Weldon	CDP	2,303
27	Wofford Heights	CDP	2,213
28	Weedpatch	CDP	2,206
29	Edwards AFB	CDP	2,135
30	South Taft	CDP	2,100
31	Boron	CDP	2,086
32	Bodfish	CDP	2,008
33	Taft Heights	CDP	1,999
34	China Lake Acres	CDP	1,757
35	Kernville	CDP	1,549
36	Buttonwillow	CDP	1,337
37	Lebec	CDP	1,239
38	North Edwards	CDP	1,054
39	Maricopa	City	1,026
40	Inyokern	CDP	988
41	Fuller Acres	CDP	917
42	Mountain Mesa	CDP	823
43	Lake of the Woods	CDP	790
44	Squirrel Mountain Valley	CDP	760
45	Dustin Acres	CDP	677
46	Smith Corner	CDP	594
47	Valley Acres	CDP	504
48	Keene	CDP	469
49	Onyx	CDP	457
50	Derby Acres	CDP	301
51	Edmundson Acres	CDP	296
52	Mexican Colony	CDP	283
53	Cherokee Strip	CDP	206
54	Tupman	CDP	177
55	Johannesburg	CDP	113
56	McKittrick	CDP	102
57	Mettler	CDP	90
58	Fellows	CDP	52
59	Randsburg	CDP	45

== Education ==
School districts include:

Unified:

- El Tejon Unified School District
- Maricopa Unified School District
- McFarland Unified School District
- Mojave Unified School District
- Muroc Joint Unified School District
- Sierra Sands Unified School District
- Southern Kern Unified School District
- Tehachapi Unified School District

Secondary:

- Delano Joint Union High School District
- Kern High School District
- Taft Union High School District
- Wasco Union High School District

Elementary:

- Arvin Union School District
- Bakersfield City School District
- Beardsley Elementary School District
- Belridge Elementary School District
- Blake Elementary School District
- Buttonwillow Union Elementary School District
- Caliente Union Elementary School District
- Delano Union Elementary School District
- Di Giorgio Elementary School District
- Edison Elementary School District
- Elk Hills Elementary School District
- Fairfax Elementary School District
- Fruitvale Elementary School District
- General Shafter Elementary School District
- Greenfield Union School District
- Kernville Union Elementary School District
- Lakeside Union School District
- Lamont Elementary School District
- Linns Valley-Poso Flat Union School District
- Lost Hills Union Elementary School District
- Maple Elementary School District
- McKittrick Elementary School District
- Midway Elementary School District
- Norris Elementary School District
- Panama-Buena Vista School District
- Pond Union Elementary School District
- Richland Union School District
- Rio Bravo-Greeley Union Elementary School District
- Rosedale Union Elementary School District
- Semitropic Elementary School District
- South Fork Union School District
- Standard Elementary School District
- Taft City School District
- Vineland Elementary School District
- Wasco Union Elementary School District

== In popular culture ==
The 2015 Disney film McFarland, USA, starring Kevin Costner, is based on the cross-country team in the city of McFarland, California, which is located in northern Kern County.

== See also ==
- List of museums in the San Joaquin Valley
- National Register of Historic Places listings in Kern County, California
- 2024 Kern County wildfires
