= Sageland, California =

Unincorporated community in California, United States

Sageland
- Unincorporated community
- Location in California Sageland (the United States)
- Coordinates: 35°28′48″N 118°12′45″W
- Country: United States
- State: California
- County: Kern County
- Elevation: 4,026 ft (1,227 m)

Sageland (formerly, El Dorado Camp) is an unincorporated community in Kern County, California, United States. It is located near Kelso Creek, 3.5 miles (5.6 km) west-northwest at the base of the Piute Mountains, at an elevation of 4,026 feet (1,227 m).

Quartz was discovered in the area in 1866 by miners from nearby Claraville. The New El Dorado Mining District was formed that year; the first mining settlement, El Dorado Camp, was renamed Sageland in 1867. By the spring of 1868, Sageland had become a boomtown with a population of almost a thousand, complete with multiple saloons, a billiard room, hotel, two stage lines to Havilah, and an opera house. Later that year, a silver rush occurred in White Pine County, Nevada, attracting legions of miners from Sageland and other California boom towns, an exodus known as 'White Pine Fever'. The St. John Mine closed in 1875.

The area was the site of a large village of Kawaiisu Indians. They were frequently accused of cattle rustling by white settlers, who would often retaliate mercilessly. Cup holes and pictographs are present in the vicinity.
