= Rio Bravo, California =

Unincorporated community in California, United States

Rio Bravo
- Unincorporated community
- Location in California Rio Bravo (the United States)
- Coordinates: 35°23′53″N 119°17′27″W
- Country: United States
- State: California
- County: Kern
- Elevation: 318 ft (97 m)

Rio Bravo (Spanish: Río Bravo meaning "Fierce River") is an unincorporated community in Kern County, California, United States. It is located on the Southern Pacific Railroad, 7.25 miles (12 km) south of Shafter, at an elevation of 318 feet (97 m).

A post office operated at Rio Bravo from 1912 to 1919.
