= Buena Vista County, California =

Planned county in California (1855–1859)

Buena Vista County was a failed attempt to create a county from the territory of Tulare County, California, between 1855 and 1859.

III—BUENA VISTA COUNTY

This county, created by the Act of the Legislature, passed April 30, 1855, comprises that portion of Tulare County situated south of the township line, dividing townships number twenty and twenty-one south. This county is attached to the Thirteenth Judicial District; for election purposes, it forms part of the Sixth Senatorial District and with Tulare County, elect one member of the Assembly. The provisions of the Act organizing the county have been extended to the year one thousand eight hundred and fifty-nine. —Act of the Legislature, March 3, 1858.

It was the predecessor of Kern County which was successfully organized in 1866.
