= Mexican Colony, California =

Mexican Colony Spanish: Colonia Mexicana
- Census-designated place
- Location in Kern County and the state of California

- Location in California
- Coordinates: 35°28′08″N 119°16′07″W
- Country: United States
- State: California
- County: Kern

Area
  - Total: 0.032 sq mi (0.082 km^{2})
  - Land: 0.032 sq mi (0.082 km^{2})
  - Water: 0 sq mi (0 km^{2}) 0%
- Elevation: 331 ft (101 m)

Population (2020)
  - Total: 283
  - Density: 8,900/sq mi (3,500/km^{2})
- Time zone: UTC-8 (Pacific (PST))
  - Summer (DST): UTC-7 (PDT)
- ZIP code: 93263
- Area code: 661
- GNIS feature IDs: 1661019; 2629763

Mexican Colony (Spanish: La Colonia Mexicana de Shafter or simply Colonia Mexicana) is a census-designated place in Kern County, California, United States. It is located 2 miles (3.2 km) south of Shafter, at an elevation of 331 feet (101 m). The population was 283 at the 2020 census.

== Demographics ==
Historical population
| Census | Pop. | Note | %± |
|---|---|---|---|
| 2010 | 281 | | — |
| 2020 | 283 | | 0.7% |
U.S. Decennial Census; 1860–1870 1880-1890; 1900 1910 1920; 1930 1940 1950; 1960 1970 1980; 1990 2000 2010; 2020

Mexican Colony first appeared as a census designated place in the 2010 U.S. census.

Mexican Colony CDP, California – Racial and ethnic composition Note: the US Census treats Hispanic/Latino as an ethnic category. This table excludes Latinos from the racial categories and assigns them to a separate category. Hispanics/Latinos may be of any race.
| Race / Ethnicity (NH = Non-Hispanic) | Pop 2010 | Pop 2020 | % 2010 | % 2020 |
|---|---|---|---|---|
| White alone (NH) | 40 | 18 | 14.23% | 6.36% |
| Black or African American alone (NH) | 0 | 1 | 0.00% | 0.35% |
| Native American or Alaska Native alone (NH) | 10 | 0 | 3.56% | 0.00% |
| Asian alone (NH) | 0 | 0 | 0.00% | 0.00% |
| Native Hawaiian or Pacific Islander alone (NH) | 0 | 0 | 0.00% | 0.00% |
| Other race alone (NH) | 0 | 1 | 0.00% | 0.35% |
| Mixed race or Multiracial (NH) | 4 | 2 | 1.42% | 0.71% |
| Hispanic or Latino (any race) | 227 | 261 | 80.78% | 92.23% |
| Total | 281 | 283 | 100.00% | 100.00% |

The 2020 United States census reported that Mexican Colony had a population of 283. The population density was 8,843.8 inhabitants per square mile (3,414.6/km^{2}). The racial makeup of Mexican Colony was 62 (21.9%) White, 1 (0.4%) African American, 16 (5.7%) Native American, 2 (0.7%) Asian, 0 (0.0%) Pacific Islander, 152 (53.7%) from other races, and 50 (17.7%) from two or more races. Hispanic or Latino of any race were 261 persons (92.2%).

The whole population lived in households. There were 72 households, out of which 37 (51.4%) had children under the age of 18 living in them, 34 (47.2%) were married-couple households, 12 (16.7%) were cohabiting couple households, 6 (8.3%) had a female householder with no partner present, and 20 (27.8%) had a male householder with no partner present. 15 households (20.8%) were one person, and 4 (5.6%) were one person aged 65 or older. The average household size was 3.93. There were 52 families (72.2% of all households).

The age distribution was 107 people (37.8%) under the age of 18, 38 people (13.4%) aged 18 to 24, 55 people (19.4%) aged 25 to 44, 62 people (21.9%) aged 45 to 64, and 21 people (7.4%) who were 65 years of age or older. The median age was 23.6 years. For every 100 females, there were 122.8 males.

There were 73 housing units at an average density of 2,281.2 units per square mile (880.8 units/km^{2}), of which 72 (98.6%) were occupied. Of these, 17 (23.6%) were owner-occupied, and 55 (76.4%) were occupied by renters.
