= Elk Hills School District =

School district in California, United States

Address
- 501 Kern Street Tupman, California, 93276; United States

District information
- Type: Public
- Grades: K–8
- NCES District ID: 0612360

Students and staff
- Students: 171
- Teachers: 9.0 (FTE)
- Staff: 12.0 (FTE)
- Student–teacher ratio: 19.0:1

Other information
- Website: www.elkhills.k12.ca.us

Elk Hills Elementary School District is a public school district based in Kern County, California.
