= Spicer City, California =

Unincorporated community in California, United States

Spicer City
- Unincorporated community
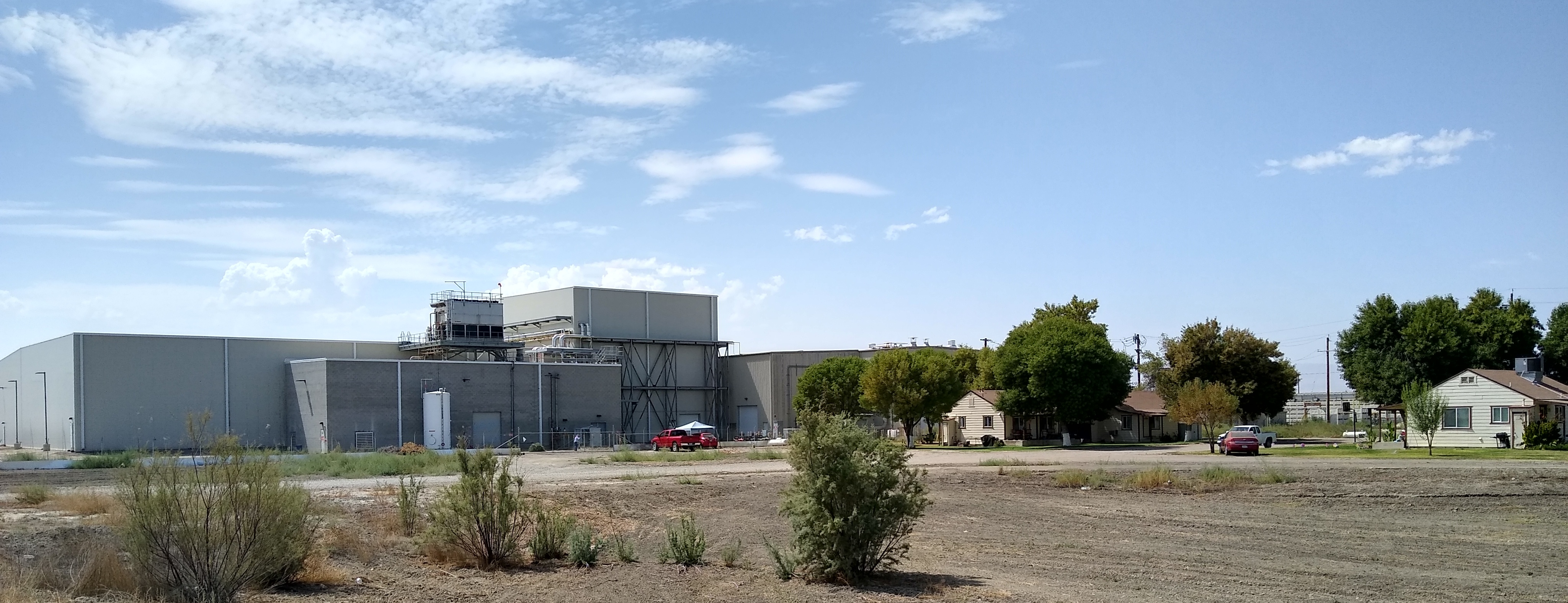

- Location in California Spicer City (the United States)
- Coordinates: 35°30′04″N 119°36′16″W
- Country: United States
- State: California
- County: Kern
- Elevation: 246 ft (75 m)

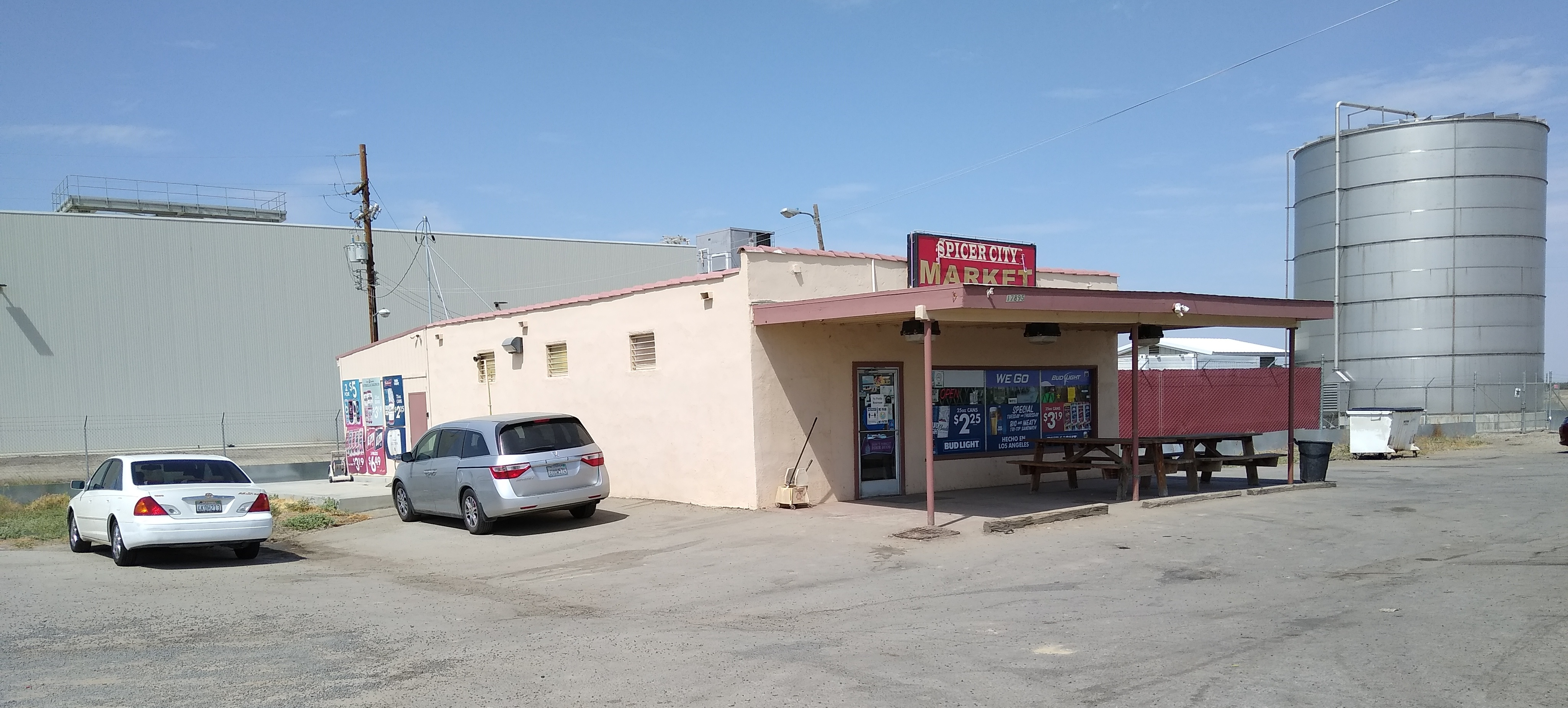
Spicer City Market

Spicer City is an unincorporated community in Kern County, California, United States. It is located 9 miles (14 km) south-southeast of Lost Hills, at an elevation of 246 feet (75 m).
