= Fairfax School District =

School district in California

Address
- 1500 South Fairfax Road Bakersfield, California, 93307; United States

District information
- Type: Public school district
- Motto: Empowering Students to Succeed
- Grades: K–8
- Established: 1891
- Superintendent: Lora Brown
- Schools: 4
- NCES District ID: 0613290

Students and staff
- Students: 2,703 (2020–2021)
- Teachers: 114.0 (FTE)
- Staff: 133.93 (FTE)
- Student–teacher ratio: 23.71:1

Other information
- Schedule: August–May
- Website: www.fairfax.k12.ca.us

Fairfax School District is a public school district in unincorporated Kern County, California, just outside of Bakersfield. It was formed May 6, 1891. The district is made up of four schools teaching kindergarten through eighth grade.

== Schools ==
=== Junior High ===
- Fairfax Junior High

=== Elementary ===
- Shirley Lane Elementary
- Virginia Avenue Elementary
- Zephyr Lane Elementary

== History ==
In 1891-1892, the district's first year, the average daily attendance was 8 pupils. The school was destroyed by fire in 1929, right after Christmas vacation. Approximately 100 pupils and 3 teachers had just gathered on the first day back at school when the fire broke out. The cause of the fire was traced to a defective brick chimney resulting from a dynamite blast set off nearby in oil exploration activity.

Fairfax Cafeteria service dates back to 1928 when Mrs. Rench, one of the founders of the Fairfax PTA began cooking food for children's lunches in her home and transporting them to the school in kettles. Fairfax remained a small rural school until the late 1930s when it tripled in size going from an average daily attendance of 102 in 1934-35 to 312 in 1938-39. This rapid growth came as a result of many farm laborers coming into the area during the depression years. At times the student population would double overnight due to the seasonal influxes of migrant families. Large tents would be put up and temporary teachers were hired, as needed. School bus service began in 1936 when an old Reo bus was purchased from the Kern County High School District.

The 1952 Kern County earthquake rendered Fairfax School unfit for occupancy. This led to the construction of the present Fairfax School.

By the 1960s the average daily attendance for the District was 807. Currently the average daily attendance for the District nears 2000. Fairfax became a grade 4 – 8 school in 1999. In 2005 it became a grade 6-8 school and was renamed Fairfax Middle School.

Virginia Avenue School opened in January, 1953, with eight classrooms and the present cafeteria. Virginia Avenue became a k-4 school in 1999 and a K-2 school in 2005. Shirley Lane Elementary School opened in 2005. Six classrooms were added in 2006 to accommodate the rapid growth in the district. Shirley Lane Elementary is a grade 3-5 school. Zephyr Lane Elementary is the newest school added to the district, thus, changing Fairfax Middle school to a Junior High, serving only 7th and 8th grade students now.
