= Cawelo, California =

Unincorporated community in California, United States

Cawelo
- Unincorporated community
- Location in California Cawelo (the United States)
- Coordinates: 35°29′58″N 119°09′56″W
- Country: United States
- State: California
- County: Kern
- Elevation: 430 ft (130 m)

Cawelo is an unincorporated community in Kern County, California, United States. It is located on the Southern Pacific Railroad at an elevation of 427 feet (130 m). Cawelo is approximately 2 miles (3 km) east of Shafter-Minter Field, 6.5 miles (10 km) east of central Shafter, and 13 miles (21 km) northwest of Bakersfield. Its ZIP Code is 93263.

The name recalls the initial letters of the partners in the agricultural interest that founded the place: Camp, West, and Lowe.
