= Missouri Triangle, California =

Unincorporated community in California, United States

Missouri Triangle
- Unincorporated community
- Location in California Missouri Triangle (the United States)
- Coordinates: 35°26′20″N 119°41′24″W
- Country: United States
- State: California
- County: Kern
- Elevation: 561 ft (171 m)

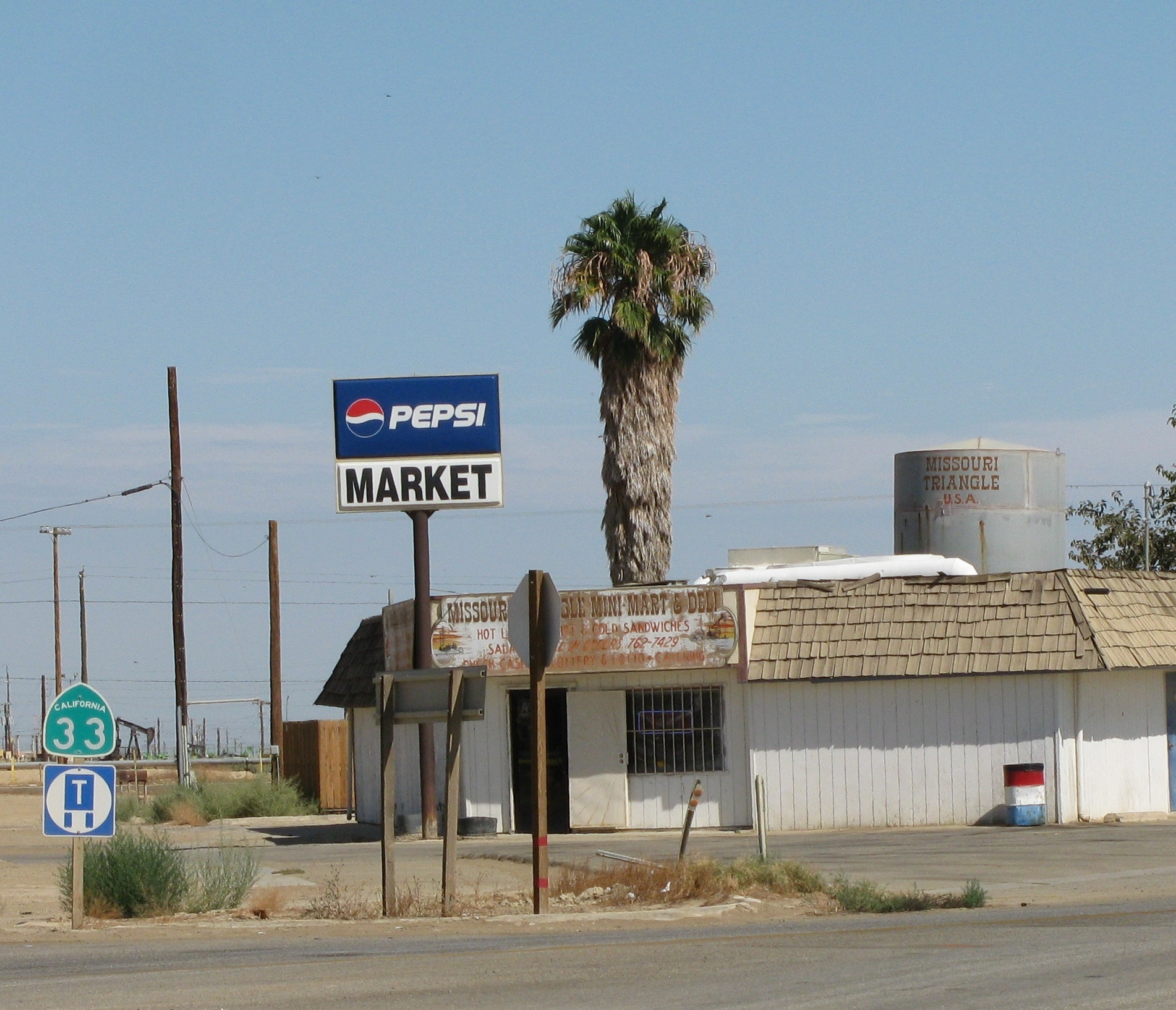
MiniMart at the corner of Lost Hills and Highway 33, looking north; note the oil derrick next to the highway sign.

Missouri Triangle is an unincorporated community in Kern County, California, United States. It is located 10 miles (16 km) north of McKittrick, at an elevation of 561 feet (171 m).

Defined by the triple junction of California State Route 33, Lost Hills Road, and 7th Standard Road, it is located entirely within the South Belridge Oil Field. Within the triangle formed by the inexact junction of the three major roads, there was previously a mini-mart and a water tower, with the place name painted on the water tower.

Aera Energy LLC operates most of the oil wells in the immediate vicinity.
