= Kernville Union School District =

School district in California, United States

Address
- 3240 Erskine Creek Road Lake Isabella, California, 93240; United States

District information
- Type: Public
- Grades: K–8
- NCES District ID: 0619590

Students and staff
- Students: 812 (2020–2021)
- Teachers: 39.05 (FTE)
- Staff: 63.82 (FTE)
- Student–teacher ratio: 20.79:1

Other information
- Website: www.kernvilleusd.org

Kernville Union Elementary School District is a public school district based in Kern County, California, United States.
