= Bakersfield Country Club (CDP), California =

Bakersfield Country Club
- Unincorporated community Census-designated place
- Location within California Location within the United States
- Coordinates: 35°23′23.61″N 118°56′27.29″W
- Country: United States
- State: California
- County: Kern

Area
  - Total: 0.758 sq mi (1.96 km^{2})
  - Land: 0.758 sq mi (1.96 km^{2})
- Elevation: 709 ft (216 m)

Population (2020)
  - Total: 1,715
  - Density: 2,260/sq mi (874/km^{2})
- Time zone: UTC-8 (Pacific)
  - Summer (DST): UTC-7 (PDT)
- GNIS feature ID: 2804108

Bakersfield Country Club is an unincorporated community and census designated place (CDP) in Kern County, California, United States. It bears the name of the Bakersfield Country Club, which is included in its geography. As of the 2020 U.S. census, the population was 1,715.

== Demographics ==
Bakersfield Country Club was first listed as a census designated place in the 2020 U.S. census.

Historical population
Census	Pop.	Note	%±
2020	1,715		—
U.S. Decennial Census; 1860–1870 1880-1890; 1900 1910 1920; 1930 1940 1950; 1960 1970 1980; 1990 2000 2010; 2020

=== 2020 census ===
Bakersfield Country Club CDP, California – Racial and ethnic composition Note: the US Census treats Hispanic/Latino as an ethnic category. This table excludes Latinos from the racial categories and assigns them to a separate category. Hispanics/Latinos may be of any race.
Race / Ethnicity (NH = Non-Hispanic)	Pop 2020	% 2020
White alone (NH)	793	46.24%
Black or African American alone (NH)	28	1.63%
Native American or Alaska Native alone (NH)	15	0.87%
Asian alone (NH)	51	2.97%
Native Hawaiian or Pacific Islander alone (NH)	1	0.06%
Other Race alone (NH)	8	0.47%
Mixed race or Multiracial (NH)	78	4.55%
Hispanic or Latino (any race)	741	43.21%
Total	1,715	100.00%
