= Smith Corner, California =

Smith Corner
- census-designated place
- Location in Kern County and the state of California

- Location in California
- Coordinates: 35°28′42″N 119°16′43″W
- Country: United States
- State: California
- County: Kern

Area
  - Total: 0.220 sq mi (0.569 km^{2})
  - Land: 0.220 sq mi (0.569 km^{2})
  - Water: 0 sq mi (0 km^{2}) 0%
- Elevation: 331 ft (101 m)

Population (2020)
  - Total: 594
  - Density: 2,700/sq mi (1,040/km^{2})
- Time zone: UTC-8 (Pacific (PST))
  - Summer (DST): UTC-7 (PDT)
- ZIP code: 93263
- Area code: 661
- GNIS feature IDs: 249586; 2629764

Smith Corner is a census-designated place in Kern County, California, United States. It is located 1.5 miles (2.4 km) south of Shafter, at an elevation of 331 feet (101 m). The population was 594 at the 2020 census.

== Demographics ==
Historical population
Census	Pop.	Note	%±
2010	524		—
2020	594		13.4%
U.S. Decennial Census; 1860–1870 1880-1890; 1900 1910 1920; 1930 1940 1950; 1960 1970 1980; 1990 2000 2010; 2020

Smith Corner first appeared as a census designated place in the 2010 U.S. census.

=== 2020 census ===
Smith Corner CDP, California – Racial and ethnic composition Note: the US Census treats Hispanic/Latino as an ethnic category. This table excludes Latinos from the racial categories and assigns them to a separate category. Hispanics/Latinos may be of any race.
Race / Ethnicity (NH = Non-Hispanic)	Pop 2010	Pop 2020	% 2010	% 2020
White alone (NH)	77	48	14.69%	8.08%
Black or African American alone (NH)	2	1	0.38%	0.17%
Native American or Alaska Native alone (NH)	1	11	0.19%	1.85%
Asian alone (NH)	1	0	0.19%	0.00%
Native Hawaiian or Pacific Islander alone (NH)	0	0	0.00%	0.00%
Other race alone (NH)	0	1	0.00%	0.17%
Mixed race or Multiracial (NH)	3	16	0.57%	2.69%
Hispanic or Latino (any race)	440	517	83.97%	87.04%
Total	524	594	100.00%	100.00%

The 2020 United States census reported that Smith Corner had a population of 594. The population density was 2,700.0 inhabitants per square mile (1,042.5/km^{2}). The racial makeup of Smith Corner was 149 (25.1%) White, 1 (0.2%) African American, 15 (2.5%) Native American, 0 (0.0%) Asian, 0 (0.0%) Pacific Islander, 357 (60.1%) from other races, and 72 (12.1%) from two or more races. Hispanic or Latino of any race were 517 persons (87.0%).

The whole population lived in households. There were 148 households, out of which 65 (43.9%) had children under the age of 18 living in them, 68 (45.9%) were married-couple households, 12 (8.1%) were cohabiting couple households, 40 (27.0%) had a female householder with no partner present, and 28 (18.9%) had a male householder with no partner present. 19 households (12.8%) were one person, and 5 (3.4%) were one person aged 65 or older. The average household size was 4.01. There were 121 families (81.8% of all households).

The age distribution was 203 people (34.2%) under the age of 18, 61 people (10.3%) aged 18 to 24, 155 people (26.1%) aged 25 to 44, 129 people (21.7%) aged 45 to 64, and 46 people (7.7%) who were 65 years of age or older. The median age was 29.2 years. For every 100 females, there were 80.5 males.

There were 160 housing units at an average density of 727.3 units per square mile (280.8 units/km^{2}), of which 148 (92.5%) were occupied. Of these, 58 (39.2%) were owner-occupied, and 90 (60.8%) were occupied by renters.
