= Mountain Meadows, California =

- Unincorporated community Census designated place
- Location within California
- Coordinates: 35°5′44.16″N 118°26′0.43″W
- Country: United States
- State: California
- County: Kern

Area
  - Total: 4.120 sq mi (10.67 km^{2})
  - Land: 4.112 sq mi (10.65 km^{2})
  - Water: 0.008 sq mi (0.021 km^{2})
- Elevation: 4,354 ft (1,327 m)

Population (2020)
  - Total: 303
  - Density: 73.7/sq mi (28.5/km^{2})
- Time zone: UTC-8 (PST)
  - Summer (DST): UTC-7 (PDT)
- GNIS feature ID: 2804422

Mountain Meadows is an unincorporated community and census designated place (CDP) in Kern County, California, United States. Per the 2020 census, the population was 303.

== Demographics ==
Historical population
Census	Pop.	Note	%±
2020	303		—
U.S. Decennial Census; 1860–1870 1880-1890; 1900 1910 1920; 1930 1940 1950; 1960 1970 1980; 1990 2000 2010; 2020

Mountain Meadows first appeared as a census designated place in the 2020 U.S. census.

=== 2020 Census ===
Mountain Meadows CDP, California – Racial and ethnic composition Note: the US Census treats Hispanic/Latino as an ethnic category. This table excludes Latinos from the racial categories and assigns them to a separate category. Hispanics/Latinos may be of any race.
Race / Ethnicity (NH = Non-Hispanic)	Pop 2020	% 2020
White alone (NH)	177	58.42%
Black or African American alone (NH)	0	0.00%
Native American or Alaska Native alone (NH)	1	0.33%
Asian alone (NH)	6	1.98%
Native Hawaiian or Pacific Islander alone (NH)	0	0.00%
Other race alone (NH)	0	0.00%
Mixed race or Multiracial (NH)	25	8.25%
Hispanic or Latino (any race)	94	31.02%
Total	303	100.00%
