= Fuller Acres, California =

Fuller Acres
- census-designated place
- Location of Fuller Acres in Kern County, California.

- Location in California
- Coordinates: 35°18′00″N 118°54′42″W
- Country: United States
- State: California
- County: Kern

Area
  - Total: 0.754 sq mi (1.954 km^{2})
  - Land: 0.754 sq mi (1.954 km^{2})
  - Water: 0 sq mi (0 km^{2}) 0%
- Elevation: 420 ft (128 m)

Population (2020)
  - Total: 917
  - Density: 1,220/sq mi (469/km^{2})
- Time zone: UTC-8 (Pacific (PST))
  - Summer (DST): UTC-7 (PDT)
- ZIP code: 93307
- Area code: 661
- GNIS feature IDs: 242534; 2629762

Fuller Acres (formerly Hilltop) is a census-designated place in Kern County, California, United States. It is located 7.25 miles (12 km) southeast of downtown Bakersfield, at an elevation of 420 feet (128.02 m). The population was 917 at the 2020 census.

== Demographics ==
Historical population
Census	Pop.	Note	%±
2010	991		—
2020	917		−7.5%
U.S. Decennial Census; 1860–1870 1880-1890; 1900 1910 1920; 1930 1940 1950; 1960 1970 1980; 1990 2000 2010; 2020

Fuller Acres first appeared as a census designated place in the 2010 U.S. census.

=== 2020 census ===
Fuller Acres CDP, California – Racial and ethnic composition Note: the US Census treats Hispanic/Latino as an ethnic category. This table excludes Latinos from the racial categories and assigns them to a separate category. Hispanics/Latinos may be of any race.
Race / Ethnicity (NH = Non-Hispanic)	Pop 2010	Pop 2020	% 2010	% 2020
White alone (NH)	192	99	19.37%	10.80%
Black or African American alone (NH)	13	2	1.31%	0.22%
Native American or Alaska Native alone (NH)	9	6	0.91%	0.65%
Asian alone (NH)	1	2	0.10%	0.22%
Native Hawaiian or Pacific Islander alone (NH)	0	0	0.00%	0.00%
Other race alone (NH)	1	20	0.10%	2.18%
Mixed race or Multiracial (NH)	7	19	0.71%	2.07%
Hispanic or Latino (any race)	768	769	77.50%	83.86%
Total	991	917	100.00%	100.00%

The 2020 United States census reported that Fuller Acres had a population of 917. The population density was 1,216.2 inhabitants per square mile (469.6/km^{2}). The racial makeup of Fuller Acres was 211 (23.0%) White, 2 (0.2%) African American, 35 (3.8%) Native American, 2 (0.2%) Asian, 1 (0.1%) Pacific Islander, 507 (55.3%) from other races, and 159 (17.3%) from two or more races. Hispanic or Latino of any race were 769 persons (83.9%).

The whole population lived in households. There were 232 households, out of which 105 (45.3%) had children under the age of 18 living in them, 129 (55.6%) were married-couple households, 17 (7.3%) were cohabiting couple households, 51 (22.0%) had a female householder with no partner present, and 35 (15.1%) had a male householder with no partner present. 25 households (10.8%) were one person, and 11 (4.7%) were one person aged 65 or older. The average household size was 3.95. There were 193 families (83.2% of all households).

The age distribution was 292 people (31.8%) under the age of 18, 78 people (8.5%) aged 18 to 24, 225 people (24.5%) aged 25 to 44, 223 people (24.3%) aged 45 to 64, and 99 people (10.8%) who were 65 years of age or older. The median age was 33.1 years. For every 100 females, there were 105.1 males.

There were 248 housing units at an average density of 328.9 units per square mile (127.0 units/km^{2}), of which 232 (93.5%) were occupied. Of these, 100 (43.1%) were owner-occupied, and 132 (56.9%) were occupied by renters.
