= El Adobe, California =

Census-designated place in California

- Unincorporated community Census-designated place
- Location in the United States
- Coordinates: 35°14′42″N 118°57′32″W
- Country: United States
- State: California
- County: Kern

Area
  - Total: 1.002 sq mi (2.60 km^{2})
  - Land: 1.002 sq mi (2.60 km^{2})
  - Water: 0 sq mi (0 km^{2})
- Elevation: 348 ft (106 m)

Population (2020)
  - Total: 391
  - Density: 390/sq mi (151/km^{2})
- Time zone: UTC-8 (Pacific)
  - Summer (DST): UTC-7 (PDT)
- GNIS feature ID: 2804119

El Adobe is an unincorporated community and census-designated place in Kern County, California, United States. The population was 391 at the 2020 census. El Adobe is 9 miles (14 km) south of Bakersfield.

== Demographics ==
Historical population
Census	Pop.	Note	%±
2020	391		—
U.S. Decennial Census; 1860–1870 1880-1890; 1900 1910 1920; 1930 1940 1950; 1960 1970 1980; 1990 2000 2010; 2020

El Adobe first appeared as a census designated place in the 2020 U.S. census.

=== 2020 Census ===
El Adobe CDP, California – Racial and ethnic composition Note: the US Census treats Hispanic/Latino as an ethnic category. This table excludes Latinos from the racial categories and assigns them to a separate category. Hispanics/Latinos may be of any race.
Race / Ethnicity (NH = Non-Hispanic)	Pop 2020	% 2020
White alone (NH)	85	21.74%
Black or African American alone (NH)	2	0.51%
Native American or Alaska Native alone (NH)	2	0.51%
Asian alone (NH)	4	1.02%
Native Hawaiian or Pacific Islander alone (NH)	0	0.00%
Other race alone (NH)	1	0.26%
Mixed race or Multiracial (NH)	10	2.56%
Hispanic or Latino (any race)	287	73.40%
Total	391	100.00%
