= Gypsite, California =

Unincorporated community in California, United States

Gypsite
- Ghost town
- Location in California Gypsite (the United States)
- Coordinates: 35°19′52″N 117°55′52″W
- Country: United States
- State: California
- County: Kern
- Elevation: 1,959 ft (597 m)

Gypsite was a small community at the site of a mill in Kern County, California, United States.

It is located 3 miles (4.8 km) southwest of Saltdale, in the Fremont Valley of the Mojave Desert at an elevation of 1,959 feet (597 m). It is located near Koehn Lake south-southwest of Ridgecrest near Garlock, California.

== History ==
In late 1909 Charles Koehn found a large deposit of gypsite (a mixture of gypsum and clay) in the bed of Koehn Lake. In 1910 or 1911, the California Crown Plaster & Gypsite Company leased Koehn's claims and built a mill at Kane (Cane) Spring, located just north of Gypsite. A post office operated at Gypsite from June 1911 to March 1912. In January 1912, Koehn was involved in a shootout at "Cain" springs where he constructed a rolling fort and held off 17 gunman during a dispute with T.H. Rosenberger about Koehn's mineral claims. During the summer of 1912, 12 men produced 30 tons of plaster per day. In December, 1912, after a court case concerning the gunfight, Koehn sold the springs to Thomas Thorkildsen who then sold to the Diamond Salt Company of Los Angeles. In 1913, a 3-mile narrow-gauge railroad was built on the lake bed. The company also built a hotel, houses, a depot and a post office (which was never reopened).

In 1915, the operation failed and Koehn took over the mill. Production was intermittent until 1928, when Koehn was convicted of attempted murder of a San Bernardino judge and Koehn lost control of the site. George Abel took over production until his death in the early 1930s. Intermittent production again continued until the 1950s.
