= Rio Bravo-Greeley Union Elementary School District =

School district in California, United States

Rio Bravo-Greeley Union School District

Location
- 6521 Enos Ln. Bakersfield, California 93314 United States

Other information
- Website: www.rbgusd.k12.ca.us

Rio Bravo-Greeley Union School District is a public school district in Kern County, California, United States.
