= Olde Stockdale, California =

Census-designated place in California

- Unincorporated community Census-designated place
- Location in the United States
- Coordinates: 35°20′51.36″N 119°4′45.74″W
- Country: United States
- State: California
- County: Kern

Area
  - Total: 0.407 sq mi (1.05 km^{2})
  - Land: 0.407 sq mi (1.05 km^{2})
  - Water: 0 sq mi (0 km^{2})
- Elevation: 381 ft (116 m)

Population (2020)
  - Total: 568
  - Density: 1,400/sq mi (539/km^{2})
- Time zone: UTC-8 (Pacific)
  - Summer (DST): UTC-7 (PDT)
- ZIP code: 93309
- Area code: 661
- GNIS feature ID: 2804423

Olde Stockdale is an unincorporated community and census-designated place (CDP) in Kern County, California, United States. The population was 568 at the 2020 census.

== Geography ==
Olde Stockdale is entirely surrounded by the Bakersfield city limits.

According to the United States Census Bureau, the CDP has a total area of 0.407 square mile (1.06 km^{2}), all land.

== History ==
Olde Stockdale is constructed around Stockdale Country Club, at the historic site of Tevis Mansion. The community, formerly on the outskirts of Bakersfield, has become surrounded by the city. Olde Stockdale residents refused annexation into Bakersfield in 1979.

== Demographics ==
Historical population
Census	Pop.	Note	%±
2020	568		—
U.S. Decennial Census; 1860–1870 1880-1890; 1900 1910 1920; 1930 1940 1950; 1960 1970 1980; 1990 2000 2010; 2020

Olde Stockdale first appeared as a census designated place in the 2020 U.S. census.

=== 2020 Census ===
Olde Stockdale CDP, California – Racial and ethnic composition Note: the US Census treats Hispanic/Latino as an ethnic category. This table excludes Latinos from the racial categories and assigns them to a separate category. Hispanics/Latinos may be of any race.
Race / Ethnicity (NH = Non-Hispanic)	Pop 2020	% 2020
White alone (NH)	498	87.68%
Black or African American alone (NH)	3	0.53%
Native American or Alaska Native alone (NH)	0	0.00%
Asian alone (NH)	10	1.76%
Native Hawaiian or Pacific Islander alone (NH)	0	0.00%
Other race alone (NH)	7	1.23%
Mixed race or Multiracial (NH)	9	1.58%
Hispanic or Latino (any race)	41	7.22%
Total	568	100.00%
