= Stebbins, California =

- Unincorporated community Census designated place
- Location within California
- Coordinates: 35°24′20″N 119°18′51″W
- Country: United States
- State: California
- County: Kern

Area
  - Total: 0.999 sq mi (2.59 km^{2})
  - Land: 0.999 sq mi (2.59 km^{2})
  - Water: 0 sq mi (0 km^{2})
- Elevation: 308 ft (94 m)

Population (2020)
  - Total: 1,423
  - Density: 1,420/sq mi (550/km^{2})
- Time zone: UTC-8 (PST)
  - Summer (DST): UTC-7 (PDT)
- GNIS feature ID: 2804431

Stebbins is an unincorporated community and census designated place (CDP) in Kern County, California, United States. Per the 2020 census, the population was 1,423.

== Demographics ==
Historical population
| Census | Pop. | Note | %± |
|---|---|---|---|
| 2020 | 1,423 | | — |
U.S. Decennial Census; 1860–1870 1880-1890; 1900 1910 1920; 1930 1940 1950; 1960 1970 1980; 1990 2000 2010; 2020

Stebbins first appeared as a census designated place in the 2020 U.S. census.

=== 2020 census ===
As of the 2020 census, Stebbins had a population of 1,423. The median age was 28.3 years. 32.8% of residents were under the age of 18 and 8.2% of residents were 65 years of age or older. For every 100 females there were 104.7 males, and for every 100 females age 18 and over there were 105.6 males age 18 and over.

0.0% of residents lived in urban areas, while 100.0% lived in rural areas.

There were 358 households in Stebbins, of which 52.8% had children under the age of 18 living in them. Of all households, 62.3% were married-couple households, 17.6% were households with a male householder and no spouse or partner present, and 14.5% were households with a female householder and no spouse or partner present. About 11.8% of all households were made up of individuals and 5.1% had someone living alone who was 65 years of age or older.

There were 376 housing units, of which 4.8% were vacant. The homeowner vacancy rate was 2.8% and the rental vacancy rate was 2.3%.

Stebbins CDP, California – Racial and ethnic composition Note: the US Census treats Hispanic/Latino as an ethnic category. This table excludes Latinos from the racial categories and assigns them to a separate category. Hispanics/Latinos may be of any race.
| Race / Ethnicity (NH = Non-Hispanic) | Pop 2020 | % 2020 |
|---|---|---|
| White alone (NH) | 369 | 25.93% |
| Black or African American alone (NH) | 5 | 0.35% |
| Native American or Alaska Native alone (NH) | 3 | 0.21% |
| Asian alone (NH) | 4 | 0.28% |
| Native Hawaiian or Pacific Islander alone (NH) | 0 | 0.00% |
| Other race alone (NH) | 10 | 0.70% |
| Mixed race or Multiracial (NH) | 30 | 2.11% |
| Hispanic or Latino (any race) | 1,002 | 70.41% |
| Total | 1,423 | 100.00% |
