= Oil City, California =

Unincorporated community in California, United States

Oil City
- Unincorporated community
- Location in California Oil City (the United States)
- Coordinates: 35°25′35″N 118°57′37″W
- Country: United States
- State: California
- County: Kern
- Elevation: 449 ft (137 m)

Oil City is an unincorporated community in Kern County, California, United States, approximately 5 miles (8 km) northeast of Bakersfield, adjacent to the Kern River Oil Field.

Another "Oil City" is located in Fresno County within the Coalinga Oil Field, about 9 miles (14 km) north of Coalinga, at an elevation of 449 feet (137 m).

The town was named for Oil City, Pennsylvania.
