= Midoil, California =

Unincorporated community in California, United States

Midoil
- Unincorporated community
- Location in California Midoil (the United States)
- Coordinates: 35°09′30″N 119°31′21″W
- Country: United States
- State: California
- County: Kern County
- Elevation: 1,339 ft (408 m)

Midoil (formerly, Midland) is an unincorporated community in Kern County, California, United States. It is located 2 miles (3.2 km) southeast of Fellows, at an elevation of 1,339 feet (408 m).

Midoil is no longer a permanently populated place. It is within the zone of active operations of the Midway-Sunset Oil Field, approximately midway between Fellows and Taft, along Midoil Road, which winds through the pumpjacks, pipelines, and tank batteries, roughly paralleling California State Route 33 about a mile to the northeast. Chevron Corporation is the primary operator in the area.

A post office operated at Midland from 1908 to 1914.
