= Blake School District =

School district in California, United States

Address
- 19165 Main Street Woody, California, 93287; United States

District information
- Type: Public
- Grades: K–8
- NCES District ID: 0605250

Students and staff
- Students: 22
- Teachers: 2.0 (FTE)
- Staff: 1.0 (FTE)
- Student–teacher ratio: 11.0:1

Other information
- Website: blakesd.org

Blake Elementary School District is a public school district based in Kern County, California.
