= Adobe Station, California =

Telegraph Stage line stop in California, US

Coordinates: 35.1944°N 119.009°W

Adobe Station was a stop on the Telegraph Stage line in Kern County, California, southeast of Greenfield, during the early 1870s. It was situated 12 miles (19 km) from Bakersfield on the Fort Tejon road. with the earliest mention being of a murder, attempted murder and attempted robbery committed by a man who met his victims at the station in 1873. The proprietor of the Station, Charles A. Hyde, was murdered by hatchet and his silver watch and money stolen in 1876. A hotel was operated by Peter P. Roquette in 1880. Roquette was also noted in a newspaper as a sheep shearer and Adobe Station referred to as a popular sheep shearing station.
