= Wonder Acres, Kern County, California =

Unincorporated community in California, United States

Coordinates: 35.12925°N 118.11543°W

Wonder Acres is a settlement in the western Mojave Desert, within eastern Kern County, southern California, in the United States.

It is located northeast of the city of Mojave, on California State Route 14 at the intersection with California City Boulevard. It is 5 miles (8.0 km) west of California City, and 4 miles (6.4 km) east of Cache Creek.

== History ==
The development began when A. J. Wonder drilled for oil in 1949 and found water. He then subdivided the land into five-acre (2.0 ha) lots, supplied them with piped water, and sold them.

In the 1960s Robert W. Shaneyfelt made the settlement name well known when he painted the name of the settlement on the community water tank on California City Boulevard.

The main street in Wonder Acres is named "Janice Street". Margaret Shaneyfelt was primarily responsible for negotiating with the affected parties to arrive with this as an agreeable compromise.

== Services ==
Wonder Acres is served by the Mojave Post Office, and is most closely associated with Mojave for services.

Its area code is 760, the same as nearby California City. During most of the latter 20th century, Wonder Acres was in the Mojave Unified School District, and the Tehachapi Cemetery District.

== See also ==
- Populated places in the Mojave Desert
