= Edmundson Acres, California =

Edmundson Acres
- census-designated place
- Location of Edmundson Acres in Kern County, California.

- Location in California
- Coordinates: 35°13′44″N 118°49′23″W
- Country: United States
- State: California
- County: Kern

Area
  - Total: 0.066 sq mi (0.172 km^{2})
  - Land: 0.066 sq mi (0.172 km^{2})
  - Water: 0 sq mi (0 km^{2}) 0%
- Elevation: 486 ft (148 m)

Population (2020)
  - Total: 296
  - Density: 4,460/sq mi (1,720/km^{2})
- Time zone: UTC-8 (Pacific (PST))
  - Summer (DST): UTC-7 (PDT)
- ZIP Code: 93203
- GNIS feature IDs: 1660590; 2629761

Edmundson Acres is a census-designated place in Kern County, California, United States. It is located 1.25 miles (2 km) north-northeast of Arvin, at an elevation of 486 feet (148 m). Edmundson Acres' ZIP code is 93203. The population was 296 at the 2020 census.

== Demographics ==
Historical population
Census	Pop.	Note	%±
2010	279		—
2020	296		6.1%
U.S. Decennial Census; 1860–1870 1880-1890; 1900 1910 1920; 1930 1940 1950; 1960 1970 1980; 1990 2000 2010; 2020

Edmundson Acres first appeared as a census designated place in the 2010 U.S. census.

=== 2020 ===
Edmundson Acres CDP, California – Racial and ethnic composition Note: the US Census treats Hispanic/Latino as an ethnic category. This table excludes Latinos from the racial categories and assigns them to a separate category. Hispanics/Latinos may be of any race.
Race / Ethnicity (NH = Non-Hispanic)	Pop 2010	Pop 2020	% 2010	% 2020
White alone (NH)	37	39	13.26%	13.18%
Black or African American alone (NH)	5	6	1.79%	2.03%
Native American or Alaska Native alone (NH)	2	5	0.72%	1.69%
Asian alone (NH)	1	2	0.36%	0.68%
Native Hawaiian or Pacific Islander alone (NH)	0	0	0.00%	0.00%
Other race alone (NH)	0	1	0.00%	0.34%
Mixed race or Multiracial (NH)	9	12	3.23%	4.05%
Hispanic or Latino (any race)	225	231	80.65%	78.04%
Total	279	296	100.00%	100.00%

The 2020 United States census reported that Edmundson Acres had a population of 296. The population density was 4,484.8 inhabitants per square mile (1,731.6/km^{2}). The racial makeup of Edmundson Acres was 72 (24.3%) White, 8 (2.7%) African American, 14 (4.7%) Native American, 2 (0.7%) Asian, 0 (0.0%) Pacific Islander, 146 (49.3%) from other races, and 54 (18.2%) from two or more races. Hispanic or Latino of any race were 231 persons (78.0%).

The whole population lived in households. There were 74 households, out of which 39 (52.7%) had children under the age of 18 living in them, 31 (41.9%) were married-couple households, 11 (14.9%) were cohabiting couple households, 17 (23.0%) had a female householder with no partner present, and 15 (20.3%) had a male householder with no partner present. 7 households (9.5%) were one person, and 2 (2.7%) were one person aged 65 or older. The average household size was 4.0. There were 61 families (82.4% of all households).

The age distribution was 90 people (30.4%) under the age of 18, 34 people (11.5%) aged 18 to 24, 88 people (29.7%) aged 25 to 44, 58 people (19.6%) aged 45 to 64, and 26 people (8.8%) who were 65 years of age or older. The median age was 28.9 years. For every 100 females, there were 129.5 males.

There were 81 housing units at an average density of 1,227.3 units per square mile (473.9 units/km^{2}), of which 74 (91.4%) were occupied. Of these, 42 (56.8%) were owner-occupied, and 32 (43.2%) were occupied by renters.
