= Norris School District =

School district in California

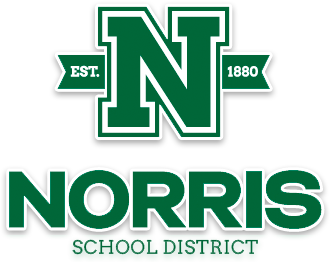
- Logo since 2015

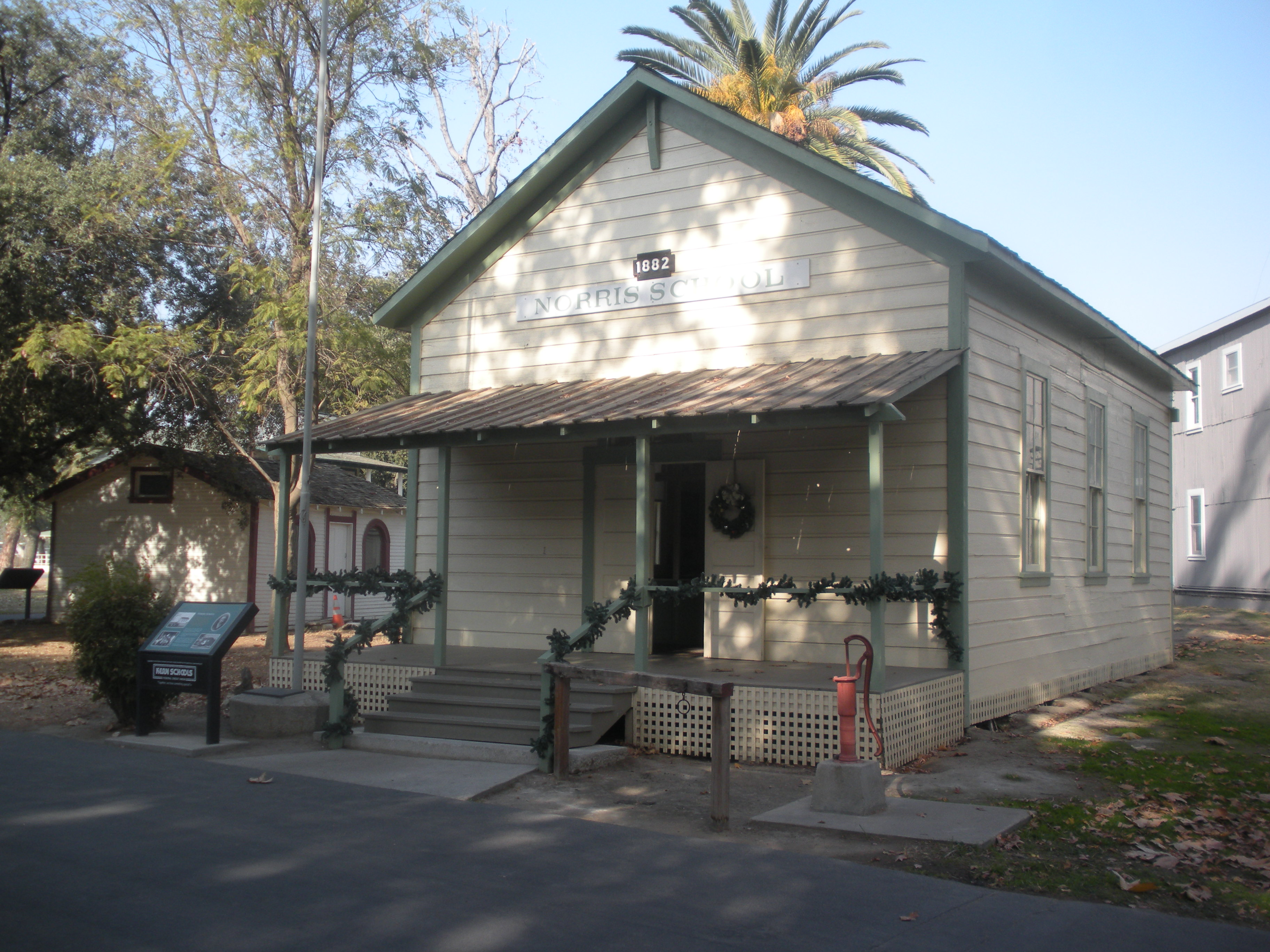
- The original Norris School building constructed in 1882, presently located at Kern County Museum

Address
- 6940 Calloway Drive Bakersfield, California, 93312; United States

District information
- Type: Public
- Grades: K–8
- Established: 1880
- Superintendent: Cy Silver
- Schools: 5
- NCES District ID: 0627450

Students and staff
- Students: 3,916 (2020–2021)
- Teachers: 165.59 (FTE)
- Staff: 174.52 (FTE)
- Student–teacher ratio: 23.65:1

Other information
- Website: www.norris.k12.ca.us

Norris School District is an elementary school district in Bakersfield, California.

Norris School District was established in 1880, when farmer, Robert Norris, donated land to the Norris School District in Northwest Bakersfield. The school district has grown in size since then, but its philosophies are much the same. There are currently four elementary schools: Norris Elementary, Olive Drive Elementary, William B. Bimat Elementary, and Veterans Elementary (opened in fall 2007). There is only one middle school, Norris Middle School, but the district has plans to build two new elementaries and one new middle school within the next ten years, depending on housing growth in the area.

In the 1990s Norris School District received a Golden Bell Award for their library program.

== Schools ==
With the growth of the school district, there have been three new schools built in the past decade.

=== Norris Elementary School ===
At first the Norris School was taught in a house of a local woman in 1880, however the Norris School was built in 1882 near Rosedale on land donated by Robert Norris, a local farmer. For 32 years, students in grades eight through one (at that time, children actually progressed from the highest to lowest grades) learned the three R's here. They also received moral and religious teachings through methods that relied heavily on rote and recitation. A teacher of a one-room school was expected to teach all eight grades as well as to serve as custodian, nurse, and disciplinarian, all for relatively little pay. The teachers at Norris School were fortunate in that one of the trustees of the district provided wood for the stove. In 1915, the school was rebuilt and it was much larger. Again in the 1950s it was reconstructed and again for the final time in 1980. In 2005 the school was moved to a new location for the middle school to have more room for more students. (In 2005 there were at least 3 students new to the Middle School every week.) Current principal is Erin Hudson. The school's mascot is the Squire.

=== Norris Middle School ===
Norris Middle School was established in 1959 on part of the elementary school's property. In 1983 a new addition to the campus separated the middle school from the elementary. Both schools continued growing and in 2005 Norris Elementary said goodbye to its historical campus and was moved out to Old Farm Road, leaving the entire campus to the Middle School (with the exception of one wing which still houses the District Offices). There is a new library named the Mary Louise Robinson Library. The band director is Jared Dalgleish, and the vocal music teacher is Ingrid Borja. As of the 2025-2026 school year, Norris Middles' principal is Amy Sawaske. This school is the district's only middle school, and its mascot is the Knight.

=== Olive Drive Elementary ===
Olive Drive Elementary was built in 1988 and opened in 1989. Due to growth within the District, nine additional classrooms were added in 2003. A new library was completed in 2014, named the "Richard P. Pierucci Library" in honor of the past superintendent that served in the district for 36 years. This school teaches grades Kindergarten through Grade 6, and the current principal is Brandy Rosander. The school mascot is the Trail Blazer.

=== William B. Bimat Elementary ===
William B. Bimat is an elementary school in the Norris School District, which teaches grades K-6. This school was opened in 2001-2002, and the current principal is Jodi Mudryk. It is named after William (Bill) Bimat, a teacher and principal that spent the majority of his career in education at North High School in Bakersfield. The school mascot is the Bulldog.

=== Veterans Elementary ===
Veterans elementary is the district's newest school. It opened on August 20, 2007. The school's current principal is Joni Sallee. The school colors are red, white, and blue. The school is very patriotic and supports the veterans and does a lot of things to help the community and support their veterans. The school now has a pledge to vow to always support their troops and never take them for granted. The school mascot is the Eagle.
