= Rosedale Union School District =

School district in California, United States

Address
- 2553 Old Farm Road Bakersfield, California, 93312; United States

District information
- Type: Public school district
- Motto: Where Learning is Lasting
- Grades: K–8
- Established: 1890
- Superintendent: Sue Lemon
- Schools: 9
- NCES District ID: 0633480

Students and staff
- Students: 5,762
- Teachers: 262.01 (FTE)
- Staff: 256.32 (FTE)
- Student–teacher ratio: 21.99:1

Other information
- Schedule: Nine-month
- Website: www.ruesd.net

Rosedale Union School District is a Kindergarten - 8th grade public school district in Bakersfield, California. The district has 9 schools, and serves Northwest Bakersfield.
