= Claraville, California =

Unincorporated community in California, United States

Claraville
- Unincorporated community
- Location in California Claraville (the United States)
- Coordinates: 35°26′32″N 118°19′46″W
- Country: United States
- State: California
- County: Kern
- Elevation: 6,302 ft (1,921 m)

Claraville (formerly Kelso and Clarasillo) is an unincorporated community in Kern County, California, United States. It is located 13 miles (21 km) north of Emerald Mountain, at an elevation of 6,302 feet (1,921 m).

A post office operated at Claraville from 1940 to 1941 and from 1949 to 1957. Originally a mining camp called Kelso, the place was renamed Claraville in honor of Clara Munckton, first white woman there. It developed in the 1860s, was deserted by 1869, and revived in the 1930s with the resumption of mining operations during the Depression.
