= Greenfield Union School District =

School district in California, United States

Address
- 1624 Fairview Road Bakersfield, California, 93307; United States

District information
- Type: Public school district
- Motto: Dedicated to Children
- Grades: K–8
- Superintendent: Ramon Hendrix
- NCES District ID: 0616050

Students and staff
- Students: 9,334 (2020–2021)
- Teachers: 414.67 (FTE)
- Staff: 364.53 (FTE)
- Student–teacher ratio: 22.51:1

Other information
- Schedule: Nine-month
- Website: www.gfusd.net

Greenfield Union School District is a Kindergarten - 8th grade public school district in Bakersfield, California. The district has 12 schools, and serves South Bakersfield.
