= Lakeside Union School District (Bakersfield) =

School district in California, United States

Address
- 14535 Old River Road Bakersfield, California, 93311; United States

District information
- Type: Public
- Grades: K–8
- Established: 1941
- Superintendent: Ty Bryson
- Schools: 2
- NCES District ID: 0620730

Students and staff
- Students: 1,447 (2020–2021)
- Teachers: 59.0 (FTE)
- Staff: 51.85 (FTE)
- Student–teacher ratio: 24.53:1

Other information
- Schedule: Nine-month
- Website: www.lakesideusd.org

Lakeside Union School District is a Kindergarten - 8th grade public school district in Bakersfield, California. The district has 2 schools, and serves Southwest Bakersfield.
