= Beardsley School District =

School district in California

Address
- 1001 Roberts Lane Bakersfield, California, 93308; United States
- Coordinates: 35°24′30″N 119°2′25″W

District information
- Type: Public school district
- Motto: It's all about the kids!
- Grades: K–8
- Established: 1882
- Superintendent: Dick Stotler
- Schools: 4
- Budget: $18 M
- NCES District ID: 0604260

Students and staff
- Students: 1,857
- Teachers: 90.0 (FTE)
- Staff: 113.37 (FTE)
- Student–teacher ratio: 20.63:1

Other information
- Schedule: Nine-month
- Website: www.beardsleyschool.org

Beardsley School District, in Bakersfield, California is a school district with four school facilities. The district consists of Beardsley Elementary School, North Beardsley School, San Lauren Elementary School and Beardsley Junior High School.

== History ==
=== Foundation ===
The district traces its origins back to the late 19th century when Lewis A. Beardsley donated an acre of land and helped build a one-room schoolhouse in May 1882. Mr. Beardsley was a former teacher and principal at Bakersfield School and served as Kern County Superintendent of Schools from 1874 to 1877. Following his county superintendence, he went into farming and later donated an acre of land to establish Beardsley School District. Beardsley School began with two teachers, Louis Beardsley and C. M. Chadwick, with an average daily attendance of 25 students. In 1883, Alexander B. MacPherson was added to the staff. Mr. MacPherson also served as Kern County Superintendent of Schools from 1883.

=== 1900-49 ===
School enrollment remained relatively small during the first thirty years of the district. Then in 1911, the school’s population increased to sixty students. A teacher was added to the staff in a makeshift classroom created for the following school year. In 1913, a $20,000 school bond was approved by the voters to build a new school. The new two-story schoolhouse opened the following year.

With the opening of the new school, a hot lunch program was started in 1914. Lunches were prepared in the classroom and cost five cents. Many of the vegetables used in the lunches were grown in the school garden. The school’s garden products even earned Beardsley an award at the 1915 Panama Pacific International Exposition in San Francisco.

A PTA was established and meetings were held twice monthly. The PTA was also the first in the county to sponsor a fundraising carnival to benefit the school.

The school boasted an outstanding track and field program, often winning the County Track Meets from 1921-24.

Beardsley experienced rapid growth over the next ten years from (1925–35). Average daily attendance climbed from 121 to 384 students. In recognition of this growth, voters approved a $120,000 bond issue in 1927 to expand school facilities, including a new auditorium and cafeteria.

In 1937, a new building was constructed to house a classroom, music room and dining area. At this time, a primary school was constructed with eight classrooms and a kindergarten. Later, in 1940, additional classrooms were built to complete the primary school that is now known as the Intermediate School.

During World War II, Beardsley students were active in raising “victory gardens” as well as harvesting crops on the surrounding farms. Student assistance in the harvest was needed due to the shortage of labor caused by the war.

In 1947, attendance had increased to 1284 students and the Junior High School was opened. The Junior High consisted of eight classrooms, library, and art rooms. Four more classrooms were added to the Junior High in 1948. In 1955, additional facilities were built for home economics, industrial arts, music room, and Junior High Office.

=== 1950-1999 ===
In 1950 attendance increased to 1,550 students. Much of the increase came from the northwest portion of the district and North Beardsley School was built in 1952. The new school outgrew its eight classrooms in two years and an additional eight classrooms were built in 1954.

By 1967 enrollment had reached 1935 students and in 1968, two wings consisting of eighteen classrooms were added at North Beardsley School.

In 1969 the Intermediate and Junior High Schools additional facilities included a new multipurpose room/cafetorium and an educational service center.

In 1977 the district built a library between the Junior High School and Intermediate School, which serves both schools.

In 1996, the school district implemented the “Class Size Reduction Program” (CSR) for a ratio of no less than one teacher for twenty students. The CSR Program was implemented at North Beardsley School in grades K–3.

In 1998 a gymnasium was constructed with the support of the Beardsley School Community Foundation, Optimist Club, Kern Community Development Program, and County Board of Supervisors.

=== 21st century ===
In 2001, the district converted the old intermediate cafeteria into a family resource center to house the Healthy Start and Head Start preschool programs.

An $8 million general obligation bond was passed in 2000 for modernizing all three school facilities and to build a new school.

In 2005, Beardsley opened San Lauren Elementary, its first new school in 53 years.
