= List of school districts in California =

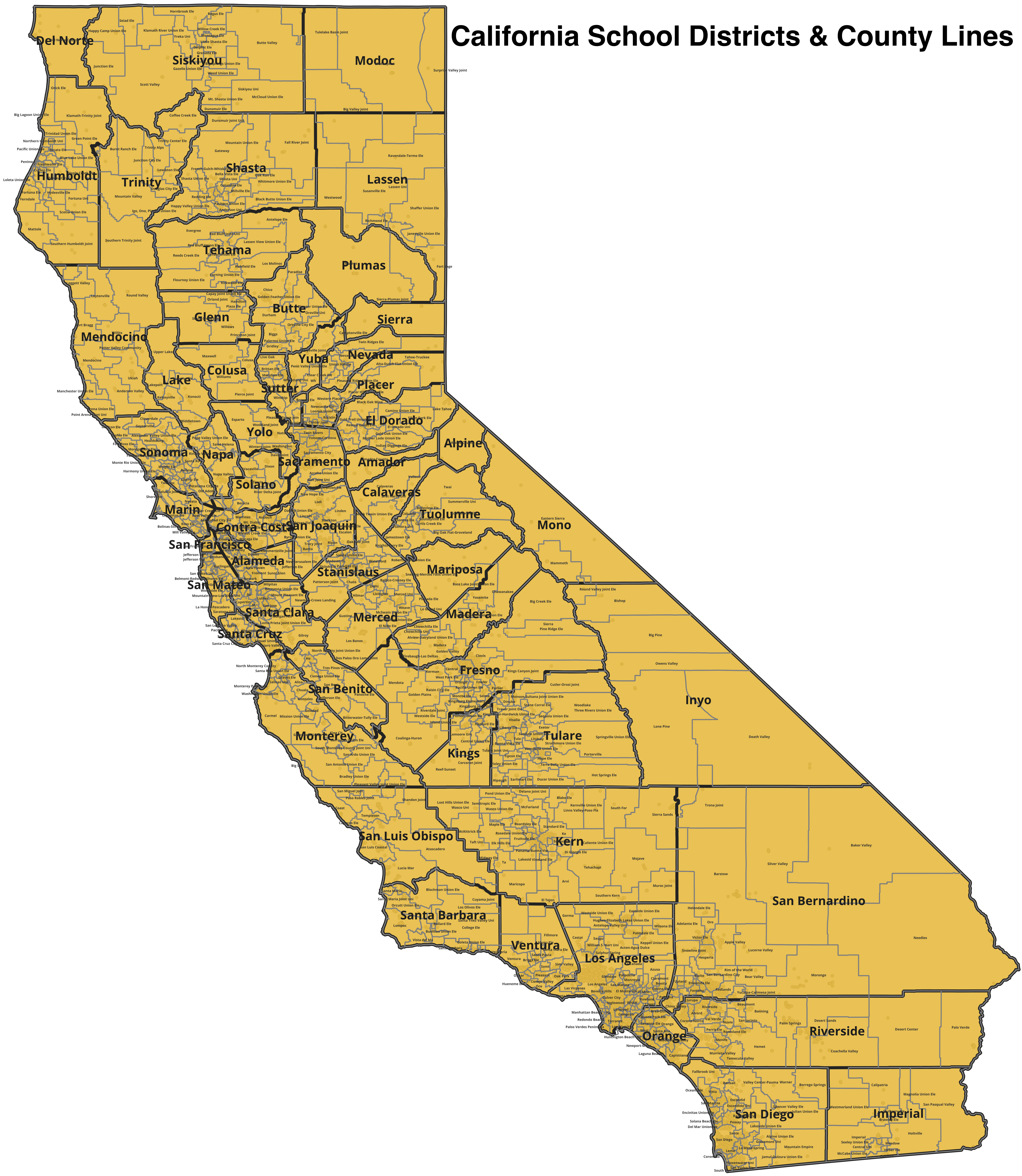
California school districts map

This is a list of school districts in California.

California school districts are of several varieties, usually a Unified district, which includes all of the Elementary and High Schools in the same geographic area; Elementary school districts, which includes K–6 or K–8 schools only, which may have several elementary districts within one high school district's geographic area; and High School Districts, which include one or more high schools in the same geographic area. Elementary districts sometimes includes the word Elementary within their names, but often do not. Sometimes the words Joint and/or Union are included in the district's name. A joint school district serves students from more than one county. When a school district becomes divided by a new or adjusted county boundary, it automatically becomes a joint district unless otherwise specified. A union elementary school district was formed as the result of a merger between two previous school districts, while a union high school district serves students from multiple elementary school districts.

Elementary school districts can be classified as: basic district, city district, regular district, union district, or joint union district. High school districts can be categorized as a union district, a city district, a joint union district, or a county district. These, along with unified school districts and community college districts, are counted as separate governments by the U.S. Census Bureau.

The typical district grade configurations in California are elementary (K–8), high (9–12), and unified (K–12), but there are some K–6 elementary districts and a handful of 7–12 high school districts. Districts sometimes merge or consolidate; the number of districts can change annually.

County-operated special service schools and school district-operated special schools are not counted as separate governments by the Census Bureau.

Most of the school districts are listed here, by their public name which they call themselves on their district websites.

== Alameda County ==
- Alameda Unified School District
- Albany Unified School District
- Berkeley Unified School District
- Castro Valley Unified School District
- Dublin Unified School District
- Emery Unified School District
- Fremont Unified School District
- Hayward Unified School District
- Livermore Valley Joint Unified School District
- Mountain House Elementary School District
- New Haven Unified School District
- Newark Unified School District
- Oakland Unified School District
- Piedmont Unified School District
- Pleasanton Unified School District
- San Leandro Unified School District
- San Lorenzo Unified School District
- KIPP King Collegiate High School
- Sunol Glen Unified School District

== Alpine County ==
- Alpine County Unified School District

== Amador County ==
- Amador County Unified School District

== Butte County ==
- Bangor Union Elementary School District
- Biggs Unified School District
- Chico Unified School District
- Durham Unified School District
- Golden Feather Union Elementary School District
- Gridley Unified School District
- Manzanita Elementary School District
- Oroville City Elementary School District
- Oroville Union High School District
- Palermo Union School District
- Paradise Unified School District
- Pioneer Union Elementary School District
- Thermalito Union School District

== Calaveras County ==
- Bret Harte Union High School District
- Calaveras Unified School District
- Mark Twain Union Elementary School District
- Vallecito Union School District

== Colusa County ==
- Colusa Unified School District
- Maxwell Unified School District
- Pierce Joint Unified School District
- Williams Unified School District

== Contra Costa County ==
- Acalanes Union High School District
- Antioch Unified School District
- Brentwood Union School District
- Byron Union School District
- Canyon Elementary School District
- John Swett Unified School District
- Knightsen Elementary School District
- Lafayette School District
- Liberty Union High School District
- Martinez Unified School District
- Moraga School District
- Mount Diablo Unified School District
- Oakley Union Elementary School District
- Orinda Union School District
- Pittsburg Unified School District
- San Ramon Valley Unified School District
- Walnut Creek School District
- West Contra Costa Unified School District

== Del Norte County ==
- Del Norte Unified School District

== El Dorado County ==
- Black Oak Mine Unified School District
- Buckeye Union School District
- Camino Union School District
- El Dorado Union High School District
- Gold Oak Union School District
- Gold Trail Union School District
- Lake Tahoe Unified School District
- Latrobe School District
- Mother Lode Union School District
- Omo Ranch School District
- Pioneer Union School District
- Placerville Union School District
- Pollock Pines School District
- Rescue Union School District
- Silver Fork School District

== Fresno County ==
- Alvina Elementary Charter School District
- Big Creek Elementary School District
- Burrel Union Elementary School District
- Caruthers Unified School District
- Central Unified School District
- Clay Joint Elementary School District
- Clovis Unified School District
- Coalinga-Huron Unified School District
- Firebaugh-Las Deltas Unified School District
- Fowler Unified School District
- Fresno Unified School District
- Golden Plains Unified School District
- Kerman Unified School District
- Kings Canyon Unified School District
- Kingsburg Elementary Charter School District
- Kingsburg Joint Union High School District
- Laton Joint Unified School District
- Mendota Unified School District
- Orange Center Elementary School District
- Pacific Union School District
- Parlier Unified School District
- Pine Ridge Elementary School District
- Raisin City Elementary School District
- Riverdale Unified School District
- Sanger Unified School District
- Selma Unified School District
- Sierra Unified School District
- Washington Colony Elementary School District
- Washington Unified School District
- West Park Elementary School District
- Westside Elementary School District

== Glenn County ==
- Capay Joint Union School District
- Hamilton Unified School District
- Lake Elementary School District
- Orland Unified School District
- Plaza Elementary School District
- Princeton Joint Unified School District
- Stony Creek Joint Unified School District
- Willows Unified School District

== Humboldt County ==
- Arcata School District
- Big Lagoon Union Elementary School District
- Blue Lake Union Elementary School District
- Bridgeville Elementary School District
- Cuddeback Elementary School District
- Cutten Elementary School District
- Eureka City Schools
- Ferndale Unified School District
- Fieldbrook Elementary School District
- Fortuna Elementary School District
- Fortuna Union High School District
- Freshwater School District
- Garfield Elementary School District
- Hydesville Elementary School District
- Jacoby Creek Charter School District
- Klamath-Trinity Joint Unified School District
- Kneeland Elementary School District
- Loleta Union Elementary School District
- Maple Creek Elementary School District
- Mattole Unified School District
- McKinleyville Union School District
- Northern Humboldt High School District
- Orick Elementary School District
- Pacific Union School District
- Peninsula Union School District
- Rio Dell School District
- Scotia Union School District
- South Bay Union School District
- Southern Humboldt Unified School District
- Trinidad Union School District

== Imperial County ==
- Brawley Elementary School District
- Brawley Union High School District
- Calexico Unified School District
- Calipatria Unified School District
- Central Union High School District
- El Centro School District
- Heber School District
- Holtville Unified School District
- Imperial Unified School District
- Magnolia Union School District
- McCabe Union School District
- Meadows Union School District
- Mulberry Elementary School District
- San Pasqual Valley Unified School District
- Seeley Union School District
- Westmorland Union Elementary School District

== Inyo County ==
- Big Pine Unified School District
- Bishop Unified School District
- Death Valley Unified School District
- Lone Pine Unified School District
- Owens Valley Unified School District
- Round Valley School District

== Kern County ==
- Arvin Union School District
- Bakersfield City School District
- Beardsley School District
- Blake School District
- Buttonwillow Union School District
- Caliente Union School District
- Delano Union Elementary School District
- Delano Joint Union High School District
- Di Giorgio School District
- Edison School District
- El Tejon Unified School District
- Elk Hills School District
- Fairfax School District
- Fruitvale School District
- General Shafter School District
- Greenfield Union School District
- Kern High School District
- Kernville Union School District
- Lakeside Union School District
- Lamont School District
- Linns Valley-Poso Flat Union School District
- Lost Hills Union School District
- Maple Elementary School District
- Maricopa Unified School District
- McFarland Unified School District
- McKittrick Elementary School District
- Midway School District
- Mojave Unified School District
- Muroc Joint Unified School District
- Norris School District
- Panama Buena Vista Union School District
- Pond Union School District
- Richland School District
- Rio Bravo-Greeley Union School District
- Rosedale Union School District
- Semitropic School District
- Sierra Sands Unified School District
- South Fork Union School District
- Southern Kern Unified School District
- Standard School District
- Taft City School District
- Taft Union High School District
- Tehachapi Unified School District
- Vineland School District
- Wasco Union Elementary School District
- Wasco Union High School District

== Kings County ==
- Armona Union School District
- Central Union Elementary School District
- Corcoran Unified School District
- Hanford Elementary School District
- Hanford Joint Union High School District
- Island Union Elementary School District
- Kings River-Hardwick Joint Union School District
- Kit Carson Union School District
- Lakeside School District
- Lemoore Union Elementary School District
- Lemoore Union High School District
- Pioneer Union Elementary School District
- Reef-Sunset Unified School District

== Lake County ==
- Kelseyville Unified School District
- Konocti Unified School District
- Lakeport Unified School District
- Lucerne Elementary School District
- Middletown Unified School District
- Upper Lake Unified School District

== Lassen County ==
- Big Valley Joint Unified School District
- Fort Sage Unified School District
- Janesville Union Elementary School District
- Johnstonville Elementary School District
- Lassen Union High School District
- Ravendale-Termo Elementary School District
- Richmond Elementary School District
- Shaffer Union Elementary School District
- Susanville School District
- Westwood Unified School District

== Los Angeles County ==
- ABC Unified School District
- Acton-Agua Dulce Unified School District
- Alhambra Unified School District
- Antelope Valley Union High School District
- Arcadia Unified School District
- Azusa Unified School District
- Baldwin Park Unified School District
- Bassett Unified School District
- Bellflower Unified School District
- Beverly Hills Unified School District
- Bonita Unified School District
- Burbank Unified School District
- Castaic Union School District
- Centinela Valley Union High School District
- Charter Oak Unified School District
- Claremont Unified School District
- Compton Unified School District
- Covina-Valley Unified School District
- Culver City Unified School District
- Downey Unified School District
- Duarte Unified School District
- East Whittier City School District
- Eastside Union School District
- El Monte City School District
- El Monte Union High School District
- El Rancho Unified School District
- El Segundo Unified School District
- Garvey School District
- Glendale Unified School District
- Glendora Unified School District
- Gorman Joint School District
- Hacienda La Puente Unified School District
- Hawthorne School District
- Hermosa Beach City School District
- Hughes-Elizabeth Lakes Union Elementary School District
- Inglewood Unified School District
- Keppel Union School District
- La Cañada Unified School District
- Lancaster School District
- Las Virgenes Unified School District
- Lawndale Elementary School District
- Lennox School District
- Little Lake City School District
- Long Beach Unified School District
- Los Angeles Unified School District
- Los Nietos School District
- Lynwood Unified School District
- Manhattan Beach Unified School District
- Monrovia Unified School District
- Montebello Unified School District
- Mountain View School District
- Newhall School District
- Norwalk–La Mirada Unified School District
- Palmdale School District
- Palos Verdes Peninsula Unified School District
- Paramount Unified School District
- Pasadena Unified School District
- Pomona Unified School District
- Redondo Beach Unified School District
- Rosemead School District
- Rowland Unified School District
- San Gabriel Unified School District
- San Marino Unified School District
- Santa Monica–Malibu Unified School District
- Saugus Union School District
- South Pasadena Unified School District
- South Whittier School District
- Sulphur Springs School District
- Temple City Unified School District
- Torrance Unified School District
- Valle Lindo Elementary School District
- Walnut Valley Unified School District
- West Covina Unified School District
- Westside Union School District
- Whittier City School District
- Whittier Union High School District
- William S. Hart Union High School District
- Wilsona Elementary School District
- Wiseburn Unified School District

== Madera County ==
- Alview-Dairyland School District
- Bass Lake Joint Union School District
- Chawanakee Unified School District
- Chowchilla School District
- Chowchilla Union High School District
- Golden Valley Unified School District
- Madera Unified School District
- Raymond Knowles Union Elementary School District
- Yosemite Unified School District

== Marin County ==
- Bolinas-Stinson Union School District
- Kentfield School District
- Laguna Joint School District
- Lagunitas School District
- Larkspur-Corte Madera School District
- Mill Valley School District
- Miller Creek Elementary School District
- Nicasio School District
- Novato Unified School District
- Reed Union School District
- Ross School District
- Ross Valley School District
- San Rafael Elementary School District
- San Rafael High School District
- Sausalito Marin City School District
- Shoreline Unified School District
- Tamalpais Union High School District

== Mariposa County ==
- Mariposa County Unified School District

== Mendocino County ==
- Anderson Valley Unified School District
- Arena Union Elementary School District
- Fort Bragg Unified School District
- Laytonville Unified School District
- Leggett Valley Unified School District
- Manchester Union Elementary School District
- Mendocino Unified School District
- Point Arena Joint Union High School District
- Potter Valley Community Unified School District
- Round Valley Unified School District
- Ukiah Unified School District
- Willits Unified School District

== Merced County ==
- Atwater Elementary School District
- Ballico-Cressey Elementary School District
- Delhi Unified School District
- Dos Palos Oro Loma Joint Unified School District
- El Nido Elementary School District
- Gustine Unified School District
- Hilmar Unified School District
- Le Grand Union Elementary School District
- Le Grand Union High School District
- Livingston Union School District
- Los Banos Unified School District
- McSwain Union Elementary School District
- Merced City Elementary School District
- Merced River Union Elementary School District
- Merced Union High School District
- Plainsburg Union Elementary School District
- Planada Elementary School District
- Snelling-Merced Falls Union Elementary School District
- Weaver Union Elementary School District
- Winton Elementary School District

== Modoc County ==
- Modoc Joint Unified School District
- Surprise Valley Joint Unified School District
- Tulelake Basin Joint Unified School District

== Mono County ==
- Eastern Sierra Unified School District
- Mammoth Unified School District

== Monterey County ==
- Alisal Union Elementary School District
- Big Sur Unified School District
- Bradley Union Elementary School District
- Carmel Unified School District
- Chualar Union Elementary School District
- Gonzales Unified School District
- Graves Elementary School District
- Greenfield Union Elementary School District
- King City Union Elementary School District
- Lagunita Elementary School District
- Mission Union Elementary School District
- Monterey Peninsula Unified School District
- North Monterey County Unified School District
- Pacific Grove Unified School District
- Salinas City Elementary School District
- Salinas Union High School District
- San Antonio Union Elementary School District
- San Ardo Union Elementary School District
- San Lucas Union Elementary School District
- Santa Rita Union Elementary School District
- Soledad Unified School District
- South Monterey County Joint Union High School District
- Spreckels Union Elementary School District
- Washington Union School District

== Napa County ==
- Calistoga Joint Unified School District
- Howell Mountain Elementary School District
- Napa Valley Unified School District
- Pope Valley Union Elementary School District
- St. Helena Unified School District

== Nevada County ==
- Chicago Park School District
- Clear Creek School District
- Grass Valley School District
- Nevada City School District
- Nevada Joint Union High School District
- Penn Valley Union Elementary School District
- Pleasant Ridge Union School District
- Twin Ridges School District
- Union Hill School District

== Orange County ==
- Anaheim Elementary School District
- Anaheim Union High School District
- Brea Olinda Unified School District
- Buena Park School District
- Capistrano Unified School District
- Centralia School District
- Cypress School District
- Fountain Valley School District
- Fullerton Joint Union High School District
- Fullerton School District
- Garden Grove Unified School District
- Huntington Beach City School District
- Huntington Beach Union High School District
- Irvine Unified School District
- La Habra City School District
- Laguna Beach Unified School District
- Los Alamitos Unified School District
- Lowell Joint School District
- Magnolia School District
- Newport-Mesa Unified School District
- Ocean View School District
- Orange Unified School District
- Placentia-Yorba Linda Unified School District
- Saddleback Valley Unified School District
- Santa Ana Unified School District
- Savanna School District
- Tustin Unified School District
- Westminster School District

== Placer County ==
- Ackerman Charter School District
- Alta Dutch Flat Elementary School District
- Auburn Union Elementary School District
- Colfax Elementary School District
- Dry Creek Joint Elementary School District
- Eureka Union School District
- Foresthill Union School District
- Loomis Union School District
- Newcastle Elementary School District
- Placer Hills Union Elementary School District
- Placer Union High School District
- Rocklin Unified School District
- Roseville City Elementary School District
- Roseville Joint Union High School District
- Tahoe-Truckee Unified School District
- Western Placer Unified School District

== Plumas County ==
- Plumas Unified School District

== Riverside County ==
- Alvord Unified School District
- Banning Unified School District
- Beaumont Unified School District
- Coachella Valley Unified School District
- Corona-Norco Unified School District
- Desert Center Unified School District
- Desert Sands Unified School District
- Hemet Unified School District
- Jurupa Unified School District
- Lake Elsinore Unified School District
- Menifee Union School District
- Moreno Valley Unified School District
- Murrieta Valley Unified School District
- Nuview Union Elementary School District
- Palm Springs Unified School District
- Palo Verde Unified School District
- Perris Elementary School District
- Perris Union High School District
- Riverside Unified School District
- Romoland Elementary School District
- San Jacinto Unified School District
- Temecula Valley Unified School District
- Val Verde Unified School District

== Sacramento County ==
- Arcohe Union Elementary School District
- Center Unified School District
- Elk Grove Unified School District
- Elverta Joint Elementary School District
- Folsom Cordova Unified School District
- Galt Joint Union Elementary School District
- Galt Joint Union High School District
- Natomas Unified School District
- River Delta Unified School District
- Robla School District
- Sacramento City Unified School District
- San Juan Unified School District
- Twin Rivers Unified School District

== San Benito County ==
- Aromas/San Juan Unified School District
- Bitterwater-Tully Joint Union Elementary School District
- Cienega Union Elementary School District
- Hollister Elementary School District
- Jefferson Elementary School District
- North County Joint Union Elementary School District
- Panoche Elementary School District
- San Benito High School District
- Southside Elementary School District
- Tres Pinos Union Elementary School District
- Willow Grove Union Elementary School District

== San Bernardino County ==
- Adelanto School District
- Alta Loma School District
- Apple Valley Unified School District
- Baker Valley Unified School District
- Barstow Unified School District
- Bear Valley Unified School District
- Central School District
- Chaffey Joint Union High School District
- Chino Valley Unified School District
- Colton Joint Unified School District
- Cucamonga School District
- Etiwanda School District
- Fontana Unified School District
- Helendale School District
- Hesperia Unified School District
- Lucerne Valley Unified School District
- Morongo Unified School District
- Mountain View School District
- Mt Baldy School District
- Needles Unified School District
- Ontario-Montclair School District
- Oro Grande School District
- Redlands Unified School District
- Rialto Unified School District
- Rim Of The World Unified School District
- San Bernardino City Unified School District
- Silver Valley Unified School District
- Snowline Joint Unified School District
- Trona Joint Unified School District
- Upland Unified School District
- Victor Elementary School District
- Victor Valley Union High School District
- Yucaipa-Calimesa Joint Unified School District

== San Diego County ==
- Alpine Union School District
- Bonsall Unified School District
- Borrego Springs Unified School District
- Cajon Valley Union School District
- Cardiff School District
- Carlsbad Unified School District
- Chula Vista Elementary School District
- Coronado Unified School District
- Dehesa School District
- Del Mar Union School District
- Encinitas Union School District
- Escondido Union High School District
- Escondido Union School District
- Fallbrook Union Elementary School District
- Fallbrook Union High School District
- Grossmont Union High School District
- Jamul-Dulzura Union School District
- Julian Union High School District
- Julian Union School District
- La Mesa-Spring Valley School District
- Lakeside Union School District
- Lemon Grove School District
- Mountain Empire Unified School District
- National School District
- Oceanside Unified School District
- Poway Unified School District
- Ramona Unified School District
- Rancho Santa Fe Elementary School District
- San Diego Unified School District
- San Dieguito Union High School District
- San Marcos Unified School District
- San Pasqual Union School District
- San Ysidro School District
- Santee School District
- Solana Beach School District
- South Bay Union School District
- Spencer Valley School District
- Sweetwater Union High School District
- Vallecitos School District
- Valley Center-Pauma Unified School District
- Vista Unified School District
- Warner Unified School District

== San Francisco County ==
- San Francisco Unified School District

== San Joaquin County ==
- Banta Unified School District
- Escalon Unified School District
- Jefferson Elementary District
- Lammersville Joint Unified School District
- Lincoln Unified School District
- Linden Unified School District
- Lodi Unified School District
- Manteca Unified School District
- New Hope Elementary School District
- New Jerusalem Elementary School District
- Oak View Elementary School District
- Ripon Unified School District
- Stockton Unified School District
- Tracy Unified School District

== San Luis Obispo County ==
- Atascadero Unified School District
- Cayucos Elementary School District
- Coast Union High School District
- Lucia Mar Unified School District
- Paso Robles Joint Unified School District
- Pleasant Valley Joint Union Elementary School District
- San Luis Coastal Unified School District
- San Miguel Joint Union Elementary School District
- Shandon Joint Unified School District
- Templeton Unified School District

== San Mateo County ==
- Bayshore Elementary School District
- Belmont - Redwood Shores School District
- Brisbane School District
- Burlingame School District
- Cabrillo Unified School District
- Hillsborough City School District
- Jefferson Elementary School District
- Jefferson Union High School District
- La Honda-Pescadero Unified School District
- Las Lomitas Elementary School District
- Menlo Park City School District
- Millbrae School District
- Pacifica School District
- Portola Valley Elementary School District
- Ravenswood City School District
- Redwood City School District
- San Bruno Park School District
- San Carlos School District
- San Mateo Union High School District
- San Mateo-Foster City School District
- Sequoia Union High School District
- South San Francisco Unified School District
- Woodside Elementary School District

== Santa Barbara County ==
- Ballard Elementary School District
- Blochman Union Elementary School District
- Buellton Union Elementary School District
- Carpinteria Unified School District
- Cold Spring Elementary School District
- College Elementary School District
- Cuyama Joint Unified School District
- Goleta Union Elementary School District
- Guadalupe Union Elementary School District
- Hope Elementary School District
- Lompoc Unified School District
- Los Olivos Elementary School District
- Montecito Union Elementary School District
- Orcutt Union Elementary School District
- Santa Barbara Unified School District
- Santa Maria Joint Union High School District
- Santa Maria-Bonita Elementary School District
- Santa Ynez Valley Union High School District
- Solvang Elementary School District
- Vista Del Mar Union Elementary School District

== Santa Clara County ==
- Alum Rock Union School District
- Berryessa Union School District
- Cambrian School District
- Campbell Union School District
- Campbell Union High School District
- Cupertino Union School District
- East Side Union High School District
- Evergreen Elementary School District
- Franklin-McKinley School District
- Fremont Union High School District
- Gilroy Unified School District
- Lakeside Joint School District
- Loma Prieta Joint Union Elementary School District
- Los Altos School District
- Los Gatos Union School District
- Los Gatos-Saratoga Joint Union High School District
- Luther Burbank School District
- Milpitas Unified School District
- Moreland School District
- Morgan Hill Unified School District
- Mount Pleasant Elementary School District
- Mountain View-Whisman School District
- Mountain View-Los Altos Union High School District
- Oak Grove School District
- Orchard Elementary School District
- Palo Alto Unified School District
- San Jose Unified School District
- Santa Clara Unified School District
- Saratoga Union Elementary School District
- Sunnyvale Elementary School District
- Union School District

== Santa Cruz County ==
- Bonny Doon School District
- Happy Valley Elementary School District
- Live Oak School District
- Mountain School District
- Pacific Elementary School District
- Pajaro Valley Unified School District
- San Lorenzo Valley Unified School District
- Santa Cruz Elementary School District
- Santa Cruz High School District
- Scotts Valley Unified School District
- Soquel Union Elementary School District

== Shasta County ==
- Anderson Union High School District
- Bella Vista Elementary School District
- Black Butte Union School District
- Cascade Elementary School District
- Castle Rock Elementary School District
- Columbia Elementary School District
- Cottonwood Union Elementary School District
- Enterprise Elementary School District
- Fall River Joint Unified School District
- French Gulch-Whiskeytown Union Elementary District
- Gateway Unified School District
- Grant Elementary School District
- Happy Valley Union Elementary School District
- Igo-Ono-Platina School District
- Junction Elementary School District
- Millville Elementary School District
- Mountain Union School District
- North Cow Creek School District
- Oak Run Elementary School District
- Pacheco Union School District
- Redding School District
- Shasta Union Elementary School District
- Shasta Union High School District
- Whitmore Elementary School District

== Sierra County ==
- Sierra-Plumas Joint Unified School District

== Siskiyou County ==
- Big Springs Elementary School District
- Bogus Elementary School District
- Butte Valley Unified School District
- Butteville Union Elementary School District
- Delphic Elementary School District
- Dunsmuir Elementary School District
- Dunsmuir Joint High School District
- Gazelle Union Elementary School District
- Grenada Elementary School District
- Happy Camp Union Elementary School District
- Hornbrook Elementary School District
- Junction Elementary School District
- Klamath River Union Elementary School District
- Little Shasta Elementary School District
- McCloud Union Elementary School District
- Montague Elementary School District
- Mount Shasta Union School District
- Scott Valley Unified School District
- Seiad Elementary School District
- Siskiyou Union High School District
- Weed Union Elementary School District
- Willow Creek Elementary School District
- Yreka Union Elementary School District
- Yreka Union High School District

== Solano County ==
- Benicia Unified School District
- Dixon Unified School District
- Fairfield-Suisun Unified School District
- Travis Unified School District
- Vacaville Unified School District
- Vallejo City Unified School District

== Sonoma County ==
- Alexander Valley Union School District
- Bellevue Union Elementary School District
- Bennett Valley Union School District
- Cinnabar School District
- Cloverdale Unified School District
- Cotati-Rohnert Park Unified School District
- Dunham School District
- Forestville School District
- Fort Ross School District
- Geyserville Unified School District
- Gravenstein Union School District
- Guerneville School District
- Harmony Union School District
- Healdsburg Unified School District
- Horicon School District
- Kenwood School District
- Liberty School District Petaluma
- Mark West Union School District
- Monte Rio Union School District
- Montgomery School District
- Oak Grove Union School District
- Old Adobe Union School District
- Petaluma City Elementary School District
- Petaluma Joint Union High School District
- Piner-Olivet Union School District
- Rincon Valley Union School District
- Roseland School District (California)
- Santa Rosa Elementary School District
- Santa Rosa High School District
- Sebastopol Union School District
- Sonoma Valley Unified School District
- Twin Hills Union School District
- Two Rock Union School District
- Waugh School District
- West Side Union School District (Sonoma County)
- West Sonoma County Union High School District
- Wilmar Union School District
- Windsor Unified School District
- Wright Elementary School District

== Stanislaus County ==
- Ceres Unified School District
- Chatom Union School District
- Denair Unified School District
- Empire Union School District
- Gratton School District
- Hart-Ransom Union School District
- Hickman Community Charter School District
- Hughson Unified School District
- Keyes Union School District
- Knights Ferry Elementary School District
- Modesto City Elementary School District
- Modesto City High School District
- Newman-Crows Landing Unified School District
- Oakdale Joint Unified School District
- Paradise Elementary School District
- Patterson Joint Unified School District
- Riverbank Unified School District
- Roberts Ferry Union School District
- Salida Union School District
- Shiloh School District
- Stanislaus Union School District
- Sylvan Union School District
- Turlock School Districts
- Valley Home Joint School District
- Waterford Unified School District

== Sutter County ==
- Brittan Elementary School District
- Browns Elementary School District
- East Nicolaus Joint Union High School District
- Franklin Elementary School District
- Live Oak Unified School District
- Marcum-Illinois Union Elementary School District
- Meridian Elementary School District
- Nuestro Elementary School District
- Pleasant Grove Joint Union Elementary School District
- Sutter Union High School District
- Winship-Robbins Elementary School District
- Yuba City Unified School District

== Tehama County ==
- Antelope School District
- Corning Union Elementary School District
- Corning Union High School District
- Evergreen Union School District
- Flournoy Union School District
- Gerber Union Elementary School District
- Kirkwood School District (California)
- Lassen View Union Elementary School District
- Los Molinos Unified School District
- Red Bluff Union Elementary School District
- Red Bluff Joint Union High School District
- Reeds Creek Elementary School District
- Richfield Elementary School District

== Trinity County ==
- Burnt Ranch Elementary School District
- Coffee Creek Elementary School District
- Douglas City Elementary School District
- Junction City School District
- Lewiston Elementary School District
- Mountain Valley Unified School District
- Southern Trinity Joint Unified School District
- Trinity Alps Unified School District
- Trinity Center School District

== Tulare County ==
- Allensworth School District
- Alpaugh Unified School District
- Alta Vista School District
- Buena Vista Elementary School District
- Burton School District
- Columbine School District
- Cutler-Orosi Unified School District
- Dinuba Unified School District
- Ducor School District
- Earlimart School District
- Exeter Unified School District
- Farmersville Unified School District
- Hope School District
- Hot Springs Elementary School District
- Kings River School District
- Liberty School District
- Lindsay Unified School District
- Monson-Sultana School District
- Oak Valley School District
- Outside Creek School District
- Palo Verde School District
- Pixley School District
- Pleasant View School District
- Porterville Unified School District
- Richgrove School District
- Rockford School District
- Saucelito School District
- Sequoia Union School District
- Springville School District
- Stone Corral School District
- Strathmore School District
- Sundale School District
- Sunnyside School District
- Terra Bella School District
- Three Rivers Union School District
- Tipton School District
- Traver School District
- Tulare City School District
- Tulare High School District
- Visalia Unified School District
- Waukena School District
- Woodlake Unified School District
- Woodville School District

== Tuolumne County ==
- Belleview School District
- Big Oak Flat-Groveland Unified School District
- Columbia Union School District
- Curtis Creek School District
- Jamestown School District
- Sonora School District
- Sonora Union High School District
- Soulsbyville School District
- Summerville School District
- Summerville Union High School District
- Twain Harte-Long Barn Union School District

== Ventura County ==
- Briggs Elementary School District
- Conejo Valley Unified School District
- Fillmore Unified School District
- Hueneme Elementary School District
- Mesa Union School District
- Moorpark Unified School District
- Mupu School District
- Oak Park Unified School District
- Ocean View Elementary School District
- Ojai Unified School District
- Oxnard Elementary School District
- Oxnard Union High School District
- Pleasant Valley School District
- Rio School District
- Santa Clara Elementary School District
- Santa Paula Unified School District
- Simi Valley Unified School District
- Somis Union School District
- Ventura Unified School District

== Yolo County ==
- Davis Joint Unified School District
- Esparto School District
- Washington Unified School District
- Winters Joint Unified School District
- Woodland Joint Unified School District

== Yuba County ==
- Camptonville School District
- Marysville Joint Unified School District
- Plumas Elementary School District
- Wheatland Elementary School District
- Wheatland Union High School District

== See also ==
- Education in the United States
- Lists of school districts in the United States
- List of closed secondary schools in California
