= List of school districts in Sonoma County, California =

List of school districts in Sonoma County, California. Statistics are as of the 2008–09 academic year.

- Cazadero area:
  - Fort Ross (K-8, 1 school, 40 students, website)
  - Montgomery (K-8, 1 school, 38 students)
- Cloverdale Unified (K-12, 5 schools, 1520 students, website)
- Cotati-Rohnert Park Unified (K-12, 13 schools, 6,654 students)
- Forestville Union (K-8, 2 schools, 486 students, website)
- Geyserville Unified (K-12, 5 schools, 273 students, website)
- Guerneville (K-8, 2 schools, 302 students, website)
- Harmony Union (K-8, 3 schools, 834 students)
- Healdsburg area:
  - Alexander Valley Union (K-6, 1 school, 120 students, website)
  - Healdsburg Unified (K-12, 4 schools, 2,267 students, website)
  - West Side Union (K-6, 1 school, 163 students, website)
- Horicon (K-8, 1 school, 86 students)
- Kashia (K-8, 1 school, 11 students)
- Kenwood (K-6, 1 school, 153 students, website)
- Monte Rio Union (K-8, 1 school, 104 students, website)
- Petaluma area:
  - Cinnabar (K-6, 1 school, 205 students, website)
  - Dunham (K-6, 1 school, 174 students, website)
  - Liberty (K-6, 2 schools, 635 students, website)
  - Old Adobe Union (K-6, 5 schools, 1,832 students, website)
  - Petaluma City Schools (website):
    - Petaluma City (Elementary) (K-6, 8 schools, 2,272 students)
    - Petaluma Joint Union High (7-12, 10 schools, 5,731 students)
  - Two Rock Union (K-6, 1 school, 152 students, website)
  - Waugh (K-6, 2 schools, 899 students, website)
  - Wilmar Union (K-6, 1 school, 224 students, website)
- Santa Rosa area:
  - Bellevue Union (K-6, 4 schools, 1,725 students, website)
  - Bennett Valley Union (K-6, 2 schools, 951 students, website)
  - Mark West Union (K-6, 4 schools, 1,421 students, website)
  - Oak Grove Union (K-8, 2 schools, 722 students, website)
  - Piner-Olivet Union (K-8, 6 schools, 1,683 students)
  - Rincon Valley Union (K-6, 9 schools, 2,965 students, website)
  - Roseland (K-12, 3 schools, 1,994 students, website)
  - Santa Rosa City Schools:
    - Santa Rosa City (Elementary) (K-6, 14 schools, 4,734 students)
    - Santa Rosa City High (7-12, 19 schools, 11,964 students)
  - Wright (K-6, 3 schools, 1,435 students, website)
- Sebastopol area:
  - Gravenstein Union (K-8, 2 schools, 508 students, website)
  - Sebastopol Union (K-8, 4 schools, 1,173 students, website)
  - Twin Hills Union (K-8, 4 schools, 908 students, website)
  - West Sonoma County Union High (9-12, 5 schools, 2,435 students, website)
- Sonoma Valley Unified (K-12, 12 schools, 4,793 students, website)
- Windsor Unified (K-12, 8 schools, 5,344 students)

== See also ==
- List of school districts in California by county
