= Petaluma City Schools =

School district in California

Address
- 200 Douglas Street Petaluma, California, 94952; United States

District information
- Type: Public
- Grades: K–12
- Superintendent: Matthew Harris
- Asst. superintendent(s): Tony Hua (Ed Services), Maite Iturri (Student Services), Jason Sutter (Human Resources), Christ Thomas (Chief Business Official)
- NCES District ID: 0630230

Students and staff
- Students: 2,144 (2020–2021)
- Teachers: 103.81 (FTE)
- Staff: 140.64 (FTE)
- Student–teacher ratio: 20.65:1

Other information
- Website: www.petalumacityschools.org

Petaluma City Schools is a school district in Petaluma composed of the Petaluma Joint Union High District and the Petaluma City Elementary district. Petaluma City Schools has a total of 7,493 students enrolled as of 2016 with 2,379 students enrolled in Petaluma City Elementary district and 5,397 students enrolled in Petaluma Joint Union High District. Eight other elementary school districts, Cinnabar, Dunham, Laguna Joint, Liberty, Old Adobe, Two Rock Union, Waugh, Wilmar Union, feed into the high school district.

The elementary school district covers much of Petaluma and the Penngrove census-designated place. The high school district additionally covers the rest of Petaluma, as well as Petaluma Center.

== Secondary schools ==
=== High schools ===
- Casa Grande High School
- Petaluma High School

=== Alternative schools ===
- Carpe Diem High School
- Crossroads Community Day School
- San Antonio High School
- Sonoma Mountain High School
- Valley Oaks

=== Junior high schools ===
- Kenilworth Junior High School
- Petaluma Junior High School

== Elementary schools ==
=== Elementary schools ===
- Grant Elementary School
- McDowell Elementary School
- McKinley Elementary School
- McNear Elementary School
- Valley Vista Elementary School

=== Charter schools ===
- 6th Grade Academy
- Mary Collins School at Cherry Valley
- Penngrove Elementary School
- Petaluma Accelerated Charter Academy
