= Bill Mooneyham =

American baseball player (born 1960)

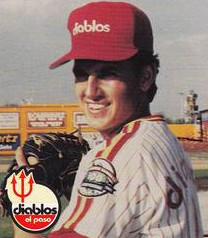
- Mooneyham in 1988
- Pitcher
- Born: August 16, 1960 (age 65); Livermore, California, U.S.
- Batted: Right Threw: Right

MLB debut
- April 19, 1986, for the Oakland Athletics

Last MLB appearance
- September 30, 1986, for the Oakland Athletics

MLB statistics
- Win–loss record: 4–5
- Earned run average: 4.52
- Strikeouts: 75
- Stats at Baseball Reference

Teams
- Oakland Athletics (1986)

William Craig Mooneyham (born August 16, 1960) is an American former professional baseball pitcher for the Oakland Athletics of the Major League Baseball (MLB).

Mooneyham attended Merced College. He was originally drafted in 1980 Major League Baseball draft in the 1st round (10th overall), and made his MLB debut on April 19, 1986, with Oakland. He played for only one season in MLB, for which he was paid $60,000.

In the minor leagues he played for the Salinas Spurs of the Class A California League in 1980 and the Holyoke Millers of the class AA Eastern League in 1981. He also played for Edmonton, Nashua, Modesto, Huntsville and Tacoma.

He worked as a Physical Education teacher at Weaver Middle School in Merced, California until 2022, when he retired.
