= Hillcrest Middle School =

Hillcrest Middle School may refer to:

- Hillcrest Middle School, School District 43 Coquitlam
- Hillcrest Middle School, Deer Valley Unified School District
- Hillcrest Middle School, Gravenstein Union School District
- Hillcrest Middle School, Greenville County Schools
- Hillcrest Middle School, Trumbull, Connecticut
- Hillcrest Middle School, Tuscaloosa County School System
- Hillcrest Middle School, Ysleta Independent School District
