= Sand City, California =

City in California, United States

- City
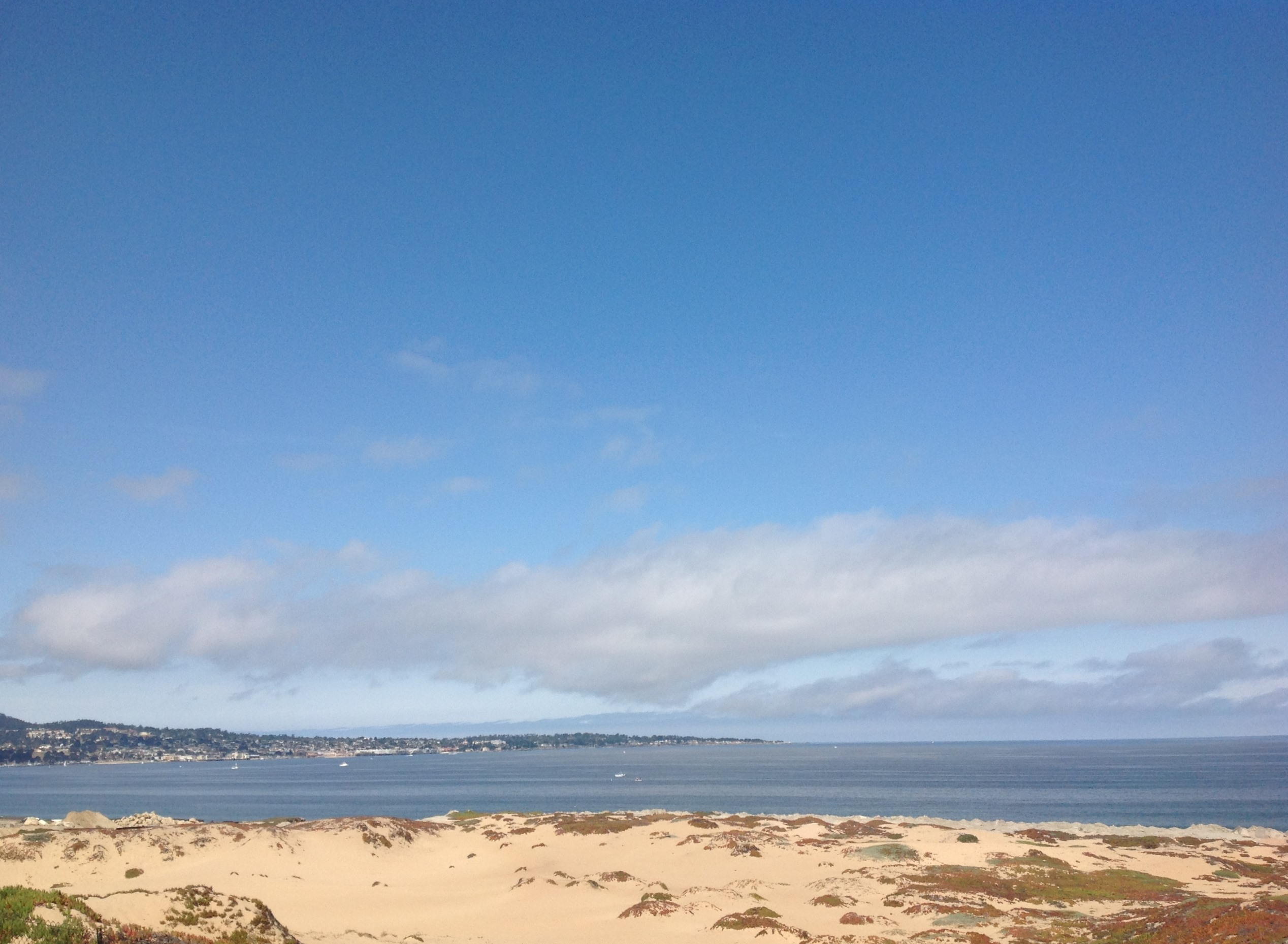
- Sand City Beach

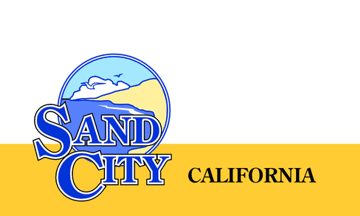
- Flag
- Interactive map of Sand City, California
- Location in the United States
- Coordinates: 36°37′02″N 121°50′54″W
- Country: United States
- State: California
- County: Monterey
- Incorporated: May 31, 1960

Government
  - Mayor: Mary Ann Carbone
  - State Senator: John Laird (D)
  - CA Assembly: Dawn Addis (D)
  - U. S. Rep.: Jimmy Panetta (D)

Area
  - Total: 2.91 sq mi (7.5 km^{2})
  - Land: 0.55 sq mi (1.4 km^{2})
  - Water: 2.36 sq mi (6.1 km^{2}) 81.21%
- Elevation: 72 ft (22 m)

Population (2020)
  - Total: 325
  - Density: 594.15/sq mi (229.40/km^{2})
- Time zone: UTC-8 (PST)
  - Summer (DST): UTC-7 (PDT)
- ZIP code: 93955
- Area code: 831
- FIPS code: 06-65112
- GNIS feature ID: 1652820
- Website: www.sandcity.org

Sand City is a city in Monterey County, California, United States, located on the shores of Monterey Bay, and surrounded on most sides by the larger city of Seaside. Sand City is located 2 miles (3 km) northeast of Monterey, at an elevation of 72 feet (22 m). The population was 325 at the 2020 census. The city is predominantly a business community, and has a number of larger retail stores. The West End area of Sand City, once an industrial area, hosts a growing artists' colony. Every August, the artists of Sand City and neighboring areas hold a street fair called the "West End Celebration".

== Geography ==
According to the United States Census Bureau, the city has a total area of 2.9 square miles (7.5 km^{2}), of which 0.5 square miles (1.3 km^{2}) are land and 2.4 square miles (6.2 km^{2}), or 81.21%, are water, where the city limits extend into Monterey Bay.

== History ==
Sand City incorporated in 1960. The Sand City post office opened in 1961, but has now been combined with the Seaside post office and shares Seaside's ZIP code (93955) as well. The city is mostly industrial.

== Demographics ==
Historical population
| Census | Pop. | Note | %± |
|---|---|---|---|
| 1970 | 212 | | — |
| 1980 | 182 | | −14.2% |
| 1990 | 192 | | 5.5% |
| 2000 | 261 | | 35.9% |
| 2010 | 334 | | 28.0% |
| 2020 | 325 | | −2.7% |
U.S. Decennial Census

=== 2020 ===
The 2020 United States census reported that Sand City had a population of 325. The population density was 594.1 inhabitants per square mile (229.4/km^{2}). The racial makeup of Sand City was 174 (53.5%) White, 17 (5.2%) African American, 7 (2.2%) Native American, 19 (5.8%) Asian, 3 (0.9%) Pacific Islander, 49 (15.1%) from other races, and 56 (17.2%) from two or more races. Hispanic or Latino of any race were 96 persons (29.5%).

The whole population lived in households. There were 163 households, out of which 33 (20.2%) had children under the age of 18 living in them, 41 (25.2%) were married-couple households, 18 (11.0%) were cohabiting couple households, 43 (26.4%) had a female householder with no partner present, and 61 (37.4%) had a male householder with no partner present. 73 households (44.8%) were one person, and 17 (10.4%) were one person aged 65 or older. The average household size was 1.99. There were 74 families (45.4% of all households).

The age distribution was 47 people (14.5%) under the age of 18, 28 people (8.6%) aged 18 to 24, 100 people (30.8%) aged 25 to 44, 106 people (32.6%) aged 45 to 64, and 44 people (13.5%) who were 65 years of age or older. The median age was 42.4 years. For every 100 females, there were 115.2 males.

There were 186 housing units at an average density of 340.0 units per square mile (131.3 units/km^{2}), of which 163 (87.6%) were occupied. Of these, 30 (18.4%) were owner-occupied, and 133 (81.6%) were occupied by renters.

=== 2010 ===
At the 2010 census Sand City had a population of 334. The population density was 114.2 inhabitants per square mile (44.1/km^{2}). The racial makeup of Sand City was 223 (66.8%) White, 13 (3.9%) African American, 3 (0.9%) Native American, 16 (4.8%) Asian, 1 (0.3%) Pacific Islander, 61 (18.3%) from other races, and 17 (5.1%) from two or more races. Hispanic or Latino of any race were 123 people (36.8%).

The census reported that 291 people (87.1% of the population) lived in households, 43 (12.9%) lived in non-institutionalized group quarters, and no one was institutionalized.

There were 128 households, 37 (28.9%) had children under the age of 18 living in them, 43 (33.6%) were opposite-sex married couples living together, 12 (9.4%) had a female householder with no husband present, 4 (3.1%) had a male householder with no wife present. There were 16 (12.5%) unmarried opposite-sex partnerships, and 0 (0%) same-sex married couples or partnerships. 42 households (32.8%) were one person and 3 (2.3%) had someone living alone who was 65 or older. The average household size was 2.27. There were 59 families (46.1% of households); the average family size was 2.98.

The age distribution was 59 people (17.7%) under the age of 18, 33 people (9.9%) aged 18 to 24, 147 people (44.0%) aged 25 to 44, 86 people (25.7%) aged 45 to 64, and 9 people (2.7%) who were 65 or older. The median age was 34.1 years. For every 100 females, there were 124.2 males. For every 100 females age 18 and over, there were 139.1 males.

There were 145 housing units at an average density of 49.6 per square mile, of the occupied units 18 (14.1%) were owner-occupied and 110 (85.9%) were rented. The homeowner vacancy rate was 10.0%; the rental vacancy rate was 7.4%. 45 people (13.5% of the population) lived in owner-occupied housing units and 246 people (73.7%) lived in rental housing units.

=== 2000 ===
At the 2000 census, the median income for a household in the city was $34,375, and the median family income was $37,500. Males had a median income of $27,500 versus $30,000 for females. The per capita income for the city was $15,455. About 17.9% of families and 27.9% of the population were below the poverty line, including 17.9% of those under the age of eighteen and 50.0% of those sixty five or over.

== See also ==
- Coastal California
- List of school districts in Monterey County, California
- List of tourist attractions in Monterey County, California
