= Konocti =

Konocti may refer to:

- Mount Konocti
- Konocti Harbor
- Konocti Unified School District
