= Guadalupe Union School District =

School district in California, United States

Address
- 4465 Ninth St. Guadalupe, California, 93434; United States

District information
- Type: Public
- Grades: K–8
- NCES District ID: 0616260

Students and staff
- Students: 1,270 (2020–2021)
- Teachers: 58.8 (FTE)
- Staff: 158.0 (FTE)
- Student–teacher ratio: 21.6:1

Other information
- Website: www.guadusd.org

Guadalupe School District is a school district in Guadalupe, California, in northwestern Santa Barbara County. The district is composed of two schools, Mary Buren School (K-5) and Kermit McKenzie Junior High School (6-8) and there are 1157 students enrolled in this school district.

It is bordered on the east by the Santa Maria-Bonita Elementary School District, on the southeast by the Orcutt Union Elementary School District, and on the south by the Casmalia Elementary School District.

== See also ==
- List of school districts in Santa Barbara County, California
