= Buena Vista School District =

Buena Vista School District may refer to:

- Buena Vista Elementary School District, a public elementary school district in Tulare, California
- Buena Vista School District (Michigan), a former public school district in Buena Vista Charter Township, Michigan
- Panama Buena Vista Union School District, a public elementary school district in Bakersfield, California

== See also ==
- Buena Vista School
