= Pacific Union School District =

Pacific Union School District may refer to:

- Pacific Union School District (Arcata, California)
- Pacific Union School District (Fresno County, California)
