= List of school districts in Monterey County, California =

List of school districts in Monterey County, California

On February 27, 2008, Arnold Schwarzenegger and Superintendent of Public Instruction, Jack O'Connell placed several school districts in the county in their list of school districts that need help due to the school's failure to raise their Standardized Testing and Reporting (STAR) Results under the No Child Left Behind Act for the past five years.

- Alisal Union Elementary School District ^{1}
- Bradley Union Elementary School District
- Carmel Unified School District
- Chualar Union Elementary School District
- Gonzales Union Elementary School District
- Gonzales Union High School District
- Graves Elementary School District
- Greenfield Union Elementary School District ^{2}
- South Monterey County Joint Union High School District
- King City Union Elementary School District ^{1}
- Lagunita Elementary School District
- Mission Union Elementary School District
- Monterey Peninsula Unified School District ^{1}
- North Monterey County Unified School District
- Pacific Grove Unified School District
- Big Sur Unified School District
- Salinas City Elementary School District ^{1}
- Salinas Union High School District
- San Antonio Union Elementary School District
- San Ardo Union Elementary School District
- San Lucas Union Elementary School District
- Santa Rita Union Elementary School District
- Soledad Unified School District
- Spreckels Union Elementary School District
- Washington Union School District

^{1} These districts were placed under "Moderate" help by the Governor.

^{2} This district was placed under "Intensive" help by the Governor.
