= Guadalupe, California =

City in California, United States

- City
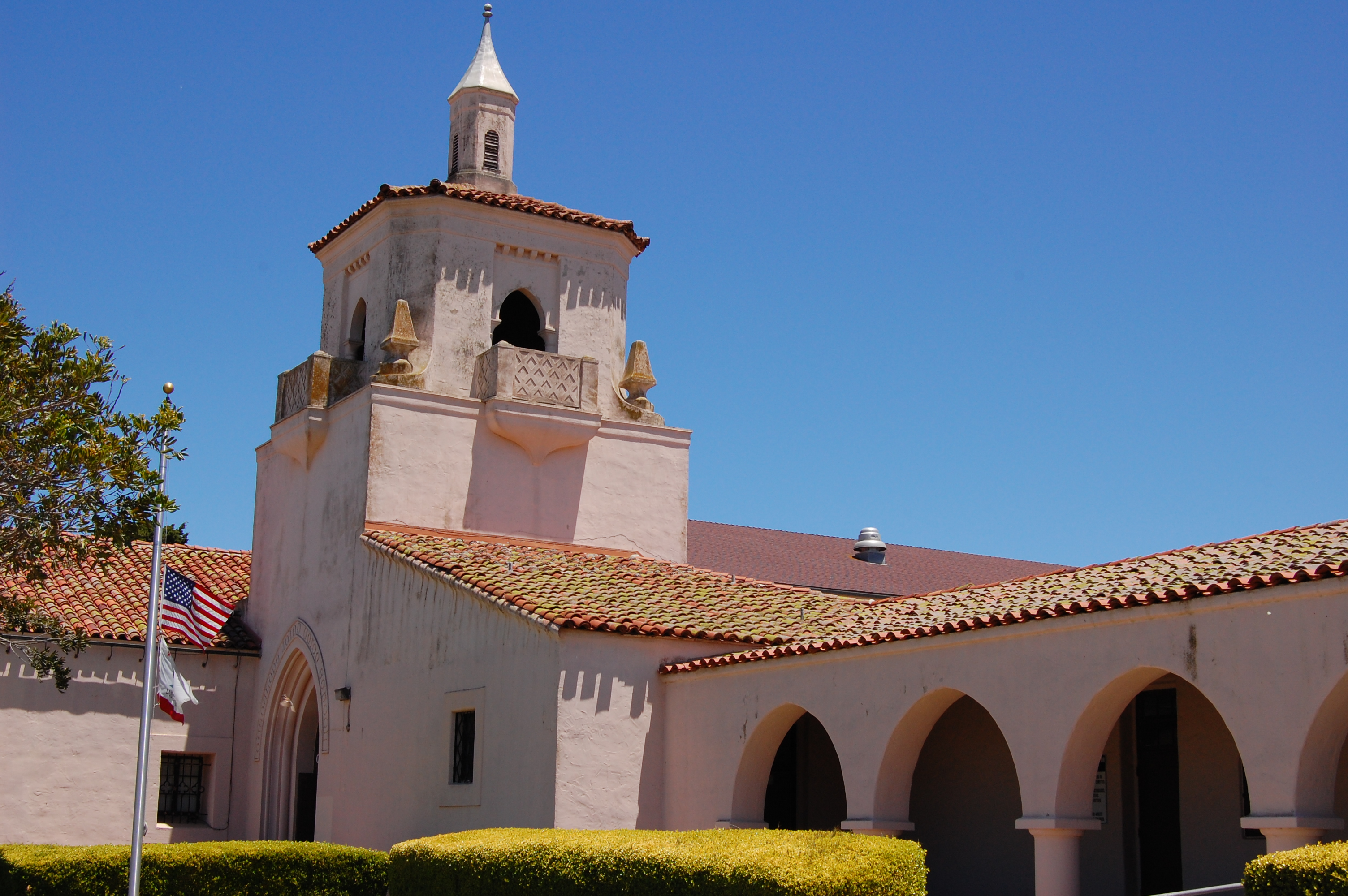
- Guadalupe City Hall
- Motto: "Gateway to the Dunes!"
- Interactive map of Guadalupe, California
- Location within California Location within the United States
- Coordinates: 34°57′56″N 120°34′23″W
- Country: United States
- State: California
- County: Santa Barbara
- Incorporated: August 3, 1946

Government
  - Mayor: Ariston Julian
  - State senator: Monique Limón (D)
  - Assemblymember: Gregg Hart (D)
  - U. S. rep.: Salud Carbajal (D)

Area
  - Total: 1.32 sq mi (3.41 km^{2})
  - Land: 1.31 sq mi (3.39 km^{2})
  - Water: 0.0039 sq mi (0.01 km^{2}) 0.32%
- Elevation: 85 ft (26 m)

Population (2020)
  - Total: 8,057
  - Density: 6,160/sq mi (2,380/km^{2})
- Time zone: UTC-08:00 (PST)
  - Summer (DST): UTC-07:00 (PDT)
- ZIP Code: 93434
- Area code: 805
- FIPS code: 06-31414
- GNIS feature IDs: 1652715, 2410672
- Website: cityofguadalupe.org

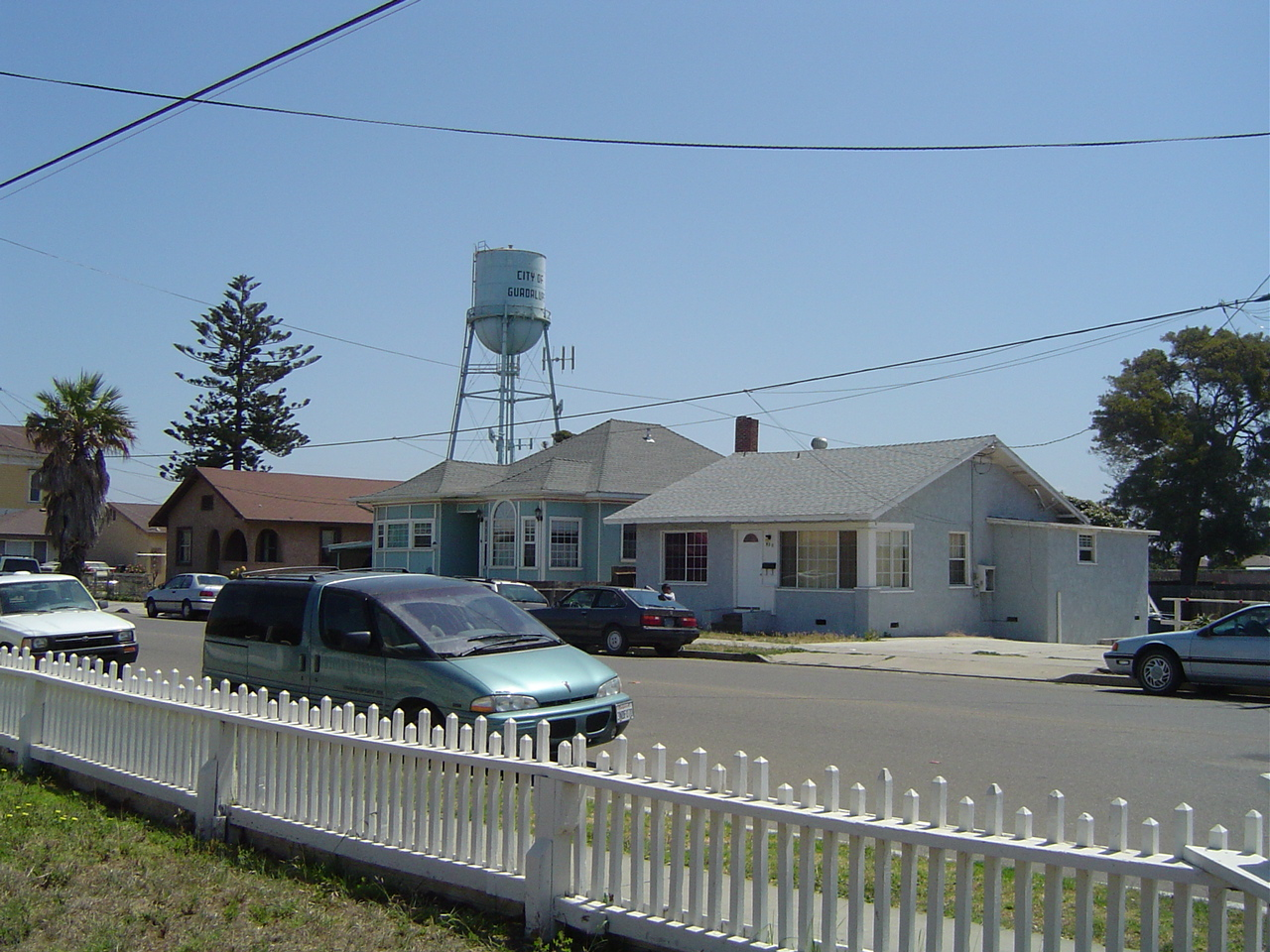
Residential area, circa 2005. The water tower in the background, built in 1928, was damaged by the 2003 San Simeon earthquake and was replaced in 2009.

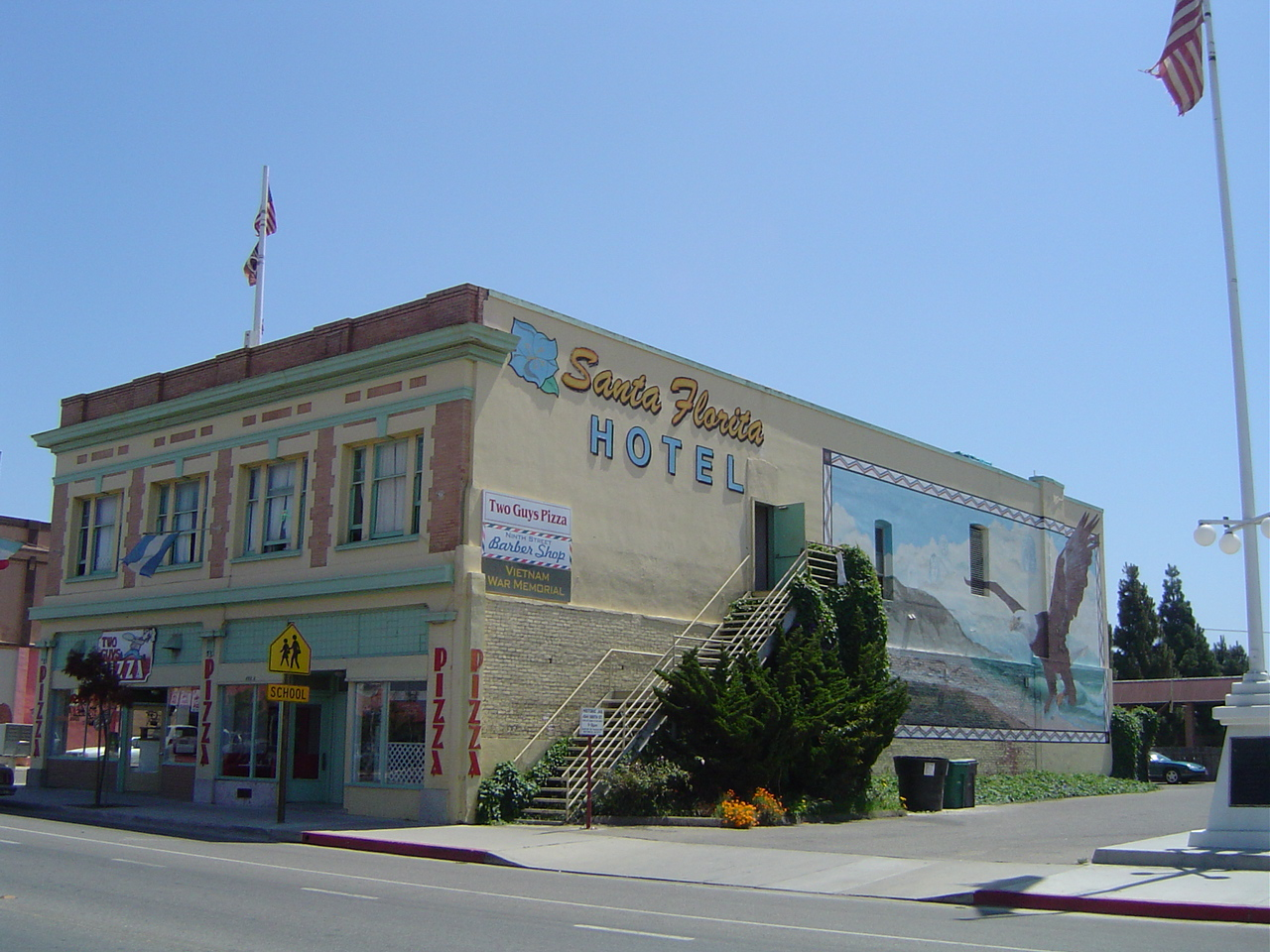
Lodgings along Highway 1, which bisects the city, circa 2005

Guadalupe is a small city located in Santa Barbara County, California, United States. According to the 2020 census, the city had a population of 8,057. Guadalupe is economically and socially tied to the city of Santa Maria, which is approximately eight miles (13 km) to the east. It is located at the intersection of Highway 1 and Highway 166, immediately south of the Santa Maria River, and five miles (8 km) east of the Pacific Ocean.

== History ==
The first European land exploration of Alta California, the Spanish Portolá expedition, camped near today's Guadalupe on September 1, 1769. Franciscan missionary and expedition member Juan Crespí noted in his diary that they found "a very large lake". The lake has since mostly filled in, leaving a low-lying plain traversed by the Santa Maria River and several tributaries.

When Mission La Purisima was established in 1787, the area became part of the mission's pasture land. In 1840, following secularization of the missions by the Mexican government and subsequent issuance of land grants, the area became part of the Rancho Guadalupe land grant. Rancho Guadalupe was first settled by pioneers of Mexican and Spanish descent, and later, other immigrants from many unique backgrounds followed, such as the Anglo Americans, Japanese, Chinese, and Filipinos. The small town was incorporated as the city of Guadalupe on May 19, 1946. The city name honors Our Lady of Guadalupe, which is the Catholic title given to the Virgin Mary.

An ongoing construction development along the south side of town will add more than 800 homes. The project, Pasadera Homes, was first announced in 1993 and has undergone several delays. The city annexed the 209-acre site (85 ha) in 1995. When completed, it is expected to boost the city's population to the 10,000 that is considered the threshold for attracting chain stores and restaurants. In addition to homes, the plan includes a new school and commercial development.

The city faced economic troubles in the late 2000s and early 2010s; in 2015, a grand jury urged the city to dissolve. Voters overwhelmingly approved the passage of three new tax and fee measures, which, along with the aforementioned residential and commercial developments, helped stabilize the city's economy.

== Geography ==
Guadalupe is located in the northwestern extremity of Santa Barbara County, immediately south of the Santa Maria River. The landscape in the vicinity of the town is mostly flat, with the predominant land uses being agriculture and oil production. Hills rise to the south of the town; on the other side of the hills is Vandenberg Space Force Base. West of town, both in Santa Barbara County and north in adjacent San Luis Obispo County, is the Guadalupe-Nipomo Dunes, a large region of dune habitat along the Pacific Ocean shore. The Guadalupe-Nipomo Dunes Center serves as the education and research facility for the natural area.

According to the United States Census Bureau, the city has a total area of 1.3 square miles (3.4 km^{2}), of which 99.68% is land and 0.32% is water. The town consists of a tight cluster of buildings, surrounded completely by agricultural land.

=== Climate ===
This region experiences mildly warm and dry summers, with no average monthly temperatures above 71.6 °F. According to the Köppen Climate Classification system, Guadalupe has a warm-summer Mediterranean climate, abbreviated "Csb" on climate maps.

Climate data for Guadalupe, California
Month	Jan	Feb	Mar	Apr	May	Jun	Jul	Aug	Sep	Oct	Nov	Dec	Year
Record high °F (°C)	85 (29)	89 (32)	91 (33)	98 (37)	102 (39)	109 (43)	104 (40)	95 (35)	106 (41)	104 (40)	94 (34)	92 (33)	109 (43)
Mean daily maximum °F (°C)	62.2 (16.8)	63.0 (17.2)	64.1 (17.8)	66.6 (19.2)	68.4 (20.2)	70.3 (21.3)	71.6 (22.0)	72.8 (22.7)	73.2 (22.9)	72.0 (22.2)	67.7 (19.8)	62.4 (16.9)	67.9 (19.9)
Mean daily minimum °F (°C)	41.6 (5.3)	43.2 (6.2)	44.6 (7.0)	45.6 (7.6)	48.2 (9.0)	51.3 (10.7)	54.0 (12.2)	54.5 (12.5)	53.6 (12.0)	50.1 (10.1)	45.2 (7.3)	40.9 (4.9)	47.7 (8.7)
Record low °F (°C)	21 (−6)	20 (−7)	23 (−5)	28 (−2)	27 (−3)	35 (2)	31 (−1)	40 (4)	32 (0)	28 (−2)	21 (−6)	22 (−6)	20 (−7)
Average precipitation inches (mm)	3.23 (82)	3.48 (88)	3.19 (81)	0.98 (25)	0.35 (8.9)	0.05 (1.3)	0.03 (0.76)	0.04 (1.0)	0.31 (7.9)	0.60 (15)	1.40 (36)	2.29 (58)	15.95 (405)
Source 1:
Source 2:

== Demographics ==
Historical population
Census	Pop.	Note	%±
1880	174		—
1950	2,429		—
1960	2,614		7.6%
1970	3,145		20.3%
1980	3,629		15.4%
1990	5,479		51.0%
2000	5,659		3.3%
2010	7,080		25.1%
2020	8,057		13.8%
U.S. Decennial Census; 1860–1870 1880-1890; 1900 1910 1920; 1930 1940 1950; 1960 1970 1980; 1990 2000 2010; 2020

=== 2020 census ===
As of the 2020 census, Guadalupe had a population of 8,057. The population density was 6,150.4 inhabitants per square mile (2,374.7/km^{2}). The age distribution was 31.2% under the age of 18, 10.8% aged 18 to 24, 28.1% aged 25 to 44, 20.0% aged 45 to 64, and 9.9% who were 65 years of age or older. The median age was 30.2 years. For every 100 females there were 99.8 males, and for every 100 females age 18 and over there were 100.9 males age 18 and over.

The Census reported that the whole population lived in households. 99.9% of residents lived in urban areas, while 0.1% lived in rural areas.

There were 2,063 households in Guadalupe, of which 57.8% had children under the age of 18 living in them. Of all households, 53.4% were married-couple households, 9.3% were cohabiting couple households, 13.9% were households with a male householder and no spouse or partner present, and 23.5% were households with a female householder and no spouse or partner present. About 9.1% of all households were made up of individuals and 4.6% had someone living alone who was 65 years of age or older. The average household size was 3.91. There were 1,764 families (85.5% of all households).

There were 2,119 housing units at an average density of 1,617.6 units per square mile (624.6 units/km^{2}). Of those units, 2,063 (97.4%) were occupied and 2.6% were vacant. Of occupied units, 53.5% were owner-occupied and 46.5% were occupied by renters. The homeowner vacancy rate was 0.4% and the rental vacancy rate was 0.6%.

Racial composition as of the 2020 census
Race	Number	Percent
White	2,205	27.4%
Black or African American	49	0.6%
American Indian and Alaska Native	366	4.5%
Asian	251	3.1%
Native Hawaiian and Other Pacific Islander	15	0.2%
Some other race	3,512	43.6%
Two or more races	1,659	20.6%
Hispanic or Latino (of any race)	7,098	88.1%

=== Demographic estimates ===
In 2023, the US Census Bureau estimated that 30.2% of the population were foreign-born. Of all people aged 5 or older, 29.0% spoke only English at home, 66.3% spoke Spanish, 1.6% spoke Asian or Pacific Islander languages, and 3.2% spoke other languages. Of those aged 25 or older, 57.1% were high school graduates and 11.1% had a bachelor's degree.

=== Income and poverty ===
The median household income in 2023 was $71,048, and the per capita income was $22,110. About 22.2% of families and 28.3% of the population were below the poverty line.

=== 2010 census ===
The 2010 United States census reported that Guadalupe had a population of 7,080. The population density was 5,385.3 inhabitants per square mile (2,079.3/km^{2}). The racial makeup of Guadalupe was 3,395 (48.0%) White, 74 (1.0%) African American, 103 (1.5%) Native American, 279 (3.9%) Asian, 5 (0.1%) Pacific Islander, 2,783 (39.3%) from other races, and 441 (6.2%) from two or more races. Hispanic or Latino of any race were 6,103 persons (86.2%).

The Census reported that 7,080 people (100% of the population) lived in households, 0 (0%) lived in non-institutionalized group quarters, and 0 (0%) were institutionalized.

There were 1,810 households, out of which 1,073 (59.3%) had children under the age of 18 living in them, 1,005 (55.5%) were opposite-sex married couples living together, 369 (20.4%) had a female householder with no husband present, 174 (9.6%) had a male householder with no wife present. There were 143 (7.9%) unmarried opposite-sex partnerships, and 10 (0.6%) same-sex married couples or partnerships. 213 households (11.8%) were made up of individuals, and 93 (5.1%) had someone living alone who was 65 years of age or older. The average household size was 3.91. There were 1,548 families (85.5% of all households); the average family size was 4.11.

The population was spread out, with 2,424 people (34.2%) under the age of 18, 797 people (11.3%) aged 18 to 24, 1,930 people (27.3%) aged 25 to 44, 1,362 people (19.2%) aged 45 to 64, and 567 people (8.0%) who were 65 years of age or older. The median age was 28.2 years. For every 100 females, there were 101.3 males. For every 100 females age 18 and over, there were 97.0 males.

There were 1,887 housing units at an average density of 1,435.3 per square mile (554.2/km^{2}), of which 936 (51.7%) were owner-occupied, and 874 (48.3%) were occupied by renters. The homeowner vacancy rate was 0.4%; the rental vacancy rate was 3.3%. 3,483 people (49.2% of the population) lived in owner-occupied housing units and 3,597 people (50.8%) lived in rental housing units.

== Economy ==
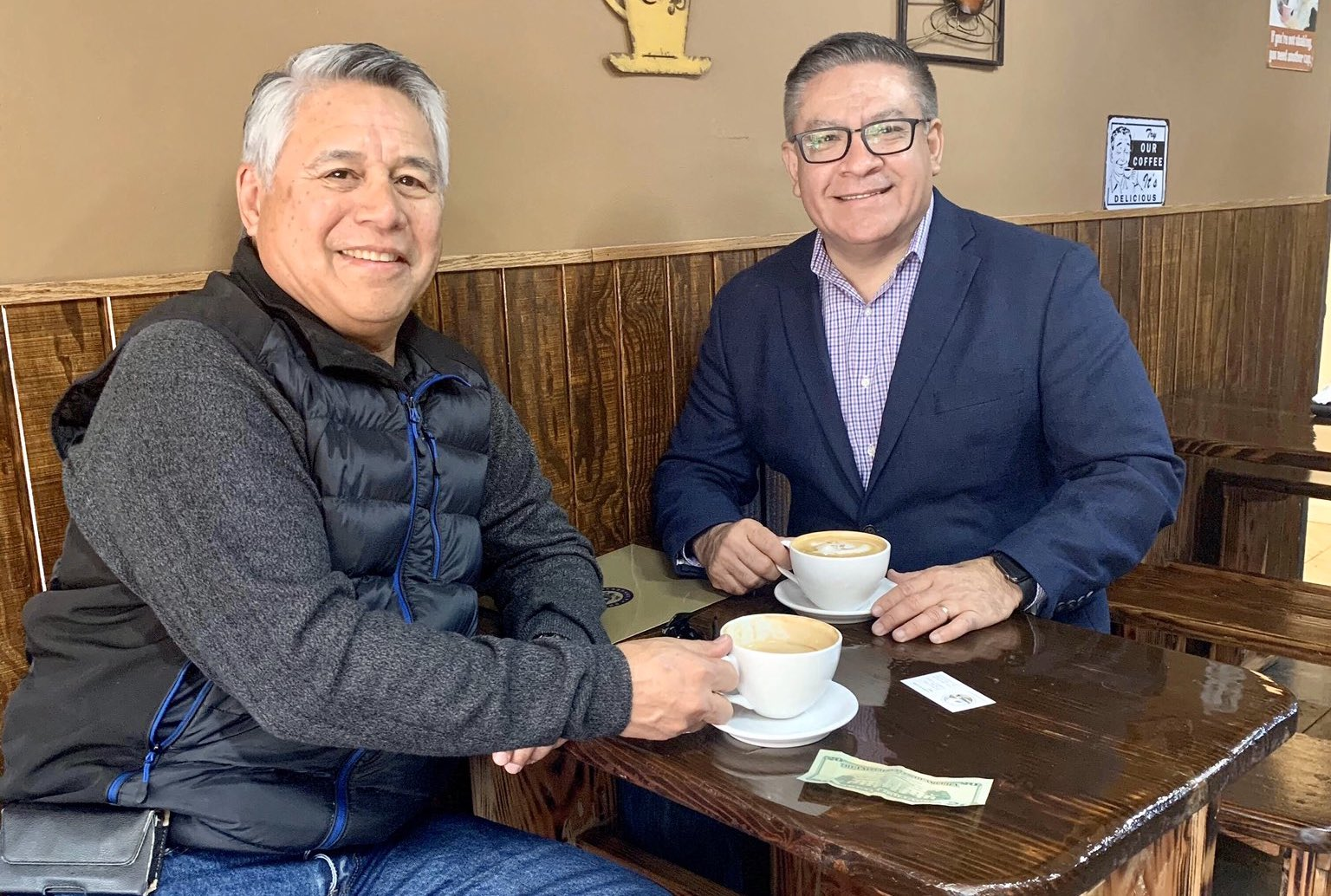
Guadalupe Mayor Arison Julian (left) meets with Congressman Salud Carbajal (right) in 2020.

Agriculture is by far the leading industry in Guadalupe. It has the highest percentage of agricultural- and manufacturing workers in Santa Barbara County: 31% are employed in the agriculture sector, while 24% have manufacturing jobs. Apio Inc. and Obispo Cooling take produce in from the surrounding fields and prepare it for shipping to points across the nation as well as overseas.

The majority of the small businesses in town can be found on Guadalupe Street. For half a century, the city was home to the famous Far Western Tavern (formerly the Palace Hotel), until it relocated to Old Town Orcutt in 2012, following the death of founder and philanthropist Clarence Minetti. The Far Western building has since been donated to the Guadalupe-Nipomo Dunes Center. It was placed on the state's Register of Historic Resources in 2019.

Groceries can be bought at La Chiquita Market and at the historic Masatani's Market, which has been owned and operated by the Masatani family since 1922. There is a public library on Main Street as well as many shops, businesses and services.

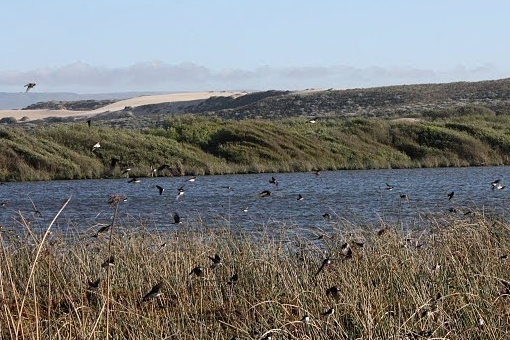
Photo of Oso Flaco Lake, just north of Guadalupe

== Arts and culture ==
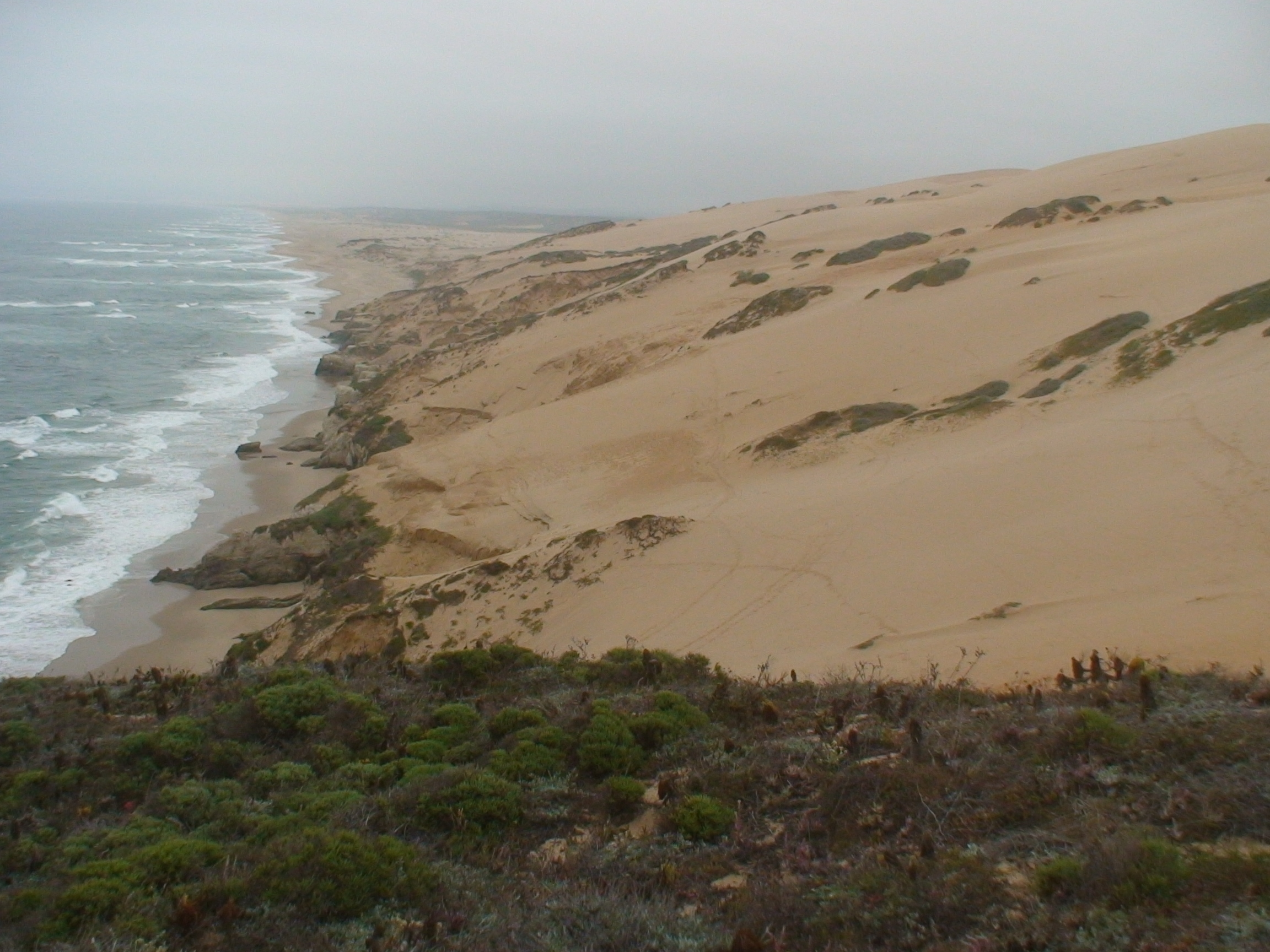
A view of the Guadalupe-Nipomo Dune complex from its southern tip at Mussel Rock.

Guadalupe is a small town with a diverse culture and history. In addition to the Dunes Center, the town contains an art museum, the Rancho de Guadalupe Historical Society, a public library, veteran's memorial, and the Masatani Mansion. Nuestra Señora De Guadalupe is the main Catholic church, located on 11th Street and Obispo Street. There are three other Christian churches in town, as well as a Buddhist temple. The historic building occupied by city hall and the police department used to be an elementary school. There is a very small jail building at the park near the train tracks where the water tower stands. Every year on September 16, there is a parade on Guadalupe Street to celebrate Mexico's independence from Spain.

Guadalupe is also home to the historic Royal Theater, which was a single-screen 510-seat movie theater, located on Highway 1. Built in 1939, the Royal was originally owned and managed by Japanese-American businessmen Arthur Fukuda, Jack Takeuchi, and Kiyozo Noji, who were relocated to internment camps in 1942. The theater was then operated under a number of owners until its closure and acquisition by the city in the 1990s. Since then, there have been several plans to refurbish the building in an effort to revitalize the downtown area. Currently, the city plans to repurpose the building as a community arts center, and to have the site registered as an historic landmark.

Former President and then-Republican Party nominee George W. Bush and his wife Laura paid visit to Guadalupe, eating at La Simpatia restaurant as part of a two-day campaign trip during the 2000 election.

== Parks and recreation ==
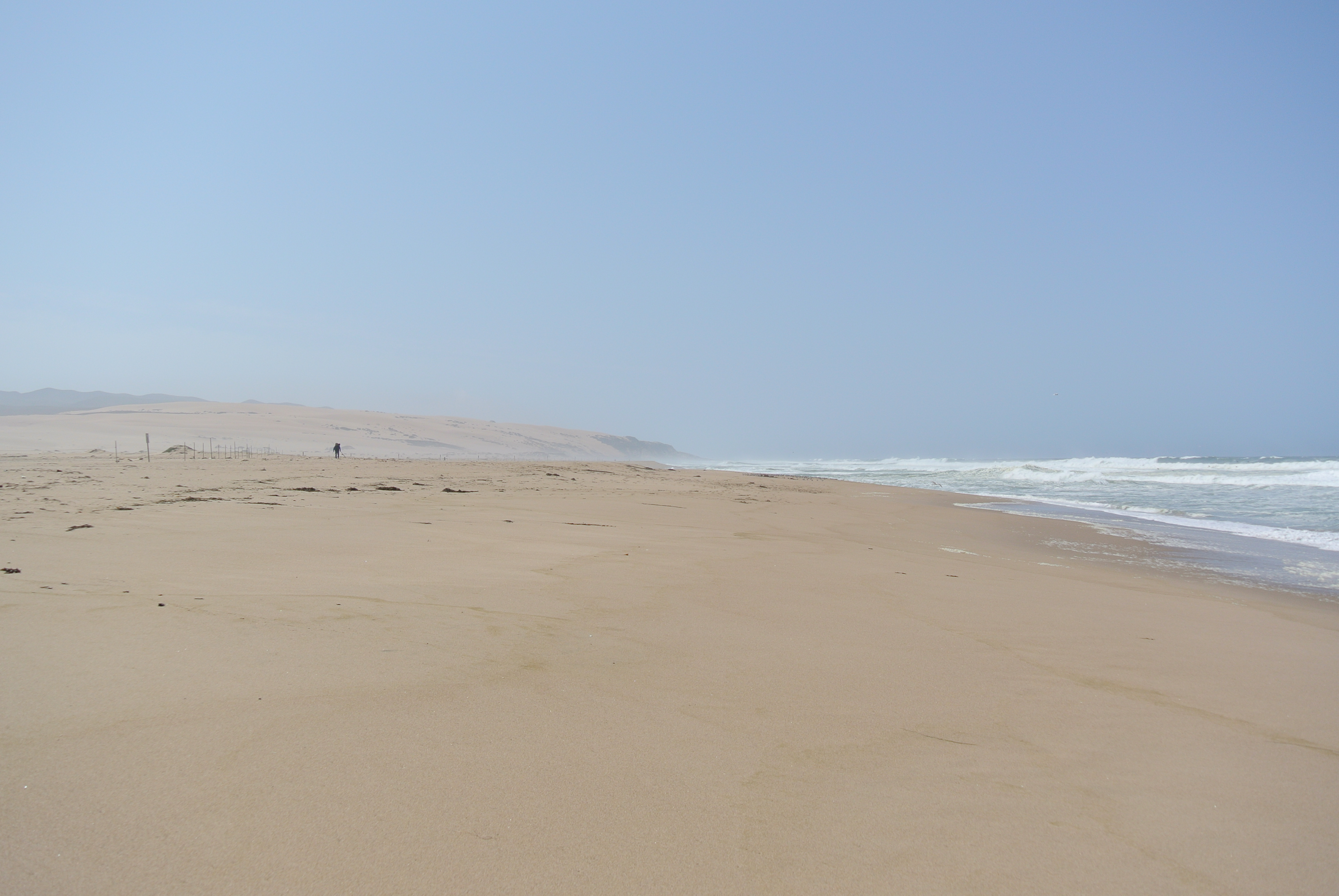
Beach at the Guadalupe Dunes County Park

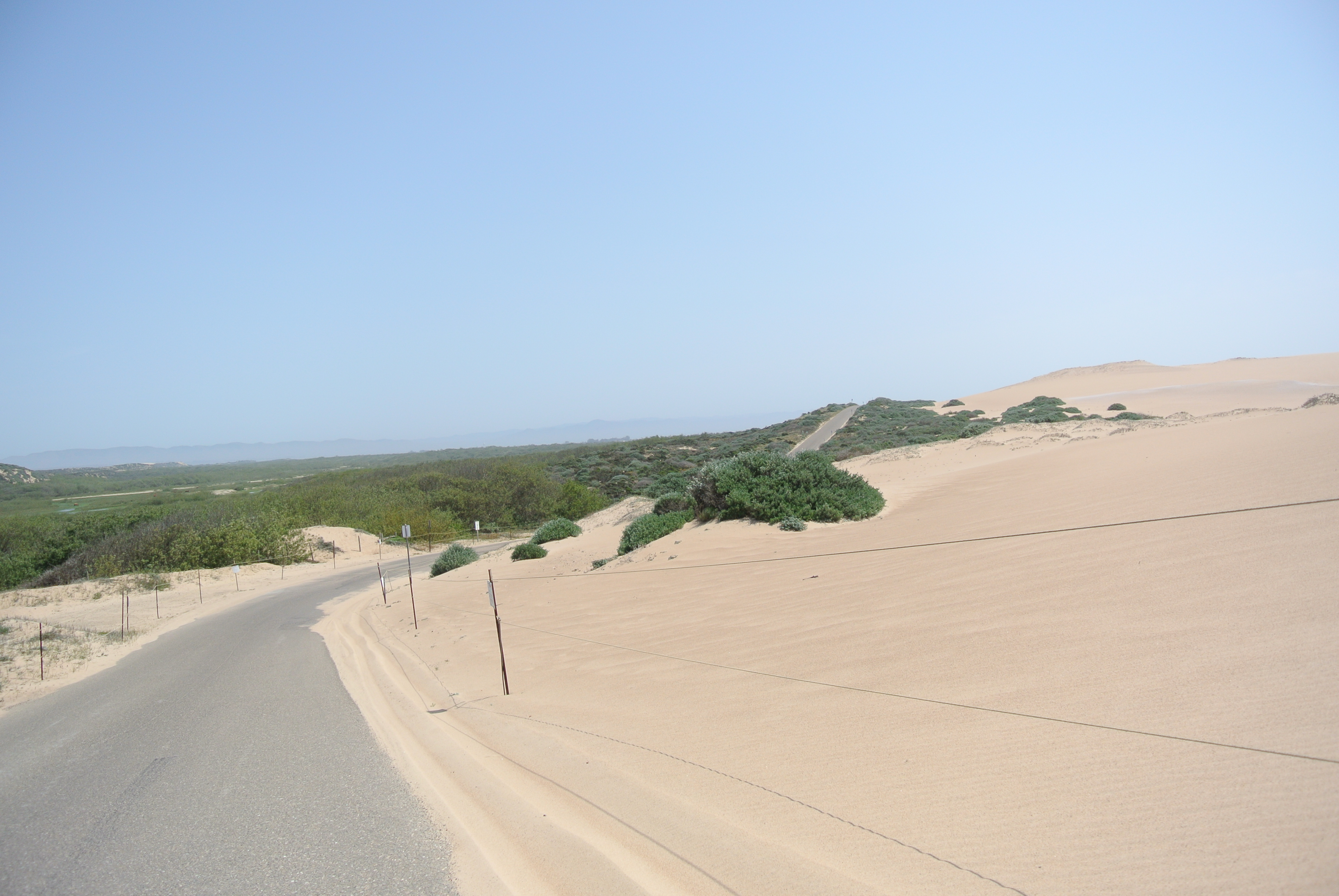
West Main Street and transition zone (back dunes), Guadalupe Dunes County Park

There is a beach near Guadalupe at the end of Main Street that is part of the Guadalupe-Nipomo Dunes. Oso Flaco Lake in Nipomo is also a part of this dunes complex and is a few miles north of Guadalupe; it features a boardwalk that goes over the lake and leads to the Guadalupe beach.

South of Guadalupe on Highway 1 and right on Brown Road is Point Sal Road, which was closed due to heavy storms and has become a hiking trail through the coastal mountains. At the end of the 5-mile trail (8.0 km), which passes through Vandenberg Space Force Base, is the isolated Point Sal State Beach. Between Guadalupe Beach and Point Sal Beach is the even more isolated Paradise Beach, near Mussel Rock.

Parks in the area include Jack O'Connell Park, where the Bulldogs youth football team practices. LeRoy Park, the community center for the city and the home of the local Boys & Girls Club, sits near the town's northern city limit, and is the oldest community park in Santa Barbara County; the land was donated in 1871 by the LeRoy family, and the park is currently undergoing a major revitalization project.

The Guadalupe Wrestling Club was established in 1979 for the youth and has produced numerous state champions over the years. The Guadalupe Police Department runs the Gladiator's club, which provides peer-to-peer mentoring for fifth and sixth grade youth. The Boys & Girls Club and the Riverview apartment tutoring program provide places for children to go after school.

== Education ==
The Guadalupe Union School District operates two schools: Mary Buren Elementary and Kermit McKenzie Junior High School. In state rankings, the two schools are in the 20th percentile. Mary Buren Elementary is kindergarten to fifth grade and McKenzie Junior High is sixth grade to eighth grade. The mascot of both schools is the bobcat. There is also a preschool run by the Community Action Commission of Santa Barbara County.

== Transportation ==
Guadalupe is at the intersection of California State Route 1 and 166, providing easy access to cities north, east, and south, the largest of which is nearby Santa Maria. Amtrak runs through town, and the Guadalupe station is on the Pacific Surfliner route. There is a large pedestrian bridge in the residential area, which gives an easy way for people to cross the tracks which split the town just east of Highway 1.

The Guadalupe Flyer bus runs routes to Santa Maria hourly.

== In popular culture ==
Filmmakers have used the Guadalupe-Nipomo Dunes as a setting for several films, including Cecil B. DeMille's 1923 Ten Commandments and in 1998 The Odd Couple II. Scenes from Pirates of the Caribbean: At World's End and Hidalgo have also been filmed here.

In 1993 the town was featured in California's Gold episode 401, "Buried Treasure". The episode centered around the set of The Ten Commandments buried underneath the Guadalupe Dunes.
