= Sonoma Mountain High School =

Alternative high school in California, USA

Coordinates: 38°14′32″N 122°35′53″W

Sonoma Mountain High School is one of three alternative schools in Petaluma, California. It is located on the Casa Grande High School campus. There are, on average, 32 pupils enrolled at Sonoma Mountain High School at any given time. About six pupils graduate every year.
