= Moraga School District =

School district in California

Address
- 1540 School Street Moraga, California, 94556; United States

District information
- Type: Public
- Grades: K–8
- NCES District ID: 0625740

Students and staff
- Students: 1,769
- Teachers: 81.67 (FTE)
- Staff: 94.69 (FTE)
- Student–teacher ratio: 21.66:1

Other information
- Website: www.moraga.k12.ca.us

The Moraga School District is an elementary school district in Moraga, California.

The majority of Moraga is within this district.

Schools in the district include Joaquin Moraga Intermediate School, Camino Pablo Elementary School, Donald Rheem Elementary School, and Los Perales Elementary School.

== Sex abuse cases ==
Four former students in the district have filed sex abuse charges against the district, for negligence, based on alleged incidents of abuse from the 1990s. The alleged abuser had since then committed suicide after being relieved of his position at the school.

== See also ==
- List of school districts in California
