= Petaluma Center, California =

- Unincorporated community Census designated place
- Location within California
- Coordinates: 38°15′2.35″N 122°47′19.83″W
- Country: United States
- State: California
- County: Sonoma

Area
  - Total: 1.173 sq mi (3.04 km^{2})
  - Land: 1.173 sq mi (3.04 km^{2})
  - Water: 0 sq mi (0 km^{2})
- Elevation: 92 ft (28 m)

Population (2020)
  - Total: 709
  - Density: 604/sq mi (233/km^{2})
- Time zone: UTC-8 (PST)
  - Summer (DST): UTC-7 (PDT)
- GNIS feature ID: 2813413

Petaluma Center is an unincorporated community and census designated place (CDP) in Sonoma County, California, United States. It covers the residential population of the Coast Guard facility Training Center Petaluma. Per the 2020 census, the population was 709.

== Demographics ==
Historical population
Census	Pop.	Note	%±
2020	709		—
U.S. Decennial Census; 2020

Petaluma Center first appeared as a census designated place in the 2020 U.S. census.

=== 2020 Census ===
Petaluma Center CDP, California – Racial and ethnic composition Note: the US Census treats Hispanic/Latino as an ethnic category. This table excludes Latinos from the racial categories and assigns them to a separate category. Hispanics/Latinos may be of any race.
Race / Ethnicity (NH = Non-Hispanic)	Pop 2020	% 2020
White alone (NH)	394	55.57%
Black or African American alone (NH)	41	5.78%
Native American or Alaska Native alone (NH)	9	1.27%
Asian alone (NH)	16	2.26%
Native Hawaiian or Pacific Islander alone (NH)	18	2.54%
Other race alone (NH)	3	0.42%
Mixed race or Multiracial (NH)	65	9.17%
Hispanic or Latino (any race)	163	22.99%
Total	709	100.00%

== Education ==
Petaluma Center is in the Two Rock Union Elementary School District and the Petaluma Joint Union High School District.
