= Ocean View Junior High =

Coordinates: 34°9′38″N 119°8′52″W

Ocean View Junior High School

Location
- 4300 Olds Road; Oxnard, California 93033; United States

Information
- Type: Public
- School district: Ocean View Elementary School District
- NCES School ID: 062817004354
- Principal: Denise Adams
- Teaching staff: 40.50 (FTE)
- Grades: 6—8
- Enrollment: 898 (2018–19)
- Student to teacher ratio: 22.17
- Campus: Urban
- Nickname: Seahawks
- Website: ovjh.oceanviewsd.org

Ocean View Junior High School (OVJH) is a public junior high school in Oxnard, California serving students in grades 6–8. The school is part of the Ocean View Elementary School District. As of the 2019–20 school year, OVJH has an enrollment of 898 students. The principal is Denise Adams.

OVJH feeds into the Oxnard Union High School District, with most students attending Channel Islands High School after graduating.

== History ==
Ocean View Junior High won a Title I academic award in 2005. It also won a Gold Ribbon Award in 2015; this designation was given to schools from 2015 to 2017 in place of the California Distinguished School award for which eligibility criteria were being updated during that time.

In 2018, OVJH librarian Maria Talia was one of five classified employees (i.e., non-teaching staff) nationwide to receive the Recognizing Inspiring School Employees Award from the National Coalition of Classified Education Support Employee Unions. Talia, an Ocean View School District employee for 19 years and a member of the California School Employees Association, was among those honored for "doing extraordinary and inspirational things in their schools and communities to promote quality education, foster positive learning environments and ensure student success".

The school was home to an "R&D" (Research and Development) class based around the sciences. It was the first of its kind in California. It also has a "21st Century Learning Academy" where sixth graders learn important skills for careers in the future.
