= McKinleyville Union School District =

School district in California, United States

Address
- 2275 Central Avenue McKinleyville, California, 95519; United States

District information
- Type: Public
- Grades: K–8
- NCES District ID: 0624300

Students and staff
- Students: 971
- Teachers: 44.47 (FTE)
- Staff: 78.32 (FTE)
- Student–teacher ratio: 21.83

Other information
- Website: mckusd.org

Mckinleyville Union Elementary School District is a public school district in Humboldt County, California, United States.There are three schools within the district: Dow's Prairie Elementary School, Morris Elementary School, and McKinleyville Middle School.
