= Hydesville Elementary School District =

School district in California, United States

Address
- 3050 Johnson Road Hydesville, California, 95547; United States

District information
- Type: Public
- Grades: K–8
- NCES District ID: 0618120

Students and staff
- Students: 175
- Teachers: 8.5 (FTE)
- Staff: 11.4 (FTE)
- Student–teacher ratio: 20.59

Other information
- Website: hydesvilleschool.org

Hydesville Elementary School District is a public school district based in Humboldt County, California, United States.
