= Arena Union Elementary School District =

School district in California, US

- Location of district office in Northern California

Address
- 45 Lake Street Point Arena, Mendocino County, California, 95468; United States
- Coordinates: 38.91306°N 123.69349°W

District information
- Type: Public elementary school district
- Grades: TK–12^{th}
- Established: 1885
- President: Cindy Cione
- Superintendent: Warren Galletti
- Business administrator: Catherine Chin
- School board: Seven trustees
- Governing agency: California Department of Education
- Schools: K–8: 1; Charter: 1
- NCES District ID: 0603090

Students and staff
- Enrollment: 313 (2017-18)
- Faculty: 21 (2017-18)
- Staff: 19 (2017-18)
- Student–teacher ratio: 14.9 (2017-18)

Other information
- State test: California Assessment of Student Performance and Progress (2018 Report)
- Service area: 250 sq mi (650 km^{2})
- Schedule: 180 days/year, M-F, August–June
- Website: pointarenaschools.org

The Arena Union Elementary School District is a public elementary school district based in Point Arena, California .It is part of one of only ten "Common Districts" in the state, following a model where two separate legal entities responsible for local public education (typically one for primary education and the other for secondary education) operate with a common board of trustees, superintendent, district office and budget. In this instance, the other entity in the Common District is Point Arena Joint Union High School District.Operating one public elementary school and overseeing a K-12 charter school, it serves over 300 students from Manchester to Gualala and the Point Arena/Manchester Rancherias.

== Schools ==
Arena Union Elementary School District Schools
School name	Address		School Type	Grades	Enrollment	Opened
Arena Union Elementary	20 School Street; Point Arena, CA 95468		Primary/ Secondary (Lower)	K–8^{th}	254	1941
Pacific Community Charter	K-8: 9-12:	10 Lake Street; Point Arena, CA 95468; 200 Lake Street; Point Arena, CA 95468	Charter	K–12^{th}	75	Aug 30, 1999
