= Esparto School District =

School district in California, United States

Esparto Unified School District

Address
- 26675 Plainfield Street Esparto, California, 95627; United States

District information
- Type: Public
- Grades: K–12
- NCES District ID: 0612930

Students and staff
- Students: 934
- Teachers: 43.39
- Staff: 51.46
- Student–teacher ratio: 21.53

Other information
- Website: www.eusdk12.org

Esparto Unified School District is a school district in Esparto, California. The district comprises Madison High School, Esparto High School, Esparto Middle School and Esparto Elementary School.
