= Shaffer Union Elementary School District =

School district in California, United States

Address
- 722-055 Highway 395 North Litchfield, California, 96117; United States

District information
- Type: Public
- Grades: K–8
- Schools: 1 elementary
- NCES District ID: 0636420

Students and staff
- Students: 187 (2020–2021)
- Teachers: 9.0 (FTE)
- Staff: 8.5 (FTE)
- Student–teacher ratio: 20.78:1

Other information
- Website: www.shafferschool.com

Shaffer Union Elementary School District is a public school district in Lassen County, California, United States.
