= Plainsburg Union Elementary School District =

School district in California, United States

Address
- 3708 South Plainsburg Road Merced, California, 95341; United States

District information
- Type: Public
- Grades: K–8
- NCES District ID: 0630810

Students and staff
- Students: 104 (2020–2021)
- Teachers: 6.0 (FTE)
- Staff: 5.95 (FTE)
- Student–teacher ratio: 17.33:1

Other information
- Website: www.plainsburg.k12.ca.us

Plainsburg Union Elementary School District is a public school district based in Merced County, California, United States.
