= Hope Elementary School District =

Elementary school district in Santa Barbara, California

Address
- 3970 La Colina Road Santa Barbara, California, 93110; United States

District information
- Type: Public
- Grades: K–6
- NCES District ID: 0617490

Students and staff
- Students: 775
- Teachers: 40.0
- Staff: 80.08
- Student–teacher ratio: 19.38

Other information
- Website: www.hopesdk6.org

Hope Elementary School District is an elementary school district in Santa Barbara, California. The district headquarters is adjacent to the Hope School.

Schools:

- Hope Elementary School
  - First opened prior to 1888; it closed in 1977 due to a lack of students but reopened in September 1997.
- Monte Vista School
  - Opened in 1966
- Vieja Valley School
  - Opened in 1961

Closed:

- Pedregosa School - Established 1870
