= Raymond-Knowles Union Elementary School District =

School district in California, United States

Address
- 31828 Road 600 Raymond, California, 93653; United States

District information
- Type: Public
- Grades: K–8
- NCES District ID: 0631920

Students and staff
- Students: 71 (2020–2021)
- Teachers: 4.0 (FTE)
- Staff: 6.0 (FTE)
- Student–teacher ratio: 17.75:1

Other information
- Website: www.rkusd.k12.ca.us

Raymond-Knowles Union Elementary School District is a public school district in Madera County, California, United States.
