= Marcum-Illinois Union Elementary School District =

School district in California, United States

Address
- 2452 El Centro Boulevard East Nicolaus, California, 95659; United States

District information
- Type: Public
- Grades: K–8
- NCES District ID: 0623800

Students and staff
- Students: 181 (2020–2021)
- Teachers: 10.0 (FTE)
- Staff: 15.62 (FTE)
- Student–teacher ratio: 18.1:1

Other information
- Website: www.marcum-illinois.org

Marcum-Illinois Union Elementary School District is a public school district in Sutter County, California, United States.
