= Curtis Creek School District =

School district in California, United States

Address
- 18755 Standard Road Sonora, California, 95370; United States

District information
- Type: Public
- Grades: K–8
- NCES District ID: 0610320

Students and staff
- Students: 431 (2020–2021)
- Teachers: 21.64 (FTE)
- Staff: 19.82 (FTE)
- Student–teacher ratio: 19.92:1

Other information
- Website: www.curtiscreekschool.com

Curtis Creek El School District is a public school district based in Tuolumne County, California.
