= Redding School District =

School district in California, United States

Address
- 5885 East Bonnyview Road Redding, California, 96001; United States

District information
- Type: Public
- Grades: K–12
- NCES District ID: 0632040

Students and staff
- Students: 2,950
- Teachers: 141.7
- Staff: 223.89
- Student–teacher ratio: 20.82

Other information
- Website: www.reddingschools.net

Redding School District is one of the many school districts in Redding, California. It includes a total of ten school sites: four TK-5th grade, three TK-8th grade, one 6-8th grade, and two K-8th homeschools. Redding School District covers a large portion of Redding's westside. Cindy Bishop is currently the superintendent.

The Redding School District includes the following schools:

- Bonnyview Elementary School
- Cypress Elementary School
- Manzanita Elementary School
- Sycamore Elementary School

TK-8th Grade:

- Juniper Elementary School
- Redding Achieve
- Turtle Bay School

6th-8th Grade:

- Sequoia Middle School

K-8th Homeschool:

- College Prep Academy
- Stellar Charter School
