= Chatom Union School District =

School district in California, United States

Address
- 7201 Clayton Road Turlock, California, 95380; United States

District information
- Type: Public
- Grades: K–8
- NCES District ID: 0608250

Students and staff
- Students: 573 (2020–2021)
- Teachers: 26.0 (FTE)
- Staff: 37.06 (FTE)
- Student–teacher ratio: 22.04:1

Other information
- Website: www.chatom.k12.ca.us

Chatom Union School District is a school district based in Stanislaus County, California, United States. The district operates Chatom Pre-School, Chatom Elementary School (grades K–5), and Mountain View Middle School (grades 6–8).
