= Pope Valley Union Elementary School District =

School district in California, United States

Address
- 6200 Pope Valley Road Pope Valley, California, 94567; United States

District information
- Grades: K–8
- Superintendent: Kenneth J. Burkhart
- Schools: 1 elementary
- NCES District ID: 0631380

Students and staff
- Students: 50 (2020–2021)
- Teachers: 4.0 (FTE)
- Staff: 4.5 (FTE)
- Student–teacher ratio: 12.5:1
- District mascot: Pope Valley Pioneers

Other information
- Website: www.pvk8.org

Pope Valley Union School District is a small public school district based in Pope Valley, a rural part of northeastern Napa County, California, United States near Lake Berryessa. It operates a single elementary school, Pope Valley Union Elementary School, located at 6200 Pope Valley Road, Pope Valley, California 94567. The school has four classes, each consisting of two or three grades. The district has 5 teachers and 53 students, and has been described as "a throwback to simpler times".
