= Camptonville Union Elementary School District =

School district in California, United States

Address
- 16585 School Street Camptonville, California, 95922; United States

District information
- Type: Public
- Grades: K–12
- NCES District ID: 0607260

Students and staff
- Students: 50 (2020–2021)
- Teachers: 4.0 {FTE}
- Staff: 7.98 {FTE}
- Student–teacher ratio: 12.5:1

Other information
- Website: www.cville.k12.ca.us

Camptonville Union Elementary School District is a public school district based in Yuba County, CA, United States
