= Winters Joint Unified School District (California) =

School district in California, United States

Address
- 909 West Grant Avenue Winters, California, 95694; United States

District information
- Type: Public
- Motto: Rooted In Excellence
- Grades: K–12
- Established: 1891; 135 years ago
- Superintendent: Rody Boonchouy
- NCES District ID: 0642930

Students and staff
- Students: 1,528 (2020–2021)
- Teachers: 74.88 {FTE}
- Staff: 83.99 {FTE}
- Student–teacher ratio: 20.41:1

Other information
- Teachers' unions: Winters Area Education Association, California Teachers Association
- Website: www.wintersjusd.org

Winters Joint Unified School District is a school district in Winters, California, United States. It served just over 1,800 students in 2008.
