= Enterprise Elementary School District =

School district in California

Address
- 1155 Mistletoe Lane Redding, California, 96002; United States

District information
- Type: Public
- Grades: K–12
- NCES District ID: 0612810

Students and staff
- Students: 3,680 (2020–2021)
- Teachers: 161.66 (FTE)
- Staff: 198.32 (FTE)
- Student–teacher ratio: 22.76:1

Other information
- Website: www.eesd.net

Enterprise Elementary School District is an elementary school district in Redding, California, United States. It covers a large portion of Redding's east side. The school district has eight elementary schools and one junior high school. Heather Armelino is the current superintendent.

== History ==
Enterprise Elementary School District participated in a statewide California school strike against COLA (Cost of Living Adjustments) in 2006.

== Schools ==
The schools in this district:

- Parsons Junior High School
- Alta Mesa Elementary School
- Boulder Creek Elementary School
- Even Start Elementary School
- June Street Elementary School
- Lassen View Elementary School
- Mistletoe Elementary School
- Rother Elementary School
- Shasta Meadows Elementary School
