= Farmersville Unified School District =

School district in California, United States

Address
- 571 East Citrus Drive Farmersville, California, 93223; United States

District information
- Type: Public
- Grades: K–12
- NCES District ID: 0600035

Students and staff
- Students: 2,484 (2020–2021)
- Teachers: 110.63 (FTE)
- Staff: 138.45 (FTE)
- Student–teacher ratio: 22.45:1

Other information
- Website: www.farmersville.k12.ca.us

Farmersville Unified School District is a public school district in Tulare County, California, United States.
