= Meridian Elementary School District =

School district in California, United States

Address
- 15898 Central Street Meridian, California, 95957; United States

District information
- Type: Public
- Grades: K–12
- NCES District ID: 0624690

Students and staff
- Students: 63 (2020–2021)
- Teachers: 3.0 (FTE)
- Staff: 3.76 (FTE)
- Student–teacher ratio: 21.0:1

Other information
- Website: meridiantigers.com

Meridian Elementary School District is a public school district based in Sutter County, California, United States.
