= Pacheco Union School District =

School district in California, United States

Address
- 7424 Pacheco School Road Redding, California, 96002; United States

District information
- Type: Public
- Grades: K–8
- NCES District ID: 0629280

Students and staff
- Students: 634
- Teachers: 35.0 (FTE)
- Staff: 39.24
- Student–teacher ratio: 18.11

Other information
- Website: www.pacheco.k12.ca.us

Pacheco Union School District is a public primary school district in Redding, California in the south side of the city. The district consists of two schools, Pacheco Elementary School, and Prairie Elementary School, serving about 615 pupils in Grades K to 8. The grades at Prairie are K-3, while Pacheco has grades 4–8. Both have a special needs classes.

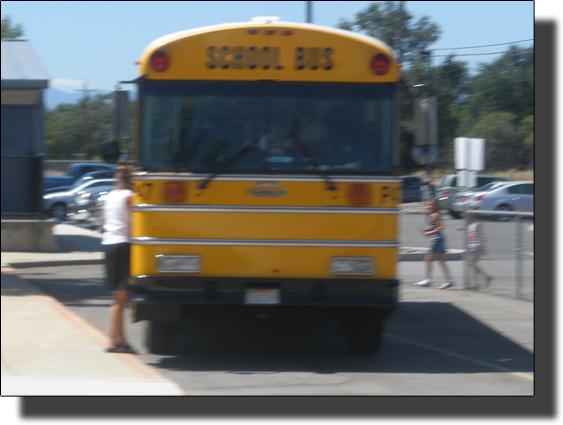
Prairie School
