= Arcata School District =

School district in California, United States

Arcata Elementary School District

Address
- 1435 Buttermilk Lane Arcata, California, 95521; United States

District information
- Type: Public
- Grades: K–8
- NCES District ID: 0603000

Students and staff
- Students: 484
- Teachers: 27.5 (FTE)
- Staff: 45.47 (FTE)
- Student–teacher ratio: 17.6

Other information
- Website: www.arcataschooldistrict.org

Arcata Elementary School District is a public school district based in Humboldt County, California.
