= Oak Grove Union School District =

School district in Sonoma County, California

Address
- 5299 Hall Road Santa Rosa, California, 95401; United States

District information
- Type: Public
- Grades: K–12
- NCES District ID: 0627840

Students and staff
- Students: 840
- Teachers: 36.74
- Staff: 38.32
- Student–teacher ratio: 22.86

Other information
- Website: www.ogusd.org

Oak Grove Union School District is a school district in Sonoma County, California. It has around 800 students and serves Graton and parts of western Santa Rosa. The district has one elementary school and one middle school. Oak Grove School, a TK-5 grade school, is nestled in the hills above the little town of Graton. Willowside Middle School, a 6-8 grade middle school, is located just west of Santa Rosa, among vineyards and rural environments. Both schools boast small populations with a private school-like atmosphere. The superintendent of the district is Amber Stringfellow.

Oak Grove school was founded in 1854 making Oak Grove Union School District the second-oldest school district in California.

== Elementary school ==
- Oak Grove Elementary

== Middle school ==
- Willowside Middle School

== See also ==
- List of school districts in Sonoma County, California
