= Piner-Olivet Union School District =

Public school district in Santa Rosa, California

Address
- 3450 Coffey Lane Santa Rosa, California, 95403; United States

District information
- Type: Public
- Grades: K–12
- NCES District ID: 0630450

Students and staff
- Students: 267 (2020–2021)
- Teachers: 11.0 (FTE)
- Staff: 25.26 (FTE)
- Student–teacher ratio: 24.27:1

Other information
- Website: www.pousd.org

Piner-Olivet Union School District has around 1,500 students and serves western Santa Rosa, California. The district has three elementary schools, one middle school, and one middle/high school.

== Elementary schools ==
- Olivet Elementary
- Jack London Elementary
- Schaefer Elementary

== Middle schools ==
- Piner Olivet Charter School Also known as POCS
- Northwest Prep, formerly known as The Career Academy at Piner

== High school ==
- Northwest Prep, formerly known as The Career Academy at Piner

== See also ==
- List of school districts in Sonoma County, California
