= Liberty School District =

School district in California, United States

Address
- 1771 E. Pacific Ave. Tulare, California, 93274; United States

District information
- Type: Public
- Grades: K–8
- NCES District ID: 0621570

Students and staff
- Students: 677 (2020–2021)
- Teachers: 29.0 (FTE)
- Staff: 18.0 (FTE)
- Student–teacher ratio: 23.34:1

Other information
- Website: www.libertyelementary.org

Liberty Elementary School District is a public school district based in Tulare County, California, United States. It consists of one school, Liberty Elementary, which is a Kindergarten through 8th grade school. The school's population has seen a recent boom due to a new campus and rapid expansion of the city around the new campus. The district surrounds the other districts of Visalia Unified, Sundale, Tulare City, and Oak Valley.
