= Plumas Lake Elementary School District =

School district in California, United States

Address
- 2743 Plumas School Road Plumas Lake, California, 95961; United States

District information
- Type: Public
- Grades: K–8
- Schools: 2 elementary (TK–5); 1 intermediate (6–8)
- NCES District ID: 0631180

Students and staff
- Students: 1,348 (2020–2021)
- Teachers: 69.0 {FTE}
- Staff: 65.89 {FTE}
- Student–teacher ratio: 19.54:1

Other information
- Website: www.plusd.org

Plumas Lake Elementary School District is a public school district in Yuba County, California, United States.

In 2003 Marysville Joint Unified School District gave territory to Plumas Lake Elementary School District and Wheatland Union High School District.
