= Grant Elementary School District =

School district in California, United States

Address
- 8835 Swasey Drive Redding, California, 96001; United States

District information
- Type: Public
- Grades: K–8
- NCES District ID: 0615690

Students and staff
- Students: 633 (2020–2021)
- Teachers: 31.17 (FTE)
- Staff: 24.94 (FTE)
- Student–teacher ratio: 20.31:1

Other information
- Website: www.grantschoolcougars.com

Grant Elementary School District (also known as Grant Elementary School) is its own independent public school district combined as a school, in Redding, California. It is the smallest school district in Redding, located in the far westside.

The district serves about 600 pupils in grades K to 8.
