= Knights Ferry Elementary School District =

School district in California

Address
- 12726 Dent Street Knights Ferry, California, 95361; United States

District information
- Type: Public
- Grades: K–8
- NCES District ID: 0620010

Students and staff
- Students: 144 (2020–2021)
- Teachers: 8.0 (FTE)
- Staff: 6.0 (FTE)
- Student–teacher ratio: 18.0:1

Other information
- Website: www.knightsferryesd.org

Knights Ferry Elementary School District is a school district based in Stanislaus County, California, United States.
