= Shandon Joint Unified School District =

School district in California, United States

Address
- 101 South First Street Shandon, California, 93461; United States

District information
- Type: Public
- Grades: K–12
- NCES District ID: 0636450

Students and staff
- Students: 282 (2020–2021)
- Teachers: 17.0 (FTE)
- Staff: 26.79 (FTE)
- Student–teacher ratio: 16.59:1

Other information
- Website: www.shandonschools.org

Shandon Joint Unified School District is a school district in San Luis Obispo County, California. It operates schools in Shandon and Parkfield
