= Alta Dutch Flat Elementary School District =

School district in California, United States

Address
- 34050 Alta-Bonny Nook Road Alta, California, 95701; United States
- Coordinates: 39.2082°N 120.8063°W

District information
- Type: Public
- Grades: K–8
- NCES District ID: 0602250

Students and staff
- Students: 82 (2020–2021)
- Teachers: 4.5 (FTE)
- Staff: 6.35 (FTE)
- Student–teacher ratio: 18.22:1

Other information
- Website: www.alta.k12.ca.us

The Alta-Dutch Flat School District is a school district in Placer County, California.

It currently maintains two schools, one in Alta, California and one in Emigrant Gap, California. Emigrant Gap Elementary School District was consolidated with Alta-Dutch Flat Elementary School District in 2001. Alta-Dutch Flat School was recognized as a California Distinguished School in 2004. Alta-Dutch Flat School had 8 teachers in 2005, a decrease from 11 in 2003. Currently, Emigrant Gap School has one teacher and six students. The district currently has 123 students. The current interim superintendent is Jim Roberts. Pete Keesler, a former superintendent-principal in the district, is the part-time principal. The current school board for the district is Lindsay Ostrom, David Rosenquist, Joel Baiocchi, Lynette Vrooman and Kathy Mutto. The 2008 Academic Performance Index (API) was 812. As in over 60% of school districts in California, due to declining enrollment and reduction in state funding, the district has made difficult, but significant reductions in staff, but not in programs. Alta-Dutch Flat teachers and staff are among the best in Placer County, and the success of their students, and the support of the community, reflects their training and dedication.
