= Harmony Union School District =

School district in California, United States

Address
- 1935 Bohemian Highway Occidental, California, 95465; United States
- Coordinates: 38°23′21″N 122°55′50″W

District information
- Type: Public
- Grades: K–12
- NCES District ID: 0616620

Students and staff
- Students: 200 (2020–2021)
- Teachers: 13.0 (FTE)
- Staff: 19.12 (FTE)
- Student–teacher ratio: 15.38:1

Other information
- Website: www.harmonyusd.org

Harmony Union School District is a public school district based in Occidental, California which feeds into the West Sonoma County Union High School District. Its offices are located at 1935 Bohemian Highway, Occidental, CA 95465. As of October 2009, it had an enrollment of 790 students (including charter school students).

== Schools ==
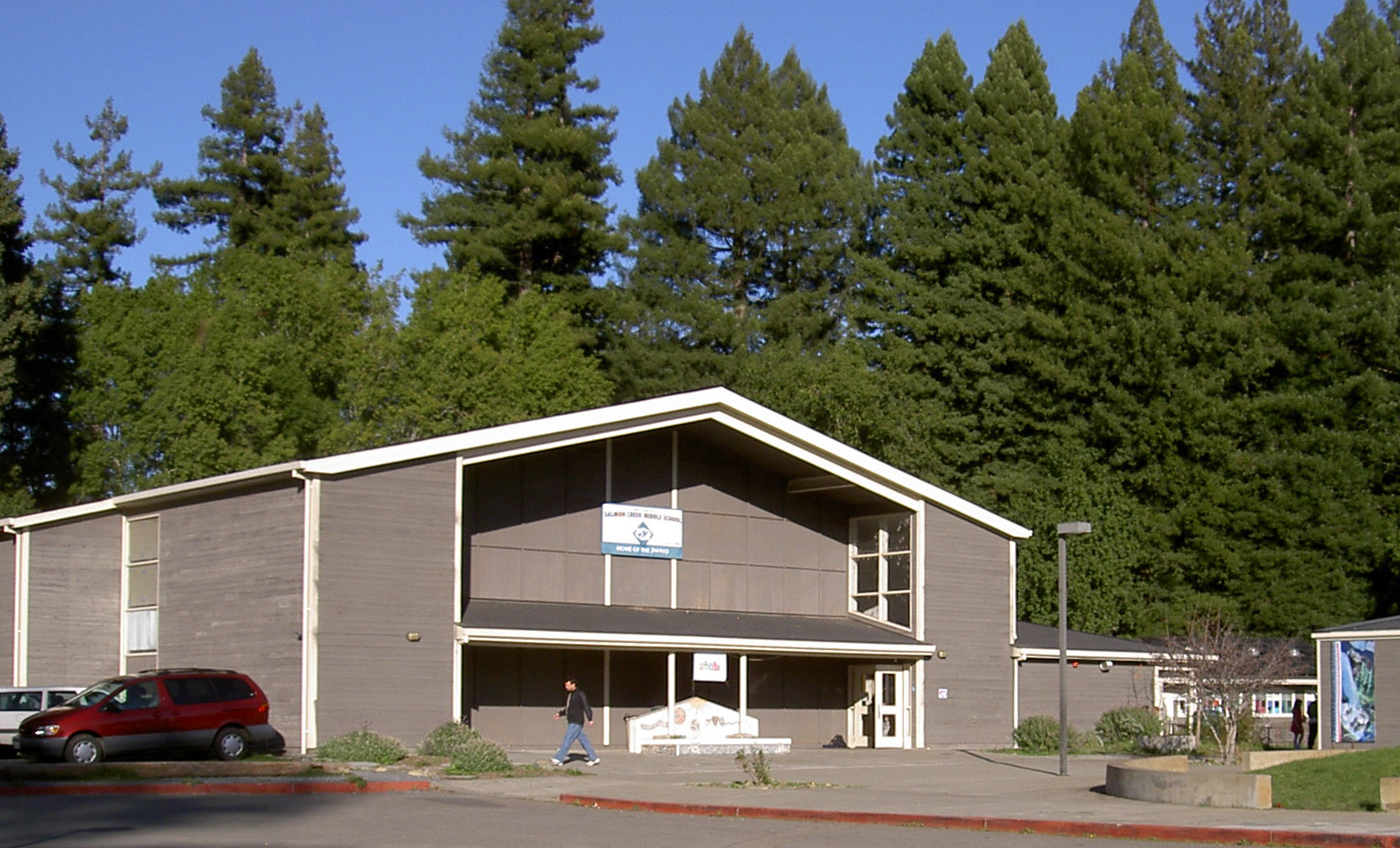
Salmon Creek Middle School Gym, 2007

- Harmony Elementary School (kindergarten to grade 2)
- Pathways Charter School (charter school, kindergarten to grade 12)
- Salmon Creek Middle School (charter school, grades Preschool-8)

== Board of trustees ==
The school board consists of:

- Henry Goff, President
- Fawn Nekton, Clerk
- Steven Bair
- Janet Foley
- Charlie Laird

== See also ==
- List of school districts in Sonoma County, California
