= Brittan Elementary School District =

School district in California, United States

Address
- 2340 Pepper Street Sutter, California, 95982; United States

District information
- Type: Public
- Grades: K–8
- NCES District ID: 0606090

Students and staff
- Students: 427
- Teachers: 20.0
- Staff: 13.25
- Student–teacher ratio: 21.35

Other information
- Website: www.brittan.k12.ca.us

Brittan Elementary School District is a school district in Sutter County, California, United States. It operates a single elementary school, Brittan Elementary School.
