= Le Grand Union Elementary School District =

School district in California, United States

Address
- 13071 East Le Grand Road Le Grand, California, 95333; United States

District information
- Type: Public
- Grades: K–8
- NCES District ID: 0621240

Students and staff
- Students: 361 (2020–2021)
- Teachers: 17.0 (FTE)
- Staff: 30.62 (FTE)
- Student–teacher ratio: 21.24:1

Other information
- Website: www.legrand.k12.ca.us

Le Grand Union Elementary School District is a public school district in Merced County, California, United States.
