= Livingston Union School District =

School district in California, United States

Address
- 922 B Street Livingston, California, 95334; United States

District information
- Type: Public
- Grades: K–8
- NCES District ID: 0622170

Students and staff
- Students: 2,474 (2020–2021)
- Teachers: 108.51 (FTE)
- Staff: 130.61 (FTE)
- Student–teacher ratio: 22.8:1

Other information
- Website: www.livingstonusd.org

Livingston Union School District is a public school district based in Merced County, California, United States.
