= Leggett Valley Unified School District =

School district in California, United States

Address
- 1 School Way Leggett, Mendocino County, California, 95585; United States
- Coordinates: 39.8651°N 123.7167°W

District information
- Type: Unified
- Grades: K – 12^{th}
- Superintendent/Principal: Sierra Lahera
- School board: Jessica Roemer, president
- Accreditation: WASC
- Schools: Leggett Valley Schools & Whale Gulch Schools
- NCES District ID: 0609665
- District ID: CA-23-75218

Other information
- Website: www.leggett.k12.ca.us
- Location of district office (red map pin) within Mendocino County (shown in green)

Leggett Valley Unified School District is a public school district based in Mendocino County, California, United States.
