= Shasta Union Elementary School District =

School district in California, United States

Address
- 10446 Red Bluff Road Shasta, California, 96087; United States
- Coordinates: 40.5915°N 122.4876°W

District information
- Type: Public
- Grades: K–8
- NCES District ID: 0636570

Students and staff
- Students: 114
- Teachers: 6.4
- Staff: 5.76
- Student–teacher ratio: 17.81

Other information
- Website: shasta.reddingschools.net

The Shasta Union Elementary School District is a school district that operates one elementary school, the Shasta Montessori Elementary School, located in the town of Shasta, California. It is a K-8 school, with 114 students in the 2020–21 school year. It has a public Montessori program for grades 1–6.

The President of the School Board in September 2010, is Roger Longnecker.
