= Klamath-Trinity Joint Unified School District =

School district in California, United States

Klamath Trinity Joint Unified Joint School District

Address
- 11800 Highway 96 Hoopa, California, 95546; United States

District information
- Type: Public
- Grades: K–12
- NCES District ID: 0619950

Students and staff
- Students: 990
- Teachers: 62.0 (FTE)
- Staff: 108.29 (FTE)
- Student–teacher ratio: 15.97

Other information
- Website: www.ktjusd.k12.ca.us

Klamath Trinity Joint Unified Joint School District is a public school district based in Humboldt County, California, United States.
