= Junction Elementary School District =

School district in California, United States

Address
- 9087 Deschutes Road Palo Cedro, California, 96073; United States

District information
- Type: Public
- Grades: K–8
- NCES District ID: 0619200

Students and staff
- Students: 336 (2020–2021)
- Teachers: 19.0 (FTE)
- Staff: 21.23 (FTE)
- Student–teacher ratio: 17.68:1

Other information
- Website: www.junctionesd.net

Junction Elementary School District is a public school district based in Shasta County, California, United States.
