= Golden Valley Unified School District =

School district in California, United States

Address
- 37479 Avenue 12 Madera, California, 93636; United States

District information
- Type: Public
- Grades: K–12
- Schools: 4
- NCES District ID: 0600068

Students and staff
- Students: 2,089 (2020–2021)
- Teachers: 96.14 (FTE)
- Staff: 111.14 (FTE)
- Student–teacher ratio: 21.73:1

Other information
- Website: www.gvusd.org

Golden Valley Unified School District is a public school district in Madera County, California, United States.
