= Casa Grande High School =

Coordinates: 38°14′34″N 122°35′56″W

Location
- 333 Casa Grande Road; Petaluma, California; United States

Information
- Type: Public
- Motto: Everyone Has A Place At The Big House
- School district: Petaluma City Schools
- Principal: Erika Noone
- Teaching staff: 75.10 (on FTE basis)
- Grades: 9th-12th
- Enrollment: 1,631 (2023-2024)
- Student to teacher ratio: 21.72
- Campus: Suburban
- Colors: Green and gold
- Mascot: Gaucho
- Newspaper: The Casa Revista (formerly The Gaucho Gazette)
- Website: Casa Grande High School

Casa Grande High School is a public high school in Petaluma, California. Casa Grande is one of two high schools in the Petaluma City Schools District.

== History ==
At the end of the 1960s, prior to the construction of Casa Grande High, the Petaluma City Schools District suffered from an exploding student population without the resources to keep up. Superintendent Lesly H. Meyer noted that "...in 1959, [the school district] had 950 senior high school students. On September 22 [1969], there will be 2,206 enrolled." At the time, the district was already short 3,147 square feet of state mandated building space for students. The district's immediate solution was the use of portable classrooms.

The school district couldn't begin planning for the construction of a new high school until October 14, 1969, when Petaluma voters would vote on a $12.7 million bond and school aid authorization package. County Supervisor George DeLong believed that the vote would fail without a record voter turnout, and he noted that if the vote failed and, "we have to cram our children into double and triple sessions, we must be prepared to pay a much heavier bill than that for schools." Nevertheless, on October 15, the $3.6 million high school bonds passed with 79 per cent of the vote and the $9.1 million for school construction passed with 77 per cent. Superintendent Meyer attributed the success to strong support from the local community, including newspapers and radio stations.

In 1970, the school district would spend $434,000 in total to purchase the land for the new high school from three land owners: $221,762 to the Founders Title Company; $165,000 to Mr. and Mrs. Henry J. Soldati; $48,237 to William R. Hartman. Construction for Casa Grande High School started in August, 1971.

Casa Grande High School opened on September 5, 1972 with 897 students.

== Extracurricular activities ==
=== Academic Decathlon ===
Casa Grande has raised an Academic Decathlon team. The team has represented Sonoma County for the last 30 years in the decathlon's state-level competition. They won California's Division II title seven times. The team has advanced to the final competition at the national level once, where it took sixth place overall. In 2017 Casa Grande's team had taken the title of 7th overall team in California Division I. The team has been revitalized as of the 2024-2025 school year, after several years without an advisor, and has competed at the regional competition twice, both times as an honorary team due to lack of team members.

=== United Anglers ===
The United Anglers was started in 1983 by Tom Furrer. He and his students started what is now an organization for monitoring the endangered steelhead trout, a native species found in Adobe Creek, the raising of rainbow trout and chinook salmon into the Russian River, and to educate the public. In 1993, students raised $510,000 to build a state of the art hatchery, opened in 1993. Most of the program's funding is raised by students in the program. In October, 1998, anthropologist Jane Goodall visited the program, noting that the Anglers stood out from other similar environmental programs.

=== Journalism ===
The Gaucho Gazette is Casa Grande High School newspaper. Established for more than a decade as of 2012, the Gaucho Gazette won the first place 63rd Redwood Empire Excellence in Journalism prize for high school journalism in 2009. The paper was named the 4th best student newspaper by the National Scholastic Press Association in 2012.

== Notable alumni ==
- Josh Akognon – professional basketball player
- Anthony Bender - Major League Baseball pitcher
- Justin Bruihl - Major League Baseball pitcher
- Jeff Gerstmann - video game journalist
- Jonny Gomes – professional baseball player, member of 2013 World Series champion Boston Red Sox
- Amy Gutierrez – sports journalist
- Elijah Qualls – NFL player, Philadelphia Eagles - Casa Grande Class of 2013, also played for the DC Defenders of the XFL
- Glenn Rubenstein – journalist, musician
- Spencer Torkelson - professional baseball player, first overall pick of 2020 Major League Baseball draft
