= Hollister Elementary School District =

School district in California, United States

Address
- 2690 Cienega Road Hollister, California, 95023; United States

District information
- Type: Public
- Grades: K–8
- NCES District ID: 0617340

Students and staff
- Students: 5,415 (2020–2021)
- Teachers: 224.19 (FTE)
- Staff: 283.42 (FTE)
- Student–teacher ratio: 24.15:1

Other information
- Website: www.hesd.org

Hollister Elementary School District is a public school district based in San Benito County, California, United States.
