= Empire Union School District =

School district in California, United States

Coordinates: 37.6392°N 120.9296°W

Address
- 116 North McClure Road Modesto, California, 95357; United States

District information
- Type: Public
- Grades: K–8
- Superintendent: C.W. Smith
- NCES District ID: 0612690

Students and staff
- Students: 2,866 (2020–2021)
- Teachers: 122.5 (FTE)
- Staff: 154.24 (FTE)
- Student–teacher ratio: 23.4:1

Other information
- Website: www.empire.k12.ca.us

Empire Union School District is a school district based in Modesto, California, United States.

Its schools are located in the California communities of Modesto and Empire in Stanislaus County and include:

Active

- Capistrano Elementary School
- Empire Elementary School
- Norman Glick Middle School
- Bernard Hughes Elementary School
- Christine Sipherd Elementary School
- Alice N. Stroud Elementary School

Former

- Teel Middle School (shut down)
