= Ocean View Elementary School District =

School district in Ventura County, California

Address
- 4200 Olds Road Oxnard, California, 93033; United States

District information
- Type: Public
- Grades: K–8
- NCES District ID: 0628170

Students and staff
- Students: 2,288 (2020–2021)
- Teachers: 103.0 (FTE)
- Staff: 142.4 (FTE)
- Student–teacher ratio: 22.21:1

Other information
- Website: www.oceanviewsd.org

Ocean View Elementary School District is a school district in Ventura County, California, U.S. It is located towards the south of Oxnard and encompasses 80 sq mi (210 km^{2}) of land on the coast west of Malibu. The District currently enrolls about 2,500 students in its schools and contains a diverse ethnic population.

The district contains one middle school, three elementary schools, and two pre-schools. The district feeds into the Oxnard Union High School District, usually Channel Islands High School.

== History ==
Ocean View Elementary School District was founded in 1872 at the completion of a one-room schoolhouse at the corner of what is now Olds and Hueneme Roads. In the 1950s, the District added elementary schools and a junior high to accommodate the post-World War II population growth from both Oxnard and nearby Point Mugu Naval Air Station.

== List of schools ==
Middle schools

- Ocean View Junior High

Elementary schools

- Mar Vista Elementary
- Laguna Vista Elementary
- Tierra Vista Elementary

Pre-schools

- Ocean View Early Education School
- Ocean Vista Early Education School
