= Clear Creek School District =

School district in California, United States

Address
- 17700 McCourtney Road Grass Valley, California, 95949; United States

District information
- Type: Public
- Grades: K–8
- NCES District ID: 0608880

Students and staff
- Students: 162 (2020–2021)
- Teachers: 8.86 (FTE)
- Staff: 7.63 (FTE)
- Student–teacher ratio: 18.28:1

Other information
- Website: clearcreekschool.com

Clear Creek Elementary School District is a public school district in Nevada County, California.
