= Peninsula Union School District =

School district in California, United States

Address
- 909 Vance Avenue Samoa, California, 95564; United States

District information
- Type: Public
- Grades: K–8
- NCES District ID: 0630090

Students and staff
- Students: 33
- Teachers: 3.0 (FTE)
- Staff: 7.35 (FTE)
- Student–teacher ratio: 11.0

Other information
- Website: www.peninsulaunion.org

Peninsula Union School District is a public school district based in Humboldt County, California, United States.
