= Burton School District =

School district in California, United States

Address
- 264 N. Westwood Street Porterville, California, 93257; United States

District information
- Type: Public
- Grades: K–12
- NCES District ID: 0606570

Students and staff
- Students: 4,840 (2020–2021)
- Teachers: 202.88 (FTE)
- Staff: 248.67 (FTE)
- Student–teacher ratio: 23.86:1

Other information
- Website: www.burtonschools.org

Burton Elementary School District is a public school district based in Tulare County, California.
