= Chicago Park School District =

School district in California, United States

Address
- 15725 Mt. Olive Road Grass Valley, California, 95945; United States

District information
- Type: Public
- Grades: K–8
- NCES District ID: 0608340

Students and staff
- Students: 153 (2020–2021)
- Teachers: 8.67 (FTE)
- Staff: 8.37 (FTE)
- Student–teacher ratio: 17.65:1

Other information
- Website: www.chicagoparkschool.org

Chicago Park School District is a school district in Nevada County, California, United States.

Some of in the schools in the district include: Chicago Park School

== Chicago Park School ==
This is a small school in the Chicago Park District, K-8, with the standard based academic curriculum of California. They have a before school GATE program and a state of the art science lab for the 4th through 8th grade.
