= King City Union School District =

School district in California, United States

Address
- 104 South Vanderhurst Avenue King City, California, 93930; United States

District information
- Type: Public
- Grades: K–8
- NCES District ID: 0619680

Students and staff
- Students: 2,555 (2020–2021)
- Teachers: 117.6 (FTE)
- Staff: 121.45 (FTE)
- Student–teacher ratio: 21.73:1

Other information
- Website: www.kcusd.org

King City Union Elementary School District is a public school district based in Monterey County, California, United States.
