= Panama–Buena Vista Union School District =

School district in California, United States

Address
- 4200 Ashe Road Bakersfield, California, 93313; United States

District information
- Type: Public school district
- Motto: Excellence in Education
- Grades: K–8
- Established: 1875
- Superintendent: Katie Russell
- NCES District ID: 0606390

Students and staff
- Students: 18,262 (2020–2021)
- Teachers: 761.91 (FTE)
- Staff: 1,214.41 (FTE)
- Student–teacher ratio: 23.97:1

Other information
- Schedule: Nine-month
- Website: www.pbvusd.k12.ca.us

Panama–Buena Vista Union School District is a K-8 public school district in Bakersfield, California. The district has 25 schools, and serves Southwest Bakersfield.

== Schools ==
=== K-8 ===
- Dolores S. Whitley TK-8 School
- Mountain View TK-8

=== Junior High ===
- Earl Warren Junior High
- Fred L. Thompson Junior High School
- O.J. Actis Junior High School
- Tevis Junior High School
- Stonecreek Junior High

=== Elementary ===
- Amy B. Seibert Elementary School
- Berkshire Elementary School
- Bill L. Williams Elementary School
- Buena Vista Elementary School
- Charles H. Castle Elementary School
- Christa McAuliffe Elementary School
- Douglas J. Miller Elementary School
- Highgate Elementary School
- Laurelglen Elementary School
- Leo B. Hart Elementary School
- Louise Sandrini Elementary School
- Old River Elementary School
- Panama Elementary School
- Ronald Reagan Elementary School
- Roy W. Loudon Elementary School
- Sing Lum Elementary School
- Stine Elementary School
- Stockdale Elementary School
- Wayne Van Horn Elementary School
