= Geyserville Unified School District =

School district in California, United States

Address
- 1300 Moody Lane Geyserville, California, 95441; United States

District information
- Type: Public
- Grades: K–12
- Schools: 3
- NCES District ID: 0615150

Students and staff
- Students: 203 (2023–2024)
- Teachers: 16.60 (on an FTE basis)
- Staff: 15.49 (on an FTE basis)
- Student–teacher ratio: 12.23:1

Other information
- Website: www.gusd.com

Geyserville Unified School District is a public school district based in Sonoma County, California, United States.
