= Pacific Union School District (Arcata, California) =

School district in California, United States

Coordinates: 40.894°N 124.092°W

Address
- 3001 Janes Road Arcata, California, 95521; United States

District information
- Type: Public
- Grades: K–8
- Schools: 1 elementary school
- NCES District ID: 0629430

Students and staff
- Students: 589
- Teachers: 26.5 (FTE)
- Staff: 23.25 (FTE)
- Student–teacher ratio: 22.23

Other information
- Website: www.pacificunionschool.org

Pacific Union Elementary School District is a public school district based in Arcata, Humboldt County, California, United States.
