= Weaver Union School District =

School district in California

Address
- 1240 D ST. Merced, California; United States

District information
- Grades: K–8
- Schools: 4
- NCES District ID: 0641880

Students and staff
- Students: 3,032
- Teachers: 148.89 FTE
- Student–teacher ratio: 20.36:1

Other information
- Website: www.weaverusd.org

Weaver Union School District is a school district located in Merced, California.

The district ranges from Kindergarten up to the Eighth grade.

It consists of one preschool (Weaver Preschool), two elementary schools (Farmdale Elementary and Pioneer Elementary), and one middle school (Weaver Middle School).

In August 2020, the district completed construction on a building expansion of the Middle School & Preschool.
