= Orcutt Union School District =

School district in Santa Barbara County California

Address
- 500 Dyer Street Orcutt, California, 93455; United States

District information
- Type: Public
- Grades: K–12
- NCES District ID: 0628710

Students and staff
- Students: 4,842 (2020–2021)
- Teachers: 194.65 (FTE)
- Staff: 210.78 (FTE)
- Student–teacher ratio: 24.88:1

Other information
- Website: www.orcuttschools.net

The Orcutt Union School District is located in Santa Barbara County on the central coast of California. There are six elementary schools, two middle schools, and one charter school, which first began on August 20, 2008. There are approximately 5,040 students and more than 500 staff members. http://www.orcuttschools.net/

== Junior high schools ==
- Orcutt Junior High School
- Lakeview Junior High School

== Elementary schools ==
- Olga Reed Elementary School
- Alice Shaw Elementary School
- Pine Grove Elementary School
- Patterson Road Elementary School
- Ralph Dunlap Elementary School
- Joe Nightingale Elementary School

== Charter school ==
- Orcutt Academy High School

== Former school ==
- May Grisham Elementary School
