= Bennett Valley Union School District =

School district in California, United States

Address
- 2250 Mesquite Drive Santa Rosa, California, 95405; United States

District information
- Type: Public
- Grades: TK–6
- NCES District ID: 0604650

Students and staff
- Students: 938 (2020–2021)
- Teachers: 40.0 (FTE)
- Staff: 87.68 (FTE)
- Student–teacher ratio: 23.45:1

Other information
- Website: www.bvusd.org

Bennett Valley Union School District is a public school district based in Santa Rosa, in Sonoma County, California, United States. It operates two elementary schools, Yulupa School and Strawberry School. The district served 938 students in the 2023–2024 school year.
