= Santa Rita Union Elementary School District =

School district in California, United States

Address
- 57 Russell Road Salinas, California, 93906; United States

District information
- Type: Public
- Grades: K–8
- NCES District ID: 0635790

Students and staff
- Students: 3,470 (2020–2021)
- Teachers: 151.41 (FTE)
- Staff: 154.6 (FTE)
- Student–teacher ratio: 22.92:1

Other information
- Website: www.santaritaschools.org

Santa Rita Union School District is located in Salinas, California, USA. The district consists of Gavilan View Middle School (grades 6–8), John Gutierrez Middle School (formerly Bolsa Knolls)(grades 6–8), La Joya Elementary School (K-5), Santa Rita Elementary School (K-5), McKinnon Elementary School (K-5), and New Republic Elementary School (K-5). The district office is currently located in front of Gavilan View Middle School on Russell Road. The district office used to be located about a half mile away in a smaller building. In the 90s, the building that houses the current district office was built and subsequently the district office moved.
