= Konocti Unified School District =

School district in California, United States

Address
- 9430B Lake Street Lower Lake, California, 95457; United States

District information
- Type: Public
- Grades: K–12
- NCES District ID: 0620070

Students and staff
- Students: 3,603 (2020–2021)
- Teachers: 166.39 (FTE)
- Staff: 243.98 (FTE)
- Student–teacher ratio: 21.65:1

Other information
- Website: www.konoctiusd.org

Konocti Unified School District is a public school district based in Lake County, California, United States.
