= Healdsburg Unified School District =

School district in Healdsburg, California, United States

Address
- 1028 Prince Street Healdsburg, California, 95448; United States

District information
- Type: Public
- Grades: K–12
- NCES District ID: 0600044

Students and staff
- Students: 1,317 (2020–2021)
- Teachers: 78.6 (FTE)
- Staff: 82.55 (FTE)
- Student–teacher ratio: 16.76:1

Other information
- Website: www.husd.com

Healdsburg Unified School District is a public school district based in Sonoma County, California, United States. The district operates two elementary schools, plus Healdsburg Junior High, and Healdsburg High School, where HUSD's main office is located.
