= Kenwood School District =

School district in California, United States

Address
- 230 Randolph Avenue Kenwood, California, 95452; United States

District information
- Type: Public
- Grades: K–6
- NCES District ID: 0619410

Students and staff
- Students: 111 (2020–2021)
- Teachers: 6.95 (FTE)
- Staff: 11.21 (FTE)
- Student–teacher ratio: 18.85:1

Other information
- Website: www.kenwoodschool.org

Kenwood Elementary School District is a public school district based in Sonoma County, California, United States. Kenwood Elementary School District is composed of one school called Kenwood Elementary. The district served 111 students in the 2023-2024 school year.
