= Cinnabar School District =

School district in California, United States

Address
- 286 Skillman Lane Petaluma, California, 94952; United States

District information
- Type: Public
- Grades: K–8
- NCES District ID: 0608700

Students and staff
- Students: 251 (2020–2021)
- Teachers: 12.0 (FTE)
- Staff: 13.16 (FTE)
- Student–teacher ratio: 20.92:1

Other information
- Website: www.cinnabar.org

Cinnabar Elementary School District is a public school district based in Petaluma, Sonoma County, California.
