= Old Adobe Union School District =

School district in California, United States

Address
- 845 Crinella Drive Petaluma, California, 94954; United States

District information
- Type: Public
- Grades: K–6
- NCES District ID: 0628320

Students and staff
- Students: 1,902 (2020–2021)
- Teachers: 80.0 (FTE)
- Staff: 113.8 (FTE)
- Student–teacher ratio: 23.77:1

Other information
- Website: www.oldadobe.org

Old Adobe Union School District is a public school district in Sonoma County, California, United States.
