= Liberty School District Petaluma =

School district in California, United States

Address
- 170 Liberty School Road Petaluma, California, 94952; United States

District information
- Type: Public
- Grades: K–12
- NCES District ID: 0621540

Students and staff
- Students: 209 (2020–2021)
- Teachers: 11.21 (FTE)
- Staff: 15.42 (FTE)
- Student–teacher ratio: 18.64:1

Other information
- Website: libertysd.org

Liberty School District is a public school district based in Sonoma County, California, United States.
