= Gravenstein Union School District =

School district in California, United States

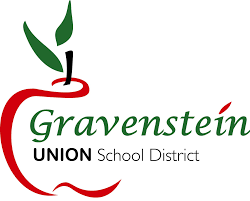

Address
- 3840 Twig Ave. Sebastopol, California, 95472; United States

District information
- Type: Public
- Grades: K–8
- NCES District ID: 0615840

Students and staff
- Students: 757
- Teachers: 42.57
- Staff: 35.18
- Student–teacher ratio: 17.78

Other information
- Website: www.gusdschools.org

Gravenstein Union School District (GUSD) or Gravenstein Schools is a school district headquartered in Sonoma County, California, headquartered in Sebastopol. As of 2024, Keri Pugno is the superintendent.

== Schools ==
There are two schools in the district: Gravenstein Elementary School and Hillcrest Middle School. The principal of Gravenstein Elementary School is Matthew McDowell and the principal of Hillcrest Middle School is William Deeths. GUSD schools have earned six California Distinguished Schools awards since 1990; Gravenstein Elementary School has earned two awards while Hillcrest Middle School has earned seven California Distinguished Schools awards since 2000.

In 2013, Hillcrest was the only Sonoma County school to earn a California Exemplary Arts Award. In addition, Hillcrest was nominated for a National Blue Ribbon School award.

Gravenstein Elementary School provides more than 500 children with a academic program along with music and performing arts; Science, Technology, Engineering, Math (STEM); sports and athletics, and the acclaimed "Artist in the Classroom" experience.

Hillcrest Middle School offers advanced mathematics courses, a two-year laboratory science program, regular Spanish instruction for all students, and a strong music and performing arts program. There is a new addition of STEAM model starting in 6th grade and a new STREAM lab with 3D printers, laser cutters and a green screen for "Hillcrest News". Hillcrest Middle School graduates typically advance to Analy High School, one of Sonoma County's highest ranked schools.

== Projects and programs ==
On January 27, 2020, GUSD celebrated the completion of the Hillcrest Middle School Solar Panel project. The array at Hillcrest and another array at Gravenstein Elementary, which came online during the week of January 27, 2020, was paid for by Prop. 39 funds, a clean energy modernization initiative for schools.

GUSD is also home to the ENRICH! Creative Arts Magnet Program since 2003. The ENRICH! program has emphasized art, music, drama, and STEM for students in grades K-8 while providing a strong academic education based on state standards. In the spring of 2010, GUSD changed the program name to ENRICH!. During the 2019–20 school year, the GUSD expanded the Enrich! Program to all students, grades TK-8.
