= KLOA-LP =

Television station in Inyokern, California

- Inyokern, California; United States
- Channels: Analog: 6 (VHF)

Ownership
- Owner: Adelman Broadcasting; (Robert D. Adelman)
- Sister stations: KGBB; KLOA; KEPD; KRAJ

History
- First air date: 1975
- Last air date: July 2021
- Former call signs: K61AJ (1975–2008); K06OL (2008–2012)
- Former channel numbers: Analog: 61 (UHF, 1975–2008)
- Former affiliations: Independent (via KTLA, 1975–1995); The WB (via KTLA, 1995–2006)
- Call sign meaning: named after sister station KLOA (AM)

Technical information
- Licensing authority: FCC
- Facility ID: 28583
- Class: TX
- ERP: 0.75 kW
- HAAT: 1,152 m (3,780 ft)
- Transmitter coordinates: 35°28′40.8″N 117°42′1.2″W

Links
- Public license information: LMS

Radio station information
- Frequency: 87.7 MHz
- Branding: 87.7 Country Gold

Programming
- Format: Classic country

KLOA-LP (channel 6) was a low-power television station in Inyokern, California, United States. Because the allocation of channel 6 in NTSC fell approximately within the lower fringes of the FM broadcast band, KLOA-LP took advantage of the station's audio carrier, broadcasting on 87.75 MHz, and marketed itself as a radio station. It aired a classic country format under the moniker "87.7 Country Gold". According to the Federal Communications Commission, television stations must operate both the audio and video carriers; however, the carriers are not required to "accompany" each other, meaning that the audio and video can operate independently. This meant that KLOA-LP did not have to broadcast any particular image, as long as they broadcast a video signal.

== History ==
KLOA-LP was originally K61AJ, a translator station on channel 61 owned by the Indian Wells Valley TV Booster, providing over-the-air reception of KTLA to Ridgecrest, California. The original construction permit for K61AJ, licensed to serve Inyokern and Armitage Field, was issued on February 26, 1975.

On January 17, 2005, the station was sold to Roy William Mayhugh, who applied to move the station to channel 6, under the call sign K06OL. On July 30, 2007, Roy William Mayhugh sold the station to Antelope Valley area broadcaster Robert D. Adelman. Soon after, K06OL converted operations to a radio station and flipped to a Spanish adult contemporary format. The call letters were changed to KLOA-LP on April 11, 2012. By then, the station was playing country music in English as "Kickin' Country 87.7".

After the Federal Communications Commission mandated the shutdown of all analog low-power television stations, which also included franken-FM stations, KLOA-LP signed off nearing the mandated deadline of July 13, 2021, with the website announcing its closure and inviting listeners to tune to sister station KGIL (98.5 FM) in Johannesburg, California.

== See also ==
- KNIK-LD (similar station in Anchorage, Alaska)
- KZNO-LD (similar station in Big Bear Lake, California)
- WNYZ-LP (similar station in New York City)
