= KZIQ-FM =

- Ridgecrest, California; United States
- Frequency: 92.7 MHz
- Branding: Qlite 92.7

Programming
- Format: Hot adult contemporary
- Affiliations: Jones Radio Network

Ownership
- Owner: Robert Adelman; (Adelman Broadcasting, Inc.)
- Sister stations: KGBB; KEPD; KWDJ; KWDJ-FM

History
- First air date: January 1, 1978

Technical information
- Licensing authority: FCC
- Facility ID: 30158
- Class: A
- ERP: 3,000 watts
- HAAT: −40 meters (−130 ft)
- Transmitter coordinates: 35°36′58″N 117°38′35″W

Links
- Public license information: Public file; LMS
- Webcast: Listen live
- Website: www.927qlite.com

KZIQ-FM (92.7 FM, "92.7 Qlite") is a commercial radio station that is licensed to Ridgecrest, California. Owned by Adelman Broadcasting, it broadcasts a hot adult contemporary format, providing music and local news and information to the Indian Wells Valley.

== History ==
KZIQ-FM first signed on January 1, 1978, with a beautiful music format. Originally owned by Space/Time Broadcasting Company, it was the sister station to country-formatted KZIQ. In June 1986, Space/Time sold KZIQ-AM-FM to Bel Air Broadcasting Corporation, owned by Robert M. Rosenthal, for $335,000.

Bel Air attempted to sell KZIQ-AM-FM in 1991, but the first two deals fell through. The first deal reached was in January with Michaels Media, headed by Pat Michaels, for $650,000. In March, a sale to Blessing Broadcasting valued at $682,500 also failed to close. By the end of the year, Bel Air successfully sold the combo to James Knudsen for $250,000 — less than half of either previous deal. At the time of the sale, KZIQ-FM aired a soft adult contemporary format.

On November 25, 2011, KZIQ-FM and its sister station, now called KWDJ, went silent due to a dispute over the stations' lease. Eric and Kim Kauffman operated the stations under a lease from owners Donna and James Knudsen in the hopes of eventually purchasing them. However, the Knudsens used a loophole in the agreement to retain ownership and offer terms that ultimately were unacceptable to the Kauffmans. Eric Kauffman purchased KWTY (94.5 FM, now defunct) and moved his programming there as well as online via TuneIn. KZIQ-FM returned to the air December 5, 2011, with a hot adult contemporary format.

On January 7, 2013, KZIQ-FM adjusted its format to conventional adult contemporary and rebranded as "Q-Lite 92.7". That same month, the Knudsens sold KZIQ-FM and KWDJ to Adelman Broadcasting, Inc. for $220,000. The deal included a time brokerage agreement allowing Adelman to begin programming the stations immediately; the sale closed in April.
