= KRAJ =

KRAJ may refer to:

- KRAJ (FM), a radio station (98.5 FM) licensed to serve Johannesburg, California, United States
- KWDJ-FM, a radio station (100.9 FM) licensed to serve Johannesburg, California, which held the call sign KRAJ from 1998 to 2026
- KGBB, a radio station (103.9 FM) licensed to serve Edwards, California, which held the call sign KRAJ from 1988 to 1998
