= KLOA =

KLOA may refer to:

- KLOA (AM), a radio station (1240 AM) licensed to Ridgecrest, California, United States
- KLOA-LP, a defunct television station (channel 6) formerly licensed to Inyokern, California, United States, which operated as a radio station (87.7 FM)
- KEPD, a radio station (104.9 FM) licensed to Ridgecrest, California, United States that held the call sign KLOA-FM from March 1989 to July 2009
