= KWDJ =

KWDJ may refer to:

- KWDJ (AM), a radio station (1360 AM) licensed to serve Ridgecrest, California, United States
- KWDJ-FM, a radio station (100.9 FM) licensed to serve Johannesburg, California
- KYZA, a radio station (92.7 FM) licensed to serve Adelanto, California, which held the call sign KWDJ from 1983 to 1990
