= Cuddeback =

Cuddeback is a surname. Notable people with the surname include:

- Leon D. Cuddeback (1898–1984), American aviator
- William H. Cuddeback (1852–1919), American lawyer and politician
- Zachary Cuddeback (died 2011), American shooting victim

== See also ==
- Cuddeback Lake
- Cuddeback Airfield
