= X-15 Flight 3-65-97 =

Failed 1967 American crewed sub-orbital spaceflight

Flight 191
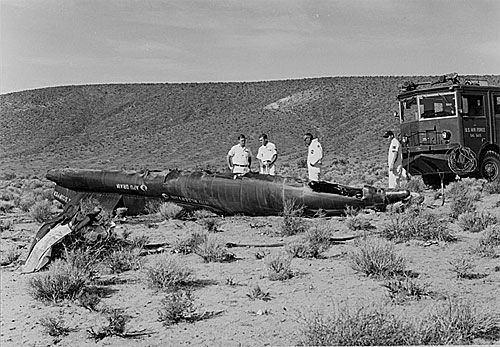
- Crash site
- Mission type: Test flight
- Mission duration: 10 minutes, 35 seconds
- Apogee: 81 kilometres (266,000 ft)

Spacecraft properties
- Spacecraft: X-15 56-6672

Crew
- Crew size: 1
- Members: Michael J. Adams

Start of mission
- Launch date: 15 November 1967, 18:30:07 UTC
- Launch site: Balls 8, Edwards; Dropped over Delamar Dry Lake

End of mission
- Destroyed: 15 November 1967, 18:40:42 UTC; Broke up over Randsburg, California; 35°25′10.68″N 117°36′2.00″W

X-15 Flight 3-65-97, also known as X-15 Flight 191 (being the 191st free flight of the X-15), was a sub-orbital spaceflight of the North American X-15 experimental spaceplane, carrying seven experiments to a peak altitude of 266,000 feet (50.4 mi; 81 km; 43.8 nmi), above NASA's definition of the start of space at 50 miles (80 km) but below the Kármán line definition at 100 kilometres (62 mi). The flight, on November 15, 1967, ended when the aircraft broke apart during its descent due to technical difficulties, killing the pilot Michael J. Adams and destroying the aircraft.

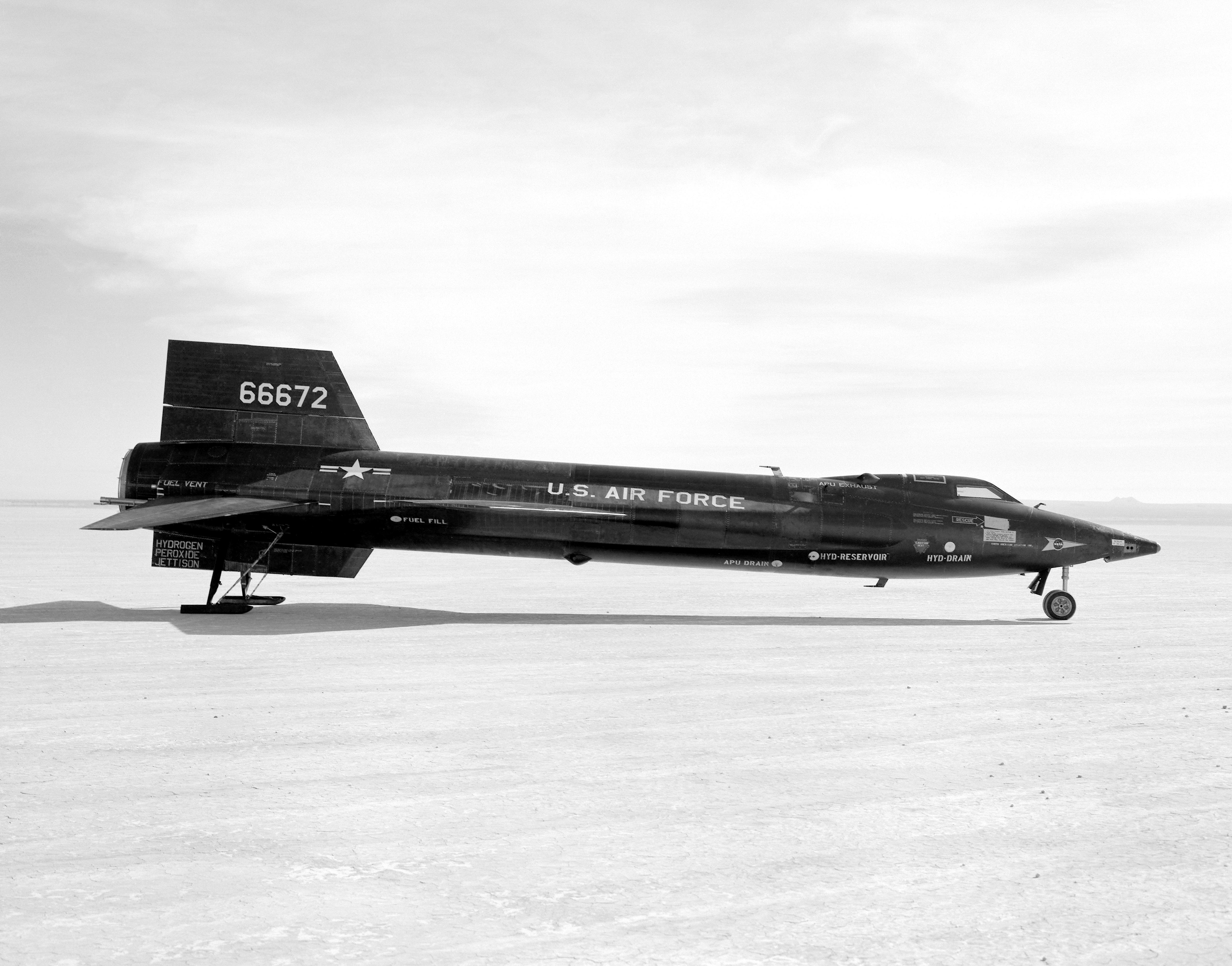
56-6672, the X-15 involved in the accident in 1962

== Mission overview ==
Adams's seventh X-15 flight took place on November 15, 1967, in the number three aircraft. At 10:30 in the morning on November 15, the X-15-3 was released from the wing of NB-52B mothership at 14,000 m (45,000 ft) over Delamar Dry Lake.

Experiments and tests on this flight to 266,000 feet were:

- Boost guidance experiment
- Solar spectrum measurement
- Ultraviolet plume detection
- Micrometeorites collection
- Wingtip pod deflection photography
- Test of Saturn V booster insulation on X-15 reentry
- Test of traversing probe in a wingtip experiment pod

While in powered flight, an electrical disturbance distracted Adams and slightly degraded the control of the aircraft; having adequate backup controls, Adams continued. At 10:33, he reached a peak altitude of 81,000 m (266,000 ft). In the NASA 1 control room, mission controller Pete Knight monitored the mission with a team of engineers.

As the X-15 climbed, Adams began a planned wing-rocking (rolling) maneuver so an on-board camera could scan the horizon. At the conclusion of the wing-rocking portion of the climb, the X-15 had begun a slow drift in heading; 40 seconds later, when the aircraft had reached its maximum altitude, it was off heading by 15 degrees to the left. As Adams came over the top, the drift briefly halted as the aircraft's nose yawed 15 degrees back to the correct attitude. Then the drift to the left began again; within 30 seconds, Adams's descending flight path was at a right angle to the attitude of the aircraft. At 70,000 m (230,000 ft), while descending into the rapidly increasing density of the atmosphere, the X-15 entered a Mach 5 (5,300 km/h) spin.

In the NASA 1 control room, there was no way to monitor the heading of the aircraft, so the situation was unknown to the engineers monitoring the flight. Normal conversation continued between Knight and Adams, with Knight advising Adams that he was "a little bit high", but in "real good shape". Adams radioed that the aircraft "[seemed] squirrelly", and moments later repeatedly told Knight that he had entered a spin. The ground controllers sought to get the X-15 straightened out, but there was no recommended spin recovery technique for the X-15, and engineers knew nothing about the aircraft's supersonic spin tendencies. The chase pilots, realizing that the X-15 would never make Rogers Dry Lake, headed for the emergency lakes, Ballarat and Cuddeback, in case Adams attempted an emergency landing.

Adams held the X-15's controls against the spin, using both the flight controls and the reaction control jets in the nose and wings. He managed to recover from the spin at 36,000 m (118,000 ft) and went into an inverted Mach 4.7 (5,200 km/h) dive at an angle between 40 and 45 degrees. In theory, Adams was in a good position to roll upright, pull out of the dive and set up a landing. However, due to high gain in the adaptive control system, the X-15 went into limit-cycle oscillations with rapid pitching motion of increasing severity, still in a dive at 49,000 m (160,000 ft) per minute. As the X-15 neared 20,000 m (65,000 ft), it was diving at Mach 3.93 (4,200 km/h; 2,600 mph) and experiencing more than 15 g_{0} (150 m/s^{2}) vertically, and 8 g_{0} (78 m/s^{2}) laterally.

The aircraft broke up northeast of the small Californian settlement of Johannesburg 10 minutes and 35 seconds after launch. An Air Force pilot, who was filling in for another chase pilot, spotted the main wreckage northwest of Cuddeback Lake. The aircraft was destroyed, and Adams killed.

After Adams's death, a number of pilots and engineers quit the program, including John A. Manke in 1967.

== Investigation ==
NASA and the Air Force convened an accident board. Chaired by NASA's Donald R. Bellman, the board took two months to prepare its report. Ground parties scoured the countryside looking for wreckage, specifically the film from the cockpit camera. The weekend after the accident, an unofficial NASA Flight Research Center (FRC) search party found the camera, but could not find the film cartridge. FRC engineer Victor W. Horton organized a search and on November 29, during the first pass over the area, Willard E. Dives found the cassette.

The accident board found that the cockpit instrumentation had been functioning properly, and concluded that Adams had lost control of the X-15 as a result of a combination of distraction, misinterpretation of his instrumentation display, and possible vertigo. The electrical disturbance early in the flight degraded the overall effectiveness of the aircraft's control system and further added to pilot workload.

The board made two major recommendations: install a telemetered heading indicator in the control room, visible to the flight controller; and medically screen X-15 pilot candidates for labyrinth (vertigo) sensitivity. As a result of the X-15's crash, the FRC added a ground-based "8 ball" attitude indicator in the control room to furnish mission controllers with real time pitch, roll, yaw, heading, angle of attack, and side-slip information.

== Memorials ==
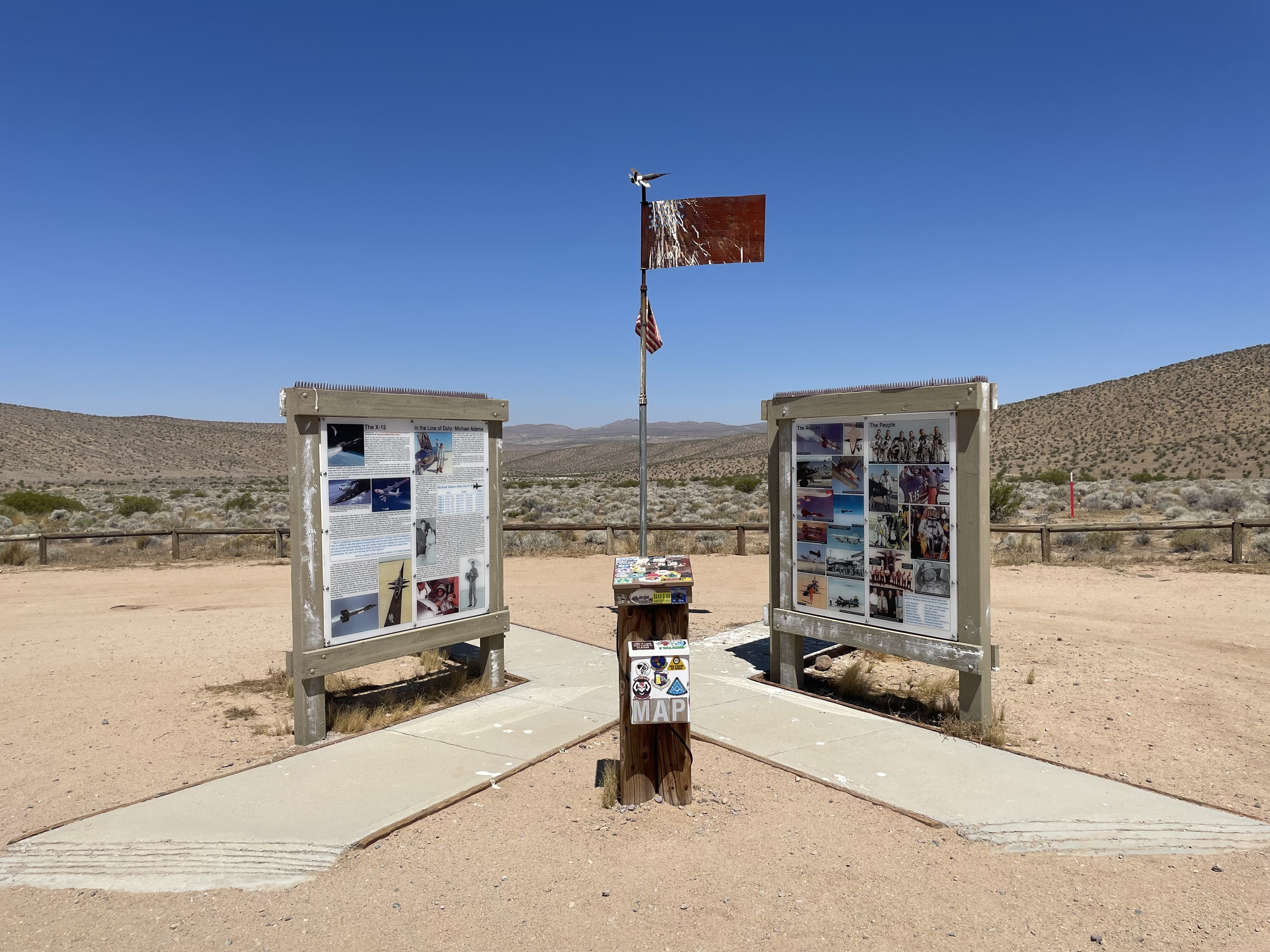
Memorial at the crash site

Adams was awarded astronaut wings posthumously. His name appears on the Space Mirror Memorial.
