= KGIL =

KGIL may refer to:

- KRAJ (FM), a radio station (98.5 FM) licensed to serve Johannesburg, California, United States, which held the call sign KGIL from 2011 to 2026
- KKAR, a radio station (1260 AM) licensed to serve Beverly Hills, California, which held the call sign KGIL from 1947 to 1993, from 1997 to 2000, and from 2007 to 2011
- KBUA, a radio station (94.3 FM) licensed to serve San Fernando, California, which held the call sign KGIL-FM from 1976 to 1989
