= Cuddeback Airfield =

Former training installation in the Mojave Desert, California

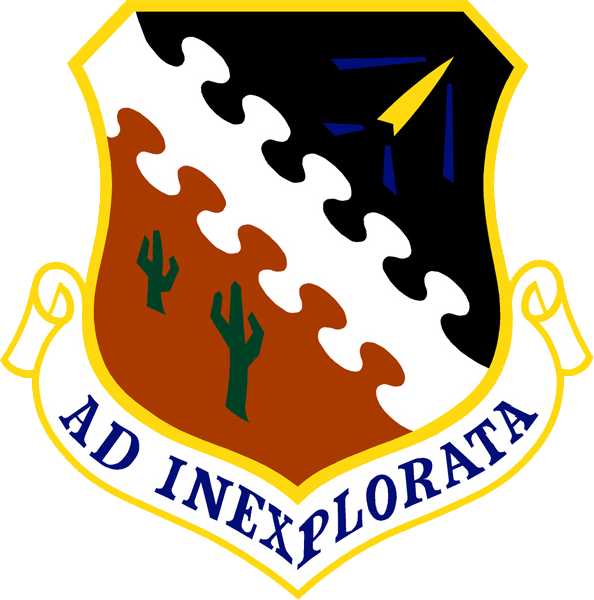
Cuddeback Airfield
- Part of George Air Force Base
- Cuddeback Lake, Mojave Desert, California; Near Edwards AFB / Mojave, California in United States

Site information
- Type: Air-to-ground gunnery range and emergency landing strip
- Owner: United States Department of Defense (formerly)
- Operator: United States Air Force
- Controlled by: Air Force Flight Test Center / George Air Force Base
- Condition: Abandoned
- Other facilities: Camera targets and gunnery targets

Location
- Location in California Cuddeback Airfield (the United States)
- Coordinates: 35°16′50″N 117°23′54″W

Site history
- Built: 1955; 71 years ago
- Built for: Air-to-ground gunnery and emergency landing
- Built by: United States Air Force
- In use: 1959 - 1983
- Fate: Closed
- Events: 15 November 1967 X-15 crash in which USAF astronaut Michael J. Adams lost his life.

Garrison information
- Designations: Cuddeback Air-to-Ground Gunnery Range, Cuddeback Lake Air Force Range

Test information
- Training: Simulated low-level nuclear delivery training (with NAS China Lake); air-to-ground gunnery and bombing practice
- Remediation: None

Airfield information
- Identifiers: LID: CUD
- Elevation: 700 feet (210 m) AMSL
Runways
Direction	Length and surface
01/19	3,018.37 feet (920.00 m)
- Other airfield facilities: Camera targets for X-15 program, gunnery scoring targets

Cuddeback Airfield, also known as Cuddeback Air-to-Ground Gunner Range and Cuddeback Lake Air Force Range (NASA LID: CUD) was an air-to-ground military training facility and emergency landing strip located on Cuddeback Lake in Mojave Desert, California. It was operated by the United States Air Force from 1959 until 1983, supporting live-fire strafing, bombing, and missile training for fighter and attack aircraft, including the Republic F-105 Thunderchief and McDonnell Douglas F-4 Phantom II. The range was also designed for the X-15 program, equipped with camera targets. The airfield operated in coordination with the nearby Edwards Air Force Base and George Air Force Base, and personnel were often rotated by helicopters due to its remote location.

== History ==
Cuddeback Lake is mentioned in a 1896 newspaper article and a 1915 USGS Map. It is sometimes misspelled as "Cuddleback". Cuddeback Airfield was built between 1932-33 in the middle of Cuddeback Dry Lake, serving as an auxiliary airfield. By 1937, it operated both as an auxiliary airfield and civil airport, with a 15,840 x 5,280 feet long clay landing area. It was used by the United States Army as an artillery range. Between 1940-41, the airfield was abandoned. In 1955, the United States Air Force (USAF) acquired Cuddeback range, and purchased an additional 37.82 acres of adjacent land. Beginning in 1959, the Cuddeback Dry Lake Air Strip was used as an emergency landing site in preparation of the North American X-15 program. Subsequently, NASA designated the airfield and the adjacent dry lake as a launch site and drop-zone, named Cuddeback Dry Lake and Cuddeback Dry Lake Drop Zone. In June 1963, Cuddeback Airfield was converted to the Cuddeback Lake Air Force Range, also known as the Cuddeback Air-to-Ground Gunner Range (Cuddeback AGGR).

Cuddeback Airfield began operating as a drop-zone for air-launched rockets, with runway 01/19 mainly serving emergency landings. Cuddeback Dry Lake additionally operated a range for low-level simulated nuke targeting, which was facilitated by NAS China Lake. On the 500-knot run in, Navy pilots would drop practice bombs as big as 25-lb. Cuddeback Airfield was equipped with strafe lanes, two dive bomb circles, and two target circles. It was also equipped with three asphalt camera targets for the X-15 program, several landfills, ammunition burial pits, and four underground storage tanks. Infrastructure for stationed personnel included two scoring towers, a motor pool barn, a small mess hall, and a small operations building. Weather personnel from Detachment 12 of the 25th Weather Squadron provided meteorological support and forecasts, while range crews scored strafing, bombing, and missile accuracy from the two scoring towers. Due to the remoteness of the airfield, access was done by Huey helicopters. During exercises, Cuddeback Airfield was temporarily staffed with personnel.

On 3 November, 1965, an X-15A-2 External Tank Test was conducted from Edwards AFB, serving as the first flight with empty external tanks. It took off from launch platform NB-52 003, with a maximum altitude around 21,520 meters and maximum speeds at 2,414 kilometres per hour. It airdropped over Cuddeback Dry Lake, with the ammonia tank being recovered while the lox tank was destroyed.

=== 1970s - 1998 ===
From 1975 to 1979, small detachments of 6 men stayed for one week per rotation. Cuddeback Airfield was now under operation by George AFB. F-105 Wild Weasel squadrons recently returned from Southeast Asia conducted range training, along with F-4E Phantom II units. Occasionally, Convair F-106 Delta Darts of the Air Defense Command and Lockheed F-104 Starfighters of the German Air Force training detachments utilized Cuddeback. Bombing & strafing training were also done by the 35th Tactical Fighter Wing, with regular visits by O-2s from Ontario AF Reserve for Forward Air Control operations, marking targets for Thuds & F-4s. By the late 1970s, McDonnell Douglas F-4 Phantom IIs from George AFB experimented with a new video guided missile over Cuddeback. Due to the constant activities, landing at Cuddeback Airfield was unsuitable.

In June 1983, a glider involved in an event lost altitude and conducted an emergency landing at Cuddeback Airfield, almost hitting a guy-wire in the process. The glider landed on a Saturday, while the range was closed, and the aircraft was shortly dismantled and loaded into a vehicle. In 1983, Cuddeback AGGR ceased operations. A clean-up was launched, and ordnance items used and found within the range were 20 MM TP & High Explosive Incendiary, BDU-33 & MK-76 (25-lb practice bombs), MK-106 (5 pound practice bomb), and Napalm fire bombs.

=== Closure ===
Between January-February in 1998, Cuddeback Dry Lake was used for the filming of Madonna’s music video for the song "Frozen". Eventually, Cuddeback Airfield was surplus to the USAF’s needs. On 13 April, 1992, the USAF officially removed Cuddeback Dry Lake from George AFB and Edwards AFB property holdings, ending the Air Force ownership of the land. In 2012, the Air Force transferred ownership of the 2,800 acre gunnery range was given to the Bureau of Land Management. The former buildings at Cuddeback Airfield were dismantled and removed.

== Present ==
In April 2015, eight members from American anarchist group Indecline spent six days spray painting the mural “THIS LAND WAS OUR LAND” on the disused runway of Cuddeback Airfield. The graffiti encompasses the full length and width of the runway, and is claimed to be one of the largest in the world by the group.

In 2015 and 2016, congressional actions allowed the transfer of public lands to the Navy to support the expansion of operations at China Lake's land range complex by 25%. In October 2019, the Navy acquired 33,096 acres of public lands, including the former Cuddeback AGGR, which encompassed 2,800 acres at the time. Navy Region Southwest official determined that there were no environmental impacts, diminishing the need for a full Environmental Impact Statement. Proposed activities included the testing and evaluation of drones, expeditionary warfare training, and ground troop training. New infrastructure upgrades including perimeter fencing, a new access road, portable structures, power generators, and communications systems were also planned. Today, the runway remains intact, with all buildings being removed. It is occasionally used for UAV training.

== Accidents & incidents ==
- On 28 October, 1959, a Lockheed F-104C-5-LO Starfighter registered as serial 56-0915 of the 436th Tactical Fighter Squadron experienced an engine failure due to a fuel loss problem over Cuddeback Gunnery Range. Due to the incident, the aircraft was written off from operation.
- On 19 July, 1960, a Lockheed F-104C-5-LO Starfighter registered as serial 56-0906 of the 436th Tactical Fighter Squadron, 479th Tactical Fighter Wing, was on a high altitude dive bomb and a low-angle strafe mission when the aircraft experienced nozzle problems. The aircraft shortly crashed following an emergency landing attempt on Cuddeback Dry Lake, with witnesses reporting a large column of dust as the F-104C touched down. Fire rescue arrived to the scene and extinguished a fire on the tailpipe. The pilot of the aircraft, Captain John Houston, was found dead in a "jack-knifed" position by the witnesses.
- On 24 April, 1963, a Lockheed F‑104C‑5‑LO Starfighter registered as serial 56-0918 of the 436th Tactical Fighter Squadron, 479th Tactical Fighter Wing crashed at Cuddeback Gunnery Range due to a controlled flight into terrain. During a live-fire fire exercise, the aircraft struck ground obstructions, causing the aircraft to crash and be written off from operation.
- On 24 February 1965, a Lockheed F‑104C‑5‑LO Starfighter registered as serial 56-0931 of the 435th Tactical Fighter Squadron, 479th Tactical Fighter Wing crashed west of Cuddeback Dry Lake following an engine stall. Subsequently, the aircraft was written off from operation.
- On 8 November, 1965, a Lockheed F-104C-5-LO Starfighter registered as serial 56-0887 of the 476th Tactical Fighter Squadron took off from George AFB for a gunnery session over Cuddeback Range. However, the aircraft suffered engine power loss, causing it to crash 10 miles from Cuddeback Range, fatally wounding USAF pilot Captain Harry W. Martinez. The aircraft was written off after the accident.

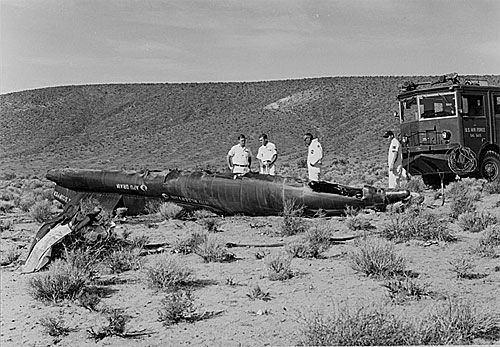
Firefighters survey the wreckage of the X-15 after the crash in which USAF astronaut Michael J. Adams lost his life (Nov. 15, 1967).

- On 15 November, 1967, an X-15-3 piloted by Major Michael J. Adams began deviating as a result of the pilot’s distraction by an electrical disturbance, and his misinterpretation of the instrumentation displayed. Subsequently, the aircraft fell into a spin, and Adams attempted to straighten out the X-15. Despite recovering from the spin at 118,000 feet, the aircraft went into a Mach 4.7 dive, inverted, at an angle between 40 and 45 degrees. By 65,000 feet, the X-15 speeded downwards at Mach 3.93, and experienced over 15 g vertically, exceeding the airframe’s structural limits. The plane broke up into pieces mid-air, before crashing northwest of Cuddeback. An Air Force pilot spotted the main wreckage of the destroyed X-15, and Mike Adams was killed upon impact. On the weekend after the accident, an unofficial search party located the camera, however, the film cartridge was unable to be found. Two weeks after the crash, Engineer Victor Horton organised another search, and the cassette was found, which was flown to Boston for processing. Michael Adams was posthumously awarded the Adams Astronaut Wings for his last flight, as he surpassed an altitude of 50 miles above the Earth’s surface. His name was also added to the Space Mirror Memorial at the Kennedy Space Museum in 1991. On June 8, 2004, a memorial monument to Adams was built near the crash site as a part of an Eagle Scout project.
