= Eric Skotnes =

American urban artist and muralist

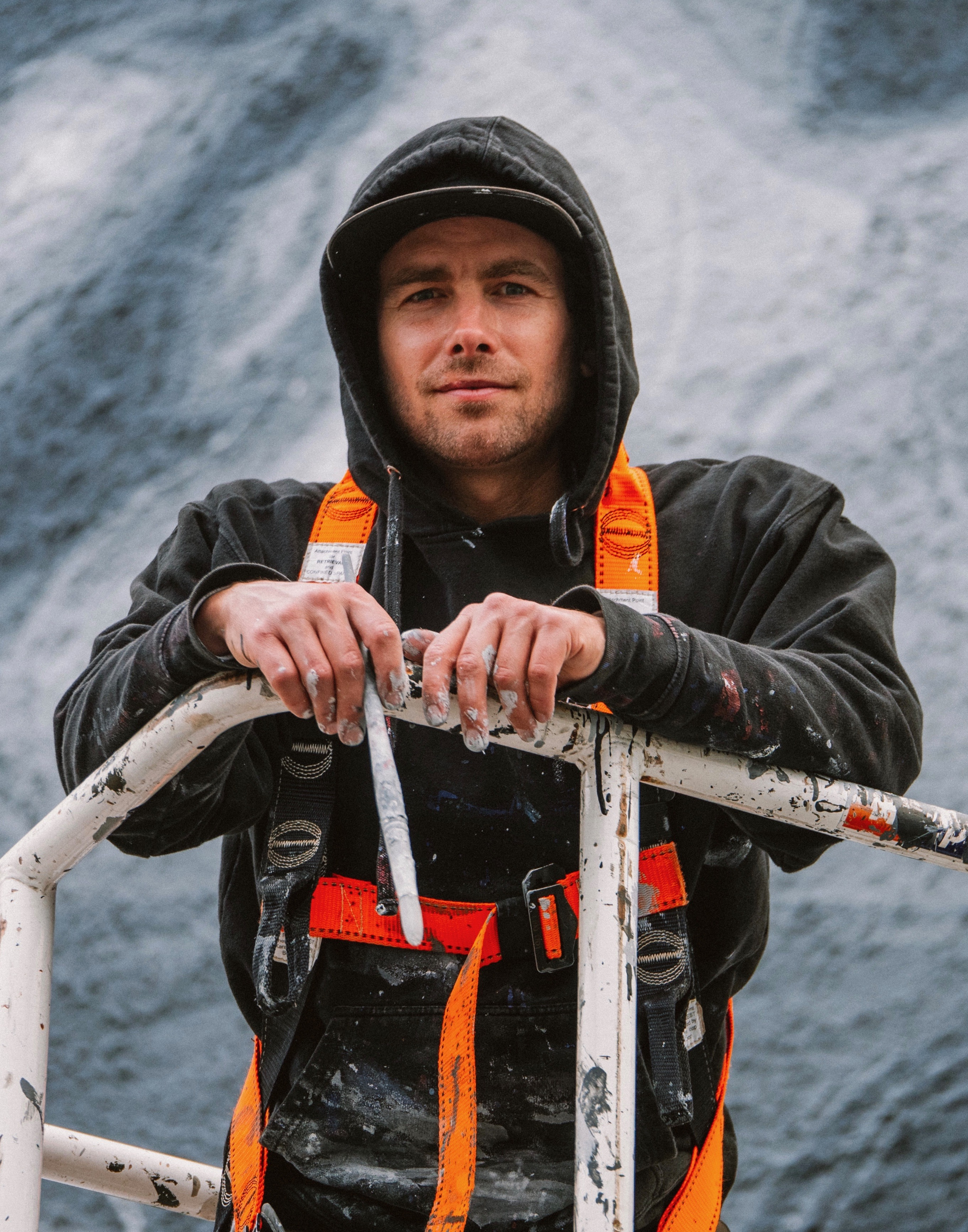
- Skotnes in 2020, in New Zealand
- Education: ArtCenter College of Design, Pasadena
- Known for: public art, murals, painting
- Website: www.ericskotnes.net

Eric Skotnes is an urban artist based in Los Angeles, best known for his large-scale murals that blend the aesthetics of graffiti with classical figuration.

== Early life ==
Skotnes began writing graffiti when he was 11 years old, writing under the moniker Zoueh. He studied illustration and fine art at the ArtCenter College of Design, where he was introduced to classical art and figurative painting. Skotnes has painted graffiti and figurative and abstract work for studio productions, including Brooklyn Nine-Nine, The Good Place and The Last Man on Earth.

== Career ==
Skotnes has painted large-scale murals throughout the United States, in cities ranging from Tulsa, Oklahoma to Cedar Rapids, Iowa to Los Angeles, California. Internationally, Skotnes has painted public murals in New Zealand, Peru and Colombia. The subjects of his murals are often inspired by art history, Neoclassicism, and the local community and history of the city in which he's painting. Skotnes has worked with political activist art collective Indecline, notably on an evolving mural entitled The Picture of Donald J. Trump based on Oscar Wilde’s gothic novel, The Picture of Dorian Gray (1890).

=== Blue Zeus, 2019 ===
In 2019, Skotnes collaborated with UCLA to paint the first eco-mural using solar reflective material as paint. The mural, a 27 foot high depiction of Greek god Zeus, was created to encourage conversations surrounding climate change and the urban heat island effect.

=== The Journey, 2019 ===
Skotnes collaborated with fellow muralist Ryan Sarfati, who goes by Yanoe, on three 11-story murals in Columbus, Ohio, collectively entitled The Journey. One of the murals includes the figure of a Somali woman, a depiction of Hodan Mohammed, who is a leader of local Somali community organizations. Skotnes was inspired by the fact that Columbus is home to the second largest population of Somali immigrants and hopes the work will symbolize fortitude and hope to its viewers.

=== The Majestic, 2021 ===
Skotnes and Yanoe painted the world's largest augmented reality artwork at the time of its unveiling. The mural, entitled The Majestic, is located in Tulsa, Oklahoma and is named after the theater that once stood on the site. Inspired by the art deco heritage of the city, this work celebrates local culture and flora and fauna common in the state. In addition to the two-dimensional mural, the artists painted a QR code on the mural which unlocks a three-dimensional augmented reality version with flying butterflies, swimming fish and passing clouds. The mural was commissioned by the Tulsa Parking Authority and was supported by the Arts Commission of the City of Tulsa.

=== Fabric of Life, 2023 ===
Skotnes collaborated with Yanoe to paint a mural in San Juan Bautista, celebrating cultural, environmental and historical motifs. Funded by Caltrans as part of Governor Gavin Newsom’s Clean California Initiative, The Fabric of Life tells the story of San Juan's ranching history and El Teatro Campesino.
