= Yellow Aster Mine =

Former gold mine in California

Yellow Aster
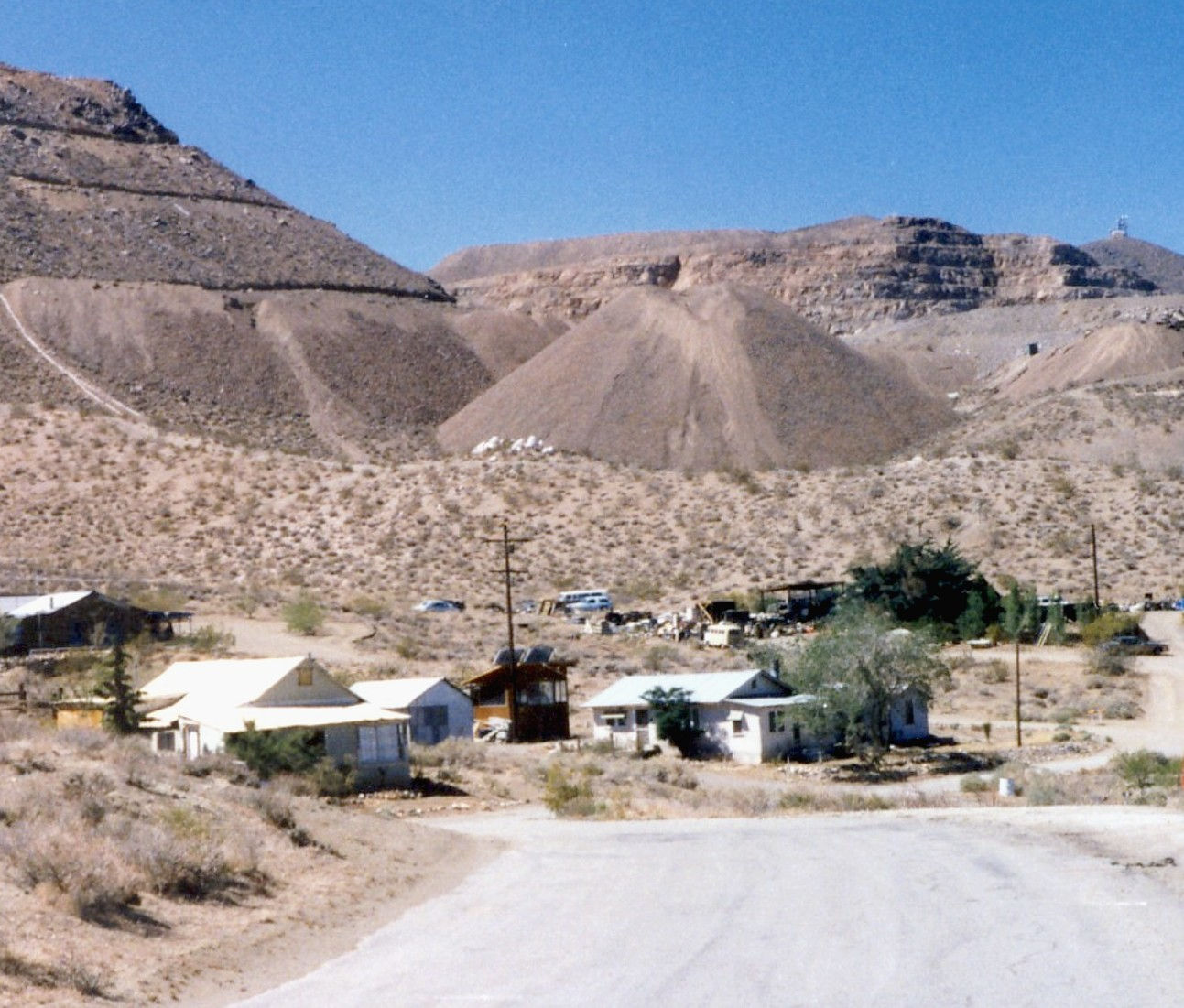
- The tailing of Yellow Aster above Randsburg
- Interactive map of Yellow Aster
- Location: near Randsburg, California; 35°21′25″N 117°39′46″W
- Products: Gold
- Type: Mine

Yellow Aster Mine was a large gold mine in Southern California.

== Discovery ==
In 1894, prospectors Frederic Moores and William Langdon ventured into the Red Mountain range in the Mojave Desert, where they discovered trace amounts of gold. The next year, Mooers returned with John Singleton and Charles Burcham to search again. They discovered a significant gold vein that surfaced near the top of Rand Mountain and formed the Yellow Aster Mining and Milling Company to exploit their claim.

== Development ==
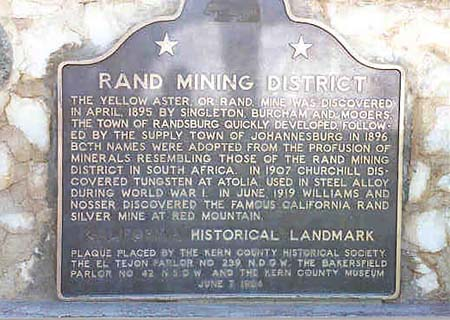
Historical marker for the Yellow Aster Mine

On 20 December 1895, the Rand Mining District was organized. A tent city grew at the foot of the mountain and was named Randsburg. By December 1896, 1500 people were living and working there and several new mines had been dug around the Yellow Aster claim. By the end of 1897, more than $600,000 (equivalent to $23,220,000 in 2025) of gold had been produced in the Rand Mining District, mostly from Yellow Aster.

Initially, gold ore was shipped to processing mills at Garlock and later Barstow, via the newly opened Randsburg Railway. Shipping the heavy ore limited the amount of gold that could be produced, so the company built a thirty-stamp mill on site, which opened in early 1899. In 1901, a second mill with 100 stamps was opened to increase capacity further. By the end of 1901, Yellow Aster was producing $120,000 (equivalent to $4,644,000 in 2025) of gold per month.

The gold ore was primarily accessed through a series of horizontal tunnels at multiple levels on the mountainside. A glory hole was also dug down from the top of the mountain to reach the porphyry deposits.

== Geology ==
The main gold-bearing body was a monzonite intrusion containing high-grade gold veins, surrounded by porphyry containing low-grade granular gold.

== Productive era ==
Between 1901 and 1905, production was concentrated on the monzonite intrusion. The rock was extracted using the square set timbering method. By 1905, all of the monzonite had been removed, leaving a cavern 100 feet (30 m) high, 100 feet (30 m) wide and over 1,500 feet (460 m) long. Work then focused on removing the porphyry which contained less gold per ton of rock.

== Transport ==
From the time of its formation, Yellow Aster had a series of hand-worked 18 in (457 mm) gauge tramways. External inclines were used to connect the tunnel portals with the loading point for the wagon trains to Garlock.

When the first mill was built a new tunnel, known as Rand Level, was developed with a long 18-inch gauge tramway through it. This became the mine's principal transport link, and the inclines were quickly abandoned. Ore was dropped from higher levels through underground chutes, and raised from lower levels using underground haulage inclines.

After 1905, the volume of ore that needed to be extracted increased dramatically as the low-grade porphyry was worked. The company purchased a 15 horsepower (11 kW) gasoline locomotive from the Union Gas Engine company in San Francisco, this was the first gasoline locomotive used in a mine in California and one of the earliest internal combustion locomotives in the United States. The locomotive was 2 ft 6 in (762 mm) gauge and could haul 30 tons at 6 miles per hour (9.7 km/h) on the level. Initially a third rail was laid along Rand Level to allow the locomotive to haul the 18-inch gauge wagons, but the line was soon relaid to 30-inch gauge.

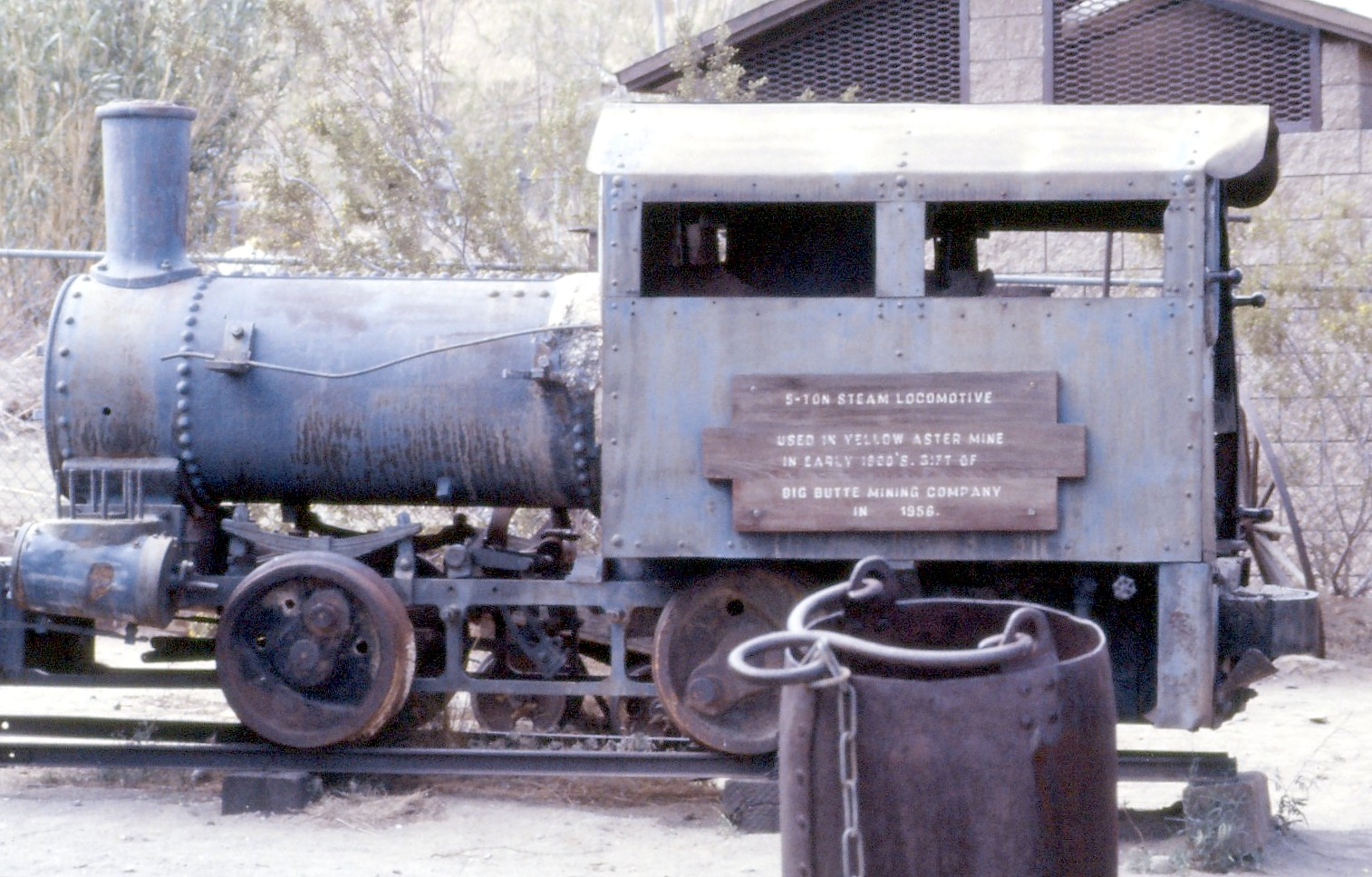
The surviving Porter locomotive from the Yellow Aster Mine

In 1909, a 25 horsepower (19 kW) 0-4-0ST steam locomotive was purchased from H.K. Porter, Inc. It was a B-S class locomotive, modified to work through the Rand Level tunnel. Two further locomotives to the same basic design arrived in 1910. The steam locomotives operated the Rand Level tunnel, and the Union Gas locomotive shunted ore cars on the surface lines.

The steam locomotives were phased out by 1930, replaced by two Plymouth Locomotive Works Model FMs. One of the Porters was sold to the nearby Big Butte Mine where it worked as a stationary engine. It was donated to the Rand Desert Museum in Randsburg.
