= KWDJ (AM) =

- Ridgecrest, California; United States
- Frequency: 1360 kHz
- Branding: 1360 Country Gold

Programming
- Format: Classic country
- Affiliations: Los Angeles Rams

Ownership
- Owner: Robert Adelman; (Adelman Broadcasting, Inc.)

History
- First air date: April 7, 1974
- Former call signs: KZIQ (1974–2001)

Technical information
- Licensing authority: FCC
- Facility ID: 30157
- Class: D
- Power: 1,000 watts (day); 31 watts (night)
- Transmitter coordinates: 35°36′57.8″N 117°38′38.2″W

Links
- Public license information: Public file; LMS
- Website: 1360kwdj.com

KWDJ (1360 AM, "1360 Country Gold") is a commercial radio station licensed to and serving Ridgecrest, California, United States. The station is owned by Adelman Broadcasting, Inc. and broadcasts a classic country format.

== History ==
The station first signed on April 7, 1974, as KZIQ. Originally owned by Space/Time Broadcasting Company, it aired a country music format. In June 1986, Space/Time sold KZIQ and its FM sister station KZIQ-FM to Bel Air Broadcasting Corporation, owned by Robert M. Rosenthal, for $335,000.

Bel Air attempted to sell KZIQ-AM-FM in 1991, but the first two deals fell through. The first deal reached was in January with Michaels Media, headed by Pat Michaels, for $650,000. In March, a sale to Blessing Broadcasting valued at $682,500 also failed to close. By the end of the year, Bel Air successfully sold the combo to James Knudsen for $250,000 — less than half of either previous deal. At the time, KZIQ aired an oldies/classic rock format.

On May 21, 2001, KZIQ changed its call letters to KWDJ. In May 2006, KWDJ flipped from country music to talk radio as "Fox Radio 1360". Featured talk shows included The Rush Limbaugh Show, The Glenn Beck Radio Program, The John Gibson Show, and The Alan Colmes Show. The station aired Fox Sports Radio programming on weekends.

In January 2013, James and Donna Knudsen sold KWDJ and KZIQ-FM to Adelman Broadcasting for $220,000. The deal included a time brokerage agreement allowing Adelman to begin programming the station immediately; the sale closed in April. Until early 2014, KWDJ aired a sports format as a Fox Sports Radio affiliate.

In 2016, the station became a radio affiliate of the Los Angeles Rams of the National Football League.
