= Randsburg Railway =

Former railroad

Overview
- Locale: Johannesburg, California
- Dates of operation: January 17, 1898 – December 30, 1933

Technical
- Track gauge: 4 ft 8 1/2 in (1,435 mm) standard gauge
- Length: 28.5-mile (45.9 km)

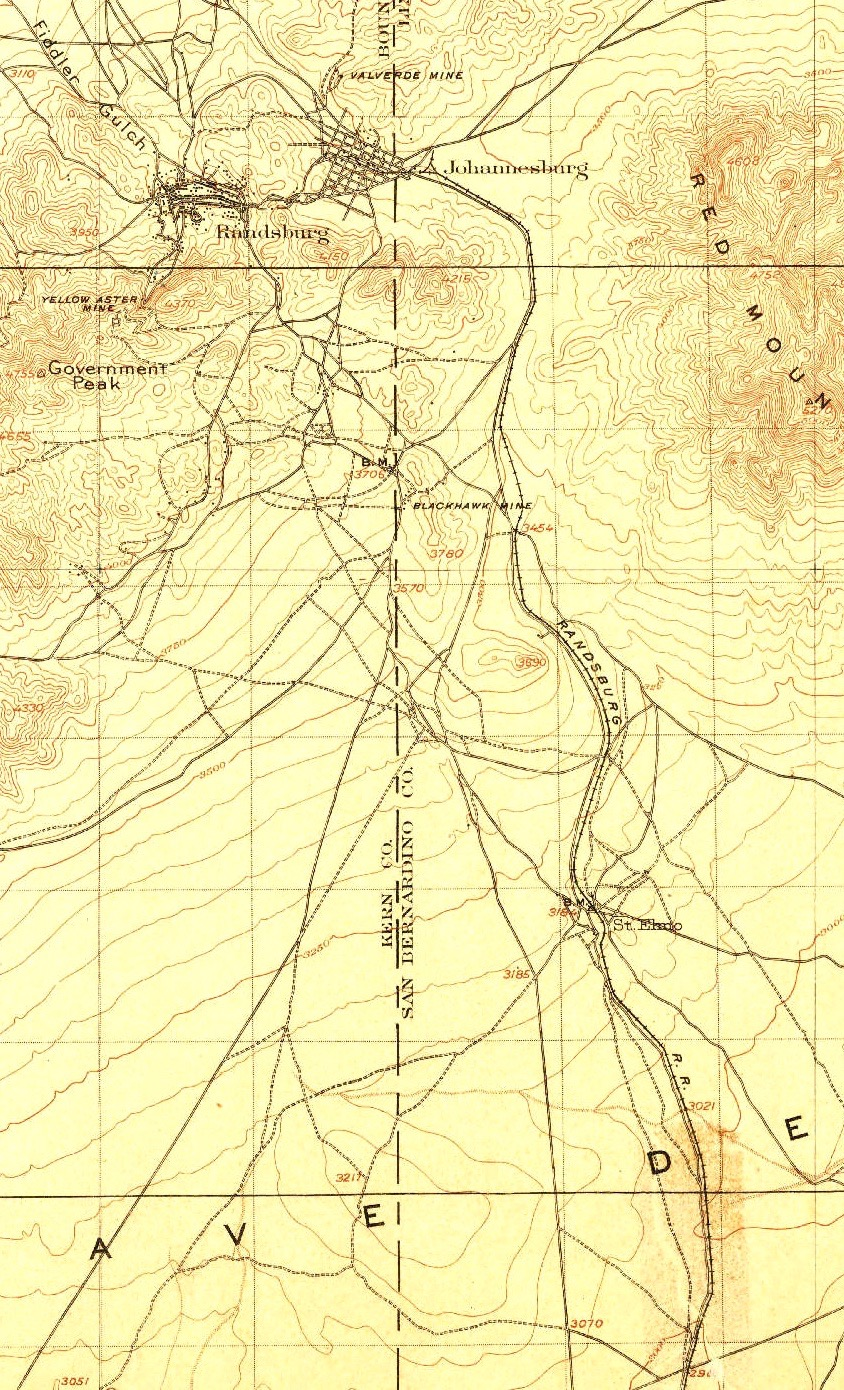
Route in 1903

The Randsburg Railway was a 28.5-mile (45.9 km) branch line railroad in California's Mojave Desert. It originated at the main line of the Atchison, Topeka, and Santa Fe Railroad (AT&SF) at Kramer Junction, California, and terminated at Johannesburg, California, with a stop at Atolia. The Railway served as a supply link to the Rand Mine, which produced more silver than any mine in California. The Rand mine closed in 1929, as it was no longer profitable.

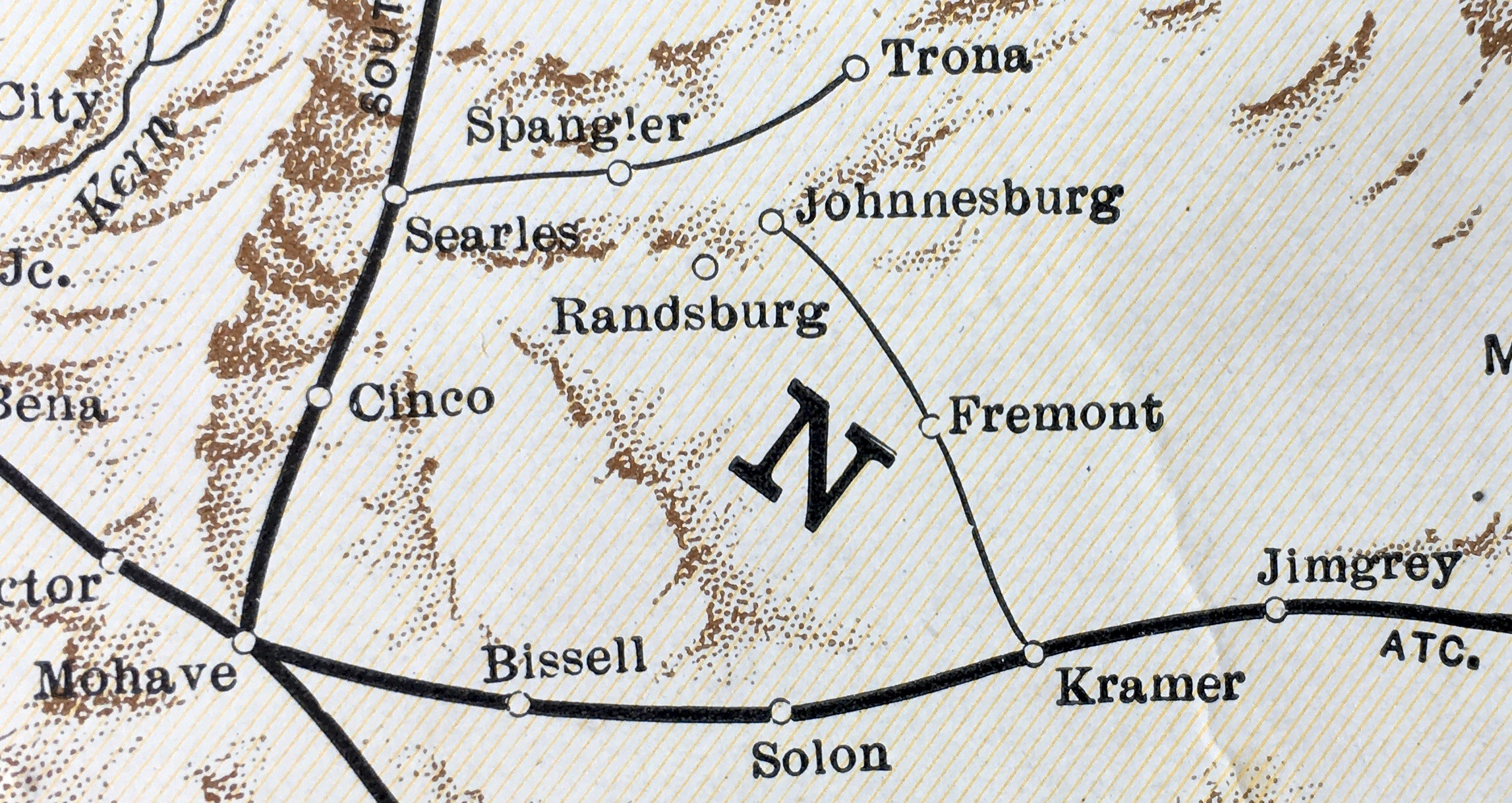
Route in 1930

The line was completed on January 5, 1898, and began operation on January 17, 1898. The railway was acquired by the AT&SF in 1903. During its 35-year history, the Randsburg Railway served a number of local mining operations; it also provided passenger service.

The Randsburg Railway ceased operations on December 30, 1933, a victim of the Great Depression and a decline in the mining industry. The rails were removed the following year. Portions of the grade are still visible along U.S. Route 395 between Kramer and Johannesburg.

== See also ==
- Trona Railway
- Calico and Odessa Railroad
- Death Valley Railroad
