= Indecline =

American art collective

- Movement: Contemporary art, street art, graffiti, activism
- Website: http://thisisindecline.com; http://www.ryenmcpherson.com

Indecline, stylized as INDECLINE, is an American Anarchist art collective. Members have said that the collective was formed in 2001 and is decentralized, with "dozens" of members in affiliated groups in several US states and a few foreign countries, and have characterized it as "[an] underground movement [of] activists, musicians, graffiti writers, [and] photographers". In 2014, two core members of the group, including founder Ryen McPherson, were arrested for mailing a "preserved baby’s head, foot and other human body parts" that they had stolen from a Thai medical museum.

== Projects ==
=== Bumfights: A Cause For Concern ===
In 2002 Ryen McPherson, Daniel Tanner, and others operating as Indecline Films produced the first video in the Bumfights series, Bumfights: A Cause for Concern. They subsequently took down the Indecline Films website, and have said they sold the rights to the series to two investors.

=== Indecline Volume One: It's Worse Than You Think ===
In 2004, Indecline came out with a new raw unfiltered video under the name of "it's worse than you think". In this video featured; exploited homeless people, people with physical deformities being mocked by the filmmakers, street fights, riots, and in later versions adding graffiti and skateboarding to the mix. There were multiple versions released adding & cutting content roughly between 2004–2006. Advertisements for the film were also put on a graffiti magazine in 2007 called, "Spreading The Disease Issue #1" Also, according to an archived page of Indecline.com in early 2005, the DVD's were sold in limited quantities Indecline

=== Dying for Work ===
In August 2012, the group installed a billboard on Interstate 15 in Las Vegas with Dying for Work in black lettering on a white background and a dummy hanging from it by a noose; a companion billboard, also with a hanged man, read "Hope you're happy Wall St."

=== Largest Piece of Illegal Graffiti ===
In April 2015, eight people spent six days creating a piece of illegal graffiti, claimed to be the largest in the world: "This land was our land", painted on a disused military runway of Cuddeback Airfield in the Mojave Desert (35°16′50″N 117°23′52″W) It stretches for 850 m (0.53 mi) in letters 14 m (46 ft) high.

=== Rape Mural ===
In October 2015, in response to Donald Trump's falsely calling illegal immigrants "rapists", the group spray-painted a mural depicting Trump with the slogan "¡Rape Trump!" on an old border wall on US territory approximately a mile from the Tijuana airport.

=== Hollywood Walk of Fame ===
In March 2016, members of the group glued names of African-Americans killed by police over names on the Hollywood Walk of Fame, and also glued the Indecline logo to the stars.

=== Donald Trump Statues ===
On August 18, 2016, using industrial epoxy, the group glued life-sized nude statues of Trump to the sidewalk in five cities: Cleveland, Los Angeles, New York, San Francisco, and Seattle.

=== Rail Beast ===
In September 2017 Indecline broke into Union Pacific's Milford Utah yard and vandalized several engines parked on the south end of the yard at Lund Siding. One of them was painted like a tiger. Union Pacific Railroad Police has placed a $300.000 bounty on Indecline for vandalism and has moved some of the engines stored at Lund to Warm Springs Yard in Salt Lake City, Utah. The engine in question UP #2519 was taken out of storage at Lund to nearby Milford and the graffiti was stripped off with primer before the engine was sent to Jenks Shops in North Little Rock, Arkansas, for a full overhaul. The engine returned to service in 2019 and is still running but now has a flag decal on the long hood.

=== Ku Klux Klowns ===
In August 2017, Heather Heyer was murdered by a white supremacist at the 2017 Unite the Right rally in Charlottesville. In response, Indecline installed eight effigies of hanging clowns dressed as members of the Ku Klux Klan in Richmond's Bryan Park. A sign on one of the effigies read: "If attacked by a mob of clowns, go for the juggler". A video published online by Indecline includes footage of the clowns being assembled and mounted at dusk by people wearing masks. The video includes dialogue from a decades-old episode of the Superman radio show that ridiculed the KKK, interspersed with a Klan anthem featuring the lyrics: "Stand up and be counted/show that world that you're a man ... join the Ku Klux Klan".

=== Freedom Kick ===
In September 2020, the group began a project alongside Spanish artist Eugenio Merino called Freedom Kick, where they order silicone replicas of the head of famous world leaders and distribute them around the world to be used as soccer balls. The games are recorded and uploaded to their Instagram account. Some of the world leaders included Donald Trump, Vladimir Putin and Jair Bolsonaro. After releasing Bolsonaro's video, members of the group received death threats.

== See also ==
- Protest art
