= KGBB =

Radio station in Edwards, California, United States

- Edwards, California; United States
- Broadcast area: Antelope Valley
- Frequency: 103.9 MHz
- Branding: 103.9 Bob FM

Programming
- Format: Adult hits
- Affiliations: Bob FM

Ownership
- Owner: Adelman Broadcasting, Inc.
- Sister stations: KLOA; KEPD; KWDJ-FM

History
- First air date: March 1990
- Former call signs: KRAJ (1988–1998); KEDD (1998–2007)

Technical information
- Licensing authority: FCC
- Facility ID: 457
- Class: A
- ERP: 6,000 watts
- HAAT: 100 meters (330 ft)
- Transmitter coordinates: 34°58′44.9″N 118°10′5.2″W

Links
- Public license information: Public file; LMS
- Website: bobfm1039.com

KGBB (103.9 FM, "Bob FM") is a commercial radio station licensed to Edwards, California, United States, and serves the Antelope Valley area. The station is owned by Adelman Broadcasting, Inc. and broadcasts an adult hits format under the "Bob FM" moniker.

== History ==
The station first signed on in March 1990 as KRAJ, originally licensed to Johannesburg, California. The transmitter was located on El Paso Peak with an effective radiated power of 1,500 watts at a height above average terrain of 27 meters (89 ft). Owned by Robert Adelman from its launch, KRAJ aired a hot adult contemporary (hot AC) format as "103.9 The Zone" in 1991.

In 1999, the station flipped to a regional Mexican format as "Radio Exitos" with new call letters KEDD. KRAJ's call sign and hot AC format moved to a new signal on 100.9 FM.

In 2006, the transmitter was moved from El Paso Peak to a new location adjacent to that of KTPI-FM. The format changed to adult hits as "Bob FM" shortly thereafter, and the call letters were changed to KGBB.
