= KRAJ (FM) =

Radio station in Johannesburg, California

- Johannesburg, California; United States
- Broadcast area: Ridgecrest, California
- Frequency: 98.5 MHz
- Branding: 98.5 The Heat

Programming
- Format: Rhythmic adult contemporary

Ownership
- Owner: Adelman Broadcasting, Inc.

History
- First air date: 2013
- Former call signs: KGIL (2011–2026)

Technical information
- Licensing authority: FCC
- Facility ID: 183344
- Class: A
- ERP: 340 watts
- HAAT: 417 meters (1,368 ft)
- Transmitter coordinates: 35°28′38″N 117°41′58″W

Links
- Public license information: Public file; LMS
- Website: 985theheat.com

KRAJ is a class A radio station broadcasting a rhythmic adult contemporary format to Johannesburg, California.

== History ==
The station was assigned the call sign KGIL on April 11, 2011. KGIL was owned by Mount Wilson FM Broadcasters as a simulcast of KKGO, its country music station in Los Angeles, until 2015. After Adelman Broadcasting bought the station for $110,000, KGIL replaced the KKGO simulcast with programming from Westwood One's Nash Icon network as "98.5 Nash Icon".

On April 27, 2026, KGIL changed its format from country–by this point featuring a classic country playlist as "98.5 Superstar Country"–to rhythmic adult contemporary, branded as "98.5 The Heat". The format and "Heat" branding were previously used by KRAJ (100.9 FM), which took on a contemporary country format; on May 5, 2026, the KRAJ call sign moved to this station, with 100.9 becoming KWDJ-FM.
