= Cuddeback Lake =

Lake in the state of California, United States

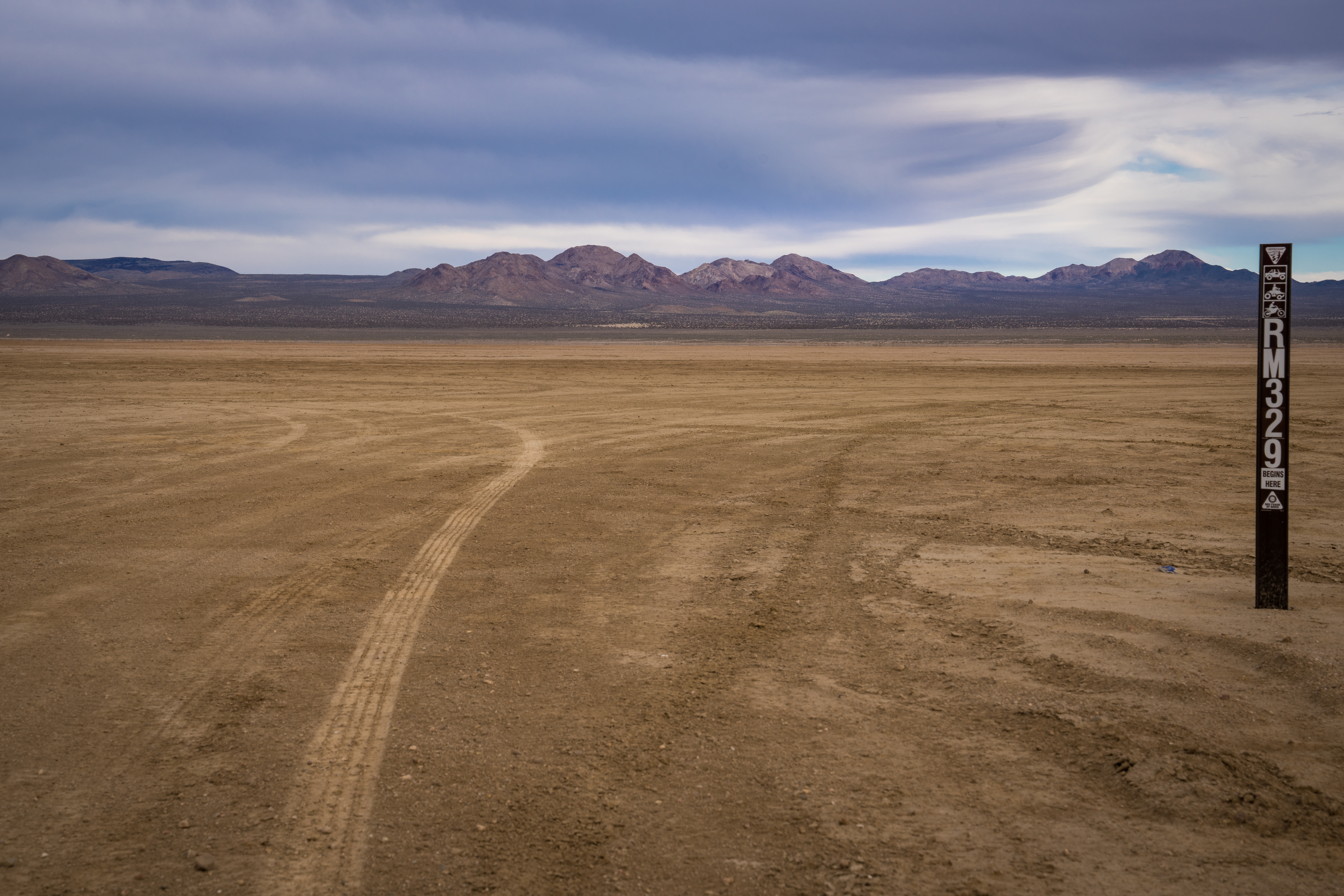

- Location within California Location within the United States
- Location: Mojave Desert; San Bernardino County, California
- Coordinates: 35.2960°N 117.4720°W
- Lake type: Endorheic basin
- Primary outflows: Terminal
- Basin countries: United States
- Max. length: 10 km (6.2 mi)
- Max. width: 4 km (2.5 mi)
- Shore length^{1}: 25 km (16 mi)
- Surface elevation: 778 m (2,552 ft)
- ^{1} Shore length is not a well-defined measure.

Cuddeback Lake is a dry lake in the Mojave Desert of San Bernardino County, California, 60 km (37 mi) northeast of Edwards Air Force Base. The lake is approximately 10 km (6 mi) long and 4 km (2 mi) at its widest point.

== History ==
Cuddeback Lake is mentioned in a 1896 newspaper article and a 1915 USGS Map. The lake is the site of the Cuddeback Lake Air Force Gunnery Range. Cuddeback Lake was also used for the filming of Madonna's "Frozen" music video in January 1998. Many of the scenes in the Disney film Holes were filmed on Cuddeback Lake.

== See also ==
- List of lakes in California
