= KLOA (AM) =

Radio station in Ridgecrest, California

- Ridgecrest, California; United States
- Broadcast area: Indian Wells Valley
- Frequency: 1240 kHz
- Branding: KLOA AM 1240

Programming
- Format: Sports
- Affiliations: Westwood One Sports

Ownership
- Owner: Adelman Broadcasting, Inc.
- Sister stations: KGBB; KEPD; KWDJ-FM

History
- First air date: 1956 (as KRKS)
- Former call signs: KRKS (1956–1961)

Technical information
- Licensing authority: FCC
- Facility ID: 459
- Class: C
- Power: 820 watts
- Transmitter coordinates: 35°38′3.8″N 117°40′18.2″W

Links
- Public license information: Public file; LMS
- Website: 1240kloa.com

KLOA (1240 AM) is a radio station broadcasting a sports format, licensed to and serving Ridgecrest, California, United States. The station is currently owned by Adelman Broadcasting, Inc. and features programming from Westwood One Sports.
