= Randsburg, California =

California Historical Landmark

Randsburg
- Unincorporated community Census Designated Place
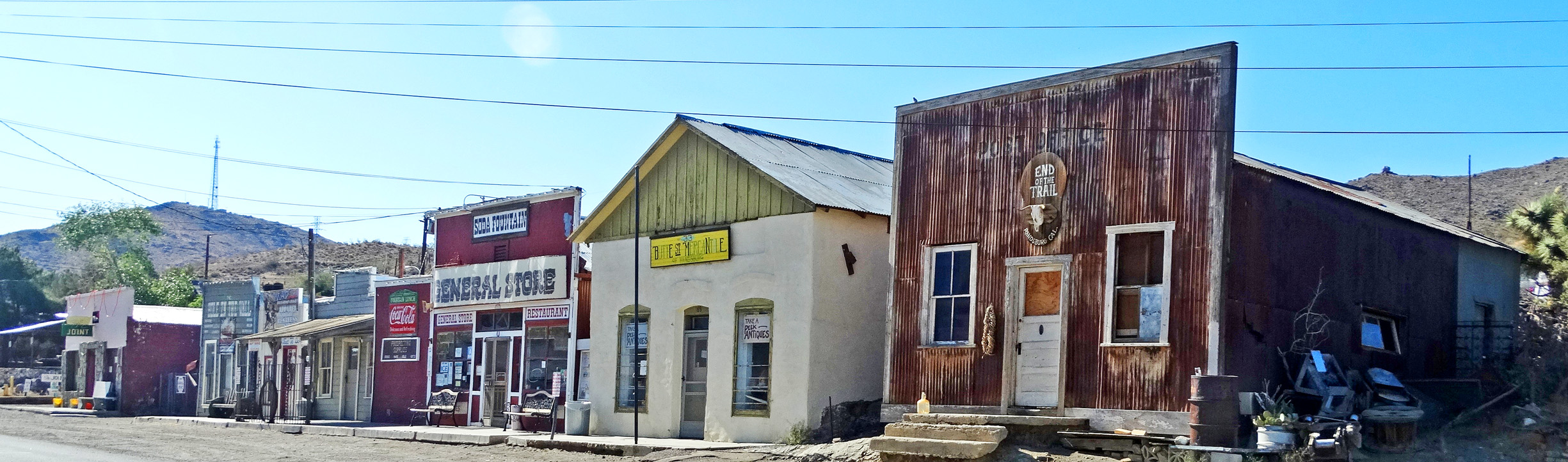

- Location in Kern County and the state of California

- Location in the United States
- Coordinates: 35°22′07″N 117°39′29″W
- Country: United States
- State: California
- County: Kern

Government
  - State senator: Shannon Grove (R)
  - Assemblymember: Tom Lackey (R)
  - U. S. rep.: Jay Obernolte (R)

Area
  - Total: 1.945 sq mi (5.037 km^{2})
  - Land: 1.906 sq mi (4.936 km^{2})
  - Water: 0.039 sq mi (0.101 km^{2}) 2.0%
- Elevation: 3,504 ft (1,068 m)

Population (2020)
  - Total: 45
  - Density: 24/sq mi (9.1/km^{2})
- Time zone: UTC-8 (Pacific)
  - Summer (DST): UTC-7 (PDT)
- ZIP code: 93554
- Area codes: 442/760
- FIPS code: 06-59668
- GNIS feature ID: 1661284

Randsburg (formerly Rand Camp) is an unincorporated community in Kern County, California, United States. Randsburg is located 17 miles (27 km) south of Ridgecrest, at an elevation of 3,504 feet (1,068 m). For statistical purposes, the United States Census Bureau has defined the community as a census-designated place (CDP). The population was 45 in the 2020 census, down from 69 in the 2010 census.

== Geography ==
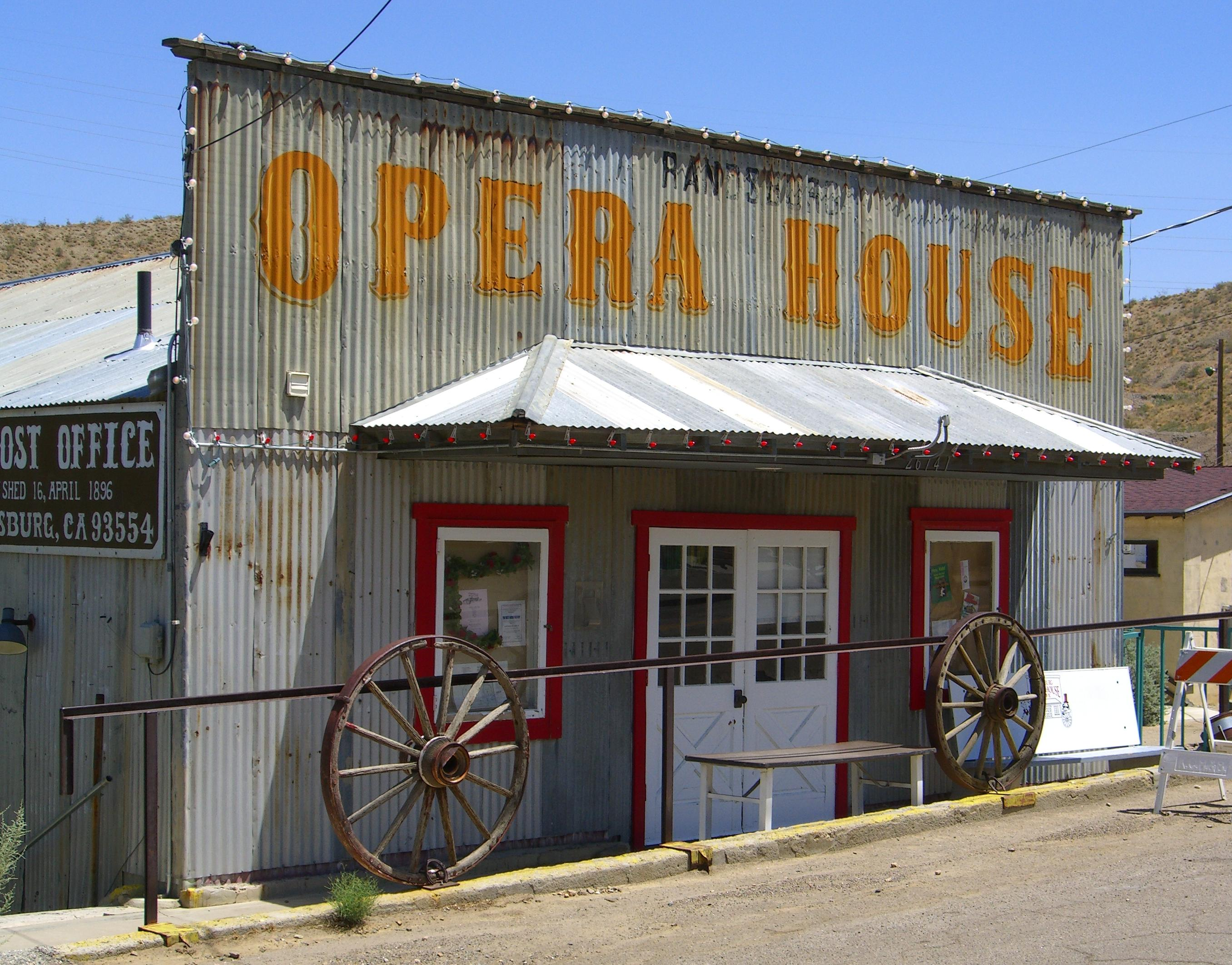
Randsburg Opera House.

Randsburg is located at 35°22′07″N 117°39′29″W. It is on the west side of U.S. Route 395 between Kramer Junction to the south and Ridgecrest to the north. Randsburg is in the Rand Mountains, and is separated by a ridge from the neighboring community of Johannesburg.

According to the United States Census Bureau, the CDP has a total area of 1.945 square miles (5.038 km^{2}), of which 98% is land.

== Climate ==
Randsburg has a cold semi-arid climate (BSk) found on the western edge of the Mojave Desert with very hot, dry summers and cool winters.

Climate data for Randsburg, California, 1991–2020 normals, extremes 1937–present
Month	Jan	Feb	Mar	Apr	May	Jun	Jul	Aug	Sep	Oct	Nov	Dec	Year
Record high °F (°C)	84 (29)	86 (30)	88 (31)	96 (36)	103 (39)	111 (44)	114 (46)	111 (44)	110 (43)	98 (37)	90 (32)	77 (25)	114 (46)
Mean maximum °F (°C)	66.7 (19.3)	69.9 (21.1)	78.6 (25.9)	87.0 (30.6)	94.8 (34.9)	102.6 (39.2)	106.4 (41.3)	104.2 (40.1)	99.4 (37.4)	89.8 (32.1)	77.4 (25.2)	66.5 (19.2)	107.1 (41.7)
Mean daily maximum °F (°C)	58.1 (14.5)	61.4 (16.3)	67.9 (19.9)	75.1 (23.9)	84.4 (29.1)	94.7 (34.8)	100.9 (38.3)	100.1 (37.8)	92.4 (33.6)	80.3 (26.8)	67.2 (19.6)	57.1 (13.9)	78.3 (25.7)
Daily mean °F (°C)	46.6 (8.1)	49.3 (9.6)	54.4 (12.4)	60.6 (15.9)	69.1 (20.6)	78.6 (25.9)	84.7 (29.3)	83.8 (28.8)	77.0 (25.0)	66.1 (18.9)	54.4 (12.4)	45.8 (7.7)	64.2 (17.9)
Mean daily minimum °F (°C)	35.1 (1.7)	37.2 (2.9)	41.0 (5.0)	46.1 (7.8)	53.8 (12.1)	62.5 (16.9)	68.5 (20.3)	67.5 (19.7)	61.5 (16.4)	51.9 (11.1)	41.7 (5.4)	34.5 (1.4)	50.1 (10.1)
Mean minimum °F (°C)	24.2 (−4.3)	27.2 (−2.7)	30.0 (−1.1)	34.4 (1.3)	41.9 (5.5)	49.1 (9.5)	59.6 (15.3)	58.1 (14.5)	50.4 (10.2)	39.6 (4.2)	29.7 (−1.3)	24.7 (−4.1)	21.9 (−5.6)
Record low °F (°C)	4 (−16)	15 (−9)	16 (−9)	23 (−5)	30 (−1)	39 (4)	49 (9)	49 (9)	38 (3)	27 (−3)	12 (−11)	9 (−13)	4 (−16)
Average precipitation inches (mm)	1.38 (35)	1.56 (40)	0.98 (25)	0.38 (9.7)	0.14 (3.6)	0.03 (0.76)	0.23 (5.8)	0.19 (4.8)	0.19 (4.8)	0.47 (12)	0.47 (12)	0.69 (18)	6.71 (171.46)
Average snowfall inches (cm)	0.4 (1.0)	0.3 (0.76)	0.6 (1.5)	0.0 (0.0)	0.0 (0.0)	0.0 (0.0)	0.0 (0.0)	0.0 (0.0)	0.0 (0.0)	0.0 (0.0)	0.1 (0.25)	0.8 (2.0)	2.2 (5.51)
Average precipitation days (≥ 0.01 in)	4.0	4.5	3.5	1.7	1.0	0.2	1.1	0.7	0.7	1.3	1.8	3.3	23.8
Average snowy days (≥ 0.1 in)	0.3	0.4	0.3	0.0	0.0	0.0	0.0	0.0	0.0	0.0	0.1	0.3	1.4
Source 1: NOAA
Source 2: National Weather Service

== History ==
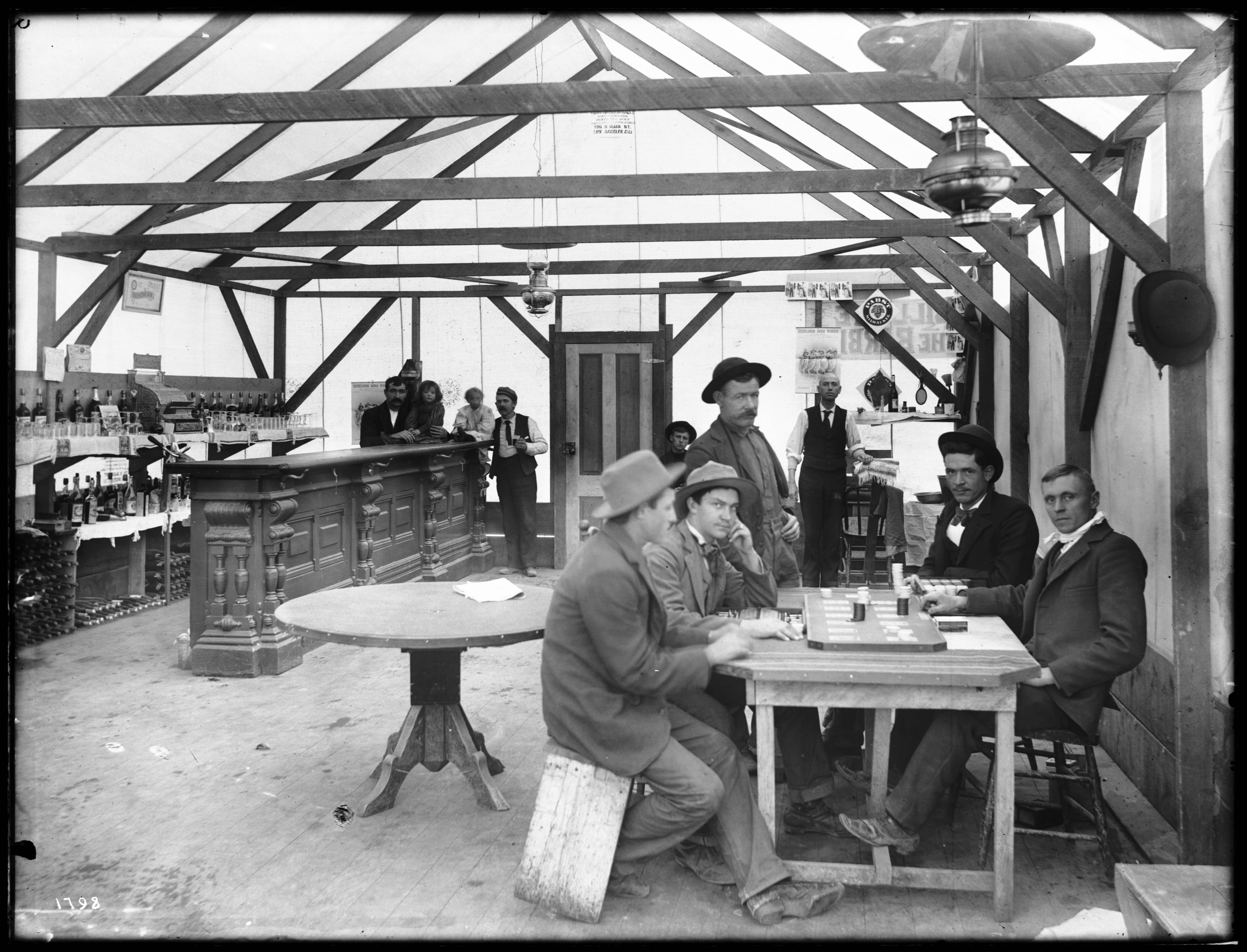
Inside the Yellow Aster Saloon, Randsburg, California, ca.1900 The card game being played is Faro.

Gold was discovered by Frederic Mooers, John Singleton and Charles Burcham at Yellow Aster Mine on 25 April 1895 and a mining camp quickly formed named Rand Camp. Both mine and camp were named after the gold mining region in South Africa.

The Yellow Aster was the first of many gold mines that quickly developed around Rand Camp. The Rand Mining District was created on 20 December 1895. By the end of 1896, the camp was renamed to Randsburg and more than 1500 people lived there. The first post office at Randsburg opened in 1896. By October 1897, the mining district had produced over $600,000 of gold. In 1899, the first stamp mill opened at Yellow Aster.

To expand production at Yellow Aster, a well was dug at Goler and water was pumped up to the mine serving a second mill. This and other district mines were making substantial profits, but pay for the workers was poor and a strike was called in 1903. Yellow Aster's production declined during the First World War, and it closed in 1918. It reopened in 1921 and worked intermittently until 1933 when it was taken over by the Anglo-American Mining Corporation, who sold it in 1940 to John Cummings & Co who worked it until 1956.

In 1983, Glamis Gold purchased Yellow Aster. They untopped the mine. By 2006 all remaining gold-bearing rock had been extracted, and operations ceased for the final time.

== Tourism ==
The town has an influx of tourists throughout the year. Most visitors arrive between autumn and spring due to the extreme heat in summer. The annual Western Days Celebration starts in the third weekend of September, where the town hosts events such as gun fights, panning for gold, live bands, dances and vendors. During Thanksgiving and New Year's Day weekend, off-roading enthusiasts visit via the town's legal off-roading trail. Local shops are usually closed on weekdays, and open during weekends.

== Demographics ==
Historical population
Census	Pop.	Note	%±
2000	77		—
2010	69		−10.4%
2020	45		−34.8%
U.S. Decennial Census; 1860–1870 1880-1890; 1900 1910 1920; 1930 1940 1950; 1960 1970 1980; 1990 2000 2010; 2020

Randsburg first appeared as a census designated place in the 2000 U.S. census.

=== 2020 ===
Randsburg CDP, California – Racial and ethnic composition Note: the US Census treats Hispanic/Latino as an ethnic category. This table excludes Latinos from the racial categories and assigns them to a separate category. Hispanics/Latinos may be of any race.
Race / Ethnicity (NH = Non-Hispanic)	Pop 2000	Pop 2010	Pop 2020	% 2000	% 2010	% 2020
White alone (NH)	65	60	37	84.42%	86.96%	82.22%
Black or African American alone (NH)	0	0	3	0.00%	0.00%	6.67%
Native American or Alaska Native alone (NH)	4	4	0	5.19%	5.80%	0.00%
Asian alone (NH)	0	2	1	0.00%	2.90%	2.22%
Native Hawaiian or Pacific Islander alone (NH)	0	0	0	0.00%	0.00%	0.00%
Other race alone (NH)	0	0	0	0.00%	0.00%	0.00%
Mixed race or Multiracial (NH)	4	1	0	5.19%	1.45%	0.00%
Hispanic or Latino (any race)	4	2	4	5.19%	2.90%	8.89%
Total	77	69	45	100.00%	100.00%	100.00%

=== 2010 ===
At the 2010 census Randsburg had a population of 69. The population density was 35.5 inhabitants per square mile (13.7/km^{2}). The racial makeup of Randsburg was 62 (89%) White, 0 African American, 4 (6%) Native American, 2 (3%) Asian, 0 Pacific Islander, 0 from other races, and 1 (1%) from two or more races. Hispanic or Latino of any race were 2 people (3%).

The whole population lived in households, no one lived in non-institutionalized group quarters and no one was institutionalized. 0 lived in non-institutionalized group quarters, and 0 were institutionalized.

There were 42 households, 1 (2%) had children under the age of 18 living in them, 13 (31%) were opposite-sex married couples living together, 4 (10%) had a female householder with no husband present, 0 had a male householder with no wife present. There were 5 (12%) unmarried opposite-sex partnerships, and 3 (7%) same-sex married couples or partnerships. 17 households (41%) were one person and 6 (14%) had someone living alone who was 65 or older. The average household size was 1.6. There were 17 families (41% of households); the average family size was 2.1.

The age distribution was 2 people (3%) under the age of 18, 2 people (3%) aged 18 to 24, 5 people (7%) aged 25 to 44, 37 people (54%) aged 45 to 64, and 23 people (33%) who were 65 or older. The median age was 59.1 years. For every 100 females, there were 68.3 males. For every 100 females age 18 and over, there were 67.5 males.

There were 97 housing units at an average density of 49.9 per square mile, of the occupied units 39 (93%) were owner-occupied and 3 (7%) were rented. The homeowner vacancy rate was 2%; the rental vacancy rate was 50%. 64 people (93% of the population) lived in owner-occupied housing units and 5 people (7%) lived in rental housing units.

=== 2000 ===
At the 2000 census there were 77 people, 49 households, and 22 families in the CDP. The population density was 39.1 inhabitants per square mile (15.1/km^{2}). There were 109 housing units at an average density of 55.4 per square mile (21.4/km^{2}). The racial makeup of the CDP was 86% White, 5% Native American, 4% from other races, and 5% from two or more races. 5% of the population were Hispanic or Latino of any race. Of the 49 households 4% had children under the age of 18 living with them, 43% were married couples living together, and 53% were non-families. 49% of households were one person and 25% were one person aged 65 or older. The average household size was 1.6 and the average family size was 2.1.

The age distribution was 4% under the age of 18, 3% from 18 to 24, 16% from 25 to 44, 48% from 45 to 64, and 30% 65 or older. The median age was 57 years. For every 100 females, there were 92.5 males. For every 100 females age 18 and over, there were 94.7 males.

The median household income was $48,000 and the median family income was $49,875. Males had a median income of $53,750 versus $21,250 for females. The per capita income for the CDP was $23,602. None of the population and none of the families were below the poverty line.

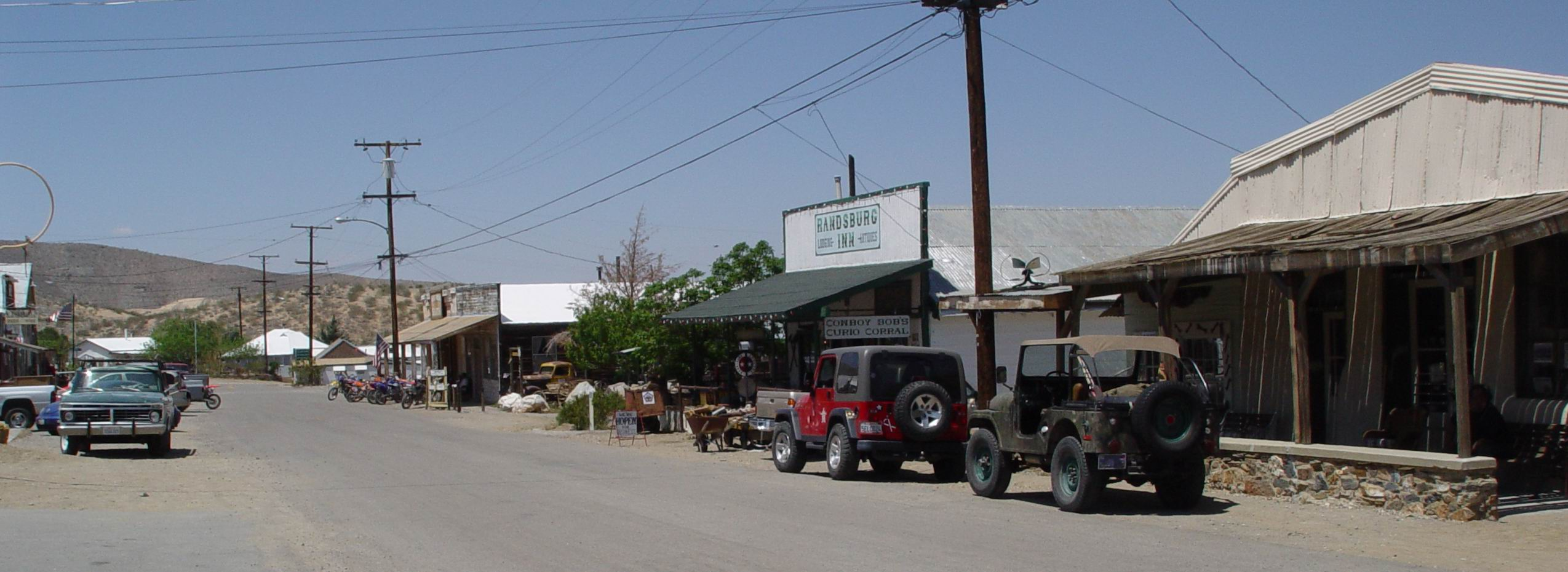
Downtown Randsburg

== Film and video ==
The lost 1913 movie The Mystery of Yellow Aster Mine was filmed in Randsburg.

South of Suez, starring George Brent and released in November 1940, was filmed in Randsburg.

The video for Calvin Harris's platinum single, Feel So Close, was filmed in part in Randsburg. Dwight Yoakam's 1989 video for "Long White Cadillac" was also filmed in the town.

== Rand Mining District ==
Rand Mining District
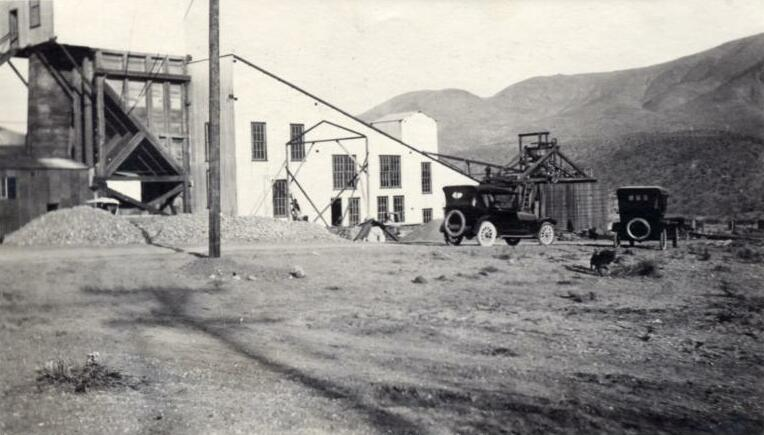
- Rand Silver mill in 1920
- Interactive map of Rand Mining District
- Location: 161 Butte Ave, Randsburg, California, in Kern County, California

California Historical Landmark
- Official name: Rand Mining District
- Designated: May 22, 1957
- Reference no.: 938

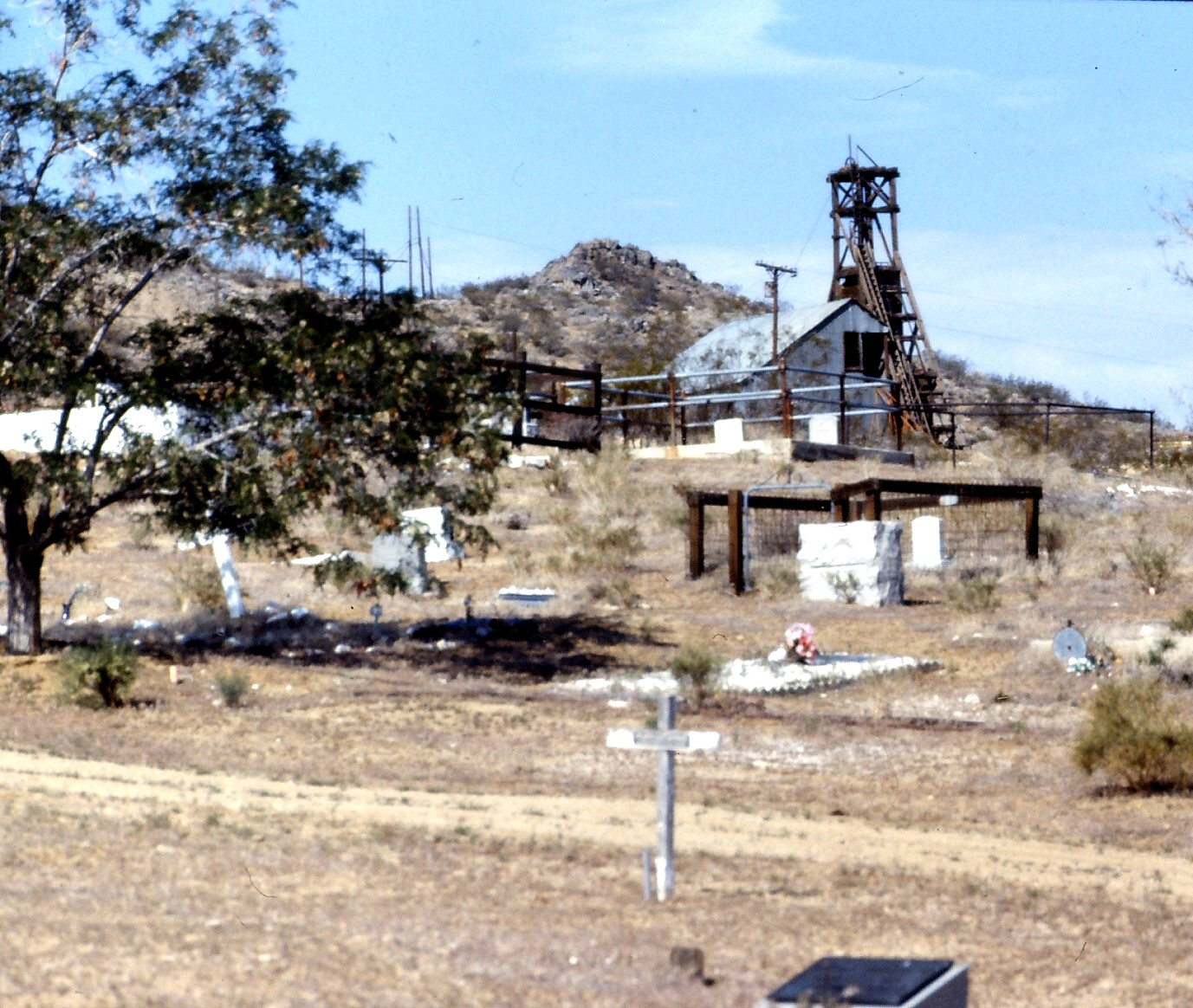
Rand District Cemetery

In Randsburg is California Historical Landmark number 938, the Rand Mining District signed October 12, 1958. The area was home to the Rand Mining District which included the Yellow Aster Mine and the Kelly Mine. The mines started the town of Randsburg in 1895 and later the town of Johannesburg, California and Atolia, California. The Rand Mine produced more silver than any mine in California. The mine closed in 1929 as it was no longer profitable.

In January 1898 Randsburg Railway opened. It ran from Johannesburg to Kramer Junction, California with a stop at Atolia.

Rand Mining District California Historical Landmark reads:

NO. 938 RAND MINING DISTRICT - The Yellow Aster, or Rand, mine was discovered in April 1895 by Singleton, Burcham, and Mooers. The town of Randsburg quickly developed, followed by the supply town of Johannesburg in 1896. Both names were adopted from the profusion of minerals resembling those of the Rand mining district in South Africa. In 1907, Churchill discovered tungsten in Atolia. In June 1919, Williams and Nosser discovered the California Rand Silver Mine at Red Mountain.

== See also ==
- California Historical Landmarks in Kern County
- California Historical Landmark
