= KEPD =

Radio station in Ridgecrest, California

- Ridgecrest, California; United States
- Broadcast area: Indian Wells Valley
- Frequency: 104.9 MHz
- Branding: KePadre 104.9

Programming
- Language: Spanish
- Format: Variety

Ownership
- Owner: Adelman Broadcasting, Inc.
- Sister stations: KGBB; KLOA; KWDJ-FM

History
- First air date: 1979
- Former call signs: KFIO (1979–1989); KLOA-FM (1989–2009)

Technical information
- Licensing authority: FCC
- Facility ID: 458
- Class: B1
- ERP: 1,500 watts
- HAAT: 393 meters (1,289 ft)
- Transmitter coordinates: 35°28′38″N 117°41′59″W

Links
- Public license information: Public file; LMS
- Website: kepadre1049.com

KEPD (104.9 FM, "KePadre 104.9") is a commercial radio station licensed to Ridgecrest, California, United States, and serves the Indian Wells Valley area. The station is owned by Adelman Broadcasting and broadcasts a Spanish variety format.

== History ==
The station first signed on in 1979 as KFIO, the sister station to KLOA (1240 AM). Originally owned by John and Eleanor Quigley, it broadcast a big band music format.

In December 1988, the Quigleys sold KFIO and KLOA to Roy Mayhugh for $552,500. The new owner changed KFIO's call letters to KLOA-FM the following year.

In March 1995, Mayhugh sold KLOA-AM-FM to Adelman Broadcasting for $500,000. At the time, KLOA-FM carried a country music format.

In 2009, KLOA-FM adopted the KEPD call sign. The station flipped from country to a regional Mexican format branded as "KePadre 104.9".

On April 18, 2012, KEPD changed its format to Spanish adult hits, branded as "Juan FM 104.9". The station is the first affiliate of the Juan FM proprietary format that is licensed by Sparknet Communications, creator of the Jack FM adult hits network. At some point later on, it reverted to its previous "KePadre 104.9" branding, with a Spanish variety format.
