= KWDJ-FM =

Radio station in Johannesburg, California, United States

- Johannesburg, California; United States
- Broadcast area: Antelope Valley
- Frequency: 100.9 MHz
- Branding: Thunder Country 100.9

Programming
- Format: Country
- Affiliations: Compass Media Networks

Ownership
- Owner: Adelman Broadcasting, Inc.
- Sister stations: KGBB; KLOA; KEPD

History
- First air date: October 1998
- Former call signs: KRAJ (1998–2026)

Technical information
- Licensing authority: FCC
- Facility ID: 84860
- Class: B1
- ERP: 1,500 watts
- HAAT: 399 meters (1,309 ft)
- Transmitter coordinates: 35°28′38″N 117°41′59″W

Links
- Public license information: Public file; LMS
- Website: thundercountry1009.com

KWDJ-FM (100.9 FM, "Thunder Country 100.9") is a commercial radio station licensed to Johannesburg, California, United States, and serves the Antelope Valley area. The station is owned by Adelman Broadcasting and airs a country music format.

== History ==
The KRAJ call sign originated at the 103.9 MHz frequency, which began broadcasting in August 1988 with an adult contemporary music format called "103.9 The Heat".

The 100.9 MHz frequency first signed on in October 1998 with a new license separate from that of 103.9 FM (now KGBB). At that time, the KRAJ call sign moved to 100.9 FM and "The Heat" rebranded as "The Zone". The Zone sourced its programming primarily from Jones Radio Networks but also aired some shows hosted locally from a studio in Quartz Hill, California. In mid-2004, after KCEL (106.9 FM) dropped oldies in favor of a regional Mexican format, KRAJ began broadcasting Jones' nationally syndicated Good Time Oldies format. For a few months after KRAJ's format change, the station held over its local specialty shows from the Zone era but later replaced them with syndicated programs that were originally carried by KCEL.

In 2005, KFXM-LP, a low-power FM station in Lancaster, California, signed on with an oldies format. With a significant portion of KRAJ's audience migrating to KFXM-LP, KRAJ dropped oldies in favor of a rhythmic contemporary format called "100.9 The Party Station". Adelman moved Good Time Oldies to KLOA (1240 AM) — a station that cannot be received clearly in the Antelope Valley.

In July 2006, Adelman Broadcasting hired Dan Garite (formerly of KOCP and KCAQ in Oxnard-Ventura, California) as program director and morning drive co-host. Retaining the hip-hop format, KRAJ rebranded as "100-9 The Heat". In mid-2008, the station hired DJCraigEC (Craig Altman) as program director; he adjusted the format to feature more mainstream pop while continuing to emphasize rhythmic content.

On April 27, 2026, KRAJ changed their format from rhythmic contemporary to country, branded as "Thunder Country 100.9". The call sign was changed to KWDJ-FM on May 5, 2026; the KRAJ call sign was moved to KGIL (98.5 FM), which had taken on the rhythmic contemporary format and "Heat" branding.
