= Johannesburg, California =

- Unincorporated Community; Census Designated Place
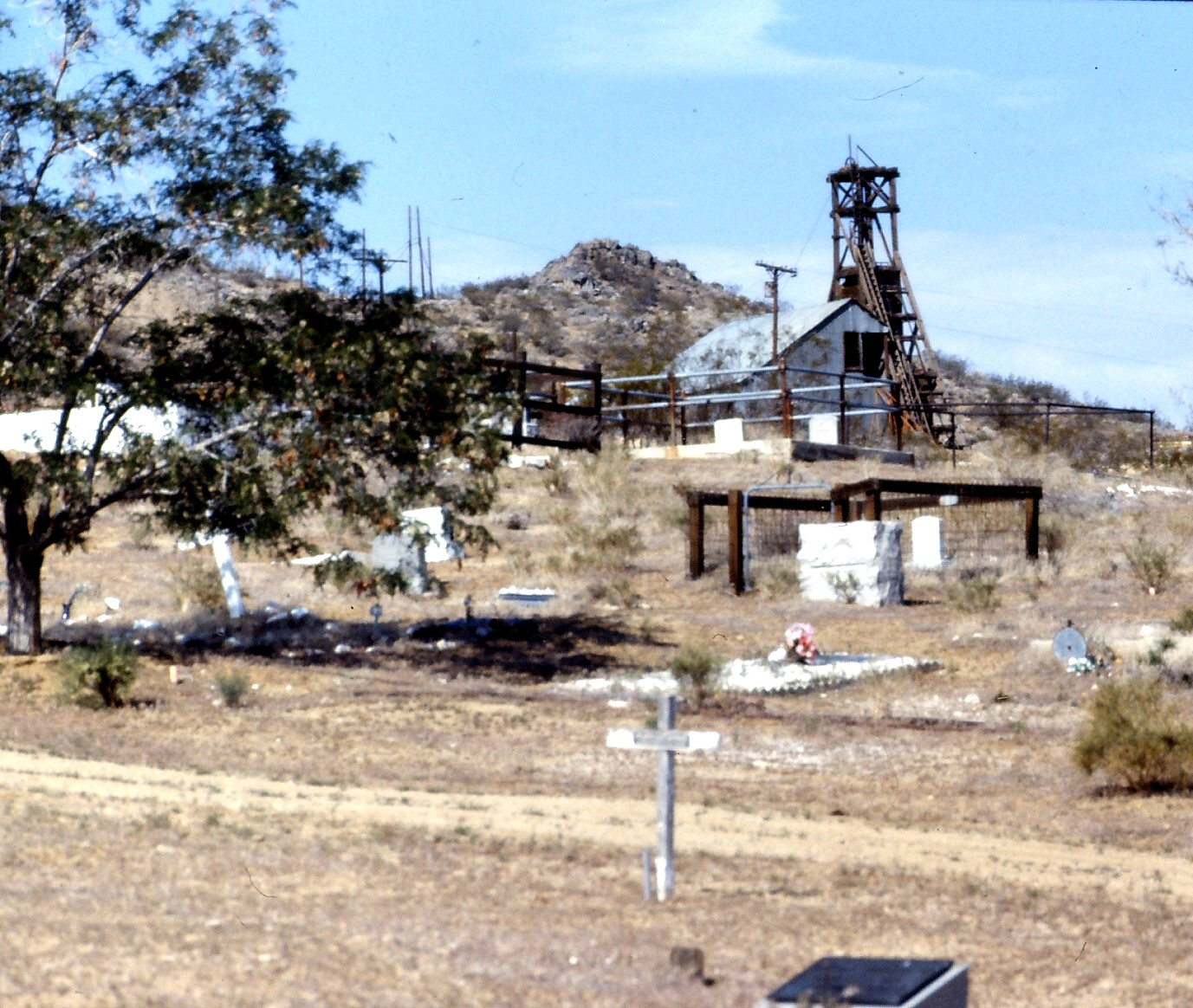
- Rand District Cemetery

- Location in Kern County and California

- Location in the United States
- Coordinates: 35°22′22″N 117°38′05″W
- Country: United States
- State: California
- County: Kern

Government
  - State senator: Shannon Grove (R)
  - Assemblymember: Tom Lackey (R)
  - U.S. rep.: Jay Obernolte (R)

Area
  - Total: 2.453 sq mi (6.354 km^{2})
  - Land: 2.453 sq mi (6.354 km^{2})
  - Water: 0 sq mi (0 km^{2}) 0%
- Elevation: 3,517 ft (1,072 m)

Population (2020)
  - Total: 113
  - Density: 46.1/sq mi (17.8/km^{2})
- Time zone: UTC-8 (PST)
  - Summer (DST): UTC-7 (PDT)
- ZIP codes: 93528, 93554
- Area codes: 442/760
- FIPS code: 06-37400
- GNIS feature ID: 0244074

Johannesburg is a census-designated place (CDP) in Kern County, California, United States, in a mining district of the Rand Mountains. Johannesburg is located 1 mile (1.6 km) east-northeast of Randsburg, at an elevation of 3,517 feet (1,072 m). The terminus of the Randsburg Railway was located here from 1897 to 1933. The population was 113 at the 2020 census, down from 172 at the 2010 census. Johannesburg is divided from the neighboring community of Randsburg by a ridge. The town is frequently referred to as "Joburg" by locals and frequent visitors to the northwestern Mojave Desert.

== History ==
Johannesburg was founded to support mining operations at Randsburg. In addition to providing rail access, the region's first wells were operated by companies located in Johannesburg. During the first half of the 20th century, the Rand Mining District was the principal gold producing region of California. Activity centered on the Yellow Aster Mine, discovered in 1894. In 1919, the Rand Silver Mine was discovered east of town on Red Mountain. The Rand Mine produced more silver than any mine in California.

Johannesburg was named by miners who had previously worked in the gold-producing region of South Africa. Containing the city of Johannesburg, South Africa, this region is in the Witwatersrand, and is frequently referred to as "the Rand."

The first post office at Johannesburg opened in 1897.

In 1993 Grunge band Alice in Chains used the town as a filming location for their song Down in A Hole.

== Transportation ==
Transportation to Johannesburg is provided by Ridgecrest Transit as a lifeline service once a week.

== Geography ==
Johannesburg is located at 35°22′22″N 117°38′05″W.

According to the United States Census Bureau, the CDP has a total area of 2.5 square miles (6.4 km^{2}), all land.

== Demographics ==
Historical population
Census	Pop.	Note	%±
2000	176		—
2010	172		−2.3%
2020	113		−34.3%
U.S. Decennial Census; 1860–1870 1880-1890; 1900 1910 1920; 1930 1940 1950; 1960 1970 1980; 1990 2000 2010; 2020

Johannesburg first appeared as a census designated place in the 2000 U.S. census.

=== 2020 ===
Johannesburg CDP, California – Racial and ethnic composition Note: the US Census treats Hispanic/Latino as an ethnic category. This table excludes Latinos from the racial categories and assigns them to a separate category. Hispanics/Latinos may be of any race.
Race / Ethnicity (NH = Non-Hispanic)	Pop 2000	Pop 2010	Pop 2020	% 2000	% 2010	% 2020
White alone (NH)	157	146	89	89.20%	84.88%	78.76%
Black or African American alone (NH)	0	2	0	0.00%	1.16%	0.00%
Native American or Alaska Native alone (NH)	2	2	0	1.14%	1.16%	0.00%
Asian alone (NH)	0	8	8	0.00%	4.65%	7.08%
Native Hawaiian or Pacific Islander alone (NH)	0	0	0	0.00%	0.00%	0.00%
Other race alone (NH)	0	0	0	0.00%	0.00%	0.00%
Mixed race or Multiracial (NH)	7	6	9	3.98%	3.49%	7.96%
Hispanic or Latino (any race)	10	8	7	5.68%	4.65%	6.19%
Total	176	172	113	100.00%	100.00%	100.00%

The 2020 United States census reported that Johannesburg had a population of 113. The population density was 46.1 inhabitants per square mile (17.8/km^{2}). The racial makeup of Johannesburg was 91 (80.5%) White, 1 (0.9%) African American, 0 (0.0%) Native American, 8 (7.1%) Asian, 0 (0.0%) Pacific Islander, 1 (0.9%) from other races, and 12 (10.6%) from two or more races. Hispanic or Latino of any race were 7 persons (6.2%).

There were 61 households, out of which 11 (18.0%) had children under the age of 18 living in them, 18 (29.5%) were married-couple households, 6 (9.8%) were cohabiting couple households, 15 (24.6%) had a female householder with no partner present, and 22 (36.1%) had a male householder with no partner present. 26 households (42.6%) were one person, and 12 (19.7%) were one person aged 65 or older. The average household size was 1.85. There were 29 families (47.5% of all households).

The age distribution was 9 people (8.0%) under the age of 18, 2 people (1.8%) aged 18 to 24, 10 people (8.8%) aged 25 to 44, 51 people (45.1%) aged 45 to 64, and 41 people (36.3%) who were 65 years of age or older. The median age was 60.7 years. There were 61 males and 52 females.

There were 109 housing units at an average density of 44.4 units per square mile (17.1 units/km^{2}), of which 61 (56.0%) were occupied. Of these, 50 (82.0%) were owner-occupied, and 11 (18.0%) were occupied by renters.

=== 2010 ===
At the 2010 census Johannesburg had a population of 172. The population density was 71.2 inhabitants per square mile (27.5/km^{2}). The racial makeup of Johannesburg was 152 (88.4%) White, 2 (1.2%) African American, 2 (1.2%) Native American, 8 (4.7%) Asian, 0 (0.0%) Pacific Islander, 0 (0.0%) from other races, and 8 (4.7%) from two or more races. Hispanic or Latino of any race were 8 people (4.7%).

The whole population lived in households, no one lived in non-institutionalized group quarters and no one was institutionalized.

There were 95 households, 10 (10.5%) had children under the age of 18 living in them, 32 (33.7%) were opposite-sex married couples living together, 2 (2.1%) had a female householder with no husband present, 3 (3.2%) had a male householder with no wife present. There were 7 (7.4%) unmarried opposite-sex partnerships, and 1 (1.1%) same-sex married couples or partnerships. 47 households (49.5%) were one person and 21 (22.1%) had someone living alone who was 65 or older. The average household size was 1.81. There were 37 families (38.9% of households); the average family size was 2.76.

The age distribution was 21 people (12.2%) under the age of 18, 4 people (2.3%) aged 18 to 24, 26 people (15.1%) aged 25 to 44, 75 people (43.6%) aged 45 to 64, and 46 people (26.7%) who were 65 or older. The median age was 55.0 years. For every 100 females, there were 109.8 males. For every 100 females age 18 and over, there were 109.7 males.

There were 139 housing units at an average density of 57.6 per square mile, of the occupied units 73 (76.8%) were owner-occupied and 22 (23.2%) were rented. The homeowner vacancy rate was 2.7%; the rental vacancy rate was 14.8%. 137 people (79.7% of the population) lived in owner-occupied housing units and 35 people (20.3%) lived in rental housing units.
