= Burro Schmidt Tunnel =

Registered Historic Place in Kern, California

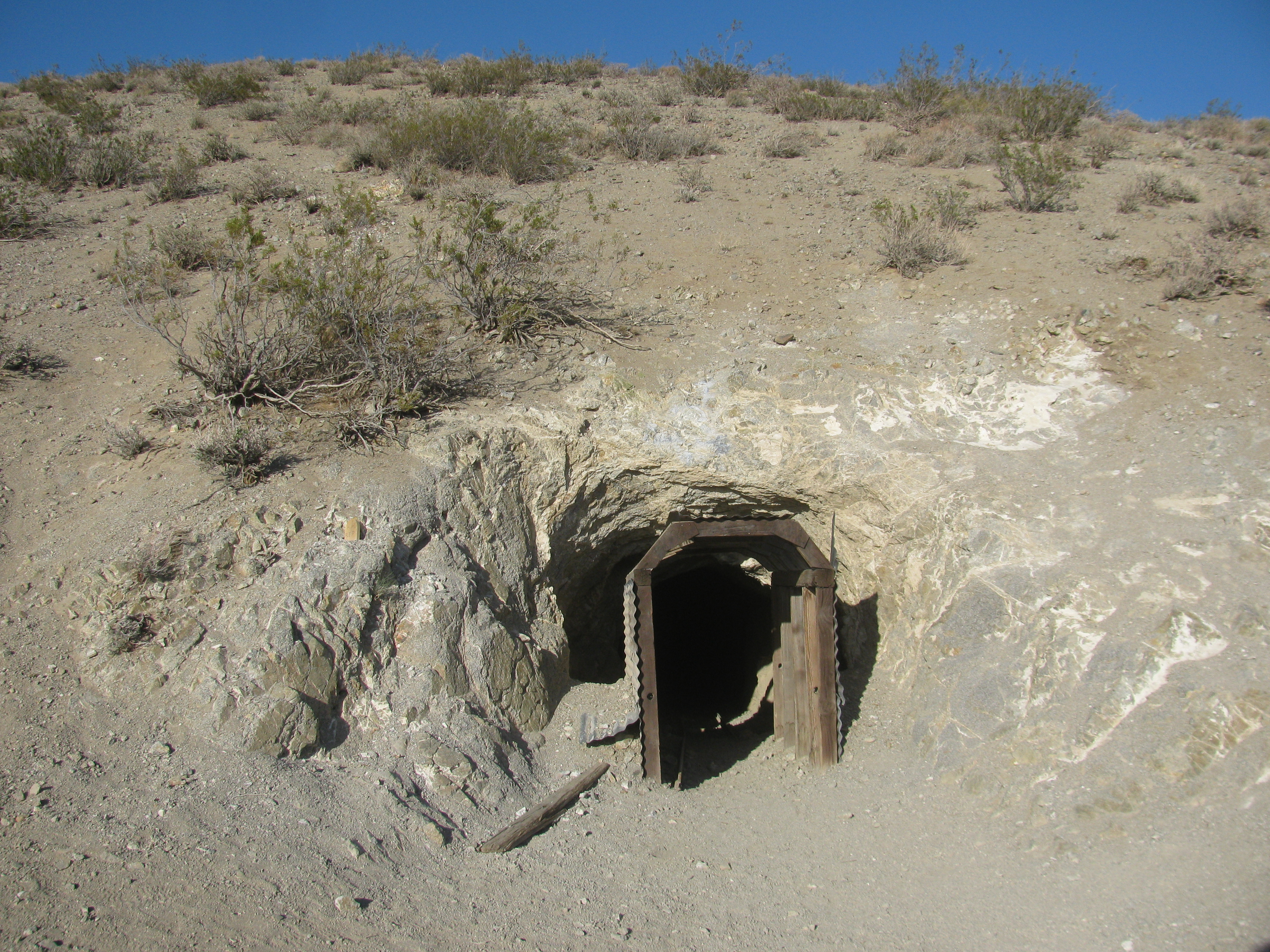
- South entrance to the tunnel
- Interactive map of Burro Schmidt Tunnel

Overview
- Location: Kern County, California
- Coordinates: 35°24.62′N 117°52.55′W
- Start: 1906
- End: 1938

Technical
- Length: 0.5 mi (0.8 km)
- Grade
- Burro Schmidt's Tunnel
- U.S. National Register of Historic Places
- Location within California Location within the United States
- Nearest city: Ridgecrest, California
- Area: 11.5 acres (4.7 ha)
- Built: 1906–1938
- Engineer: Schmidt, William Henry (Father)
- Architectural style: Earthen tunnel
- NRHP reference No.: 03000113
- Added to NRHP: March 20, 2003

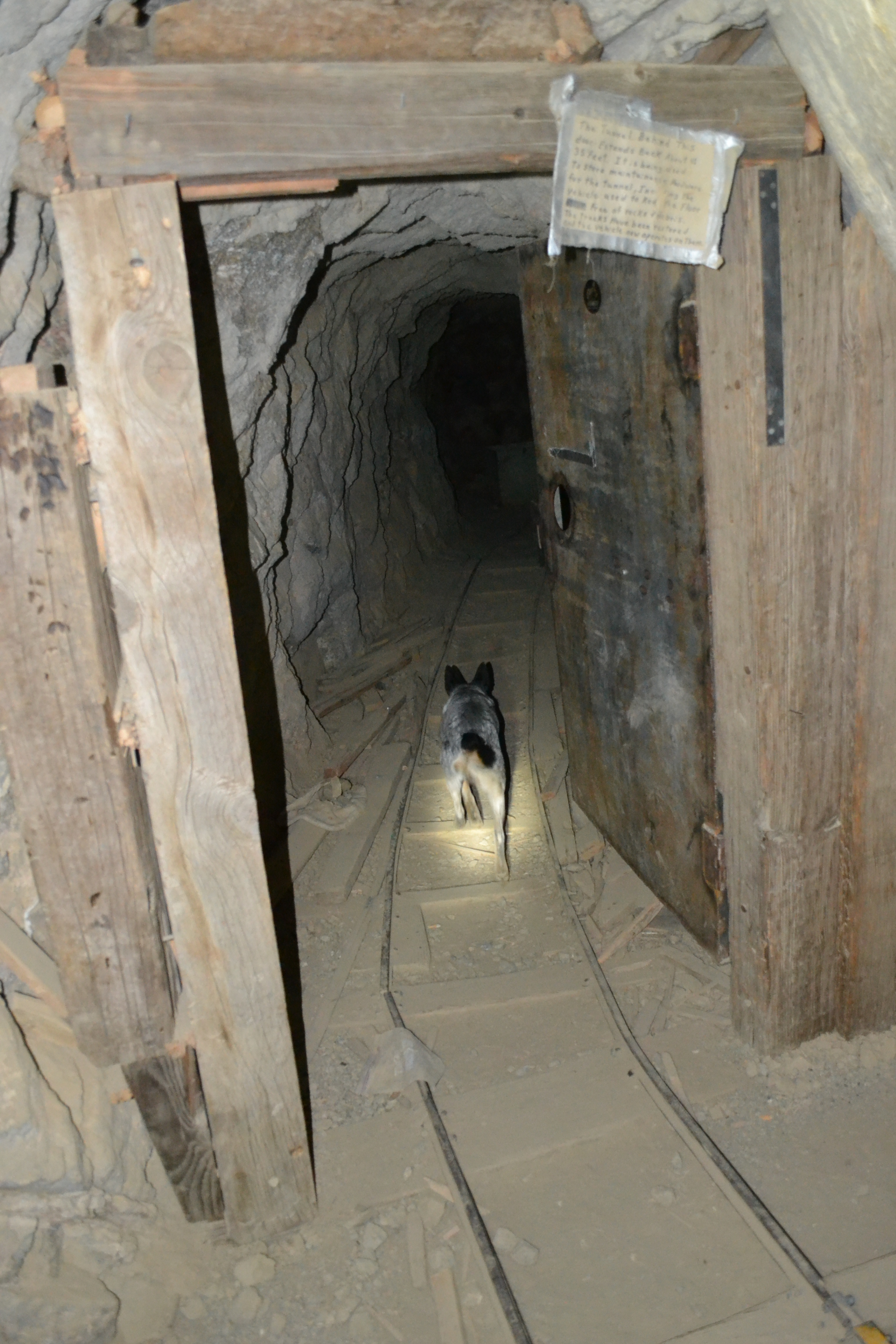
Inside the tunnel

The historical Burro Schmidt Tunnel is located in the El Paso Mountains of the northern Mojave Desert, in eastern Kern County, southern California.

It is a 0.5-mile (0.80 km) mining tunnel dug with hand tools and dynamite over a 38-year period by William "Burro" H. Schmidt (1871–1954). in the El Paso Mountains of eastern California.

The tunnel is below the summit of a 4,400-foot (1,300 m) mountain. Its southern adit (portal) overlooks the Fremont Valley, Koehn Dry Lake, and the ghost towns of Garlock and Saltdale.

== History ==
While mining gold in the El Paso Mountains, “Burro” Schmidt was faced with a dangerous ridge between his mining claims and the smelter to the south in Mojave. Schmidt said that he would "never haul his ore to the Mojave smelter down that back trail" using his two burros. Thus, he began his tunnel in 1906. The tunnel was about 6 feet (1.8 m) tall and 10 feet (3.0 m) wide. It was cut through solid granite bedrock and required little shoring. However, Schmidt was trapped many times by falling rock and injured often. He eventually installed a mining cart on rails.

In 1920 a road was completed from Last Chance Canyon to Mojave. This eliminated Schmidt's need for the tunnel, but he continued to dig anyway.

By 1938 he had achieved his "goal", having dug through nearly 2,500 feet (760 m) of solid granite using only a pick, a shovel, and a four-pound hammer for the initial section, and carefully placed dynamite with notoriously short fuses for the majority portion. It was estimated that he had moved 5,800 tons (5,260 metric tonnes) of rock with just a wheelbarrow to complete his work.

Schmidt never used the tunnel to move his mine's ore. Instead, he sold the tunnel to another miner and moved away. A Ripley's Believe It or Not! cartoon celebrated the feat, calling him the human mole.

Schmidt's cabin stands as it was in the 1930s, preserved by the dry climate.

== Ownership dispute ==
Ownership of land underlying a mining claim remains with the United States government, under the management of the Bureau of Land Management (BLM), with only mining rights transferred to the mining claim owner. Whereas no mining operations are underway, the BLM states that they own the Schmidt Tunnel and associated surrounding land, because it is an unpatented mining claim under the General Mining Act of 1872, meaning that all rights reverted to the BLM under the Federal Land Policy and Management Act of 1976 upon the death of the grandfathered claimant, Evelyn A. (Tonie) Seger, who had possessed the claim prior to 1976.

This is in dispute, as Seger is claimed by heirs to have maintained the claim legally under the terms of the Mining Act and properly transferred the mining claim upon her death to David Ayers, her caretaker for the last years of her life. As of 2003 David Ayers and Mr. F. Schmidt claimed to be legal owners of the mining claim containing the Schmidt Tunnel.

The historical buildings on the mining claim site were transferred by Tonie Seger's will to her granddaughter, Cheryl Kelly. The BLM assumed ownership of the buildings via publication of an abandonment notice, after multiple attempts to contact then-owner Cheryl Kelly by both BLM personnel and private parties (in order to preserve the site) failed. According to the BLM, long-time caretaker David Ayers was offered the opportunity to sign a Memorandum of Understanding (MOU) with the BLM to be the full-time caretaker of the site, but refused to sign unless he was paid to be the caretaker and instead chose to leave to work elsewhere after being informed he had no legal right to remain at the site without the MOU.

== Preservation ==
A small group of history buffs and outdoorspeople, The Friends of Last Canyon, are actively preserving the site, but ongoing disputes about ownership of the mining claim and historic structures continue to interfere with preservation efforts. As a result, Schmidt's cabin has fallen prey to vandalism.

== Media ==
The second half of Episode #509 of California's Gold with Huell Howser, which was first aired in September 1994, is devoted to the Burro Schmidt Tunnel. (See external links, below.) Roadkill aired an episode with David Freiburger and Steve Dulcich in which they walk through the tunnel and give its history.

== See also ==
- El Paso Mountains
- El Paso Mountains Wilderness Area
- Forestiere Underground Gardens
- National Register of Historic Places listings in Kern County, California
- Jawbone Canyon
- Red Rock Canyon State Park (California)
