= Koehn Lake =

Lake in the state of California, United States

- Location within California Location within the United States
- Location: Mojave Desert; Kern County, California
- Coordinates: 35.338°N 117.865°W
- Lake type: Endorheic basin
- Primary outflows: Terminal
- Basin countries: United States
- Max. length: 5 miles (8.0 km)
- Max. width: 3 miles (4.8 km)
- Shore length^{1}: 30 km (19 mi)
- Surface elevation: 579 m (1,900 ft)
- References: U.S. Geological Survey Geographic Names Information System: Koehn Lake
- ^{1} Shore length is not a well-defined measure.

Koehn Lake is a dry lake, and seasonally endorheic lake, in the Fremont Valley of the Mojave Desert, in eastern Kern County, California.

== Geography ==
The valley is 19 km (12 mi) northeast of California City, and east of Red Rock Canyon State Park.

The lake is approximately 5 miles (8.0 km) long and 3 miles (4.8 km) at its widest point.

The nearby ghost town of Saltdale was founded in 1915, for salt harvesting from the dry lakebed. The ghost town of Garlock is on the north. The southern portal of Burro Schmidt Tunnel overlooks the dry lake and Fremont Valley.

== See also ==
- Salt flats of California
- List of lakes in California
