= El Paso Mountains =

- Location within California

Highest point
- Elevation: 1,479 m (4,852 ft)

Geography
- Country: United States
- State: California
- Region: Mojave Desert
- District: Kern County
- Range coordinates: 35°26′15.854″N 117°48′57.235″W
- Topo map: USGS Garlock

The El Paso Mountains are located in the northern Mojave Desert, in central Southern California in the Western United States.

== Geography ==
The range lies in a southwest-northeasterly direction east of State Route 14, and north of the Rand Mountains and Randsburg Red Rock Road. Red Rock Canyon State Park lies at the western end of the range.

The mountain range is approximately 18 miles (29 km) long. It is 16 mi (26 km) north−northeast of California City, and south of Ridgecrest and Inyokern. Highway 395 crosses the range near Johannesburg.

Black Mountain is the highest point of the range at 5,244 feet (1,598 m).

== Features ==
The El Paso Mountains Wilderness Area is within the range, managed by the BLM−Bureau of Land Management. The Last Chance Archaeological District, within the wilderness area, is listed on the National Register of Historic Places listings in Kern County, California.

Vegetation primarily consists of creosote bush (Larrea tridentata) scrub community, with Joshua trees (Yucca brevifolia) on the western side of the range.

The Burro Schmidt Tunnel, a mining ore transport tunnel dug by hand by William "Burro" H. Schmidt between 1906 and 1938, goes through the El Paso Mountains. Its southern portal overlooks the ghost town of Garlock.

== Prehistory ==
The Coso People were early Native American inhabitants of this mountain range. They created extensive carvings in rock within the El Paso and neighboring mountains, and conducted considerable trade with other tribes as distant as the Chumash on the Pacific coast.

== See also ==
- History of the Mojave Desert region
- Natural history of the Mojave Desert
