= Wahweap Formation =

Geologic formation in the United States

- Stratigraphic range: Campanian, 82.2–77.3 Ma
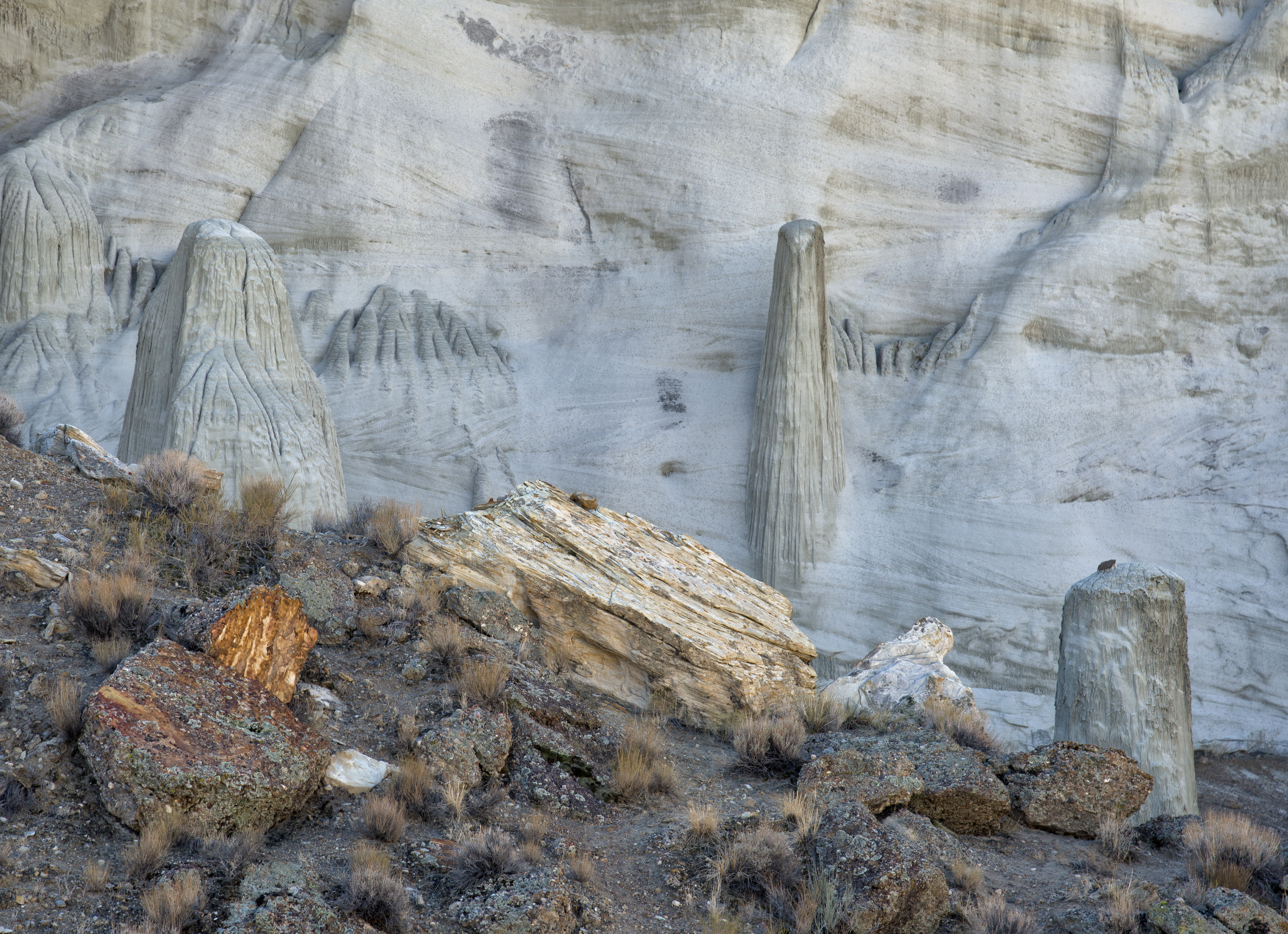
- Wahweap Formation, Grand Staircase–Escalante National Monument, Utah
- Type: Geological formation
- Unit of: Kaiparowits Plateau
- Sub-units: Last Chance Creek Member, Reynolds Point Member, Coyote Point Member, Pardner Canyon Member
- Underlies: Kaiparowits Formation
- Overlies: Straight Cliffs Formation

Lithology
- Primary: sandstone

Location
- Coordinates: 37.5°N 111.7°W
- Region: North America
- Country: United States
- Extent: Southern Utah, Northern Arizona

Type section
- Named for: Wahweap Creek

The Wahweap Formation of the Grand Staircase–Escalante National Monument is a geological formation in southern Utah and northern Arizona, around the Lake Powell region, whose strata date back to the Late Cretaceous (Campanian stage). Dinosaur remains are among the fossils that have been recovered from the formation.

== Age ==
The Wahweap formation is divided into four members, which are listed below with their respective ages:

- Last Chance Creek Member: 82.17-81.55 Ma
- Reynolds Point Member: 81.55-80.61 Ma
- Coyote Point Member: 80.61-79 Ma
- Pardner Canyon Member: 79-77.29 Ma

== Paleobiota ==
=== Invertebrates ===
The Wahweap Formation shows a substantial amount of invertebrate activity ranging from fossilized insect burrows in petrified logs to various mollusks that characterize the shell beds. Large fossilized crabs are common at most shell bed sites in the Wahweap, and over 1,900 gastropod specimens (of four likely genera) have been unearthed in the formation's siltstone.

=== Elasmobranchs ===
Elasmobranchs of the Wahweap Formation
Taxon	Species	Locality	Member	Material	Notes	Images
Cantioscyllium	C. estesi	MNA Locality 705; MNA Locality 455-1; UMNH VP Locality 82		MNA V10230-32, MNA V10384-85, MNA 10390, UMNH VP 18915-16, UMNH VP 18919; teeth	A nurse shark which inhabited freshwater.	Chiloscyllium griseum (grey bamboo shark) Hybodus hauffianus
Chiloscyllium	C. missouriense	UMNH VP Locality 77; MNA Locality 455-1		MNA V10386, UMNH VP 18880, UMNH VP 18882, UMMNH VP 18886, UMNH VP 18887, UMNH VP 18888; teeth	A bamboo shark which inhabited freshwater. One specimen is similar to Restesia americana.	Chiloscyllium griseum (grey bamboo shark) Hybodus hauffianus
Columbusia	C. deblieuxi	UMNH VP Locality 77		UMNH VP 18877, UMNH VP 18879, UMNH VP 18836, UMNH VP 18876, UMNH VP 18878; teeth	A sclerorhynchid ray, closely related to Squatirhina.	Chiloscyllium griseum (grey bamboo shark) Hybodus hauffianus
Cristomylus	C. ciffelli	MNA Locality 456-1; UMNH VP Locality 77; UMNH VP Locality 82		MNA V9531, MNA V9568, MNA V9600, UMNH VP 17393; symphysial teeth; MNA V9502, MNA V9525, MNA V9569, MNA V9633, MNA V9635, MNA V9652, UMNH VP 17393, UMNH VP 17395, UMNH VP 17399, UMNH VP 17404; small teeth; MNA V9593, MNA V9683, MNA V9686, UMNH VP 17401; large teeth	A small guitarfish, suited for handling hard-shelled prey.	Chiloscyllium griseum (grey bamboo shark) Hybodus hauffianus
Hybodus?	H. sp	MNA Locality 456-2		MNA V10387; Tooth	A large hybodont shark reaching over 2 m (6.6 ft) in length. Normally a marine species but would enter freshwater environments	Chiloscyllium griseum (grey bamboo shark) Hybodus hauffianus
Lonchidion	L. sp.	UMNH VP Locality 82		UMNH VP 18917; Tooth	Smaller than Lonchidon selachos.	Chiloscyllium griseum (grey bamboo shark) Hybodus hauffianus
Texatrygon	T. brycensis	UMNH VP Locality 77; UMNH VP Locality 82		UMNH VP 18882-83; Rostral teeth; UMNH VP 18836, UMNH VP 18885, UMNH VP 18889-94, UMNH VP 18920; Oral teeth; UMNH VP 18918; denticle	A sawfish.	Chiloscyllium griseum (grey bamboo shark) Hybodus hauffianus

=== Osteichthyes ===
Osteichthyes of the Wahweap Formation
Taxon	Genus	Locality	Member	Material	Notes	Images
Lepidotes	Indeterminate			Teeth	A seminotiform fish, no extant relatives live today.	Albula vulpes (Bonefish)
Micropycnodon	M. sp.	MNA Locality 706-2		MNA V10336; pharyngeal tooth	A pycnodontiform fish, adapted to crush its prey.	Albula vulpes (Bonefish)
Paralbula	P. sp.			Teeth	A bonefish which is adapted to eating hard-shelled prey.	Albula vulpes (Bonefish)
Polyodontidae	Indeterminate	MNA Locality 456-2		MNA 10356; denticle	A paddlefish, very rare in the Wahweap Formation.	Albula vulpes (Bonefish)

=== Salamanders ===
Lissamphibians of the Wahweap Formation
Taxon	Species	Locality	Member	Material	Notes	Images
Gen. nov.	sp. nov.	UMNH VP Locality 77		UMNH VP 19209; trunk vertebra	Higher level relationships are uncertain. Similar to sirenids, but lacks sirenid synapomorphies.	
Opisthotriton	O. sp.	UMNH VP Locality 130		UMNH VP 19194-19198; atlantes; UMNH VP 19199-19200; trunk vertebrae	A batrachosauroidid, a family of extinct aquatic salamanders.	
Scapherpeton	S. sp.	UMNH VP Locality 77		UMNH VP 19186; atlas	A scapherpetontid.	

=== Dinosaurs ===
Dinosaurs known from the Wahweap include at least 2 species of hadrosaur, at least two ceratopsians and at least one theropod.

Dinosaurs of the Wahweap Formation
Taxon	Species	Locality	Member	Material	Notes	Images
Acristavus	A. gagslarsoni	"near the junction of Smokey Mountain Road and Right Hand Collet Canyon"	Upper part of Reynolds Point Member	UMNH VP 16607; "a partial articulated skull roof including lacrimals and entire braincase, and a single cervical vertebra"	A hadrosaurid closely related to Brachylophosaurus and Maiasaura. Also known from the Two Medicine Formation.	Acristavus Adelolophus Brachylophosaurus Diabloceratops Lythronax Machairoceratops
Adelolophus	A. hutchisoni	UCMP V98173	Lower part of Coyote Point Member	UCMP 152028; partial maxilla	A lambeosaurine hadrosaurid, possibly a parasaurolophin.	Acristavus Adelolophus Brachylophosaurus Diabloceratops Lythronax Machairoceratops
Ankylosauridae	Indeterminate		Coyote Point Member	OMNH 21280 (in part), OMNH 21858, OMNH 24276; Teeth		Acristavus Adelolophus Brachylophosaurus Diabloceratops Lythronax Machairoceratops
Brachylophosaurus	Indeterminate	Death Ridge	Upper part of Coyote Point Member	UMNH VP 9548; "Partial limb bones and a partial maxilla"	Different from Acristavus.	Acristavus Adelolophus Brachylophosaurus Diabloceratops Lythronax Machairoceratops
Centrosaurinae	Indeterminate	Nipple Butte	Upper part of Last Chance Creek Member	UMNH VP 16704; Partial skull	Originally referred to Diabloceratops, but is more derived, possibly a nasutoceratopsin.	Acristavus Adelolophus Brachylophosaurus Diabloceratops Lythronax Machairoceratops
Centrosaurinae	Indeterminate	Pilot Knoll	Upper part of Last Chance Creek Member	UMNH VP 20600; "A partial braincase and a nearly complete parietosquamosal frill"	Also known as "Wahweap Centrosaurine A." Similar to Albertaceratops.	Acristavus Adelolophus Brachylophosaurus Diabloceratops Lythronax Machairoceratops
Centrosaurinae	Indeterminate	Death Ridge	Upper part of Coyote Point Member	UMNH VP 9549; "Partial frill and some postcranial elements"	Also known as "Wahweap Centrosaurine C." Possibly has spikes similar to Styracosaurus.	Acristavus Adelolophus Brachylophosaurus Diabloceratops Lythronax Machairoceratops
Diabloceratops	D. eatoni	42Ka800V, south side of Last Chance Canyon	Middle part of Reynolds Point Member	UMNH VP 166999; "a skull preserving the entire left side of the skull and portions of the right side"	The older specimen from Nipple Butte may not belong to Diabloceratops.	Acristavus Adelolophus Brachylophosaurus Diabloceratops Lythronax Machairoceratops
Lythronax	L. argestes	UMNH VP Locality 1501	Lower part of Reynolds Point Member	UMNH VP 20200; partial skeleton	A tyrannosaurine	Acristavus Adelolophus Brachylophosaurus Diabloceratops Lythronax Machairoceratops
Machairoceratops	M. cronusi	Star Seep	Coyote Point Member	UMNH VP 20550; partial skull	A centrosaurine closely related to Diabloceratops. Previously known as "Wahweap Centrosaurine B."	Acristavus Adelolophus Brachylophosaurus Diabloceratops Lythronax Machairoceratops
Nodosauridae	Indeterminate		Last Chance Creek Member?; Reynolds Point Member; Coyote Point Member	OMNH 21280 (in part), OMNH 21992, OMNH 24278; Teeth; UMNH VP 13981, UMNH VP 15664, UMNH VP 16408, UMNH VP 21207; osteoderms; a cranium (lost); a partial skeleton	The skeleton was under excavation as of 2013. The cranium was only tentatively identified as a nodosaurid, but now can't be confirmed.	Acristavus Adelolophus Brachylophosaurus Diabloceratops Lythronax Machairoceratops
Pachycephalosauridae	Indeterminate	Clints Cove	Lower part of Reynolds Point Member	UMNH VP 11939; incomplete frontoparietal dome; some isolated teeth	The dome doesn't preserve diagnostic features, so its affinity with other pachycephalosaurids is uncertain.	Acristavus Adelolophus Brachylophosaurus Diabloceratops Lythronax Machairoceratops
Saurolophinae	Indeterminate		Reynolds Point Member	UMNH VP 21087; partial juvenile skeleton; UMNH VP 13881; partial adult skeleton	Probably represents a new distinct taxon.	Acristavus Adelolophus Brachylophosaurus Diabloceratops Lythronax Machairoceratops

=== Mammals ===
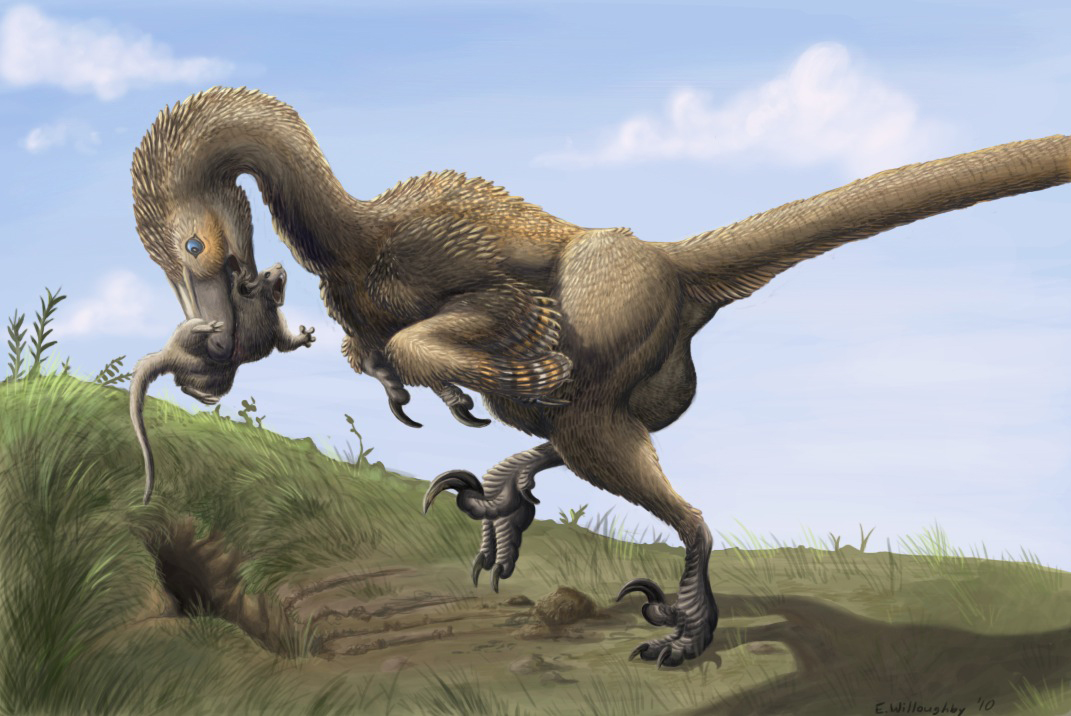
A maniraptoran dinosaur digging a primitive mammal out of its burrow, as per the 2010 discovery by Simpson et al. of trace fossils indicating a predator–prey relationship in the Wahweap Formation.

A fair number of mammals spanning the lower Campanian are known from the Wahweap as well, including at least 15 genera of multituberculates, cladotherians, marsupials, and placental insectivores.

== Trace fossils ==
Trace fossils are also relatively abundant in the Wahweap, and include vertebrate tracks as well as burrow activity. Tracks preserved in the capping sandstone indicate the presence of crocodylomorphs, which had been previously known in this area only from teeth elements, as well as ornithischian dinosaurs. At least one possible theropod track has been identified in this area as well.

In 2010 a unique trace fossil from the Wahweap was discovered that indicates a predator–prey relationship between dinosaurs and primitive mammals. The trace fossil includes at least two fossilized mammalian den complexes as well as associated digging grooves presumably caused by a maniraptoran dinosaur. The proximity indicates a case of probable active predation of the burrow inhabitants by the owners of the claw marks.

== See also ==
- List of dinosaur-bearing rock formations
