= Cantil, California =

Unincorporated community in California, United States

Cantil
- Unincorporated community
- Location in California Cantil (the United States)
- Coordinates: 35°18′32″N 117°58′06″W
- Country: United States
- State: California
- County: Kern
- Elevation: 2,018 ft (615 m)

Cantil (Spanish for "Stone Cliff") is an unincorporated community in Kern County, California, United States. It is in the Fremont Valley of the western Mojave Desert.

== Geography ==
Cantil is located on California State Route 14, between Mojave and Red Rock Canyon. It is at an elevation of 2,018 feet (615 m), 6 miles (9.7 km) southwest of Saltdale.

Its zip code is 93519, and it is served by area codes 442 and 760.

The Red Rock Elementary School and Red Rock Community Day School are in Cantil. Both help students who were not successful in the regular school system.

== History ==
Cantil was founded as a station on the Nevada and California Railroad in 1908 or 1909 when the line was extended from Owens Lake to Mojave. The name is Spanish for "stone cliff" or "steep rock", and is one of a series of "C" names chosen for this section of the line including Cambio, Cinco, and Ceneda. The first post office opened in 1916.

Cantil is near the home of the Honda Proving Center of California (HPCC), a test track used for testing new car models and motorcycles. Honda closed the test facility in April 2010 and put it up for sale; on December 8, 2015, the company announced that they would renovate and expand the HPCC, with some new vehicle test road enhancements and reopen the facility in April 2016.

On October 31, 2014, the Virgin Galactic SpaceShipTwo VSS Enterprise crashed in the Mojave Desert near Cantil, killing one of the two pilots.

== Climate ==
According to the Köppen Climate Classification system, Cantil has a cold desert climate, abbreviated "BWk" on climate maps. Average rainfall is just 4.73 inches (12.01 cm). The highest temperature ever recorded in Cantil was 119 °F (48.3 °C) in 1972. The lowest temperature on record was 1 °F (−17 °C), recorded in 1963. The average daily high for January is 60 °F (15.6 °C), with average lows of 31 °F (−0.6 °C). High temperatures average 103 °F (39.4 °C) in July with average lows of 66 °F (18.9 °C).
