= Last Chance Canyon =

Archaeological site in California, United States

- U.S. National Register of Historic Places
- U.S. Historic district
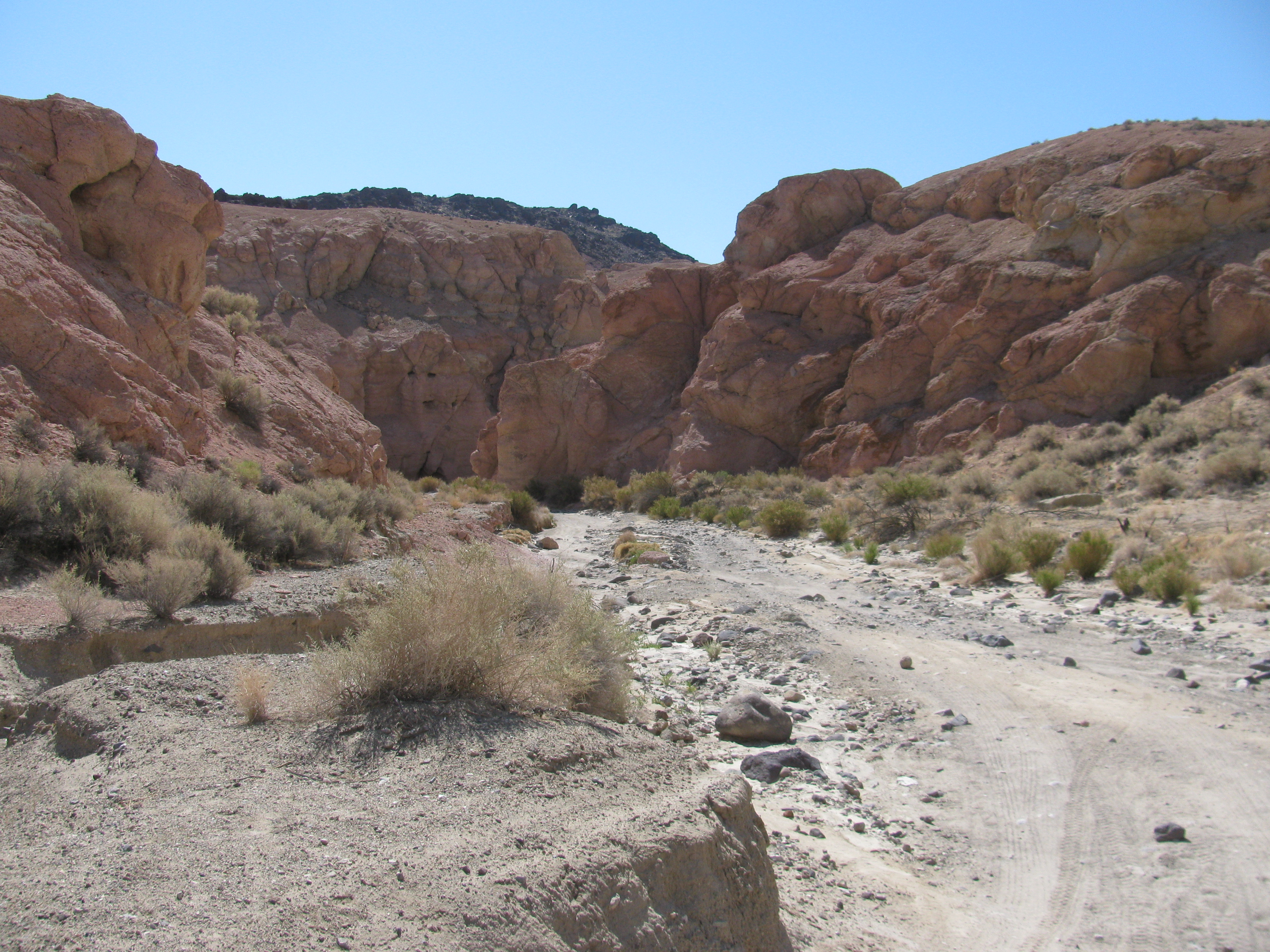
- The canyon near Cudahy Camp

- Location within California Location within the United States
- Nearest city: Johannesburg, California
- Coordinates: 35°22′6″N 117°54′28″W
- Area: 70,528 acres (28,542 ha)
- NRHP reference No.: 72000225
- Added to NRHP: December 5, 1972

Last Chance Canyon is a canyon in the El Paso Mountains near Johannesburg, California. The canyon runs from Saltdale in the south to Black Mountain in the north; part of it lies within Red Rock Canyon State Park. The canyon includes a variety of archaeological sites, including pictographs, villages, rock shelters, mills, and quarries. Historic sites such as gold mining camps are also located in the canyon.

The canyon is owned by the U.S. Bureau of Land Management and is open for recreational use. Hiking, camping, and 4-wheel drive vehicles are permitted in most parts of the canyon.

The canyon was added to the National Register of Historic Places on December 5, 1972.

== Gallery ==
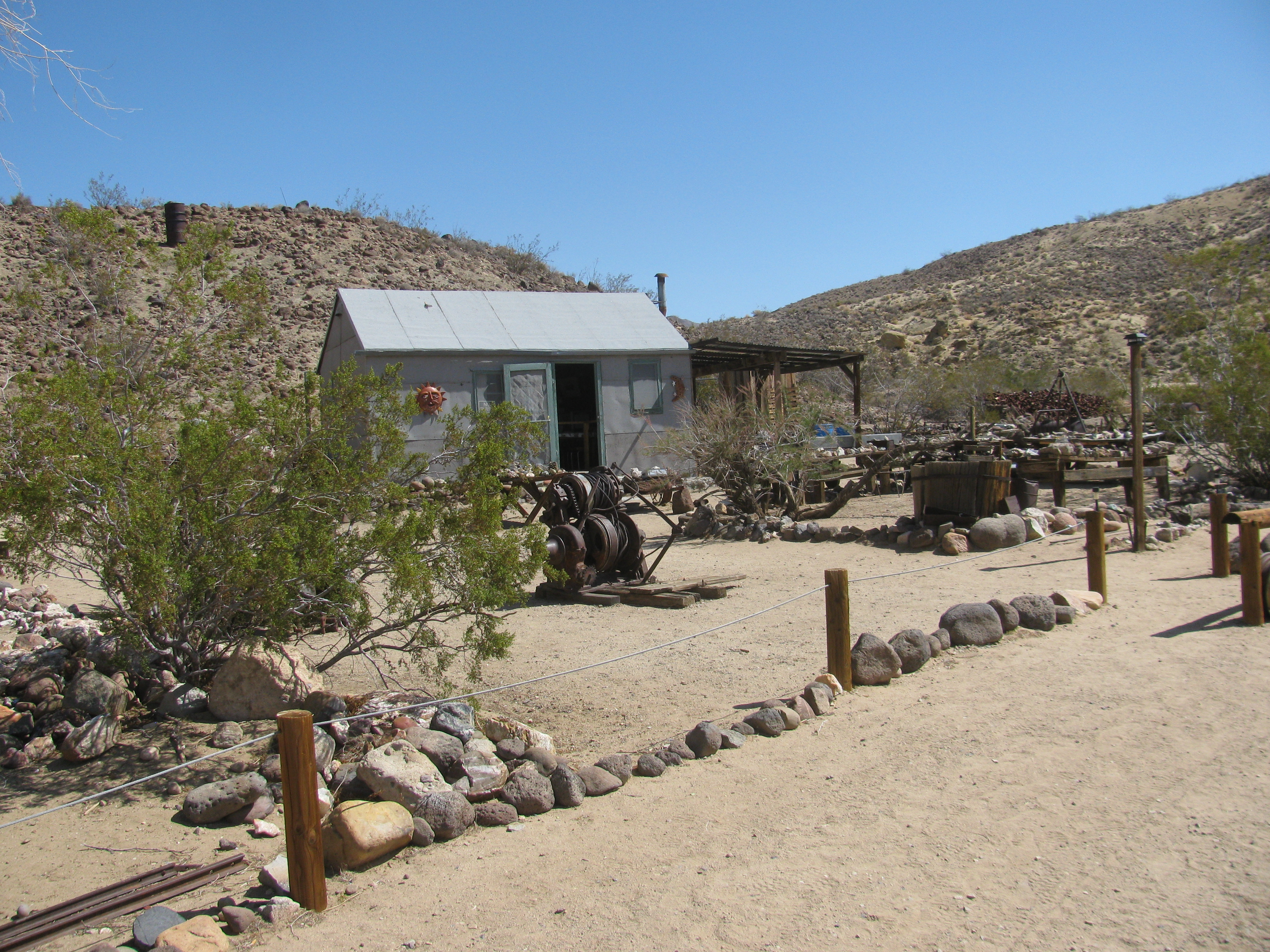
Cabin at Bickel Camp

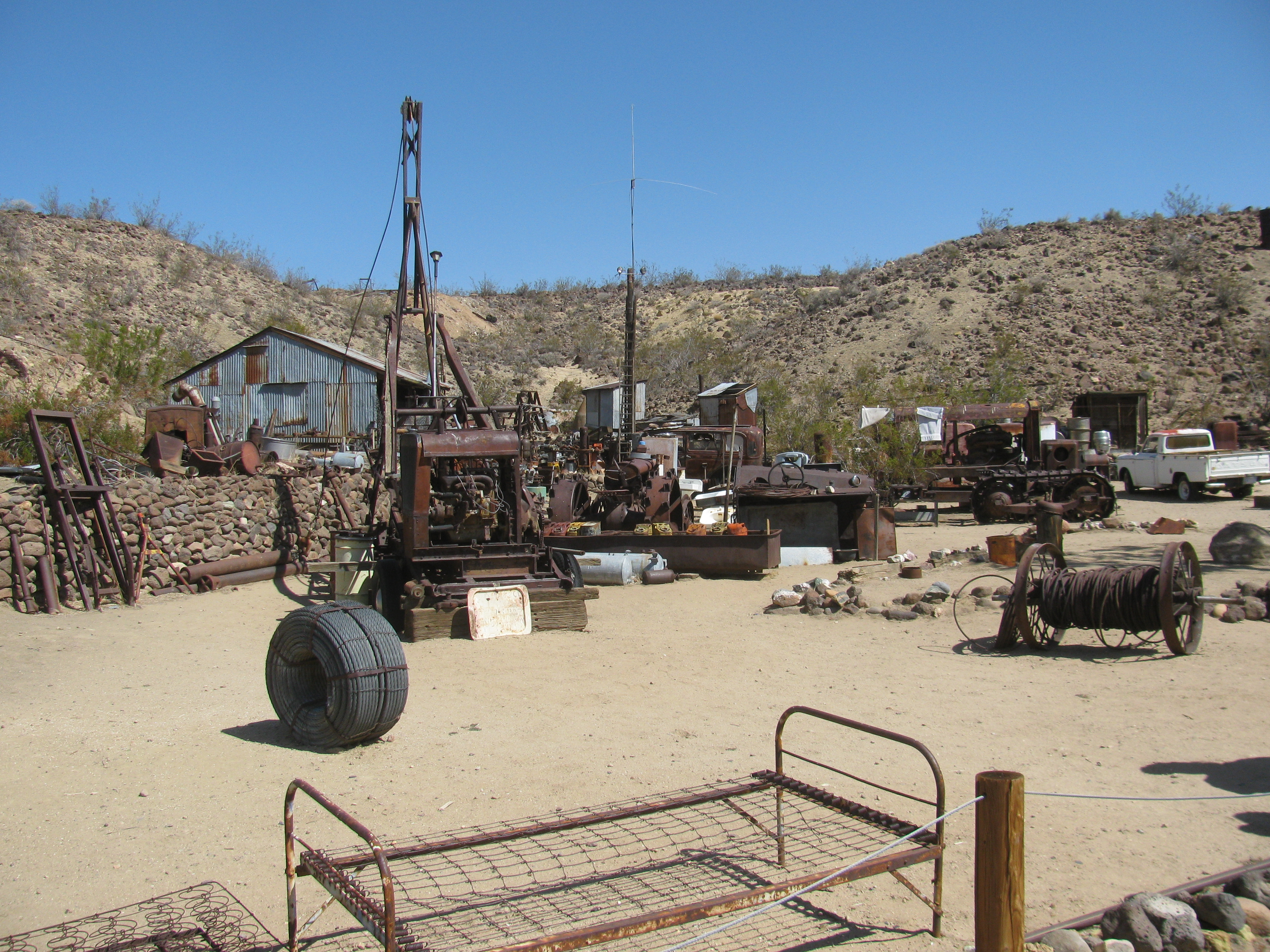
Workshop at Bickel Camp

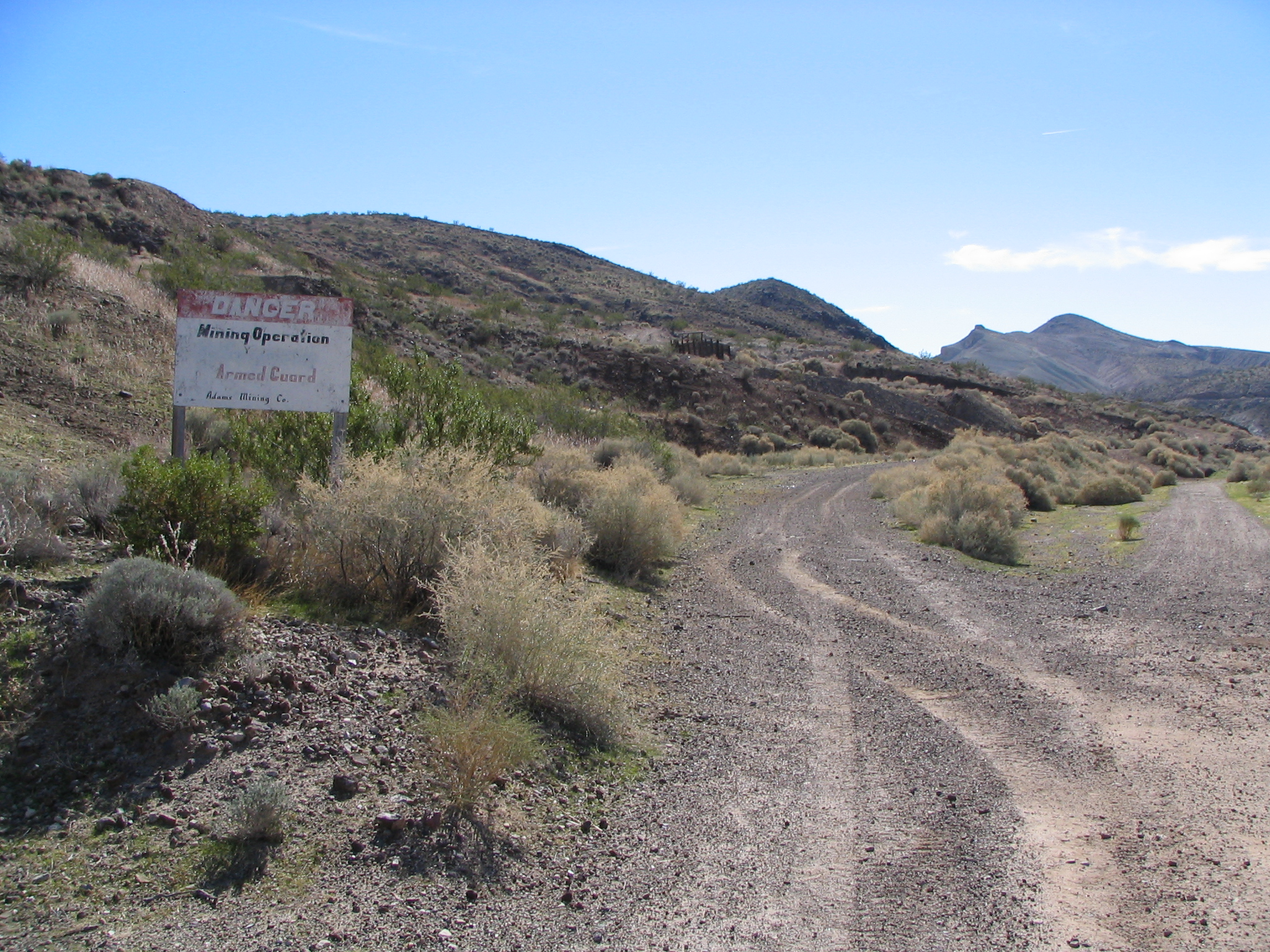
Otto Adams' gold mining claim

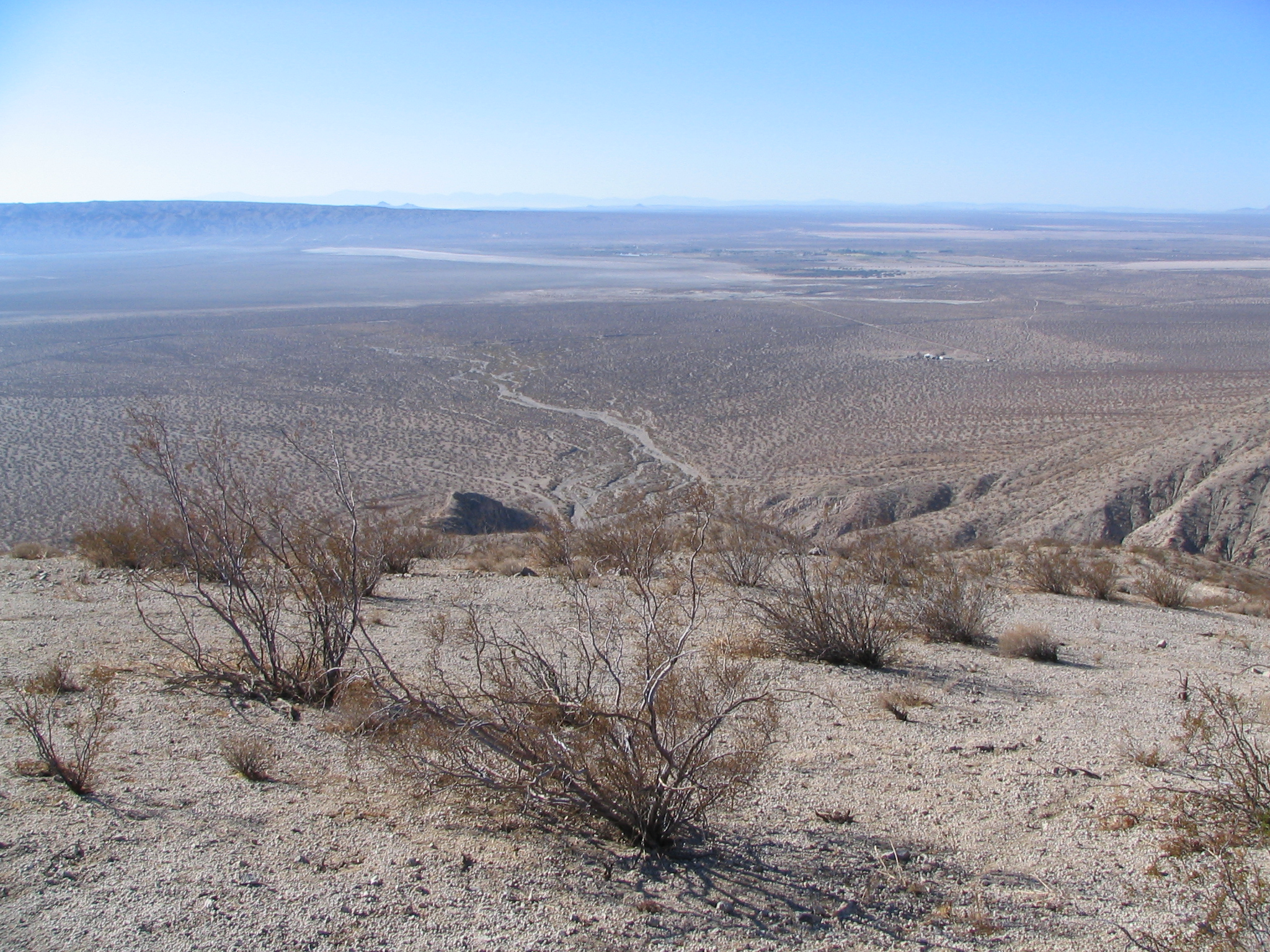
South end of the canyon

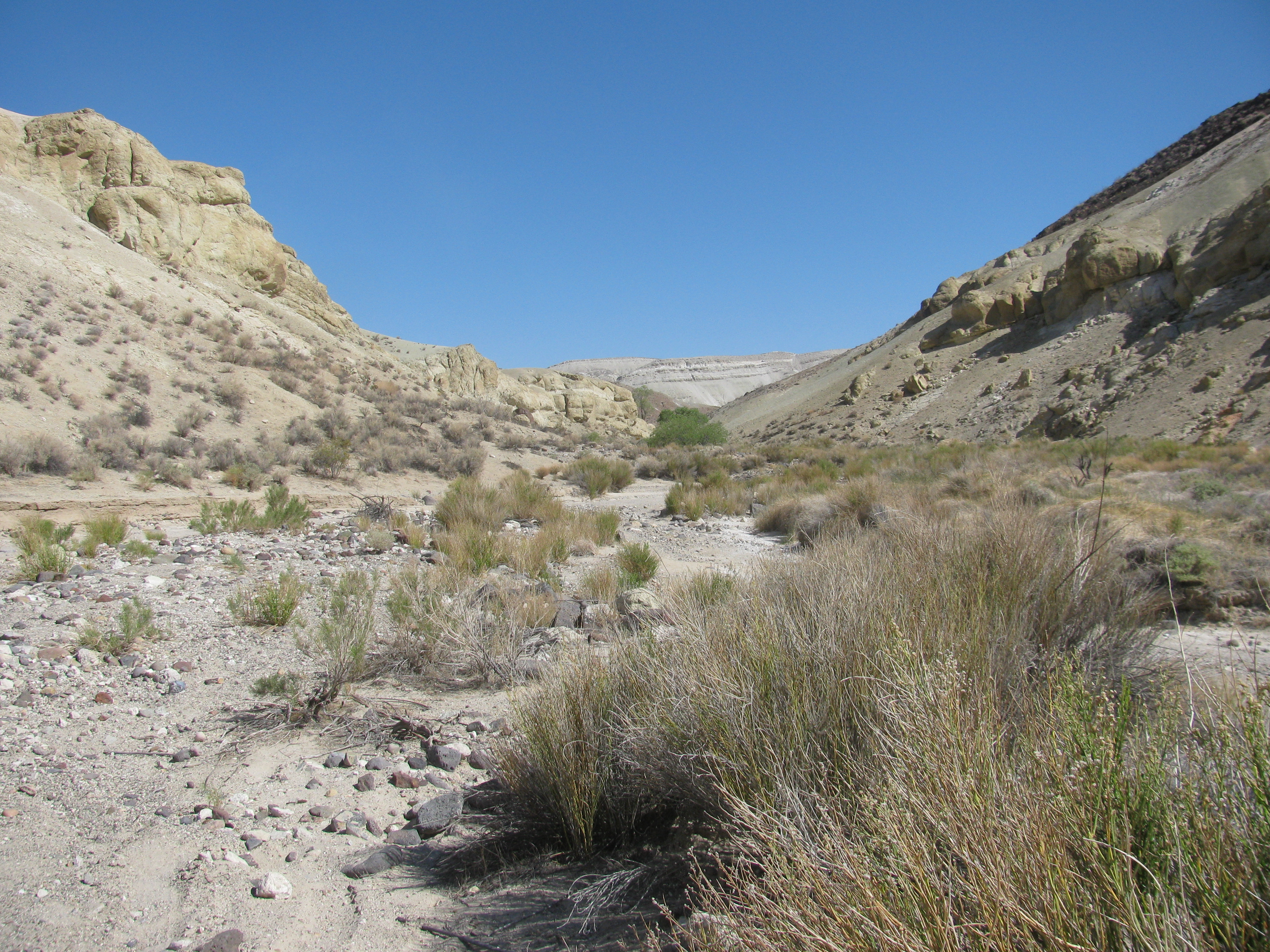
The canyon near Cudahy Camp
