= Golden Valley Wilderness =

Wilderness area in California, US

- IUCN category Ib (wilderness area)
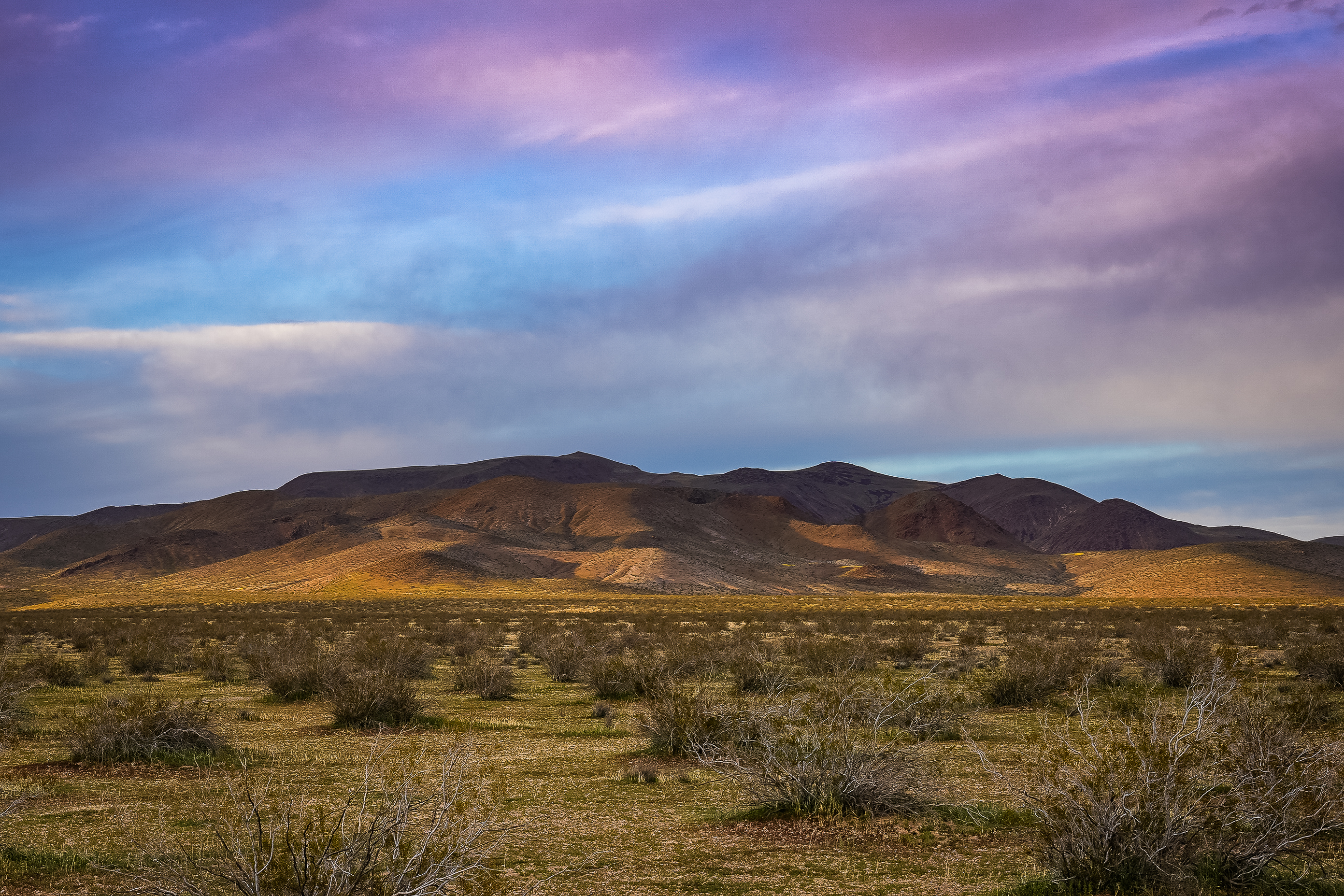
- Photo of the area

- Location within California
- Location: San Bernardino County, California
- Nearest city: Ridgecrest, California
- Coordinates: 35.415°N 117.510°W
- Area: 37,786 acres (15,291 ha)
- Established: October 31, 1994
- Governing body: U.S. Bureau of Land Management

Golden Valley Wilderness is a wilderness area located in San Bernardino County, California, near Ridgecrest. It covers 37,786 acres of the Mojave Desert, straddling both the Almond Mountains to the southeast and the Lava Mountains to the northwest in the Golden Valley. Steep canyons of sedimentary rocks line the valley walls, rising as much as 5,000 feet on Dome Mountain. In terms of wildlife, creosote bush scrub dominate the vegetation, while Joshua trees and wildflowers grow intermittently. The area also provides habitat for raptors, Mojave ground squirrels, and desert tortoises.

The area is managed by the Bureau of Land Management Ridgecrest Field Office and was established as part of the California Desert Protection Act of 1994.
