= Wahweap Creek =

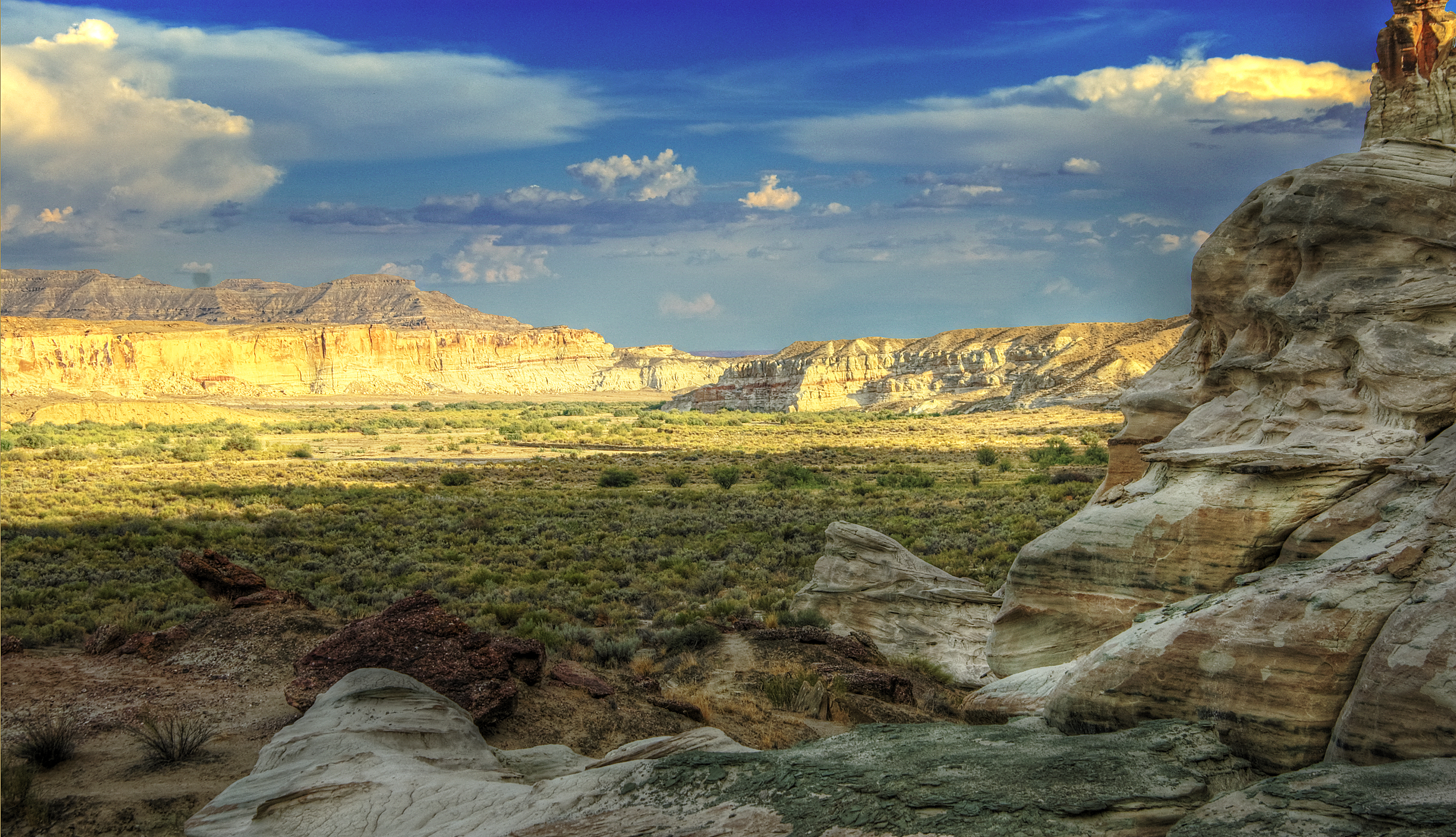
- Wahweap Creek Valley

Location
- Country: United States
- State: Utah

Physical characteristics
- Source: Canaan Peak
  - location: Dixie National Forest, Garfield County, Utah
  - coordinates: 37°36′20″N 111°47′40″W
  - elevation: 8,564 ft (2,610 m)
- Mouth: Lake Powell/Colorado River
  - location: Glen Canyon National Recreation Area, Kane County, Utah
  - coordinates: 37°02′15″N 111°34′18″W
  - elevation: 3,704 ft (1,129 m)
- Length: 55.6 mi (89.5 km)
- Basin size: 453 sq mi (1,170 km^{2})

Basin features
- Tributaries
  - left: Blue Wash, Long Canyon, Tommy Smith Creek, Smith Run, Ty Hatch Creek, Nipple Creek
  - right: Coyote Creek

Wahweap Creek is a 55.6-mile (89.5 km) long intermittent stream in southern Utah in the United States, and is a tributary of the Colorado River. It drains a rugged, high elevation, largely roadless mesa and canyon country in the Colorado Plateau region. The creek flows into the Lake Powell reservoir at Wahweap Bay where it gives its name to the Wahweap Marina, a popular access point to the Glen Canyon National Recreation Area.

The Dakota Sandstone Wahweap Hoodoos are located adjacent to the creek near Lake Powell, and are accessible by a hike in the dry streambed. Wahweap Creek also cuts through sections of the fossil-rich Wahweap Formation, which is named after the creek. Caution is essential when traveling in the area as the creek, though usually dry, is prone to large flash floods.

In the 1950s, Wahweap Creek was the site of Glen Canyon City (present-day Big Water), one of the main Bureau of Reclamation camps for the construction of Glen Canyon Dam which forms Lake Powell. The creek bed was the main source of gravel aggregate for the concrete used in the dam.

== Course ==
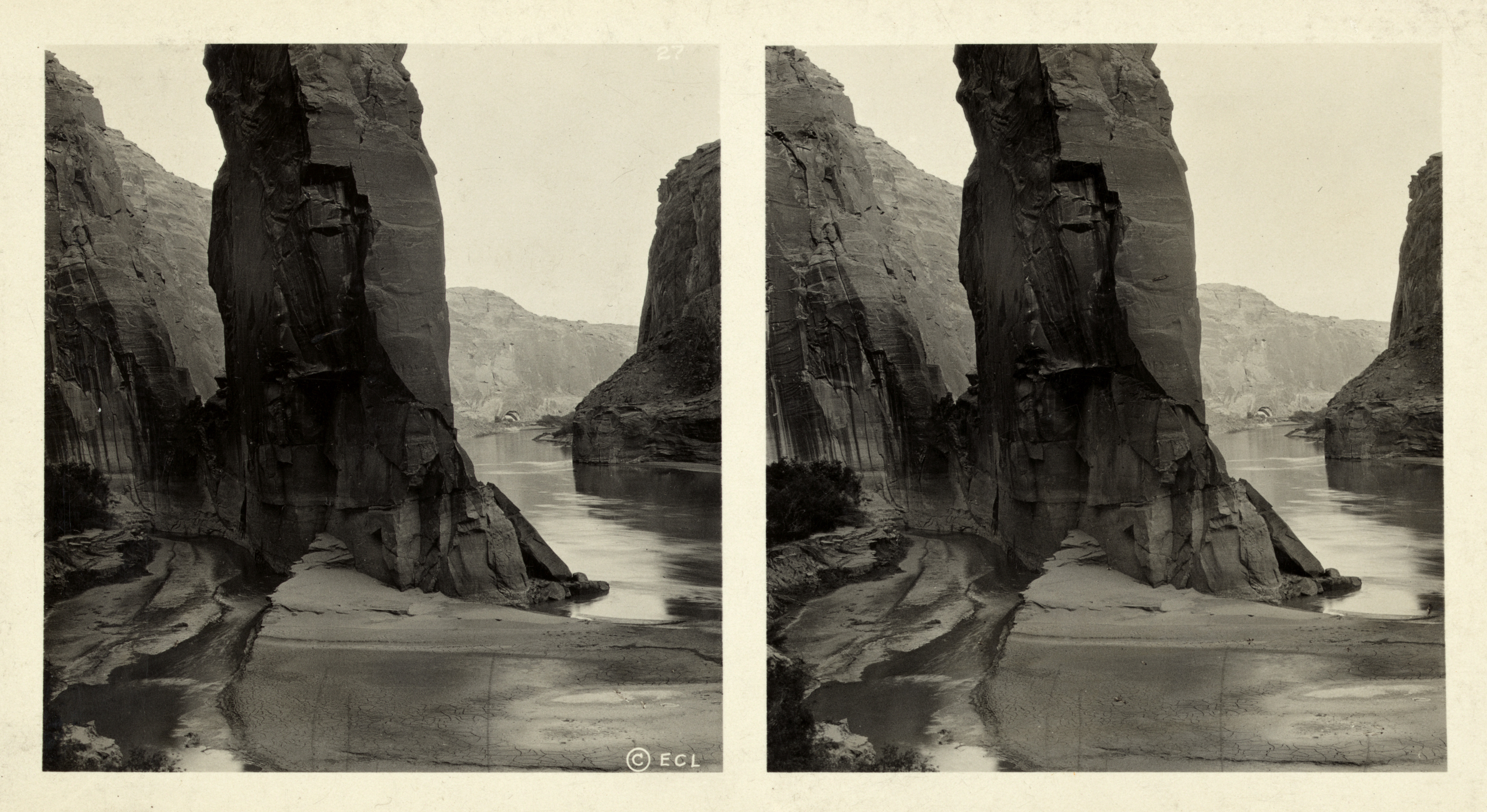
"Sentinel Rock at the mouth of Wahweap Creek" by Eugene LaRue c. 1922, before the construction of Glen Canyon Dam. This location is now about 400 feet (120 m) under the surface of Lake Powell.

Wahweap Creek begins in Garfield County, near Canaan Peak on the Kaiparowits Plateau at elevations above 8,500 feet (2,600 m), and flows south into Kane County. It receives Long Canyon and Tommy Smith Creeks from the left, then descends into a canyon where it loses about 1,200 feet (370 m) of elevation in 15 miles (24 km). It continues south as a wide arroyo, receives Coyote Creek from the right and turns southeast past Big Water where U.S. Route 89 skirts the creek, before emptying into Wahweap Bay, an arm of Lake Powell. Lake levels fluctuate between 3,550 feet (1,080 m) in droughts, to a maximum recorded level of 3,708 feet (1,130 m). Before the construction of Glen Canyon Dam, Wahweap Creek flowed for another 7 miles (11 km) before joining the Colorado River near Page in Coconino County, Arizona.

The Wahweap Creek watershed comprises about 453 square miles (1,170 km^{2}) of arid canyon country. The upper part of the creek flows through the Dixie National Forest and the Grand Staircase–Escalante National Monument, and much of the lower section lies in the Glen Canyon National Recreation Area. As a whole, the watershed is more than 85 percent federally owned. Only 2.1 miles (3.4 km) of the headwaters of Wahweap Creek are perennial and host significant fish populations.

== See also ==
- List of rivers of Arizona
- List of rivers of Utah
- List of tributaries of the Colorado River
