= Summit Range =

California mountain range

- Location within California

Highest point
- Elevation: 1,104 m (3,622 ft)

Geography
- Country: United States
- State: California
- District: San Bernardino County
- Range coordinates: 35°27′39.858″N 117°34′46.212″W
- Topo map: USGS Klinker Mountain

The Summit Range is a mountain range in San Bernardino County, California.

They are one of the eastern limits of the Fremont Valley, and in the Mojave Desert.
