= Fremont Valley =

Valley in California, United States

The Fremont Valley is a valley located in the western Mojave Desert of California.

It stretches from the town of Mojave approximately 70 km northeast to the foothills of the Lava Mountains and Summit Range.

The valley is home to Koehn Dry Lake and the Desert Tortoise Natural Area, as well as the communities of California City and Cantil, California.

The Rand Mountains are at the eastern edge of the Fremont Valley. The southern Sierra Nevada make up the western border and the Tehachapi Mountains border the valley from the southwest.

35.108301°N 118.047017°W

== See also ==
- Category: Valleys of the Mojave Desert
