= Rand Mountains =

Mountain range in California, United States

- Location within California

Highest point
- Elevation: 1,049 m (3,442 ft)

Geography
- Country: United States
- State: California
- District: Kern County
- Range coordinates: 35°17′41.871″N 117°46′38.228″W
- Topo map: USGS Saltdale SE

The Rand Mountains are located in the Mojave Desert northeast of California City and southwest of the town of Randsburg.

== History ==
The mountains were the location of the Rand Mining District, with the mining towns of Randsburg, Red Mountain, and Johannesburg, now approaching ghost town status.

== Geography ==
The mountains lie in a southwest-northeasterly direction at the eastern edge of the Fremont Valley. The Scodie Mountains and the Sierra Nevada are to the west. The range stretches approximately 15 miles from the Desert Tortoise Natural Area to the old mining areas of Randsburg.

The principal peaks of the range are Government Peak, at 4,741 feet, and Sidney Peak, at 4,372 feet above sea level. The Rand Mountains receive very little rainfall in a normal year, typically less than seven inches.

== See also ==
- Burro Schmidt Tunnel
- Category: Mountain ranges of the Mojave Desert
