= Lava Mountains =

Mountain range in California, United States

- Location within California

Highest point
- Elevation: 1,392 m (4,567 ft)

Geography
- Country: United States
- State: California
- District: San Bernardino County
- Range coordinates: 35°26′13.862″N 117°31′11.206″W
- Topo map: USGS Klinker Mountain

The Lava Mountains are a mountain range located along the northern edge of the Mojave Desert, in San Bernardino County, California. They are one of the eastern limits of the Fremont Valley. They span the northwestern portion of the Golden Valley Wilderness, which sits between it and the Almond Mountains on the southeastern side. The mountain range is cut by several deep-walled canyons with distinctive layers of multicolored sedimentary rocks. The peak of the mountain range is at around 5,000 feet on Dome Mountain.

== Geology ==
The mountains are located along the Garlock Fault. The Blackwater fault passes through the southwestern part of the area, and the Brown's Ranch fault zone and its associated faults pass through the western part.

The pre-Tertiary rocks in the area mainly consist of quartz monzonite. The major sedimentary unit is the Bedrock Spring Formation, which is chiefly composed of arkosic sandstone and conglomerate, as well as some silstone and brecciated volcanic rocks. That formation is overlain by the Almond Mountain volcanics and the Klinker Mountain volcanics in the eastern and western parts of the region, respectively. Overlying these are flows of Lava Mountains andesite dating to the late Pliocene, which are finally covered by Quaternary gravels, alluvium, and travertine. All of the volcanic rocks in the area are plagioclase andesite porphyries.
