= Honda Proving Center of California =

American automobile testing track

Coordinates: 35.271551°N 117.957802°W

Honda Proving Center of California (HPCC) is a test track established in 1990 and used primarily for testing Honda and Acura automobiles, although motorcycles are also tested there. HPCC is located near Cantil, California, in Kern County. Security is tight, and pilots flying near the track have reported seeing cars immediately heading for cover as they got close to the facility.

== Track ==
HPCC has a 7.5 mi (12.1 km) oval track, as well as a 5 mi (8.0 km) winding road course.

== History ==
Honda America - Honda Research and Development Division, closed the HPCC in 2010 and relocated the test center to Marysville, Ohio. The property was put on the market.

On December 8, 2015, American Honda announced that they would renovate and expand the HPCC, with some new vehicle test road enhancements. It was scheduled to reopen in April 2016.

On May 22, 2017, American Honda announced the opening of the renovated facility.
