= Desert Tortoise Natural Area =

Area in the western Mojave Desert

Coordinates: 35°10′13″N 117°54′01″W

The Desert Tortoise Research Natural Area (DTRNA) is a 39.5-square-mile (102 km^{2}) area in the western Mojave Desert, located in eastern Kern County, Southern California. It was created to protect the native desert tortoise (Gopherus agassizii), which is also the California state reptile.

The area is located at the southwestern end of the Rand Mountains, northeast of California City, and has an interpretive center for visitors.

640 acres (260 ha) of the land was given to the Bureau of Land Management in a 1980 agreement over the Great Western Cities Company land schemes as part of an effort to acquire clear title.

The Bureau of Land Management recognized the significance of the area and designated it an "Area of Critical Environmental Concern" and as a "Research Natural Area" in 1980.
