= Garlock, California =

Unincorporated community in California, United States

Garlock
- Unincorporated community
- Location in California Garlock (the United States)
- Coordinates: 35°24′09″N 117°47′24″W
- Country: United States
- State: California
- County: Kern
- Elevation: 2,169 ft (661 m)

California Historical Landmark
- Reference no.: 671

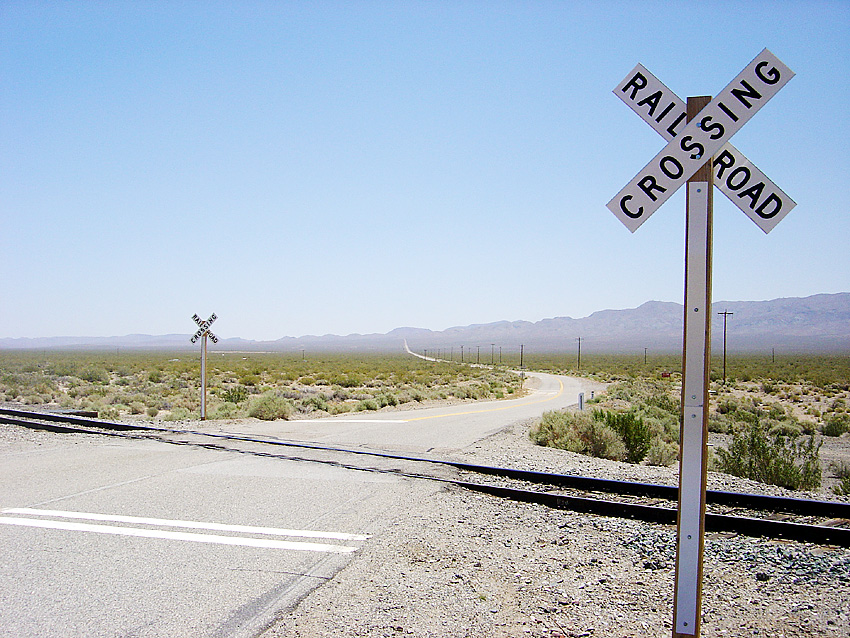
American crossbucks at the intersection of Redrock Randsburg Road and the Southern Pacific (now Union Pacific) Railroad, in the Mojave Desert near Garlock, California, May 2004

Garlock (formerly, Eugeneville) is an unincorporated community in Kern County, California, United States. It is located 6.25 miles (10 km) east-southeast of Saltdale, at an elevation of 2,169 feet (661 m).

A post office operated at Garlock from 1896 to 1904 and from 1923 to 1926.

Garlock is a ghost town that was known as El Paso City or Cow Wells interchangeably. The little town provided water for cattlemen and freighters wishing to avoid the potentially treacherous washes in Red Rock Canyon. Some gold had been found in the canyons of the El Paso Mountains, enough to warrant an arrastra being built in 1887. In 1893 a nugget was brought in worth $1,900 from Goler Heights and so the rush began. In 1894 Eugene Garlock of Tehachapi moved in an eight stamp mill. Miners would talk of going down to "the Garlock mill," "down to the Garlock," and finally just "Garlock."

Three miles to the southwest was the site of Old Garlock.

== California Historical Landmark ==
The site is now registered as California Historical Landmark #671, designated on December 1, 1958. the marker is 7.4 mi W of State Hwy 395 on Garlock Rd, 13.4 mi NE of Cantil post office.

The California Historical Landmark reads:

NO. 671 SITE OF THE TOWN OF GARLOCK - In 1896, Eugene Garlock constructed a stamp mill near this spot to crush gold ore from the Yellow Aster Mine on Rand Mountain. Known originally as Cow Wells by prospectors and freighters during the 1880s and early 1890s, the town of Garlock continued to thrive until 1898, when water was piped from here to Randsburg and the Kramer-Randsburg rail line was completed.

== See also ==
- California Historical Landmarks in Kern County
- California Historical Landmark

== See also ==
- List of California Historical Landmarks
- List of ghost towns in California
