= Saltdale, California =

Unincorporated community in California, United States

Saltdale
- Unincorporated community
- Location in California Saltdale (the United States)
- Coordinates: 35°21′33″N 117°53′15″W
- Country: United States
- State: California
- County: Kern
- Elevation: 1,923 ft (586 m)

Saltdale is an unincorporated community in Kern County, California, United States. It is located near Koehn Lake, 21 miles (34 km) south-southwest of Ridgecrest near Garlock.

It is at an elevation of 1,923 feet (586 m).

The town was founded in 1914 for salt harvesting from Koehn Dry Lake.

A post office operated at Saltdale from 1916 to 1950.

== See also ==
- Category: Mining communities in California
