= Red Rock Canyon State Park (California) =

State park in California, United States

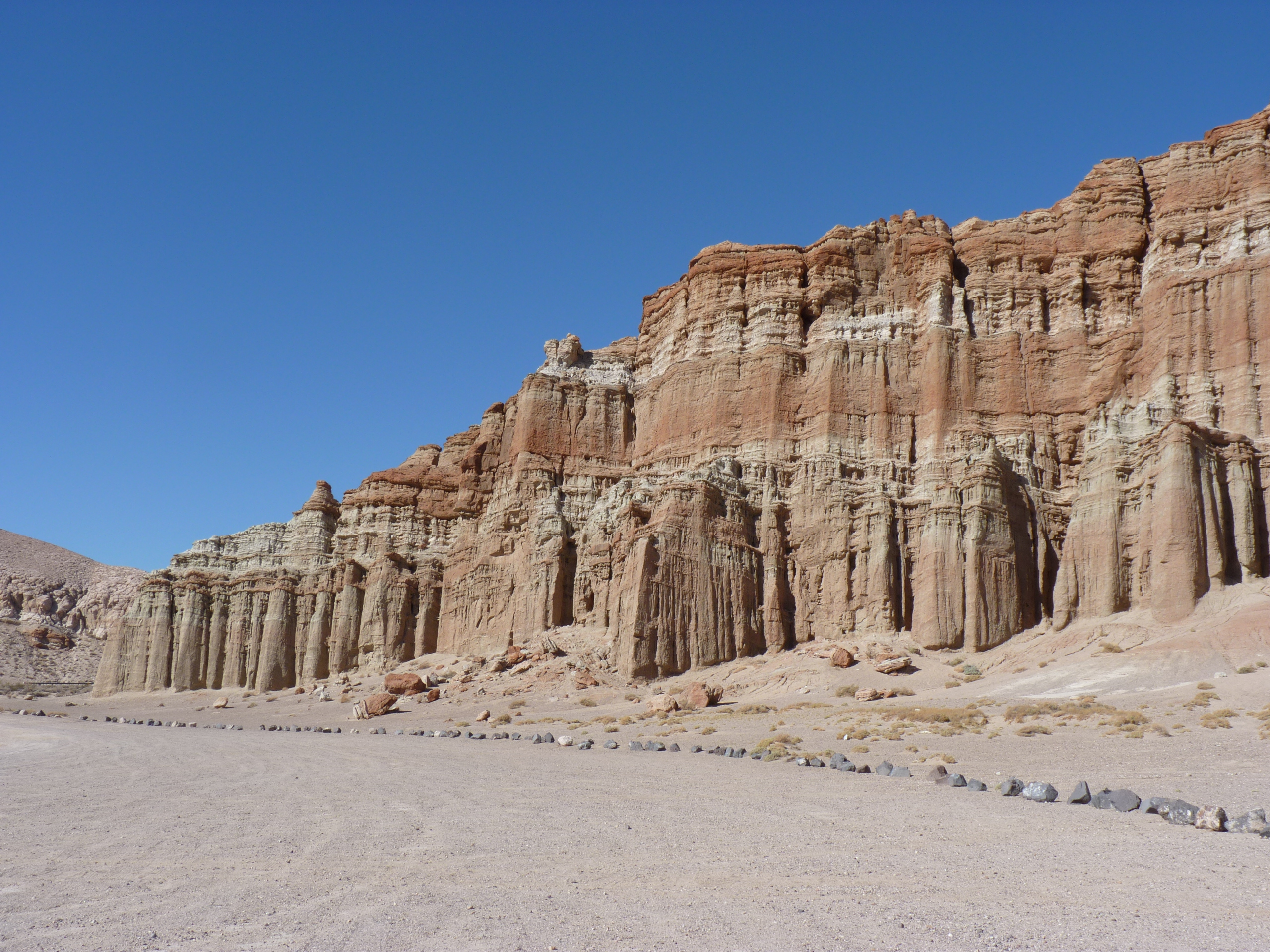

- Location within California Location within the United States
- Location: Kern County, California, United States
- Nearest city: Cantil, California
- Coordinates: 35°22′22.75″N 117°59′26.47″W
- Area: 27,000 acres (110 km^{2})
- Elevation: 2,600 feet (790 m)
- Established: 1968
- Governing body: California Department of Parks and Recreation

Red Rock Canyon State Park is a state park in the U.S. state of California which features scenic desert cliffs, buttes and spectacular rock formations. The park consists of approximately 27,000 acres (110 km^{2}) within the Mojave Sector of the Tehachapi District of the California State Park System, and is located along State Highway 14 in Kern County, about 80 miles (129 km) east of Bakersfield and 25 miles (40 km) north of Mojave, where the southernmost tip of the Sierra Nevada converges with the El Paso Mountains.

Each tributary canyon is unique, with vivid colors due to alternate layers of white clay and red sandstone, further accented by pink volcanic rocks and brown lava formations. The canyon was formed 3 million years ago. After wet winters, the park's floral displays are notable. Three overlapping desert ecosystems provide for the wildlife that includes eagles, falcons, roadrunners, hawks, coyotes, kit foxes, bobcats, lizards, mice and squirrels. Red Rock Canyon provides magnificent views of the pristine desert landscape, includes two natural preserves, and offers, among other recreational activities, camping, sightseeing, equestrian activities, hiking, and opportunities for solitude.

== Location ==
The park is located on State Route 14, which connects U.S. Route 395 with the communities of Southern California, where 14 is known as the Antelope Valley Freeway. The park is 25 miles (40 km) northeast of Mojave on SR 14. SR 14 goes through the center of the park, in the canyon itself. No motorist/tourist facilities are available. It is not far from Cantil, California. Camping, picnic, and restroom facilities are available in several sites immediately off of California Route 14.

== History ==
The area was once home to the Kawaiisu people. Some petroglyphs and pictographs are found in the El Paso Mountains and represent ritual sites from ancestors of the Coso people were early indigenous inhabitants of this locale. They created extensive carvings in rock within the El Paso and neighboring mountains of Red Rock Canyon. and conducted considerable trade with other tribes as far as the Chumash on the Pacific coast.

The colorful rock formations in the park served as landmarks during the early 1870s for 20-mule team freight wagons that stopped for water. The park protects significant paleontology sites and the remains of 1890s-era mining operations.

== 1933 and 1999 ==
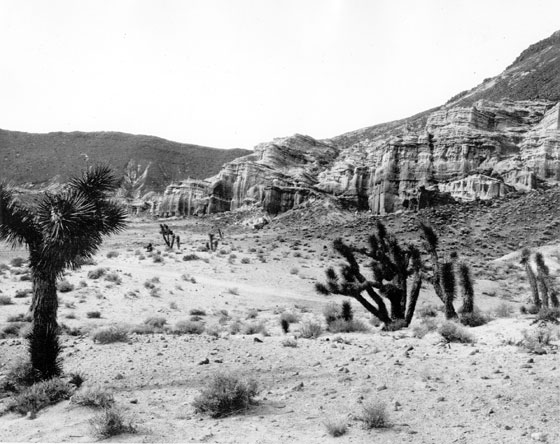
1933

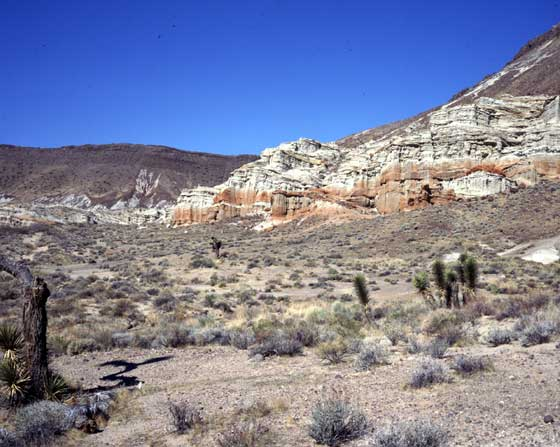
1999

Between these two photographs, 66 years have elapsed. In the 1933 picture Red Rock Canyon was on U.S. Route 6, a well-traveled route from Bishop to Los Angeles along the east side of the Sierra Nevada. The scenery at this point in the road eventually led to the creation of Red Rock Canyon State Park in 1968. A dirt road crosses the center of the view.

In the 1999 photo, a total of 17 species are now present in the foreground. No Yuccas, Joshua trees or other plants have persisted over the 66 years between the dates of the photographs. In most of the repeat photography, few Yuccas appear to live longer than about 40 years. Many more plants appear in the 1999 view, partially in response to decreased disturbance as well as increased precipitation in the latter part of the 20th century. For example, the road that previously crossed the foreground is difficult to detect. The foreground of this view is geomorphically active, and small rills and gullies cross parts of the foreground. Young geomorphic surfaces, such as that portrayed in this 1999 view, support young plant assemblages that recover relatively quickly following cessation of disturbance.

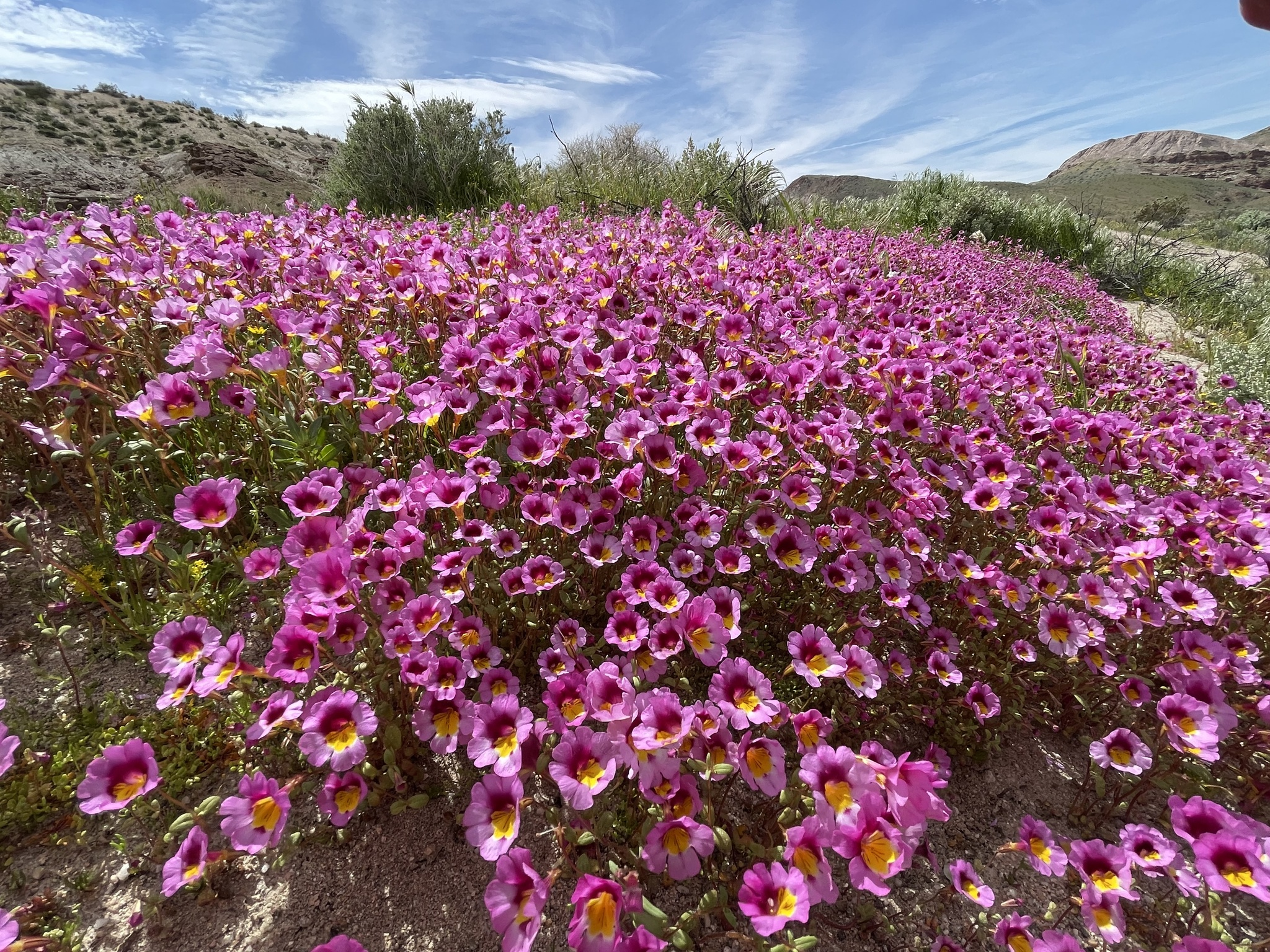
Red Rock Canyon monkeyflower is a rare California endemic wildflower found only in Kern County

== Filming location ==
Providing several unique, dramatic areas, and close to Los Angeles, since the 1930s Hollywood has frequently filmed at Red Rock Canyon, including motion pictures, television series, advertisements, and music videos. Among the many westerns filmed there were The Big Country, Man of the West, and The Outlaw, and such diverse movies as The Andromeda Strain, Mesa of Lost Women, Radar Men from the Moon, Beneath the Planet of the Apes, Buck Rogers (serial), Capricorn One, The Mummy, Zorro Rides Again, Jurassic Park, I'll Be Home for Christmas, Missile to the Moon, The Car, Westworld, Savages, and TV series Airwolf, Galactica 1980, Lost in Space and The Twilight Zone . 40 Guns to Apache Pass, the last film of Audie Murphy, was shot there in 1966. The 2005 music video Cater 2 U by Destiny's Child was filmed at Red Rock Canyon. The 2006 video for British rock band Muse song "Knights of Cydonia" was shot in the park as well. The opening scene of The Darkness (2016) was also filmed here.

== Astronomy ==
Red Rock Canyon is one of the darkest skies within a two hour driving distance of Los Angeles. The dry climate, frequently cloudless skies, and relatively low light pollution enhance nighttime viewing conditions. The park is a Bortle class 2-3 site, ranging from an "average dark sky" in northern regions to a sky typical of a rural area in southern regions. On a clear night with no moon, visitors with good eyesight and dark adapted vision may see both the Andromeda and Triangulum galaxies with the unaided eye, and the central Milky Way shows complex structure from this site. While the southern sky suffers from light pollution from nearby towns, dark sky conditions in the park are nonetheless exceptional relative to nearby urban areas.

== Gallery ==
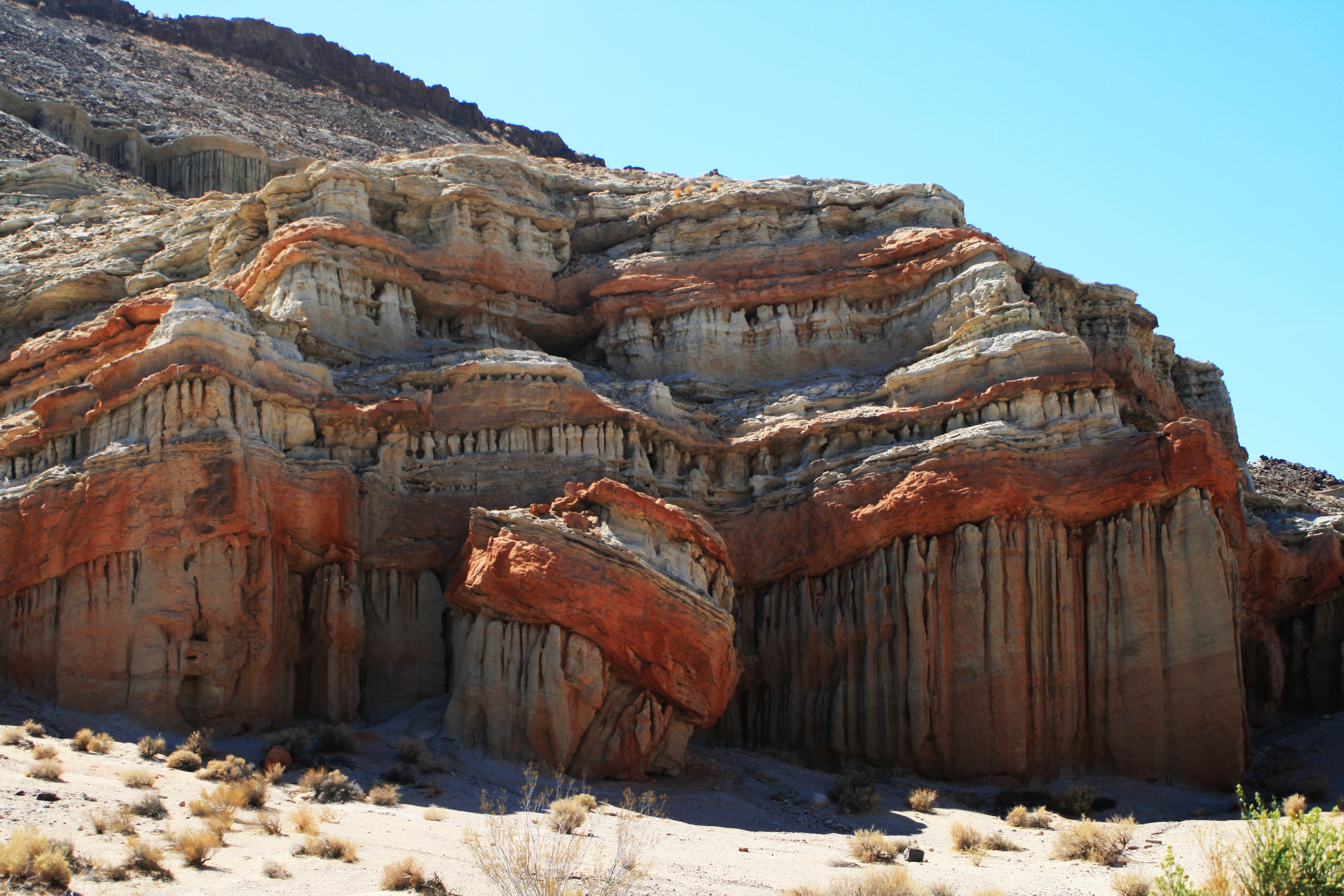
A prominent rock formation near the park entrance.

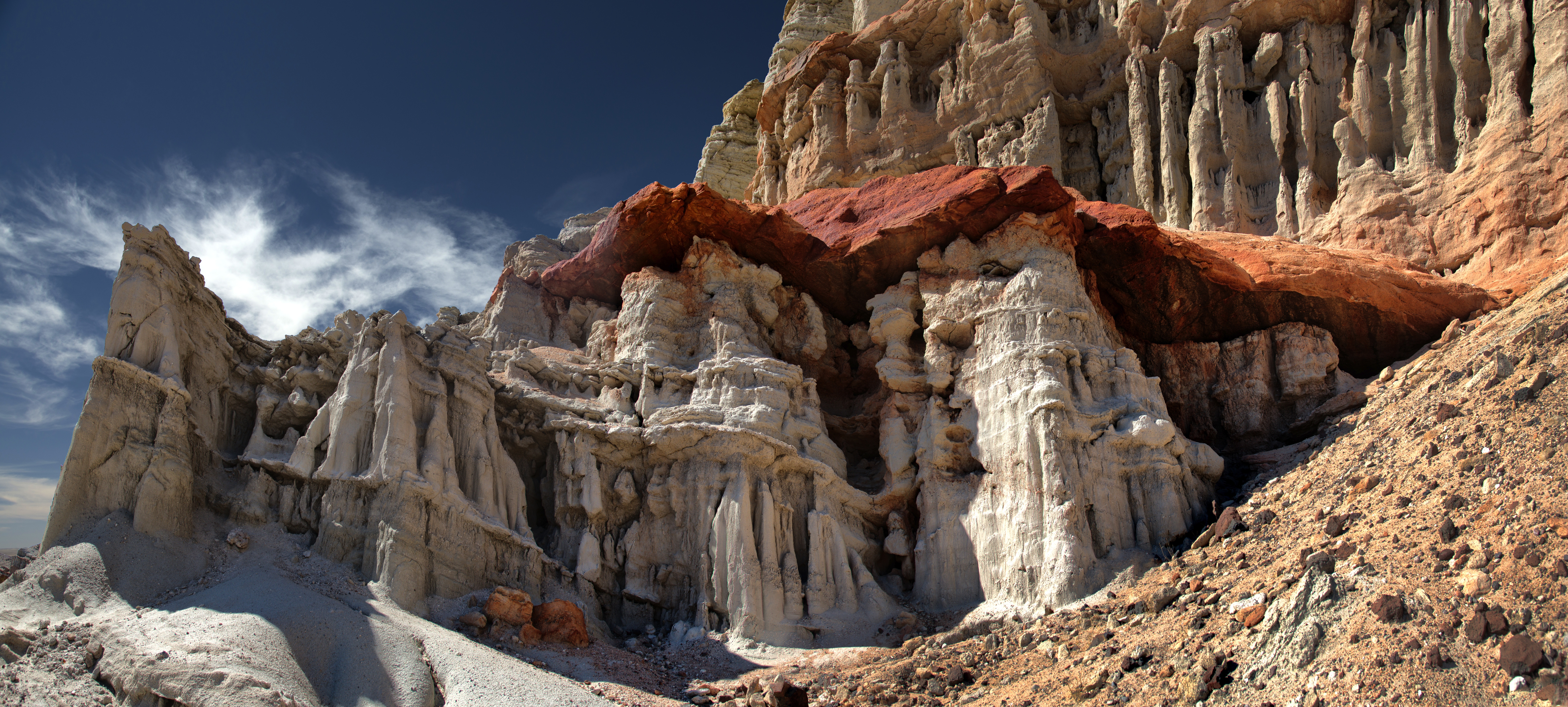
Detail of the many hoodoos found along the canyon walls.

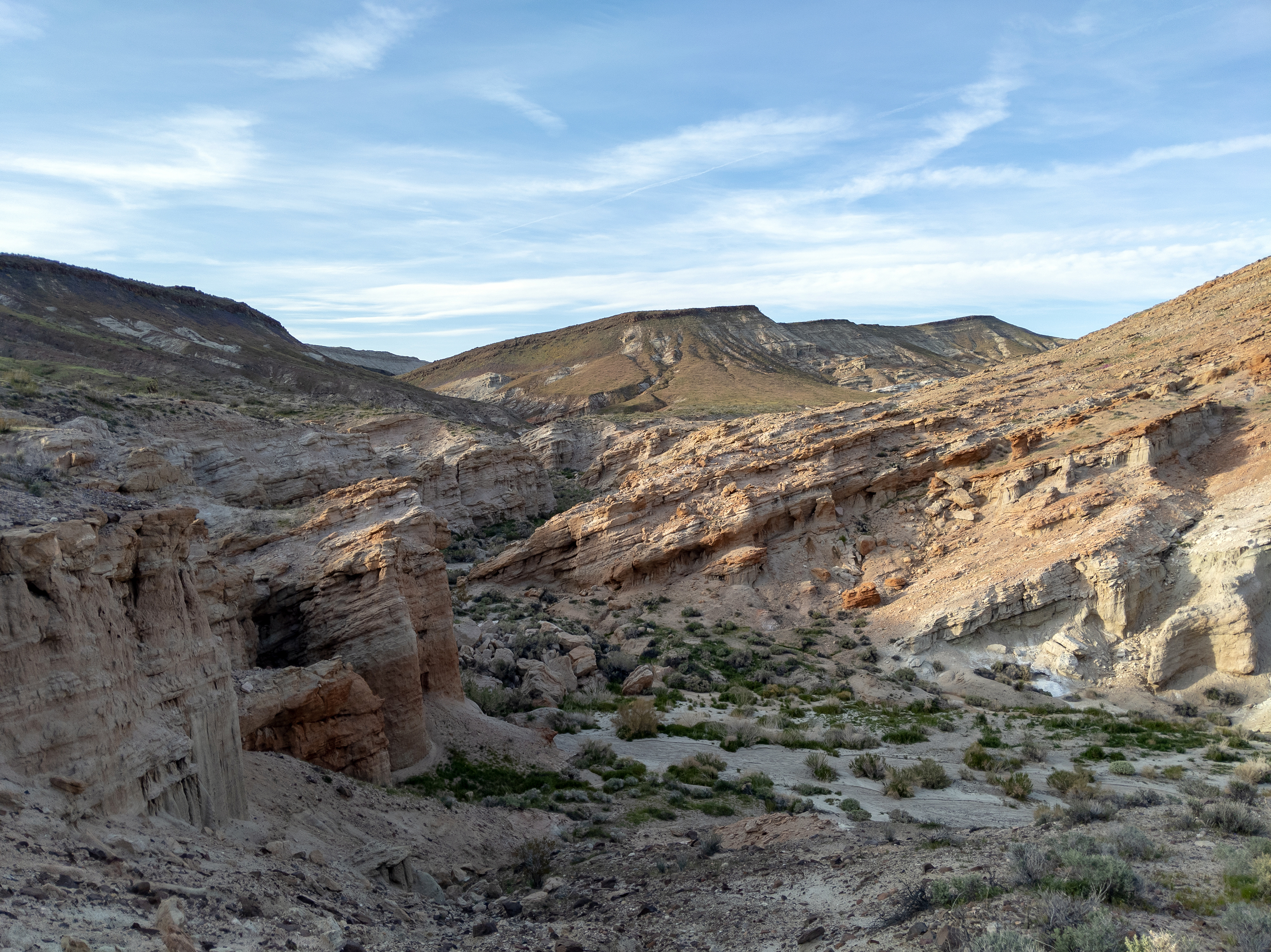
A rocky valley shaped by uplift and erosion.

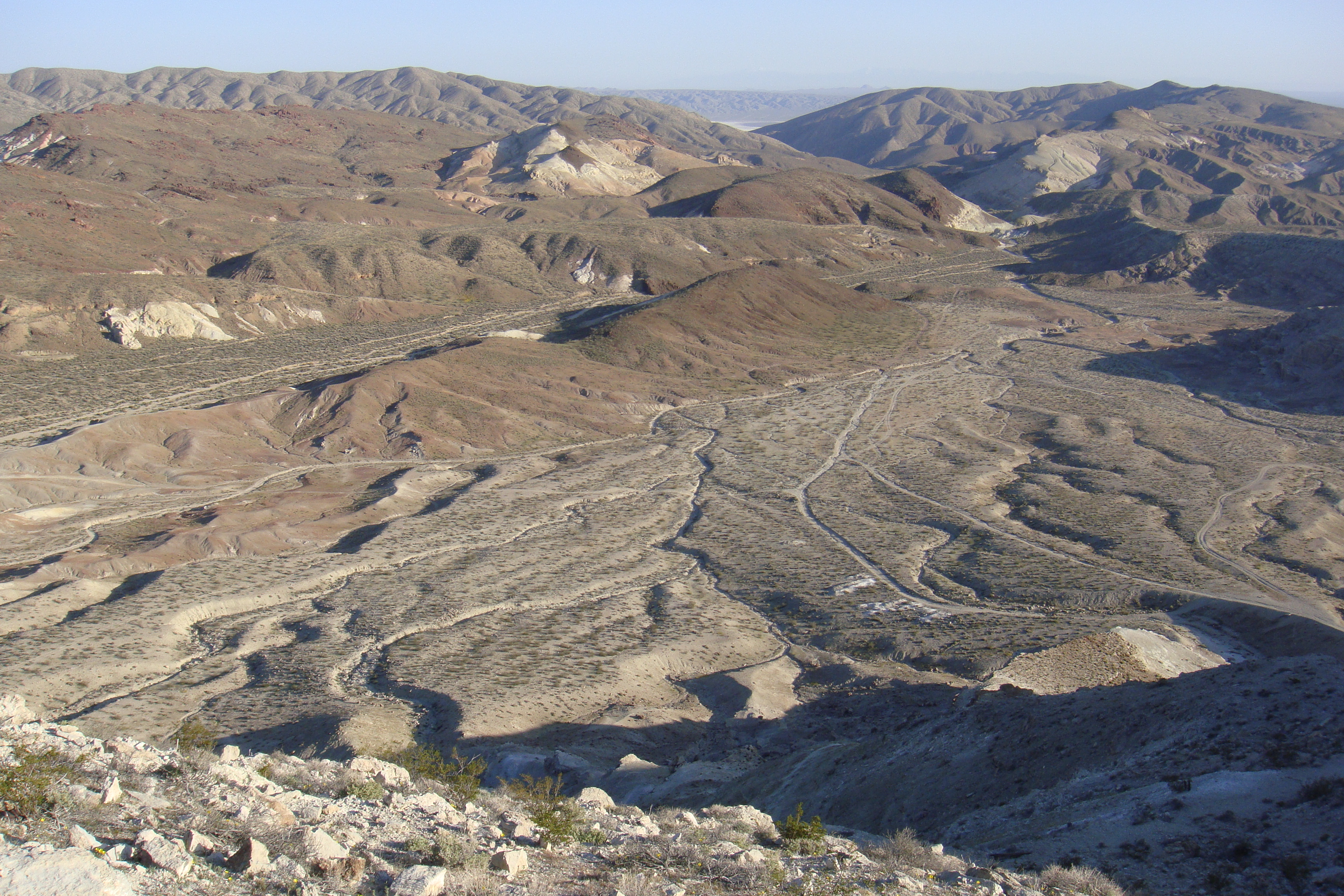
An alluvial plain in the center of the park

== See also ==
- List of California state parks
- Erythranthe rhodopetra

== Additional sources ==
- Campbell Grant, James W. Baird and J. Kenneth Pringle. 1968. Rock drawings of the Coso Range, Inyo County, California: an ancient sheep-hunting cult pictured in desert rock carvings, second edition, Maturango Press, 145 pages
- Alan P. Garfinkel. 2004. Dating "Classic" Coso Style Sheep Petroglyphs in the Coso Range and El Paso Mountains: Implications for Regional Prehistory, v.2/15/04
- C. Michael Hogan. 2008. Morro Creek, ed. by A. Burnham
- California Department of Parks & Recreation
- Information from DesertUSA
- USGS Repeat Photography for the Mojave Desert
- Red Rock Canyon State Park (California)
