= El Paso Mountains Wilderness =

Protected wilderness area in California, United States

- IUCN category Ib (wilderness area)
- El Paso Mountains.

- Location within southern California Location within California Location within the United States
- Interactive map of El Paso Mountains Wilderness
- Location: Kern County, California, United States
- Nearest city: Ridgecrest, CA
- Coordinates: 35°28′N 117°50′W
- Area: 23,780 acres (96.2 km^{2})
- Established: October 31, 1994
- Governing body: U.S. Bureau of Land Management

The El Paso Mountains Wilderness was created in 1994 and now has a total of 23,780 acres (96.2 km^{2}). All of the wilderness is in the northern Mojave Desert in eastern Kern County, California and is managed by the Bureau of Land Management. It is located south of Ridgecrest, California.

== Geography ==
The wilderness contains numerous reddish-colored buttes and dark, uplifted volcanic mesas dissected by narrow canyons. The highest point and central feature of this wilderness is Black Mountain, 5,244 feet (1,598 m), an extinct volcano. Surrounding the mountain is a badlands topography.

== Flora and fauna ==
The most spectacular attribute of this area is the abundance of cultural sites. The southern portion of the wilderness is included in the Last Chance Archaeological District and is listed on the National Register of Historic Places. Wildlife includes raptors, Mohave ground squirrel, and the desert tortoise. Vegetation primarily consists of creosote bush scrub community with Joshua trees on the western side of the mountain.

El Paso Mountains Wilderness border sign

== See also ==
- Protected areas of the Mojave Desert
- Category: Flora of the California desert regions
- Category: Fauna of the Mojave Desert

== Sources ==
- BLM−Bureau of Land Management: Official El Paso Mountains Wilderness website
- Wilderness.net: El Paso Mountains Wilderness
- Adventuring in the California Desert; Lynne Foster; Sierra Club Books; 1987; (ISBN 0-87156-721-0)
