= List of awards and nominations received by CNCO =

CNCO awards and nominations
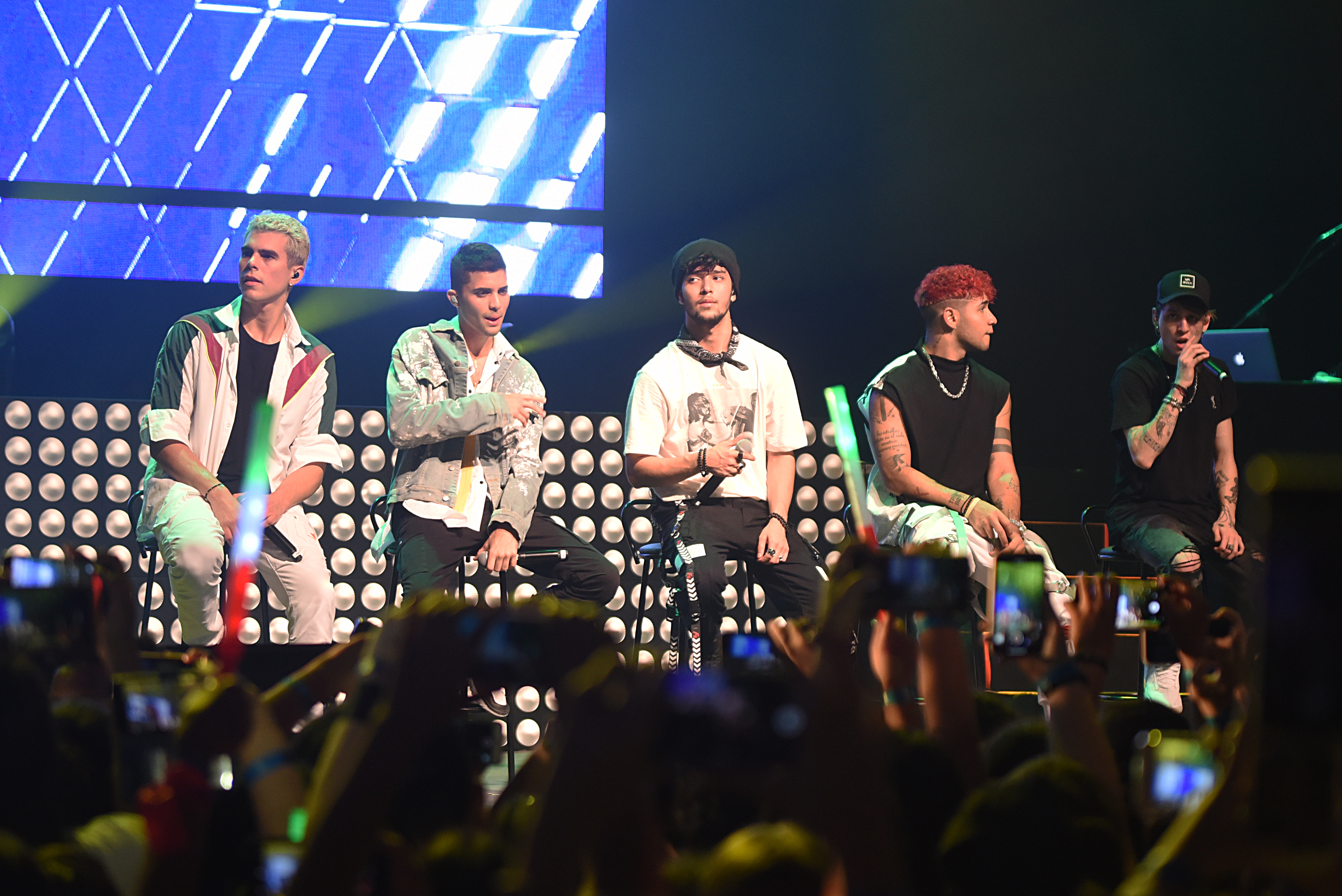
- CNCO performing in 2019
Awards and nominations
Award	Wins	Nominations
Billboard Latin Music Awards	7	12
Billboard Music Awards	0	1
BreakTudo Awards	0	3
Gardel Awards	0	1
Heat Latin Music Awards	2	4
iHeartRadio Music Awards	2	n/a
Latin American Music Awards	13	13
Latin Grammy Awards	0	1
Latin Italian Music Awards	19	20
Latino Music Awards	1	2
Lo Nuestro Awards	9	14
Meus Prêmios Nick	0	2
Monitor Latino Music Awards	0	1
MTV Millennial Awards	1	5
MTV Video Music Awards	1	4
Nickelodeon Argentina Kids' Choice Awards	0	2
Nickelodeon Colombia Kids' Choice Awards	1	2
Nickelodeon Mexico Kids' Choice Awards	4	9
People's Choice Awards	1	3
Premios Juventud	7	15
Premios Tu Música Urbano	1	3
SESAC Latina Music Awards	1	1
Teen Choice Awards	4	11
Telehit Awards	1	1
The Pop Hub Awards	2	4
Tudo Information Awards	0	1
Your World Awards	3	3

Totals (Note: Certain award groups do not simply award one winner. They acknowledge several different recipients, have runners-up, and have third place. Since this is a specific recognition and is different from losing an award, runner-up mentions are considered wins in this award tally. For simplification and to avoid errors, each award in this list has been presumed to have had a prior nomination.)
- Wins: 80
- Nominations: 146

CNCO was a Latin-American boy band formed in the first season of La Banda. It consisted of Christopher Vélez, Richard Camacho, Zabdiel de Jesús and Erick Brian Colón; Joel Pimentel previously left the group in May 2021. They released their debut album Primera Cita in August 26, 2016, containing their third single and breakthrough hit "Reggaeton Lento (Bailemos)". The album garnered them a Lo Nuestro Award for Pop/Rock Album of the Year, a nomination for Latin Pop Album of the Year at the Billboard Latin Music Awards, and two Latin American Music Awards for Favorite Pop Album and Album of the Year.

The band released their second studio album CNCO in April 2018. They won a Latin AMA for Favorite Pop album and a Billboard Latin Music Award for Latin Pop Album of the Year. Their debut EP, Que Quiénes Somos, was nominated for Pop Album of the Year at the Premio Lo Nuestro 2021.

As a band, they have been nominated for several accolades, such as Premios Juventud, Latin AMAs, Billboard Latin Music Awards, IHeartRadio Music Awards, MTV Video Music Awards, and a Latin Grammy Awards for Best New Artist, winning most of them throughout the years and even being the first Latin boyband to win a Moonman (VMA).

At the July 2022 Premios Juventud ceremony, during their acceptance speech for "Best Fandom", member Zabdiel de Jesús announced that the band would split up in a year and a half from that time frame. The group held their last concert and separated on November 17, 2023.

== Awards and nominations ==
Name of the award ceremony, year presented, category, nominee(s) of the award, and the result of the nomination
Award	Year (Note: Indicates the year of ceremony. Each year is linked to the article about the awards held that year, wherever possible.)	Category	Recipient(s) and nominee(s)	Result	Ref.
Billboard Latin Music Awards	2017	Artist of the Year, New	CNCO	Won	
Billboard Latin Music Awards	2017	Latin Pop Songs Artist of the Year, Duo or Group	CNCO	Won	
Billboard Latin Music Awards	2017	Latin Pop Albums Artist of the Year, Duo or Group	CNCO	Won	
Billboard Latin Music Awards	2017	Latin Pop Album of the Year	Primera Cita	Nominated	
Billboard Latin Music Awards	2018	Latin Pop Artist of the Year, Duo or Group	CNCO	Won	
Billboard Latin Music Awards	2018	Hot Latin Songs Artist of the Year, Duo or Group	CNCO	Nominated	
Billboard Latin Music Awards	2018	Top Latin Albums Artist of the Year, Duo or Group	CNCO	Nominated	
Billboard Latin Music Awards	2018	Latin Pop Album of the Year	Primera Cita	Nominated	
Billboard Latin Music Awards	2019	Latin Pop Artist of the Year, Duo or Group	CNCO	Won	
Billboard Latin Music Awards	2019	Latin Rhythm Artist of the Year, Duo or Group	CNCO	Won	
Billboard Latin Music Awards	2019	Latin Pop Album of the Year	CNCO	Won	
Billboard Latin Music Awards	2020	Latin Pop Artist of the Year, Duo or Group	CNCO	Nominated	
Billboard Latin Music Awards	2020	Latin Rhythm Artist of the Year, Duo or Group	CNCO	Nominated	
Billboard Latin Music Awards	2021	Latin Pop Duo/Group of the Year	CNCO	Nominated	
Billboard Latin Music Awards	2022	Latin Pop Duo/Group of the Year	CNCO	Nominated	
Billboard Music Awards	2017	Top Latin Album	Primera Cita	Nominated	
BreakTudo Awards	2017	Best International Group	CNCO	Nominated	
BreakTudo Awards	2018	Best International Group	CNCO	Nominated	
BreakTudo Awards	2019	International Fandom	CNCOwners	Nominated	
BreakTudo Awards	2020	Best International Group	CNCO	Nominated	
BreakTudo Awards	2021	Best International Group	CNCO	Nominated	
Gardel Awards	2020	Collaboration of the Year	"Como Así" (with Lali)	Nominated	
Heat Latin Music Awards	2017	Best New Artist	CNCO	Won	
Heat Latin Music Awards	2019	Best Band or Group	CNCO	Nominated	
Heat Latin Music Awards	2020	Best Band or Group	CNCO	Nominated	
Heat Latin Music Awards	2021	Best Band or Group	CNCO	Won	
IHeartRadio Music Awards	2017	Best New Latin Artist	CNCO	Won	
IHeartRadio Music Awards	2017	Best New Artist	CNCO	Nominated	
IHeartRadio Music Awards	2018	Best Remix	"Reggaetón Lento (Remix)" (with Little Mix)	Won	
IHeartRadio Music Awards	2018	Latin Song of the Year	"Hey DJ"	Nominated	
IHeartRadio Music Awards	2018	Best Boy Band	CNCO	Nominated	
IHeartRadio Music Awards	2018	Latin Artist of the Year	CNCO	Nominated	
IHeartRadio Music Awards	2021	Favorite Music Video Choreography	"Honey Boo" (with Natti Natasha)	Nominated	
Latin American Music Awards	2016	Xfinity New Artist of the Year	CNCO	Won	
Latin American Music Awards	2016	Favorite Pop/Rock Duo or Group	CNCO	Won	
Latin American Music Awards	2016	Favorite Pop/Rock New Artist	CNCO	Won	
Latin American Music Awards	2017	Favorite Pop/Rock Duo or Group	CNCO	Won	
Latin American Music Awards	2017	Favorite Pop/Rock Song	"Reggaeton Lento (Bailemos)"	Won	
Latin American Music Awards	2017	Favorite Pop Album	Primera Cita	Won	
Latin American Music Awards	2017	Album of the Year	Primera Cita	Won	
Latin American Music Awards	2018	Favorite Duo or Group	CNCO	Won	
Latin American Music Awards	2018	Favorite Pop Artist	CNCO	Won	
Latin American Music Awards	2018	Favorite Pop Album	CNCO	Won	
Latin American Music Awards	2019	Favorite Duo or Group	CNCO	Won	
Latin American Music Awards	2019	Favorite Pop Artist	CNCO	Won	
Latin American Music Awards	2022	Favorite Pop Album	Déjà Vu	Won	
Latin Grammy Awards	2017	Best New Artist	CNCO	Nominated	
Latin Italian Music Awards	2016	Best Latin Revelation of the Year	CNCO	Won	
Latin Italian Music Awards	2016	Artist Saga	CNCO	Won	
Latin Italian Music Awards	2016	Best Latin Male Album of The Year	Primera Cita	Won	
Latin Italian Music Awards	2016	Best Latin Fandom	CNCOwners	Won	
Latin Italian Music Awards	2017	Best Latin Group or Duo of the Year	CNCO	Won	
Latin Italian Music Awards	2017	Best Latin Concert in Italy of the Year	CNCO	Won	
Latin Italian Music Awards	2017	Best Latin Song of the Year	"Reggaetón Lento"	Won	
Latin Italian Music Awards	2017	Best Latin Collaboration of the Year	"Reggaetón Lento (Remix)" (with Little Mix)	Won	
Latin Italian Music Awards	2017	Best Latin Fandom	CNCOwners	Nominated	
Latin Italian Music Awards	2018	Best Latin Group or Duo of the Year	CNCO	Won	
Latin Italian Music Awards	2018	Best Latin Album of the Year	CNCO	Won	
Latin Italian Music Awards	2018	Best Latin Male Video of The Year	"Se Vuelve Loca"	Won	
Latin Italian Music Awards	2018	Best Song EuroLatino of The Year	"Dolor De Cabeza" (with Riki)	Won	
Latin Italian Music Awards	2019	Best Latin Duo/Group	CNCO	Won	
Latin Italian Music Awards	2019	Best Latin Concert in Italy	CNCO	Won	
Latin Italian Music Awards	2019	Best Latin Male Video	"De Cero"	Won	
Latin Italian Music Awards	2019	Best Latin Collaboration	"Me Vuelvo Loco" (with Abraham Mateo)	Won	
Latin Italian Music Awards	2019	Best Latin Choreography Video	"Me Vuelvo Loco" (with Abraham Mateo)	Won	
Latin Italian Music Awards	2020	Best Latin Duo/Group	CNCO	Won	
Latin Italian Music Awards	2020	Best Latin Challenge	"Honey Boo" (with Natti Natasha)	Won	
Latino Music Awards	2021	Pop Group of the Year	CNCO	Won	
Latino Music Awards	2021	Video Clip of the Year	"Honey Boo" (with Natti Natasha)	Nominated	
Latino Music Awards	2022	Group, Duo or Band of the Year	CNCO	Won	
Lo Nuestro Awards	2017	Pop/Rock Song of the Year	"Tan Fácil"	Won	
Lo Nuestro Awards	2017	Pop/Rock Group or Duo of the Year	CNCO	Won	
Lo Nuestro Awards	2017	Pop/Rock Album of the Year	Primera Cita	Won	
Lo Nuestro Awards	2019	Pop/Rock Group or Duo of the Year	CNCO	Won	
Lo Nuestro Awards	2019	Social Artist of the Year	CNCO	Nominated	
Lo Nuestro Awards	2020	Pop/Rock Group or Duo of the Year	CNCO	Won	
Lo Nuestro Awards	2020	Pop/Rock Song of the Year	"De Cero"	Nominated	
Lo Nuestro Awards	2021	Pop/Rock Group or Duo of the Year	CNCO	Won	
Lo Nuestro Awards	2021	Pop/Rock Album of the Year	Que Quiénes Somos	Nominated	
Lo Nuestro Awards	2021	Pop/Rock Collaboration of the Year	"Como Así" (with Lali)	Nominated	
Lo Nuestro Awards	2021	Urban/Pop Song of the Year	"Honey Boo" (with Natti Natasha)	Nominated	
Lo Nuestro Awards	2022	Pop/Rock Group or Duo of the Year	CNCO	Won	
Lo Nuestro Awards	2022	Pop/Rock Album of the Year	Déjà Vu	Won	
Lo Nuestro Awards	2022	Pop/Rock Song of the Year	"Tan Enamorados"	Won	
Lo Nuestro Awards	2023	Pop/Rock Group or Duo of the Year	CNCO	Won	
Lo Nuestro Awards	2023	Pop/Rock Album of the Year	XOXO	Nominated	
Lo Nuestro Awards	2023	Urban/Pop Song of the Year	"Toa La Noche"	Nominated	
Meus Prêmios Nick	2021	Favorite Music Group	CNCO	Nominated	
Meus Prêmios Nick	2021	Favorite International Hit	"Tan Enamorados"	Nominated	
Monitor Latino Music Awards	2021	Best Pop Song	"Tan Enamorados"	Nominated	
MTV Millennial Awards	2017	Hit of the Year	"Reggaetón Lento"	Won	
MTV Millennial Awards	2017	Best Pop Artist	CNCO	Nominated	
MTV Millennial Awards	2017	Best Performance in an App	CNCO	Nominated	
MTV Millennial Awards	2018	Fandom of the Year	CNCOwners	Nominated	
MTV Millennial Awards	2021	Fandom of the Year	CNCOwners	Nominated	
MTV Video Music Awards	2019	Push Artist of the Year	CNCO	Nominated	
MTV Video Music Awards	2019	Best Group	CNCO	Nominated	
MTV Video Music Awards	2020	Best Quarantine Performance	MTV Unplugged at Home	Won	
MTV Video Music Awards	2020	Best Group	CNCO	Nominated	
MTV Video Music Awards	2020	Best Choreography	"Honey Boo" (with Natti Natasha)	Nominated	
Nickelodeon Argentina Kids' Choice Awards	2017	Favorite Song	"Reggaeton Lento (Bailemos)"	Nominated	
Nickelodeon Argentina Kids' Choice Awards	2017	Favorite Collaboration	"Hey DJ" (with Yandel)	Nominated	
Nickelodeon Colombia Kids' Choice Awards	2017	Favorite Song	"Reggaeton Lento (Bailemos)"	Won	
Nickelodeon Colombia Kids' Choice Awards	2017	Favorite Collaboration	"Hey DJ" (with Yandel)	Nominated	
Nickelodeon Mexico Kids' Choice Awards	2017	Favorite Song	"Reggaeton Lento (Bailemos)"	Won	
Nickelodeon Mexico Kids' Choice Awards	2017	Favorite Collaboration	"Hey DJ" (with Yandel)	Nominated	
Nickelodeon Mexico Kids' Choice Awards	2018	Favorite Latin Artist or Group	CNCO	Won	
Nickelodeon Mexico Kids' Choice Awards	2018	Favorite Fandom	CNCOwners	Nominated	
Nickelodeon Mexico Kids' Choice Awards	2019	Favorite Fandom	CNCOwners	Nominated	
Nickelodeon Mexico Kids' Choice Awards	2020	Favorite Latin Artist or Group	CNCO	Won	
Nickelodeon Mexico Kids' Choice Awards	2020	Favorite Fandom	CNCOwners	Nominated	
Nickelodeon Mexico Kids' Choice Awards	2021	Top Latin Artist	CNCO	Won	
Nickelodeon Mexico Kids' Choice Awards	2021	Favorite Fandom	CNCOwners	Nominated	
People's Choice Awards	2018	The Latin Artist of 2018	CNCO	Won	
People's Choice Awards	2019	The Group of 2019	CNCO	Nominated	
People's Choice Awards	2020	The Group of 2020	CNCO	Nominated	
Premios Juventud	2016	Producer's Choice Award	CNCO	Won	
Premios Juventud	2016	Mi Artista Pop Rock	CNCO	Won	
Premios Juventud	2016	Mi Tuitero Favorito	CNCO	Won	
Premios Juventud	2016	Mejor Look	CNCO	Won	
Premios Juventud	2016	La Mas Pegajosa	"Tan Fácil"	Won	
Premios Juventud	2016	Mi "Fan Army" Favorito	CNCOwners	Won	
Premios Juventud	2016	Voz del Momento	CNCO	Nominated	
Premios Juventud	2017	Best Song For "Chillin"	"Reggaeton Lento (Bailemos)"	Won	
Premios Juventud	2019	Sick Dance Routine (Best Choreography)	"Pretend"	Nominated	
Premios Juventud	2019	Best Reality Show Break-Out Artist	CNCO	Nominated	
Premios Juventud	2020	Can't Get Enough Of This Song	"Pegao" (with Manuel Turizo)	Nominated	
Premios Juventud	2020	The Perfect Mix	"Pegao" (with Manuel Turizo)	Nominated	
Premios Juventud	2021	The Perfect Mix	"Honey Boo" (with Natti Natasha)	Nominated	
Premios Juventud	2021	Favorite Group or Duo of the Year	CNCO	Nominated	
Premios Juventud	2021	Album of the Year	Déja Vu	Nominated	
Premios Juventud	2022	Favorite Group or Duo of the Year	CNCO	Nominated	
Premios Juventud	2022	Best Fandom	CNCOwners	Won	
Premios Juventud	2023	Favorite Group or Duo of the Year	CNCO	Nominated	
Premios Juventud	2023	Best Pop Track	"La Equivocada"	Nominated	
Premios Juventud	2023	Best Pop Album	XOXO	Nominated	
Premios Tu Música Urbano	2019	Urban Artist Duo or Group	CNCO	Nominated	
Premios Tu Música Urbano	2019	Best Urban Song – International	"Si Vuelve Loca"	Nominated	
Premios Tu Música Urbano	2020	Top Group	CNCO	Won	
SESAC Latina Music Awards	2021	Award Winning Songs	"Pegao" (with Manuel Turizo)	Won	
Teen Choice Awards	2017	Choice Latin Artist	CNCO	Won	
Teen Choice Awards	2017	Choice Latin Song	"Reggaeton Lento (Bailemos)"	Nominated	
Teen Choice Awards	2017	Choice International Artist	CNCO	Nominated	
Teen Choice Awards	2018	Choice Latin Artist	CNCO	Won	
Teen Choice Awards	2018	Choice Latin Song	"Hey DJ" (with Yandel)	Nominated	
Teen Choice Awards	2018	Choice International Artist	CNCO	Nominated	
Teen Choice Awards	2018	Choice Fandom	CNCOwners	Nominated	
Teen Choice Awards	2019	Choice Latin Artist	CNCO	Won	
Teen Choice Awards	2019	Choice Latin Song	"Pretend"	Won	
Teen Choice Awards	2019	Choice Fandom	CNCOwners	Nominated	
Teen Choice Awards	2019	Choice International Artist	CNCO	Nominated	
Telehit Awards	2017	Video in Spanish Most Requested in Networks	"Hey DJ" (with Yandel)	Won	
The Pop Hub Awards	2018	Ulubiony Zespol Muzyczny (Favorite Music Band)	CNCO	Won	
The Pop Hub Awards	2019	Ulubiona Trasa Koncertowa (Favorite Concert Tour)	CNCO World Tour	Won	
The Pop Hub Awards	2019	Najlepsza Choreografia (Best Choreography)	"Pretend"	Nominated	
The Pop Hub Awards	2019	Ulubiona Gwiazda Latynoska (Favorite Latin Star)	CNCO	Nominated	
Tudo Information Awards	2018	Group of The Year	CNCO	Nominated	
Your World Awards	2017	Favorite Pop Artist	CNCO	Won	
Your World Awards	2017	Favorite Party-Starter Song	"Hey DJ" (with Yandel)	Won	
Your World Awards	2017	Favorite Fan Club	CNCOwners	Won	
