= CNCO discography =

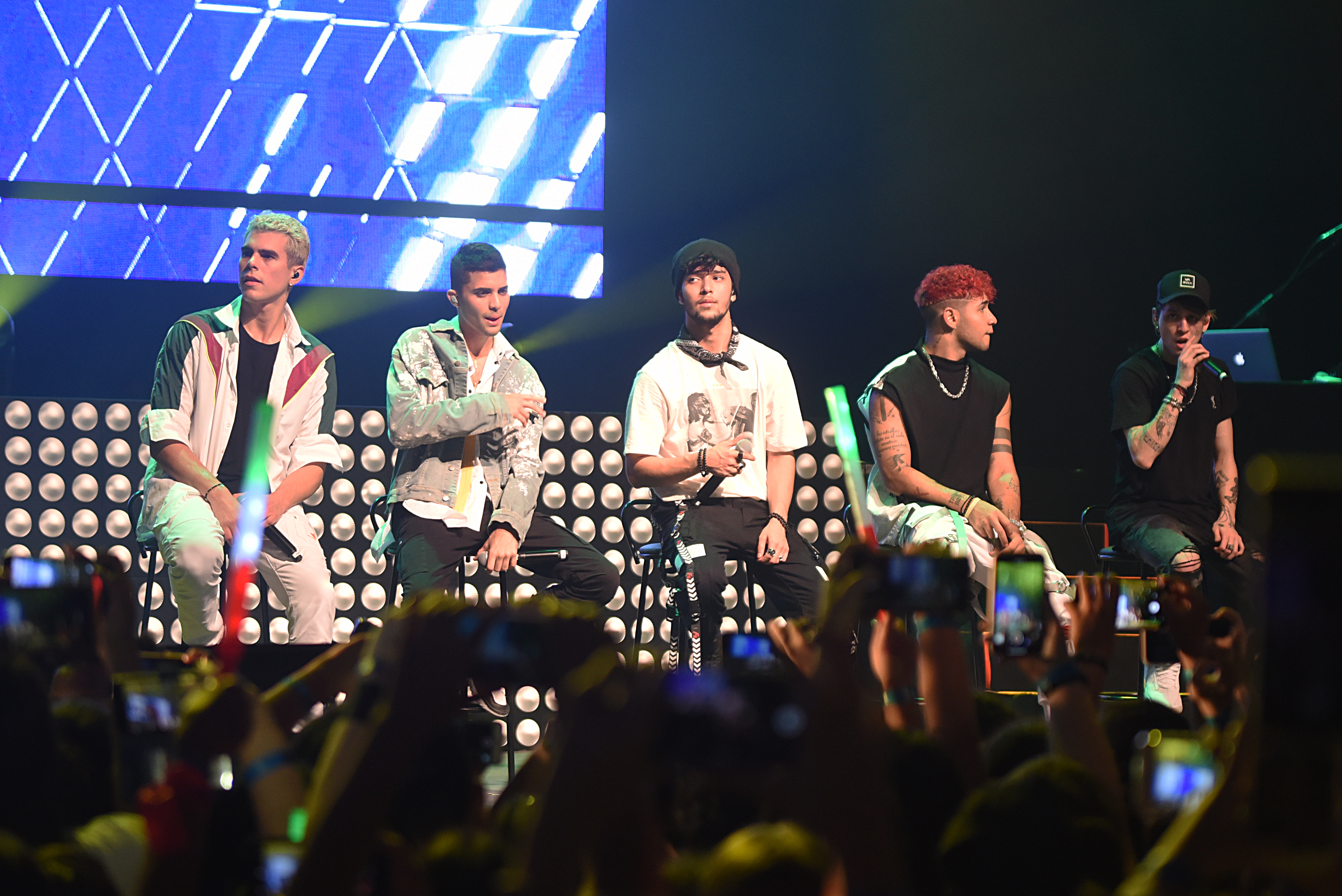
- CNCO in 2019 (L-R: Zabdiel, Erick Brian, Joel, Richard and Christopher)
- Studio albums: 4
- EPs: 3
- Live albums: 1
- Singles: 30
- Promotional singles: 6

Latin American boy band CNCO has released four studio albums, one live album, three extended plays, thirty singles, including eight as a featured artist, and six promotional singles. The group released their debut single "Tan Fácil" in January 2016, which peaked at number 23 on Billboard's Hot Latin Songs chart. Later in May, they released "Quisiera", which reached number 29 on the chart. The band released their anticipated debut album, Primera Cita, on August 26 of the same year, which achieved a Gold certification in the U.S. The group gained international recognition after the release of their third single "Reggaetón Lento (Bailemos)". It has been certified 5× platinum in the Latin field of the Recording Industry Association of America (RIAA), and its video reached over 1 billion views in less than a year, making them the first boyband to achieve the feat.

In April 2017, they released "Hey DJ", the lead single from their second album, featuring Yandel. Throughout the year they were featured in several singles and remixes from artists such as Río Roma and Becky G. Later in August, they collaborated with Little Mix on a remix of "Reggaetón Lento" released as the second single of the album, followed by "Mamita", released in October. The group released their self-titled album on April 6, 2018, accompanied by the fourth single "Sólo Yo". In July, they released "Se Vuelve Loca" as the fifth single from the album. The band released "Llegaste Tú", with Dominican-American singer Prince Royce in October, followed a month later by a remix of "Hey DJ", featuring American singer-songwriter Meghan Trainor and Jamaican artist Sean Paul. They released their first Spanglish solo single, "Pretend", on February 15, 2019. The group dropped "De Cero" in June as the lead single of their first EP, Que Quiénes Somos, which was released on August 11, 2019. In 2020, they released two singles, and "Honey Boo" with Natti Natasha and "Beso". In November, they began the era of Déjà Vu, a cover and visual album of Latin pop classics recorded during quarantine due to the COVID-19 pandemic, with five official singles released from that month to February 2021. Following Joel Pimentel's departure in May 2021, they released their first song as quartet, "To'a la Noche" in August.

In January 2022, the group released "Party, Humo & Alcohol", their second song as a foursome, and in April, they released "La Equivocada", produced by Latin Grammy winner Edgar Barrera.

In September, while accepting the award for "Best Fandom" at the Premios Juventud ceremony, member Zabdiel de Jesús announced that the group would be disbanding in a year and a half. Their last album XOXO was released on August 26, the anniversary of their debut. The album includes singles released beforehand, such as “Plutón” with Kenia OS and “La Equivocada (Tumbado Version)” with Adriel Favela. The boyband will go on one final tour before their disbandment.

== Albums ==
=== Studio albums ===
List of studio albums, with selected details, chart positions, sales, and certifications
Title	Studio album details	Peak chart positions									Sales	Certifications
Title	Studio album details	US	US Latin	ARG	ITA	MEX	POR	SPA	SWI	URU	Sales	Certifications
Primera Cita	Released: August 26, 2016; Label: Sony Music Latin; Formats: CD, digital download, streaming	39	1	1	—	15	22	24	—	4	US: 57,000 (Note: Sales of Primera Cita in the United States as of July 2017.)	AMPROFON: Platinum+Gold; ASINCOL: Gold; RIAA: Gold (Latin)
CNCO	Released: April 6, 2018; Label: Sony Latin; Formats: CD, digital download, streaming	33	1	1	30	2	11	3	76	10	US: 62,000 (Note: Sales of CNCO in the United States as of June 28, 2018.)	AMPROFON: Gold; CAPIF: Gold; RIAA: Platinum (Latin); IFPI Peru: Platinum
Déjà Vu	Released: February 5, 2021; Label: Sony Latin; Formats: CD, digital download, streaming	—	19	—	—	—	—	33	98	—		
XOXO	Released: August 26, 2022; Label: Sony Latin	—	—	—	—	—	—	—	—	—		
"—" denotes a recording that did not chart or was not released in that territory.

=== Live albums ===
List of live albums, with selected details
Title	Live album details
Déjà Vu Live	Release date: July 2, 2021; Label: Sony Latin; Formats: CD, digital download, streaming

== Extended plays ==
List of extended plays with details and chart positions
Title	Details	Peaks		Certifications
Title	Details	US Latin	ARG	Certifications
Que Quiénes Somos	Released: October 11, 2019; Label: Sony Latin; Formats: CD, digital download, streaming; Tracklist: 1. "De Cero"; 2. "Pegao"; 3. "Qué Va a Ser de Mí"; 4. "La Ley"; 5. "Ya Tú Sabes"; 6. "De Mí"; 7. "Tóxica"	12	8	AMPROFON: Gold; RIAA: Gold (Latin)
Spotify Singles	Released: December 4, 2019; Label: Sony Latin; Formats: digital download, streaming; Tracklist: 1. "bad guy"; 2. "Primera Cita"	—	—	
Que Quiénes Somos (Japan Edition)	Released: February 12, 2020; Label: Sony Latin; Formats: CD, digital download, streaming; Tracklist: 1. "My Boo"; 9. "Pretend"; 10. "Hey DJ (Remix)"; 11. "Llegaste Tú"	—	—	

== Singles ==
=== As lead artist ===
List of singles as lead artist, with selected chart positions and certifications, showing year released and album name
Title	Year	Peak chart positions										Certifications	Album
Title	Year	US	US Latin	US Latin Pop	ARG	COL	ITA	MEX	SPA	SWI	UK	Certifications	Album
"Tan Fácil" (solo or featuring Wisin)	2016	—	5	2	—	—	—	41	76	—	—	RIAA: 3× Platinum (Latin); AMPROFON: Platinum; PROMUSICAE: Gold	Primera Cita
"Quisiera"	2016	—	26	9	—	—	—	44	—	—	—	RIAA: 2× Platinum (Latin); AMPROFON: Gold	Primera Cita
"Reggaetón Lento (Bailemos)"	2016	— (Note: "Reggaeton Lento (Bailemos)" did not enter the Billboard Hot 100, but peaked at No. 11 on the Bubbling Under Hot 100 Singles chart.)	6	1	2	6	55	1	2	—	—	RIAA: 5× Platinum (Latin); AMPROFON: Diamond+2× Platinum; CAPIF: Platinum; FIMI: Platinum; PROMUSICAE: 6× Platinum; MC: Platinum	Primera Cita
"Para Enamorarte"	2016	—	— (Note: "Para Enamorarte" did not enter the Billboard Hot Latin Songs, but peaked at No. 23 on the Latin Digital Song Sales chart.)	—	— (Note: "Para Enamorarte" did not enter the Monitor Latino Argentine Top 20, but peaked at No. 18 on the Argentine Latin Airplay chart.)	—	—	—	—	—	—	RIAA: Gold (Latin); AMPROFON: Gold	Primera Cita
"Hey DJ" (solo or with Yandel)	2017	—	14	3	3	33	—	3	6	—	—	RIAA: 7× Platinum (Latin); AMPROFON: Diamond+Platinum; CAPIF: 2× Platinum; FIMI: Gold; PROMUSICAE: 3× Platinum	CNCO
"Reggaetón Lento (Remix)" (with Little Mix)	2017	— (Note: "Reggaeton Lento (Remix)" did not enter the Billboard Hot 100, but peaked at No. 3 on the Bubbling Under Hot 100 Singles chart.)	16	—	— (Note: "Reggaeton Lento (Remix) did not enter the Monitor Latino Argentine Top 20, but peaked at No. 15 on the Argentine Anglo Airplay chart.)	—	32	— (Note: "Reggaeton Lento (Remix)" did not enter the Billboard Mexico Airplay chart, but peaked at No. 11 on the Mexico Ingles Airplay chart.)	14	18	5	AFP: Gold; AMPROFON: Gold; ARIA: Gold; BEA: Gold; BPI: Platinum; FIMI: 3× Platinum; IFPI SWI: Platinum; NVPI: 2× Platinum; PMB: 3× Platinum; ZPAV: Gold	CNCO and Glory Days: The Platinum Edition
"Mamita"	2017	—	28	15	5	—	—	27	81	—	—	RIAA: Gold (Latin); AMPROFON: 2× Platinum	CNCO
"Sólo Yo"	2018	—	48	15	3	—	—	21	—	—	—		CNCO
"Se Vuelve Loca"	2018	—	19	1	22	15	—	1	—	81	—	RIAA: 4× Platinum (Latin); AMPROFON: Gold	CNCO
"Díganle (Remix)" (with Leslie Grace and Becky G)	2018	—	36	30	34	—	—	—	—	—	—	RIAA: 2× Platinum (Latin)	Non-album single
"Llegaste Tú" (with Prince Royce)	2018	—	26	4	21	—	—	40	—	—	—	RIAA: 5× Platinum (Latin); AMPROFON: Gold; IFPI PER: Platinum+Gold	Que Quienes Somos (Japan Edition)
"Hey DJ (Remix)" (with Meghan Trainor and Sean Paul)	2018	—	— (Note: "Hey DJ (Remix)" did not enter the Billboard Hot Latin Songs, but peaked at No. 15 on the Latin Digital Song Sales chart.)	—	—	—	—	— (Note: "Hey DJ (Remix)" did not enter the Billboard Mexico Airplay chart, but peaked at No. 24 on the Mexico Espanol Airplay chart.)	—	95	—	FIMI: Platinum	Que Quienes Somos (Japan Edition)
"Pretend"	2019	—	31	—	40	79	—	14	—	—	—	AMPROFON: Gold	Que Quienes Somos (Japan Edition)
"De Cero"	2019	—	— (Note: "De Cero" did not enter the Billboard Hot Latin Songs, but peaked at No. 17 on the Latin Digital Song Sales chart.)	21	35	83	—	17	—	—	—	RIAA: Platinum (Latin)	Que Quiénes Somos
"Me Vuelvo Loco" (with Abraham Mateo)	2019	—	— (Note: "Me Vuelvo Loco" did not enter the Billboard Hot Latin Songs, but peaked at No. 16 on the Latin Digital Song Sales chart.)	—	61	—	—	—	—	—	—	RIAA: Gold (Latin)	Sigo a lo Mío
"Pegao" (with Manuel Turizo)	2019	—	— (Note: "Pegao" did not enter the Billboard Hot Latin Songs, but peaked at No. 19 on the Latin Digital Song Sales chart.)	12	66	92	—	—	—	—	—	RIAA: Platinum (Latin)	Que Quiénes Somos
"Me Necesita" (with PrettyMuch)	2019	—	34	—	—	—	—	—	—	—	—		INTL:EP
"Honey Boo" (with Natti Natasha)	2020	—	— (Note: "Honey Boo" did not enter the Billboard Hot Latin Songs, but peaked at No. 8 on the Latin Digital Song Sales chart.)	10	62	—	—	—	—	—	—		Non-album singles
"Beso"	2020	—	— (Note: "Beso" did not enter the Billboard Hot Latin Songs, but peaked at No. 4 on the Latin Digital Song Sales chart.)	12	53	17	—	43	—	—	—		Non-album singles
"Tan Enamorados"	2020	—	49	7	23	9	—	1	—	—	—	RIAA: Gold (Latin)	Déjà Vu
"Dejaría Todo"	2021	—	—	—	34	22	—	—	—	—	—		Déjà Vu
"Toa La Noche"	2021	—	—	6	58	67	—	—	—	—	—		XOXO
"Pa Que Guaye" (with Alex Rose)	2021	—	—	24	—	—	—	—	—	—	—		Non-album single
"Party, Humo y Alcohol"	2022	—	—	—	73	—	—	—	—	—	—		XOXO
"La Equivocada"	2022	—	—	13	88	—	—	—	—	—	—		XOXO
"Suelta, Sola y Tranquila" (Remix) (with Fabro and MYA)	2022	—	—	—	—	—	—	—	—	—	—		Non-album single
"No Apagues la Luz"	2022	—	—	—	—	—	—	—	—	—	—		XOXO
"La Equivocada (Versión Tumbao)" (with Adriel Favela)	2022	—	—	—	—	—	—	—	—	—	—		XOXO
"Plutón" (with Kenia Os)	2022	—	—	—	—	—	—	—	—	—	—		XOXO
"Ferrari" (with Nacho)	2022	—	—	—	—	—	—	—	—	—	—		Non-album singles
"Estrella" (with Alejo)	2022	—	—	—	—	—	—	—	—	—	—		Non-album singles
"Ay Dios"	2022	—	—	—	—	—	—	—	—	—	—		Non-album singles
"Diferente" (with Steve Aoki)	2023	—	—	—	—	—	—	—	—	—	—		Hiroquest 2: Double Helix
"Extraños" (with Gera Demara)	2023	—	—	—	—	—	—	—	—	—	—		Non-album singles
"La Ultima Canción"	2023	—	—	—	—	—	—	—	—	—	—		Non-album singles
"Tu Me Elevas" (with Aron Luix)	2023	—	—	—	—	—	—	—	—	—	—		Non-album singles
"Para Siempre" (with cast of 4Ever)	2023	—	—	—	—	—	—	—	—	—	—		4Ever
"Fuego" (with cast of 4Ever)		—	—	—	—	—	—	—	—	—	—		4Ever
"—" denotes a recording that did not chart or was not released in that territory.

=== As featured artist ===
List of singles as featured artist with selected chart positions
Title	Year	Peak chart positions										Certifications	Album
Title	Year	ARG	CHI Pop	ECU	GUA	ITA	MEX	PAR	PER Pop	SPA	URU	Certifications	Album
"Ahora Lloras Tú" (Ana Mena featuring CNCO)	2017	—	—	—	—	—	—	—	—	78	—	PROMUSICAE: Gold	Index
"Princesa" (Río Roma featuring CNCO)	2017	— (Note: "Princesa" did not enter the Billboard Argentina Hot 100, but peaked at No. 14 on the Argentina Monitor Latino Argentina Latin Airplay chart.)	—	6	6	—	11	—	—	—	9	AMPROFON: Platinum	Eres la Persona Correcta en el Momento Equivocado
"Dolor de cabeza" (Riki featuring CNCO)	2018	90	—	—	—	43	—	—	—	—	—		Live & Summer Mania
"Quisiera Alejarme (Remix)" (Wisin featuring Ozuna and CNCO)	2018	—	—	—	—	—	—	—	—	—	—	AMPROFON: Gold	Non-album singles
"24 Horas" (Pinto Wahin featuring CNCO)	2019	97	—	—	—	—	—	—	—	—	—		Non-album singles
"Como Así" (Lali featuring CNCO)	2019	33	12	— (Note: "Como Así" did not enter the National-Report Ecuador Top 100 singles chart, but peaked at No. 14 on the Monitor Latino Ecuador Pop Airplay chart.)	—	—	—	78	15	—	— (Note: "Como Así" did not enter the Monitor Latino Uruguay Ariplay chart, but peaked at No. 15 on the Uruguay Airplay Latin chart.)		Libra
"Cinturita (Remix)" (Reggi El Autentico featuring CNCO)	2021	—	—	—	—	—	—	—	—	—	—		Non-album singles
"MUSIKITA" (Reggi El Autentico featuring CNCO)	2022	—	—	—	—	—	—	—	—	—	—		Non-album singles
"—" denotes a recording that did not chart or was not released in that territory.

=== Promotional singles ===
List of promotional singles
Title	Year	Peak chart positions					Certifications	Album
Title	Year	US Latin Digital	BOL	MEX Esp.	PAN Pop	RD Pop	Certifications	Album
"Cien"	2016	—	—	—	—	—	RIAA: Gold (Latin)	Primera Cita
"Mi Medicina"	2018	16	13	19	8	8	RIAA: Gold (Latin)	CNCO
"Bonita"	2018	—	—	—	—	—		CNCO
"Fiesta en Mi Casa"	2018	—	—	—	—	—		CNCO
"Ya Tú Sabes"	2019	—	—	—	—	—		Que Quiénes Somos
"La Ley"	2019	—	—	—	—	—		Que Quiénes Somos
"My Boo"	2020	—	—	—	—	—		Que Quiénes Somos (Japan Edition)
"Mis Ojos Lloran por Ti"	2020	—	—	—	—	—		Déjà Vu
"Hero"	2020	—	—	—	—	—		Déjà Vu
"Solo Importas Tú"	2021	—	—	—	—	—		Déjà Vu
"Un Beso"	2021	—	—	—	—	—		Déjà Vu
"Entra en Mi Vida"	2021	—	—	—	—	—		Déjà Vu
"—" denotes a recording that did not chart or was not released in that territory.

== Guest appearances ==
List of non-single guest appearances
Title	Year	Other artist(s)	Album
"Casi Nada (Nando Pro Remix)"	2016	Karol G	None
"Todo Cambió" (Remix) (Note: "Todo Cambio (Remix)" charted at number 94 in Spain.)	2017	Becky G	None
"Súbeme La Radio" (Remix)	2017	Enrique Iglesias, Descemer Bueno	None
"Mal di testa"	2018	Riki	Live & Summer Mania
"TETEO"	2022	Maffio	Eso Es Mental
"Vivir Sin Ti"	2023	Mau y Ricky	Desgenerados Mixtape
