= Zabdiel =

Puerto Rican singer, songwriter, and producer (born 1997)

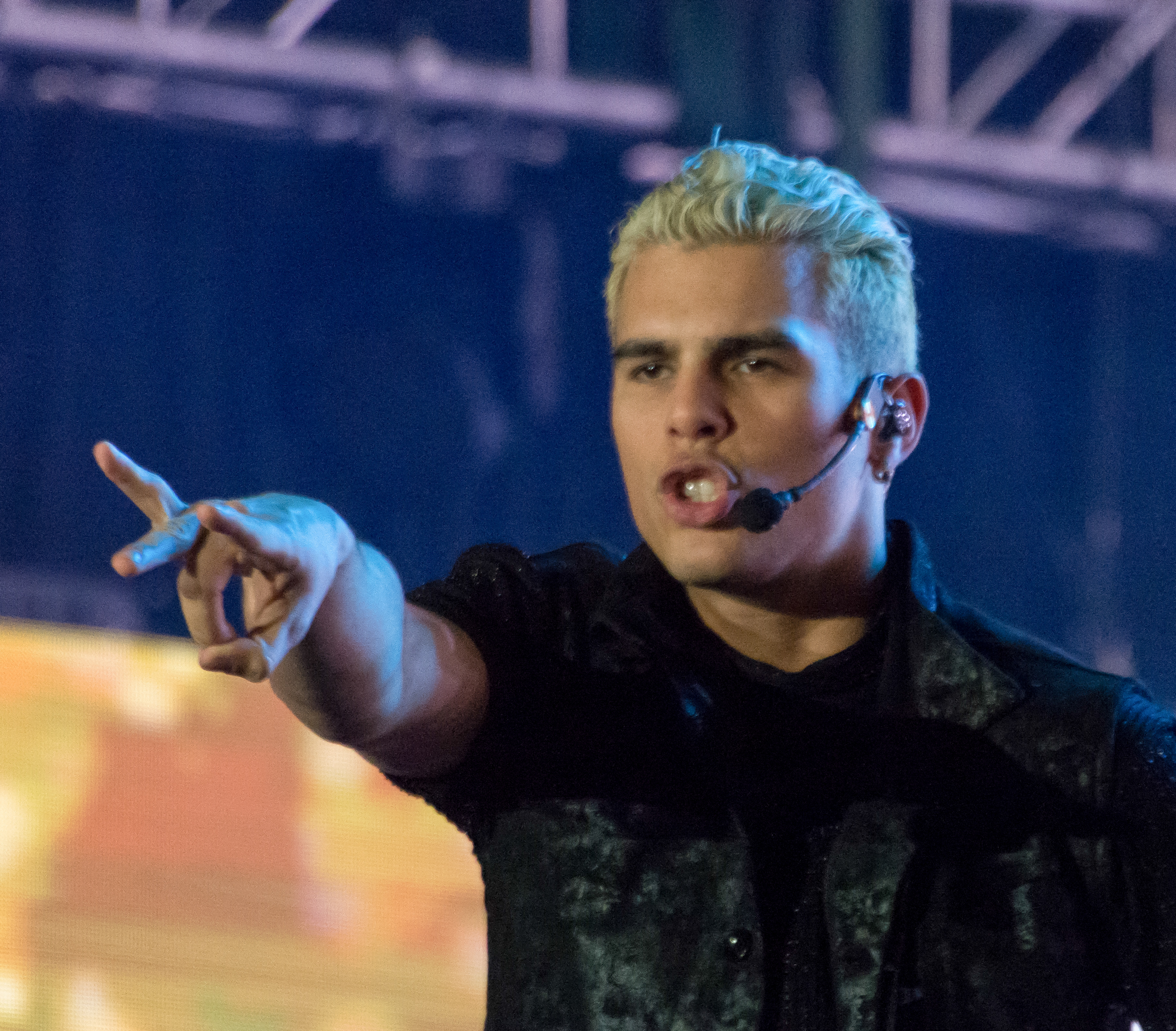
- Zabdiel performing in 2020.
- Born: Zabdiel de Jesús Colón; December 13, 1997 (age 28); Bayamón, Puerto Rico, US
- Other name: Zabdiel de Jesús
- Occupations: Singer; songwriter; record producer
- Years active: 2015–present
- Musical career
- Genre: Latin pop
- Instruments: Vocals; guitar
- Labels: Sony Music Latin; WK Entertainment
- Formerly of: CNCO

Zabdiel de Jesús Colón (born December 13, 1997), known mononymously as Zabdiel (stylized in all caps) is a Puerto Rican singer, songwriter and producer. He was a member of Latin boyband CNCO from its inception in December 2015 until its dissolvement in November 2023. His solo debut single, "Aventura" with Spanish singer Ana Mena, was released in August 2023.

== Life and career ==
=== 1997–2014: Early life ===
Zabdiel De Jesús Colón was born on December 13, 1997, in Bayamón, Puerto Rico, to parents Noemi Colόn Gandía and Carlos "Charlie" De Jesús. He has a younger brother named Xavier. Zabdiel grew a passion for music thanks to his father, who taught him how to play the guitar at a young age. He formed a salsa and hip-hop group with friends in middle school, and studied ballet at La Escuela de Bellas Artes in the city.

=== 2015–2023: La Banda and CNCO ===
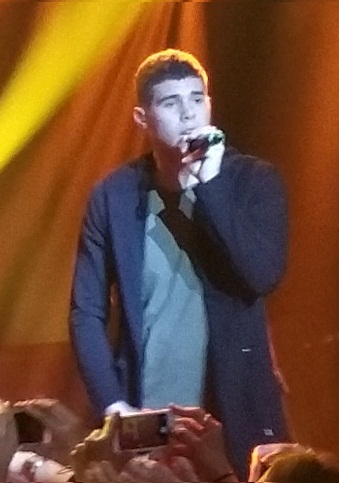
Zabdiel during CNCO's debut concert in Florida in January 2016.

On September 13, 2015, Zabdiel auditioned for the first season of La Banda, a Spanish-language competition series based in the mainland United States. The judge panel was formed by fellow Puerto Rican artist Ricky Martin, Italian singer-songwriter Laura Pausini, and Spanish musician Alejandro Sanz. Zabdiel gained notoriety after his audition, which received a 90% acceptance rate and allowed him to move on to the next round. During the show, Zabdiel performed the following songs as a soloist: "Mientes" (Camila), "A Thousand Years" (Christina Perri), "Ginza" (J Balvin), "Volví a Nacer" (Carlos Vives), "Coleccionista de Canciones" (Camila), "Aunque Ahora Estes con Él" (Calibre 50), and "Salomé" (Chayanne). The contestants performed in judge-formed bands, singing several Spanish and English songs from established artists.

On the show's finale, which took place on December 13, Zabdiel was one of the five boys chosen to form the band, alongside Christopher Velez, Richard Camacho, Joel Pimentel, and Erick Brian Colón, with the group's name announced as CNCO. The band won a five-year recording contract with Sony Music Latin, with Martin serving as their representative and Wisin producing their first album. Following the announcement, they performed the song "Devuélveme Mi Corazón", which they sang again at Times Square in New York City for Univision's Feliz 2016 New Year's celebration.

CNCO's first two albums, Primera Cita and CNCO, were released in August 2016 and April 2018, topping the Top Latin Albums chart in the U.S. Their respective singles "Reggaetón Lento (Bailemos)", and "Hey DJ" with Puerto Rican singer Yandel, peaked within the top 20 of Latin American countries and the Hot Latin Songs chart. The band's EP, Qué Quiénes Somos, was released in October 2019 and debuted within the top 15 of the Top Latin Albums chart. Déjà Vu, their third studio album, and last with member Joel, was released in February 2021. In July 2022, the group's separation was announced by Zabdiel at the Premios Juventud ceremony of that year while accepting the award for Best Fandom. Their final album XOXO was released in August 2023. The band went on their farewell La Última Cita tour, disbanding after their last show on November 17, 2023, in Puerto Rico.

=== 2021–present: Solo career and songwriting ===
Zabdiel co-wrote "Buscando Amor", the second track of the Spanish-language debut EP Revelación from American singer Selena Gomez, released on March 12, 2021. He also co-wrote "Aún Te Quiero" by Mexican singer Danna, released on November 23, 2023, as the fourth single from her seventh studio album CHILDSTAR.

On August 16, 2023, Zabdiel released a spoken word/instrumental audio on streaming platforms, called "Intro", in which he states: "[...] this is going to be my space to share my art, my music with you / What I have been visualizing for years, the thousands of ideas that filled my mind / And now you're going to be a part of it". Eight days later, on August 24, Zabdiel released his solo debut single "Aventura" with Spanish singer Ana Mena. The song is a cover of the 2006 Bachata single "Tengo Un Amor" by Toby Love, and Zabdiel and Ana Mena had previously collaborated on her CNCO-assisted single "Ahora Lloras Tú" in 2017 for her album Index. On September 28, he released the song "Película" with singers Mar Lucas and Seven Kayne. He appeared on the single "Sirena" by Ecuadorian singer Blanko, released on October 20. Due to little to no promotion, the songs failed to appear in any chart, although "Aventura" has managed to accumulate over one million views on YouTube.

== Personal life ==
On November 8, 2022, Zabdiel revealed that he had a daughter (born on November 5) by posting a video on his Instagram account. The mother is singer Talitha Ghetti, and she was named Luz De Jesús. However, on March 2, 2023, Zabdiel again took to Instagram to announce that he was not the father of the child, but gave no explanations as to how he found out.

== Discography ==
=== As lead artist ===
List of singles as lead artist, with selected chart positions
Title	Year	Peak chart positions			Album
Title	Year	US Latin	MEX	SPA	Album
"AVENTURA" (with Ana Mena)	2023	—	—	—	Non-album singles
"PELÍCULA" (with Mar Lucas and Seven Kayne)	2023	—	—	—	Non-album singles
"SIRENA" (with BLANKO)	2023	—	—	—	Non-album singles
"Chulería" (with Chesco)	2024	—	—	—	Non-album singles

=== Promotional singles ===
List of singles as lead artist, with selected chart positions
Title	Year	Peak chart positions			Album
Title	Year	US Latin	MEX	SPA	Album
"INTRO"	2023	—	—	—	Non-album promotional single

=== Music videos ===
List of music videos as lead artist, showing year released and directors
Title	Year	Other artist(s)	Director(s)	Ref.
"AVENTURA"	2023	Ana Mena	Unknown	
"PELÍCULA"	2023	Mar Lucas and Seven Kayne	Unknown	
"SIRENA"	2023	BLANKO	Unknown	
"CHULERÍA"	2024	Chesca	Unknown	

=== Songwriting credits ===
List of songwriting credits, with artists, showing year released and album name
Title	Year	Artist(s)	Album	Credits
"Buscando Amor"	2021	Selena Gomez	Revelación	Co-writer
"AÚN TE QUIERO"	2023	Danna Paola	CHILDSTAR	Co-writer
