= CNCO (disambiguation) =

CNCO are a Latin American boy band.

CNCO may also refer to:

- CNCO (album), their 2018 studio album
- China Navigation Company (CNCo), a merchant shipping company
