= 2018 iHeartRadio Music Awards =

Annual US music awards ceremony

- Date: March 11, 2018
- Location: The Forum, Inglewood
- Country: United States
- Hosted by: DJ Khaled and Hailey Baldwin
- Most awards: Ed Sheeran (4)
- Most nominations: Luis Fonsi and Daddy Yankee (7 each)

Television/radio coverage
- Network: TBS, TNT, and truTV
- Runtime: 96 minutes

The 2018 iHeartRadio Music Awards were held on March 11, 2018, at The Forum in Inglewood, California. The list of nominations was announced on January 10, 2018. DJ Khaled and Hailey Baldwin hosted the ceremony. TBS, TNT, and truTV broadcast the ceremony in the United States, while the red carpet was broadcast live on the network's social media pages. The telecast aired following the 2018 NCAA Selection Show on TBS. Taylor Swift premiered the music video for her single "Delicate" at the show. 2018 marked the show's final simulcast on TBS, TNT, and truTV, as it returned to broadcast television the following year, and aired on new partner network FOX for the first time.

== Performances ==
The following performed at the show:

Artist(s)	Song(s)
Cardi B G-Eazy	"Bartier Cardi" "MotorSport" "No Limit" "Finesse" "Bodak Yellow"
Ed Sheeran	"Perfect" (live from Melbourne, Australia)
Camila Cabello; Young Thug	"Havana"
Maroon 5	"Wait"
Eminem; Kehlani	"Nowhere Fast"
Bon Jovi	"It's My Life" "You Give Love a Bad Name"
Charlie Puth	"How Long"
N.E.R.D	"Lemon"

== Winners and nominees ==
iHeartRadio presented the winners of seven categories in the seven days leading up to the Sunday telecast. Winners are highlighted in boldface.

Song of the Year (presented by Jenna Dewan and Eve)	Female Artist of the Year (presented by Dustin Lynch and Isla Fisher)
**"Shape of You" – Ed Sheeran**; "Despacito" – Luis Fonsi and Daddy Yankee featuring Justin Bieber; "Something Just like This" – The Chainsmokers and Coldplay; "That's What I Like" – Bruno Mars; "Wild Thoughts" – DJ Khaled featuring Rihanna and Bryson Tiller	**Taylor Swift**; Alessia Cara; Halsey; P!nk; Rihanna
Male Artist of the Year	Best New Artist (presented by The Chainsmokers)
**Ed Sheeran**; Bruno Mars; Shawn Mendes; Charlie Puth; The Weeknd	**Cardi B**; Niall Horan; Luke Combs; Christian Nodal; Judah & the Lion; Ozuna; Khalid
Best Duo/Group of the Year	Album of the Year (per genre)
**Maroon 5**; The Chainsmokers; Imagine Dragons; Migos; Portugal. The Man	Pop: **÷ – Ed Sheeran**; Rock: **One More Light – Linkin Park**; Alternative Rock: **Evolve – Imagine Dragons**; Country: **From A Room: Volume 1 – Chris Stapleton**; Dance: **Memories...Do Not Open – The Chainsmokers**; Hip-Hop: **Damn – Kendrick Lamar**; R&B: **American Teen – Khalid**; Latin: **El Dorado – Shakira**
Best Collaboration (presented by Rita Ora and Bebe Rexha)	Best New Pop Artist
**"Something Just Like This" – The Chainsmokers and Coldplay**; "Despacito" – Luis Fonsi and Daddy Yankee featuring Justin Bieber; "Don't Wanna Know" – Maroon 5 featuring Kendrick Lamar; "Stay" – Zedd and Alessia Cara; "Wild Thoughts" – DJ Khaled featuring Rihanna and Bryson Tiller	**Niall Horan**; Camila Cabello; Logic; Julia Michaels; Liam Payne
Alternative Rock Song of the Year	Alternative Rock Artist of the Year
**"Feel It Still" – Portugal. The Man**; "Believer" – Imagine Dragons; "Thunder" – Imagine Dragons; "Walk on Water" – Thirty Seconds To Mars; "Wish I Knew You" – The Revivalists	**Imagine Dragons**; Cage The Elephant; Judah & the Lion; Kings of Leon; Portugal. The Man
Best New Rock/Alternative Rock Artist	Rock Song of the Year
**Judah & the Lion**; Greta Van Fleet; K.Flay; Rag'n'Bone Man; The Revivalists	**"Run" – Foo Fighters**; "Go to War" – Nothing More; "Help" – Papa Roach; "Rx (Medicate)" – Theory of a Deadman; "Song #3" – Stone Sour
Rock Artist of the Year	Country Song of the Year
**Metallica**; Foo Fighters; Highly Suspect; Papa Roach; Royal Blood	**"Body Like A Back Road" – Sam Hunt**; "Dirt on My Boots" – Jon Pardi; "Hurricane" – Luke Combs; "Small Town Boy" – Dustin Lynch; "Unforgettable" – Thomas Rhett
Country Artist of the Year	Best New Country Artist
**Thomas Rhett**; Jason Aldean; Luke Bryan; Sam Hunt; Blake Shelton	**Luke Combs**; Lauren Alaina; Kane Brown; Jon Pardi; Brett Young
Dance Song of the Year	Dance Artist of the Year
**"Stay" – Zedd and Alessia Cara**; "It Ain't Me" – Kygo and Selena Gomez; "No Promises" – Cheat Codes featuring Demi Lovato; "Rockabye" – Clean Bandit and Anne-Marie featuring Sean Paul; "Something Just Like This" – The Chainsmokers and Coldplay	**The Chainsmokers**; Calvin Harris; Cheat Codes; Kygo; Zedd
Hip-Hop Song of the Year (presented by Sean "Diddy" Combs and Christian Combs)	Hip-Hop Artist of the Year
**"Wild Thoughts" – DJ Khaled featuring Rihanna and Bryson Tiller**; "Bad and Boujee" – Migos featuring Lil Uzi Vert; "Bodak Yellow" – Cardi B; "Humble" – Kendrick Lamar; "Rockstar" – Post Malone featuring 21 Savage	**Kendrick Lamar**; DJ Khaled; Drake; Future; Migos
Best New Hip-Hop Artist	R&B Song of the Year
**Cardi B**; 21 Savage; GoldLink; Lil Uzi Vert; Playboi Carti	**"That's What I Like" – Bruno Mars**; "B.E.D." – Jacquees; "Location" – Khalid; "Love Galore" – SZA featuring Travis Scott; "Redbone" – Childish Gambino
R&B Artist of the Year	Best New R&B Artist
**Bruno Mars**; Khalid; Childish Gambino; Rihanna; The Weeknd	**Khalid**; 6LACK; Kehlani; Kevin Ross; SZA
Latin Song of the Year	Latin Artist of the Year
'**"Despacito" – Luis Fonsi and Daddy Yankee**; "El Amante" – Nicky Jam; "Hey DJ" – CNCO; "Mi Gente" – J Balvin featuring Willy William; "Súbeme la Radio" – Enrique Iglesias	**Luis Fonsi**; CNCO; J Balvin; Nicky Jam; Shakira
Best New Latin Artist	Regional Mexican Song of the Year
**Ozuna**; Abraham Mateo; Bad Bunny; Karol G; Danny Ocean	**"Adiós Amor" – Christian Nodal**; "Ella Es Mi Mujer" – Banda Carnaval; "Las Ultras" – Calibre 50; "Regresa Hermosa" – Gerardo Ortiz; "Siempre Te Voy A Querer" – Calibre 50
Regional Mexican Artist of the Year	Best New Regional Mexican Artist
**Calibre 50**; Banda Carnaval; Banda Los Recoditos; Banda Sinaloense MS de Sergio Lizarraga; Gerardo Ortiz	**Christian Nodal**; Edwin Luna y La Trakalosa de Monterrey; El Fantasma; Ulices Chaidez y Sus Plebes
Producer of the Year	Best Lyrics
**Andrew Watt**; Benny Blanco; Andrew "Pop" Wansel and Warren "Oak" Felder; Steve Mac; Justin Tranter	**"Slow Hands" - Niall Horan**; "Bodak Yellow" – Cardi B; "Despacito" – Luis Fonsi and Daddy Yankee; "There's Nothing Holdin' Me Back" – Shawn Mendes; "Look What You Made Me Do" – Taylor Swift; "Perfect" – Ed Sheeran
Best Cover Song	Best Fan Army
**"The Chain" – Harry Styles**; "All We Got" – Shawn Mendes; "Bad Liar" – HAIM; "Issues" – Niall Horan; "Lost" – Khalid; "Say You Won't Let Go" – Camila Cabello and Machine Gun Kelly; "Touch" – Ed Sheeran; "The Tribute Song" – Thirty Seconds To Mars	**BTS A.R.M.Y. - BTS**; Arianators - Ariana Grande; Beliebers - Justin Bieber; Camilizers - Camila Cabello; EXO-L - EXO; Harmonizers - Fifth Harmony; Lovatics - Demi Lovato; Mendes Army - Shawn Mendes; Mixers - Little Mix; Selenators - Selena Gomez; Smilers - Miley Cyrus; Swifties - Taylor Swift
Best Music Video	Social Star Award
**"Sign of the Times" - Harry Styles**; "Bad Liar" - Selena Gomez; "Bodak Yellow" - Cardi B; "Despacito" - Luis Fonsi and Daddy Yankee; "I'm the One" - DJ Khaled featuring Justin Bieber, Quavo, Chance the Rapper and Lil Wayne; "Look What You Made Me Do" - Taylor Swift; "Malibu" - Miley Cyrus; "New Rules" - Dua Lipa; "Shape of You" - Ed Sheeran; "Sorry Not Sorry" - Demi Lovato; "Swish Swish" - Katy Perry featuring Nicki Minaj; "That's What I Like" - Bruno Mars; "There's Nothing Holdin' Me Back" - Shawn Mendes	**Anitta**; Christian Collins; dodie; Andrew Huang; Conor Maynard; Gabbie Hanna; JoJo Siwa; Mariah Belgrod; Max & Harvey; RoomieOfficial
Best Boy Band	Best Solo Breakout
**BTS**; AJR; CNCO; In Real Life; PRETTYMUCH; The Vamps; Why Don't We	**Louis Tomlinson – One Direction**; Camila Cabello – Fifth Harmony; Niall Horan – One Direction; Liam Payne – One Direction; Harry Styles – One Direction
Best Remix	Cutest Musician's Pet (presented by Paris Hilton)
**"Reggaetón Lento" - CNCO and Little Mix**; "Bon Appétit" - Katy Perry, Migos and 3lau; "Despacito" - Luis Fonsi and Daddy Yankee featuring Justin Bieber; "do re mi" - blackbear featuring Gucci Mane; "Friends" - Justin Bieber and BloodPop with Julia Michaels; "Havana" - Camila Cabello and Daddy Yankee; "Homemade Dynamite" - Lorde, Khalid, Post Malone and SZA; "May I Have This Dance" - Francis & The Lights featuring Chance The Rapper; "Mi Gente" - J Balvin and Willy William featuring Beyoncé	**Toulouse - Ariana Grande**; Batman - Demi Lovato; Bear Rexha - Bebe Rexha; Nugget - Katy Perry; Olivia Benson - Taylor Swift; Pig Pig - Miley Cyrus
Most Thumbed-Up Song of the Year	Most Thumbed-Up Artist of the Year
**"Shape of You" – Ed Sheeran**	**Bruno Mars**
Best Tour	Label of the Year
**U2 - The Joshua Tree Tour**	**Republic Records**
Fangirls Award (presented by Laverne Cox)	iHeartRadio Innovator Award (presented by Pharrell Williams)
**Camila Cabello**	**Chance the Rapper**
iHeartRadio Icon Award (presented by Shaun White)
**Bon Jovi**
