= Latin American Music Awards of 2017 =

3rd Annual Latin American Music Awards
- Date: October 26, 2017
- Location: Dolby Theatre; Los Angeles, California
- Country: United States
- Hosted by: Diego Boneta and Becky G
- Most awards: CNCO and Prince Royce (4)
- Most nominations: Shakira (9)
- Website: Telemundo-Latin American Music Awards

Television/radio coverage
- Network: Telemundo
- Runtime: 180 minutes
- Produced by: Dick Clark Productions

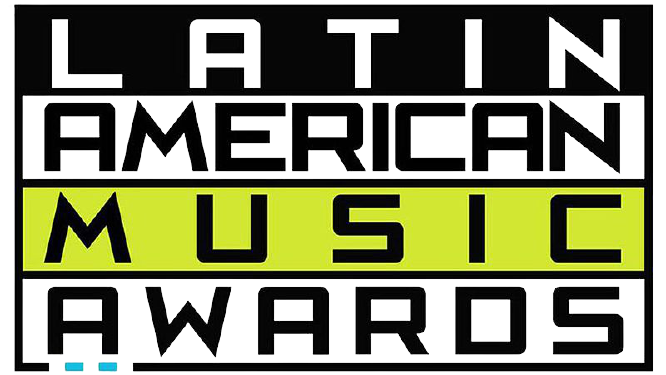
Latin American Music Awards logo

The 3rd Annual Latin American Music Awards were held at the Dolby Theatre in Los Angeles, California. It was broadcast live on Telemundo. Singers Becky G and Diego Boneta were announced as the hosts. Colombian singer-songwriter Shakira led the nominations with nine. American boy band CNCO and American singer-songwriter Prince Royce were the most awarded recipients with four each.

== Nominees and winners ==
The nominations were announced on September 19, 2017.

Artist of the Year	New Artist of the Year
Enrique Iglesias; Banda Sinaloense MS de Sergio Lizárraga; Daddy Yankee; J Balvin; Luis Fonsi; Maluma; Nicky Jam; Romeo Santos; Shakira; Wisin	Ozuna; Christian Nodal; Ulices Chaidez y Sus Plebes
Song of the Year	Album of the Year
Prince Royce & Shakira, "Deja Vu"; Banda Sinaloense MS de Sergio Lizárraga, "Tengo Que Colgar"; Enrique Iglesias Featuring Descemer Bueno, Zion & Lennox, "Súbeme La Radio"; Luis Fonsi & Daddy Yankee Featuring Justin Bieber, "Despacito (Remix)"; Maluma, "Felices Los 4"; Nicky Jam, "El Amante"; Shakira Featuring Maluma, "Chantaje"	CNCO, Primera Cita; Juan Gabriel, Vestido De Etiqueta: Por Eduardo Magallanes; Prince Royce, Five; Romeo Santos, Golden; Shakira, El Dorado
Favorite Pop/Rock Female Artist	Favorite Pop/Rock Male Artist
Gloria Trevi; Alejandra Guzmán; Shakira	Enrique Iglesias; Juanes; Luis Fonsi
Favorite Pop/Rock Duo or Group	Favorite Pop/Rock Album
CNCO; Jesse & Joy; Reik	CNCO, Primera Cita; Juan Gabriel, Vestido De Etiqueta: Por Eduardo Magallanes; Shakira, El Dorado
Favorite Pop/Rock Song	Favorite Regional Mexican Artist
CNCO, "Reggaeton Lento (Bailemos)"; Enrique Iglesias Featuring Descemer Bueno, Zion & Lennox, "Súbeme La Radio"; Luis Fonsi & Daddy Yankee Featuring Justin Bieber, "Despacito (Remix)"; Ricky Martin Featuring Maluma, "Vente Pa'Ca"; Shakira Featuring Maluma, "Chantaje"	Gerardo Ortiz; Christian Nodal; Regulo Caro
Favorite Regional Mexican Duo or Group	Favorite Regional Mexican Album
Banda Sinaloense MS de Sergio Lizárraga; Calibre 50; Los Plebes Del Rancho De Ariel Camacho	Jenni Rivera, Paloma Negra Desde Monterrey; Calibre 50, Desde El Rancho; Los Plebes del Rancho de Ariel Camacho, Recuerden Mi Estilo
Favorite Regional Mexican Song	Favorite Urban Artist
Christian Nodal, "Adiós Amor"; Banda Sinaloense MS de Sergio Lizárraga, "Tengo Que Colgar"; Calibre 50, "Siempre Te Voy A Querer"; Gerardo Ortiz, "Regresa Hermosa"; Ulices Chaidez y Sus Plebes, "Te Regalo"	J Balvin; Daddy Yankee; Maluma; Nicky Jam; Wisin
Favorite Urban Song	Favorite Tropical Artist
Maluma, "Felices Los 4"; Farruko Featuring Ky-Mani Marley, "Chillax"; J Balvin Featuring Pharrell Williams, BIA & Sky, "Safari"; Nicky Jam, "El Amante"; Wisin, "Vacaciones"	Prince Royce; Gente de Zona; Romeo Santos
Favorite Tropical Album	Favorite Tropical Song
Prince Royce, Five; El Gran Combo de Puerto Rico, Alunizando; Romeo Santos, Golden	Prince Royce & Shakira, "Deja Vu"; Gente De Zona, "Algo Contigo"; Héctor Acosta "El Torito", "Amorcito Enfermito"; Jennifer Lopez & Marc Anthony, "Olvídame y Pega La Vuelta"; Romeo Santos, "Imitadora"
Favorite Collaboration	Favorite Crossover Artist
Enrique Iglesias Featuring Descemer Bueno, Zion & Lennox, "Súbeme La Radio"; Luis Fonsi & Daddy Yankee Featuring Justin Bieber, "Despacito (Remix)"; Shakira Featuring Maluma, "Chantaje"	Selena Gomez; Justin Bieber; The Weeknd

== Multiple nominations and awards ==
Acts that received multiple nominations
Nominations	Act
9	Shakira
8	Maluma
5	Daddy Yankee
5	Enrique Iglesias
5	Luis Fonsi
5	Prince Royce
5	Romeo Santos
4	Banda Sinaloense MS de Sergio Lizárraga
4	CNCO
4	Justin Bieber
4	Nicky Jam
3	Calibre 50
3	Christian Nodal
3	Descemer Bueno
3	J Balvin
3	Wisin
3	Zion & Lennox
2	Gente de Zona
2	Gerardo Ortiz
2	Juan Gabriel
2	Los Plebes del Rancho de Ariel Camacho
2	Ulices Chaidez y Sus Plebes

Acts that received multiple awards
Awards	Act
4	CNCO
4	Prince Royce
3	Enrique Iglesias
2	Shakira
