= Todo Cambió (song) =

2017 single by Becky G

Single by Becky G
- Language: Spanish
- English title: "Everything Changed"
- Released: March 3, 2017
- Recorded: 2016
- Genre: Tropical house
- Length: 3:54
- Label: Kemosabe
- Composers: Gamal Lewis; Jeff Marco Martinez; Mathieu Jomphe-Lepine; Saul Alexander Castillo Vasquez; Steven Dominguez
- Lyricists: Rebbeca Marie Gomez; Martin Rodriguez Vicente
- Producer: A.C.

Becky G singles chronology
"Si Una Vez (If I Once)" (2017)	"Todo Cambió" (2017)	"Que Nos Animemos" (2017)

CNCO singles chronology
"Para Enamorarte" (2016)	"Todo cambió (remix)" (2017)	"Hey DJ" (2017)

Music video
- "Todo Cambio" on YouTube

"Todo Cambió " is a song by American singer Becky G. It was released on March 3, 2017 by Kemosabe Records as the intended third single from her then-forthcoming Spanish debut album. Gomez released two remixes: the first featuring boy band CNCO and the second with Justin Quiles. The song was later scrapped along with two other singles from the record, while her Spanish debut album was released in 2019.

== Background ==
Gomez began rumors of marriage to her boyfriend, Sebastian Lletget, after posting photos of herself wearing a wedding dress on social media. She later clarified that it was all part of the music video for the single. Gomez has stated that the song came to her while her life was "going through a lovely turnaround".

== Music video ==
The music video, directed by Daniel Duran, was filmed in Madrid, Spain. It was uploaded on Gomez's VEVO account on March 2. As of November 2023, the visual has over 101 million views.

The video sees Gomez walking dogs and collides with a man walking his own. They end up talking and began dating. Later on, another man, possibly her boyfriend, proposes to Gomez and she agrees. While getting ready for the wedding, Gomez starts doubting the relationship. As she is walking down the aisle, Gomez's dogs bark and she stops, thinking about the other man she met. After realizing she loves him, Gomez decides to run and chase her true love.

== Track listing ==
Digital download
No.	Title	Length
1.	"Todo Cambio"	3:54

Digital download
No.	Title	Length
1.	"Todo Cambio" (CNCO remix)	3:53

Digital download
No.	Title	Length
1.	"Todo Cambio Remix" (Justin Quiles remix)	3:15

== Charts ==
Chart (2017)	Peak position
Spain (PROMUSICAE) (featuring CNCO)	94
US Latin Pop Airplay (Billboard)	31
US Hot Latin Songs (Billboard)	33

== Certifications ==
Region	Certification	Certified units/sales
Brazil (Pro-Música Brasil)	Gold	30,000^{‡}
^{‡} Sales+streaming figures based on certification alone.
