= Mamita (song) =

2017 single by CNCO

Single by CNCO

from the album CNCO
- Language: Spanish
- Released: October 20, 2017
- Length: 2:54
- Label: Sony Latin
- Songwriter(s): Salomón Villada; Andrés Restrepo; Johan Espinosa; Carlos Patiño; Claudia Menkarski; Juan Pablo Piedrahita; Daniel Giraldo
- Producer(s): Feid; El Rolo; Mosty

CNCO singles chronology
"Reggaetón Lento (Remix)" (2017)	"Mamita" (2017)	"Mamita (Remix)" (2018)

Music video
- "Mamita" on YouTube

"Mamita" is a song by American boy band CNCO and the third single from their second self-titled studio album. It was written by Johan Espinosa, Claudia Brant, Juan Pablo Piedrahita, Daniel Giraldo, and its producers Feid, El Rolo and Mosty. The song was released by Sony Music Latin on October 20, 2017. A remix with Brazilian singer Luan Santana was released on March 26, 2018.

== Music video ==
The music video was directed by Daniel Duran and filmed in Quito, the capital of Ecuador. Five women take the band on adventures through the city, visiting the Quilotoa volcano, the crystal palace and the Quito Cathedral. Before its release, the group had previously released a video with footage of the band performing the song during shows.

== Critical reception/Remix ==
Latin Times described the song as having "some of the sexiest lyrics to date", with a "fun video that celebrates their Latin heritage".

"Mamita (Remix)"

Single by CNCO and Luan Santana
- Language: Spanish; Portuguese
- Released: March 23, 2018

CNCO singles chronology
"Mamita" (2018)	"Mamita (Remix)" (2018)	"Sólo Yo" (2018)

Luan Santana singles chronology
"On Top of World" (2018)	"Mamita (Remix)" (2018)	"2050" (2018)

== Charts ==
=== Weekly charts ===
Chart (2017–2018)	Peak position
Argentina (Monitor Latino)	5
Bolivia (Monitor Latino)	11
Brazil (Brasil Hot 100 Airplay) Remix with Luan Santana	63
Chile (Monitor Latino)	9
Costa Rica (Monitor Latino)	8
Ecuador (National-Report)	12
El Salvador (Monitor Latino)	17
Mexico (Billboard Mexican Airplay)	27
Portugal (AFP)	100
Uruguay (Monitor Latino)	12
US Hot Latin Songs (Billboard)	28
US Latin Airplay (Billboard)	34
US Latin Rhythm Airplay (Billboard)	18
Venezuela (National-Report)	31

=== Year-end charts ===
Chart (2018)	Position
Argentina (Monitor Latino)	24

== Certifications ==
Region	Certification	Certified units/sales
Brazil (Pro-Música Brasil)	Platinum	60,000^{‡}
Mexico (AMPROFON)	2× Platinum	120,000^{‡}
United States (RIAA)	Gold (Latin)	30,000^{‡}
^{‡} Sales+streaming figures based on certification alone.
