= Big Boy (rapper) =

Puerto Rican rap and reggaeton songwriter

- Also known as: Mr. Big
- Born: Gustavo Roy Diaz; March 11, 1975 (age 51); Carolina, Puerto Rico
- Genres: Reggae, dancehall, hip hop, Ragga
- Occupation: Rapper
- Instrument: Vocals
- Years active: 1990–present

Gustavo Roy Diaz (born March 11, 1975) is a Puerto Rican reggaeton rapper. He is considered one of the founding fathers of reggaeton in Puerto Rico. He is known for his worldwide success in the 1990s, with songs such as "Mis Ojos Lloran Por Ti", "Maria", "He Chocado Con La Vida", "Que Vayas Con Dios" and "Mi Chica De La Voz Sensual". His album "The Phenomenon" was nominated for the 2003 Latin Grammy Awards for Best Rap/Hip-Hop Album and for the Premios Lo Nuestro 2003 for Urban Album of the Year and Best Urban Performance. His song "Mis Ojos Lloran Por Ti" peaked at 18 in Top Latin Songs.

The melodic vocals in the introduction and chorus were performed by Ángel López, who later became the lead vocalist of Puerto Rican boy band Son by Four.

== Biography ==
=== Beginnings and "Mr. Big" ===
After performing live in his native Santurce to promote his first songs, Big Boy signed up Musical Productions to release his first album in 1993, titled "Mr. Big" of which his first single "Maria" was a worldwide success. Then, between 1994 and 1996, Big Boy began releasing albums like "Que Vayas Con Dios" and "Mis Ojos Lloran Por Ti" which included songs mostly influenced by '90s American rap, Latin, and Afro-Caribbean rhythms.

=== Worldwide success in his career ===
In the mid-1990s, his music started ranking up in lists at Central and South America and he became one of the most important artists of Latin rap and reggae. Songs such as "Mis Ojos Lloran Por Ti", "Mi Chica De La Voz Sensual" and "He Chocado Con La Vida" were the ones that made this success possible. After a break of two years, in 1999, he signed up with Sony Music in association with Musical Productions, and decided to release his new studio album, "Big Impact". The most known songs of this album were "Voy a To'as" with Puerto Rican rapper MC Ceja, and "Hacerte el Amor" in two versions, English and Spanish. In 2000, he released his new studio album, "Virus", album which featured collaborations with many artists of the genre of reggaeton. Artists such as Nicky Jam, Karel (from Karel & Voltio), Georgie and Alex Rivera were part of this album. Two years later, in 2002, he released his new album titled "The Phenomenon", which was a very important album in his career with songs like "Amiga Ven" and "La Culpable" that were hits came off globally. For 2003, Mr. Big released a new album, "Dando Candela", that was widely accepted throughout Latin America, from which songs like "Una Mujer Como Tu" with participation of the artist Zorro Viejo and stood out "Donde Esta El Amor" which featured former singer of Son By Four, Angel Lopez. Later, surprisingly, Big Boy quit Musical Productions to sign with Universal Music and released his tenth album in 2005, "The Comeback". The success of this album was not as expected, and in 2006 he returned to Musical Productions to release his last album, "Reggaeton Reloaded Version 2.5". This album is a compilation of his 2000s hits.

=== Break in career to present ===
After releasing Reggaeton Reloaded Version 2.5, Big Boy took a break in his career and did not record any more songs. The hiatus lasted seven years, and in 2013 little was known about the life of Big Boy, yet he suddenly returned in a collaboration with the artist of underground reggaeton Jamsha, titled "Donde Estan Toas Las Yales". His most recent songs are “Tranquilo”, released in 2015, and “A Tu Nombre”, released in 2017. Big Boy is currently living in Carolina, Puerto Rico.

== Discography ==
=== Studio albums ===
- Mr. Big (1993)
- Que Vayas Con Dios (1994)
- Mis Ojos Lloran Por Ti (1996)
- He Chocado Con La Vida (1997)
- Big Impact (1999)
- Virus (2000)
- The Phenomenon (2002)
- Dando Candela (2003)
- El Comeback (2005)

=== Compilation albums ===
- Megamix (1999)
- Reggaeton Reloaded Version 2.5 (2006)

== See also ==
- List of Puerto Rican songwriters
- List of Puerto Ricans
- Music of Puerto Rico
