= Déjà Vu (CNCO album) =

Studio album by CNCO
- Released: February 6, 2021
- Studio: The Groove Studio
- Genre: Latin pop; Bachata; Reggaeton
- Length: 38:58
- Label: Sony Music Latin

CNCO chronology
Que Quiénes Somos (2019)	Déjà Vu (2021)	XOXO (2022)

Singles from Deja Vu
- 1. "Tan Enamorados" Released: November 13, 2020; 2. "Mis Ojos Lloran Por Ti" Released: November 20, 2020; 3. "Hero" Released: December 4, 2020; 4. "Solo Importas Tú" Released: January 31, 2021; 5. "Dejaría Todo" Released: February 5, 2021

Déjà Vu is the third studio album by the Latin American boy band CNCO. The album was released on 6 February 2021 via Sony Music and recorded at The Groove Studio. It is a cover and visual album, composed of classic songs from Latin music from the 1980s and forward, and music videos paying homage to past boy bands.

== Background ==
CNCO released their first extended play (EP) Qué Quiénes Somos in October 2019. The proyect marked the first time the band gained majority of the creative control on a body of work. The group announced a concert series titled "Press Start Tour" in January 2020, but it was cancelled due to the COVID-19 pandemic. Their then-third studio album was also pushed back, but the boy band released the songs "Honey Boo" with Dominican singer Natti Natasha and "Beso" in April and August, respectively. CNCO spoke with American Songwriter about what Latin artists of the past mean to them, how the mashup for “Hero” came about, where they hope Latin music goes in the year to come, and more. Four singles were released prior to the album, with the fifth one accompanying the LP on its release date.

At the beginning of quarantine, we took some time off since we had been traveling a lot these past few years.[...] We were able to reconnect with our families and reflect on all we’ve achieved and look back at the music that inspired us to get where we are. We decided to have fun and bring back these classics, with the CNCO touch."

== Critical reception ==
Cristina Jaleru of Associated Press stated that the work "weaves a love story in catchy modern rhythms more suitable for the dance floor".

Mitchell Peters of Billboard indicated that "The quintet takes on tracks like Enrique Iglesias’ “Hero” and Sin Bandera’s “Entra En Mi Vida” with a mix of reverence and invention, honoring the originals while utilizing different harmonies to amplify their power". Cristina Jaleru also states “Déjà Vu,” the third album from Latin American sensation CNCO, takes on the challenge of reimagining some of the greatest Spanish hits from the ’80s up to the early 2000s with aplomb and a little aid from that contemporary reggaeton bassline.

Sara London of RIFF Magazine said that "The record is a contemplative, yet convivial call to the past; an extended shoutout to the members’ personal histories and cultures".

Independent magazine stated “25 Horas” by Proyecto Uno goes from folky to contemporary while keeping its tribal instrumental edge. Chayanne’s “Dejaría Todo” turns from a typical ’90s guitar ballad to a livelier sound. Big Boy’s “Mis Ojos Lloran Por Ti” goes from a simple keyboard with creole rap in the mix to a smoother, more romantic affair. And Ricardo Montaner’s absolute pop ballad “Tan Enamorados” finds its sensual side.

== Track listing ==
Track listings adapted from Spotify.

Standard Edition
No.	Title	Writer(s)	Producer(s)	Length
1.	"Tan Enamorados" (by Ricardo Montaner)	Giovanni Togni; Guido Morra	Andrés Torres; Mauricio Rengifo	2:56
2.	"Amor Narcótico" (by Chichí Peralta)	José del Carmen Feliz Matos	Andrés Torres; Mauricio Rengifo	2:48
3.	"Dejaría Todo" (by Chayanne)	Fabio Estefano Salgado	Andrés Torres; Mauricio Rengifo	3:08
4.	"Entra en Mi Vida" (by Sin Bandera)	Leonel García; Noel Schajris	Alejandro Ramirez; Nicolás Jaña Galleguillos	3:09
5.	"Hero" (by Enrique Iglesias)	Enrique Iglesias; Mark Taylor; Michael Barry	Andres Castro	3:19
6.	"Imaginame Sin Ti" (by Luis Fonsi)	Mark Portmann; Rudy Amado Perez	Andres Castro	2:43
7.	"Un Beso" (by Aventura)	Anthony Santos	Andres Castro	3:04
8.	"Mis Ojos Lloran Por Ti" (by Big Boy featuring Ángel Lopez)	Gustavo Roy Diaz	Alejandro Ramirez; Nicolás Jaña Galleguillos	3:05
9.	"La Quiero a Morir" (by Dark Latin Groove)	Francis Christian Cabrel; Luis Gómez-Escolar	Andrés Torres; Mauricio Rengifo	3:08
10.	"Solo Importas Tú" (by Franco De Vita)	Franco De Vita	Andrés Torres	2:37
11.	"El Amor de Mi Vida" (by Ricky Martin)	Eduardo Alfredo Sierra	Andrés Torres	3:03
12.	"Por Amarte Así" (by Cristian Castro)	Alejandro Montalban; Eduardo Rogelio Reyes Nápoles	Slow	2:38
13.	"25 Horas" (by Proyecto Uno)	Isaac Cedeno; Josue Cedeno; Nelson Zapata	The Rude Boyz	3:14
Total length:				38:58

Deluxe Edition
No.	Title	Writer(s)	Producer(s)	Length
14.	"Héroe" (by Enrique Iglesias)	Chema García; Enrique Iglesias; Mark Taylor; Michael Barry	Andres Castro	3:18
Total length:				42:16

== Charts ==
Chart (2021)	Peak position
Spanish Albums (Promusicae)	33
Swiss Albums (Schweizer Hitparade)	98
US Top Latin Albums (Billboard)	19
US Indie Store Album Sales (Billboard)	14
US Top Album Sales (Billboard)	82
US Top Current Album Sales (Billboard)	37
