= Primera Cita =

Studio album by CNCO
- Released: August 26, 2016
- Recorded: January–July 2016
- Genres: Latin pop; reggaeton
- Length: 50:17
- Language: Spanish
- Label: Sony Music Latin
- Directors: Jose Vega; Carlos Perez
- Producers: Rudy Bethancourt; Richard Bravo; David Cabrera; Ethan Carlson; Jorge Class; Bruno Dabruk; Juan Luis "Wisin" Morera; Luis O'Neill; Eric Perez; Dan Warner; Los Legendarios

CNCO chronology
Primera Cita (2016)	CNCO (2018)

Singles from Primera Cita
- 1. "Tan Fácil" Released: March 4, 2016; 2. "Quisiera" Released: May 13, 2016; 3. "Reggaetón Lento (Bailemos)" Released: August 26, 2016; 4. "Para Enamorarte" Released: December 19, 2016

Primera Cita is the debut studio album by the Latin American boy band CNCO. It was released on 26 August 2016, through Sony Music Latin. The album was the recipient for the Lo Nuestro Award for Pop Album of the Year at the 29th ceremony.

== Commercial performance ==
The album debuted at number 1 on the Billboard Top Latin Albums chart with first-week sales of 11,000 copies in the United States. It also accumulated over one million streams on Spotify in just hours after its release. Primera Cita was the best-selling Latin debut album of 2016 in the United States and Puerto Rico. The album also debuted in the Top 10 in fifteen countries, including number 1 in Bolivia, Ecuador and Guatemala.

== Accolades ==
Year	Award	Category	Result	Ref.
2017	Billboard Latin Music Awards	Latin Pop Album of the Year	Nominated	
2017	Billboard Music Awards	Top Latin Album	Nominated	
2017	Latin American Music Awards	Album of the Year	Won	
2017	Latin American Music Awards	Favorite Pop/Rock Album	Won	
2017	Premio Lo Nuestro 2017	Pop/Rock Album of the Year	Won	

== Track listing ==
No.	Title	Writer(s)	Length
1.	"Quisiera"	Johan Arjona; Juan Luis Londoño; Juan Luis Morera	3:05
2.	"Tan Fácil"	Christian Linares; Juan Luis Morera; Marco Ramírez; Víctor Rafael Torres	3:30
3.	"Reggaetón Lento (Bailemos)"	Jadan Andino; Jorge Class; Luis Ángel O'Neill; Eric Pérez	3:42
4.	"Primera Cita"	Johan Arjona	3:38
5.	"Para Enamorarte"	Juan Luis Morera; Mauricio Rengifo; Sebastián Yatra	3:08
6.	"No Entiendo"	Marcos Alfonso Ramírez Carrasquillo; Juan Luis Morera; Norgie Noriega; José Torres; VÍctor Rafael Torres	4:12
7.	"Devuélveme Mi Corazón"	David Augustave; Juan Luis Morera; Bruno Nicolás; José Luis De La Pena	3:26
8.	"Cometa"	Yadam González; Beatríz Luengo; Johan Arjona	3:37
9.	"Volverte a Ver"	Christian Carrasquillo; Marcos Alfonso Ramírez Carrasquillo; Juan Luis Morera; Víctor Rafael Torres	4:11
10.	"Tú Luz"	Marcos Alfonso Ramírez Carrasquillo; Juan Luis Morera; Víctor Rafael Torres	3:53
11.	"Cien"	Johan Arjona	3:07
12.	"Más Allá"	Marcos Alfonso Ramírez Carrasquillo; Juan Luis Morera; Víctor Rafael Torres	3:40
13.	"Quisiera (Ballad Version)" (featuring Abraham Mateo)	Johan Arjona; Juan Luis Londoño; Juan Luis Morera	3:08
14.	"Tan Fácil (Remix)" (featuring Wisin)	Christian Linares; Juan Luis Morera; Marco Ramírez; Víctor Rafael Torres	3:45
Total length:			50:17

Brazil Version
No.	Title	Writer(s)	Length
14.	"Tan Fácil (Spanish-Portuguese Version)" (with Zé Felipe)	Christian Linares; Juan Luis Morera; Marco Ramírez; Víctor Rafael Torres	3:29
Total length:			49:46

== Charts ==
=== Weekly charts ===
Chart (2016–17)	Peak position
Argentine Albums (CAPIF)	1
Mexican Albums (AMPROFON)	15
Portuguese Albums (AFP)	22
Spanish Albums (Promusicae)	24
Uruguayan Albums (CUD)	4
US Billboard 200	39
US Latin Pop Albums (Billboard)	1
US Top Latin Albums (Billboard)	1
Venezuelan Albums (Recordland)	20

=== Monthly charts ===
Chart (2016)	Peak position
Argentine Albums (CAPIF)	6
Uruguayan Albums (CUD)	4

=== Year-end charts ===
Chart (2016)	Position
US Latin Pop Albums (Billboard)	6
US Top Latin Albums (Billboard)	14

Chart (2017)	Position
Mexican Albums (AMPROFON)	79
US Top Latin Albums (Billboard)	8

Chart (2018)	Position
US Top Latin Albums (Billboard)	56

== Certifications ==
Region	Certification	Certified units/sales
Brazil (Pro-Música Brasil)	Gold	20,000^{‡}
Colombia (ASINCOL)	Gold	
Mexico (AMPROFON)	2× Platinum	120,000^{‡}
United States (RIAA)	Gold (Latin)	30,000^{‡}
^{‡} Sales+streaming figures based on certification alone.

== Más Allá Tour ==
Más Allá Tour
- Tour by CNCO
- Associated album: Primera Cita
- Start date: February 26, 2017
- End date: December 16, 2017
- Legs: 5
- No. of shows: 26 in Latin America; 25 in North America; 7 in Europe; 58 in Total

CNCO concert chronology
- Mas Allá Tour (2017); CNCO World Tour (2018-2019)

CNCO embarked on the Más Allá Tour in order to support the album. The tour began on February 26, 2017, in Cochabamba, Bolivia and concluded on December 16, 2017, in Buenos Aires, Argentina.

=== Setlist ===
This set list is representative of the show on April 1, 2017, in Santo Domingo, Dominican Republic. It is not representative of all concerts for the duration of the tour.

1. "Quisiera"
2. "Tan Fácil"
3. "Reggaetón Lento (Bailemos)"
4. "Primera Cita"
5. "Para Enamorarte"
6. "No Entiendo"
7. "Devuélveme Mi Corazón"
8. "Cometa"
9. "Volverte A Ver"
10. "Tu Luz"
11. "Cien"
12. "Más Allá"
13. "Quisiera (Ballad Remix)"
14. "Tan Fácil (Urban Remix)"
Notes
- During selected dates, Richard performed a cover of J Balvin's "Safari" instead of "Can't Feel My Face"/"One Dance".

=== Tour dates ===
List of concerts, showing date, city, country, venue, tickets sold, number of available tickets and amount of gross revenue
Date	City	Country	Venue	Attendance	Revenue
Latin America
February 26, 2017 (Note: The concert of February 26, 2017 in Cochabamba is part of the Cochabamba Carnaval.)	Cochabamba	Bolivia	Campo Ferial	—N/a	—N/a
February 27, 2017 (Note: The concerts of February 27 and 28, 2017 in Santa Cruz are part of the Santa Cruz Carnaval.)	Santa Cruz	Bolivia	Juventud Carnavalera	—N/a	—N/a
February 28, 2017	Santa Cruz	Bolivia	Bloque Carnavalero	—N/a	—N/a
March 16, 2017	Guayaquil	Ecuador	Centro de Convenciones	—N/a	—N/a
March 17, 2017	Machala	Ecuador	Estadio 9 de Mayo	—N/a	—N/a
March 18, 2017	Salinas	Ecuador	Estadio Camilo Gallegos	—N/a	—N/a
March 23, 2017	Cuenca	Ecuador	Coliseo Jefferson Perez Quezada	—N/a	—N/a
March 24, 2017	Ambato	Ecuador	Estadio Bellavista	—N/a	—N/a
March 25, 2017	Quito	Ecuador	Coliseo General Rumiñahui	—N/a	—N/a
March 30, 2017	Panama City	Panama	Figali Convention Center	—N/a	—N/a
April 1, 2017	Santo Domingo	Dominican Republic	Salón de Eventos de Sambil	—N/a	—N/a
April 11, 2017 (Note: The concert of April 11, 2017 in Ciudad Valles was part of the 2017 Feria Nacional de la Huasteca Potosina.)	Ciudad Valles	Mexico	Teatro del Pueblo	—N/a	—N/a
April 13, 2017 (Note: The concert of April 13, 2017 in Puerto Quetzal was part of the 2017 Gallo Evolution Festival.)	Puerto Quetzal	Guatemala	Super 24	—N/a	—N/a
April 15, 2017 (Note: The concert of April 15, 2017 in Xicotepec was part of the 69th Feria de Primavera Xicotepec.)	Xicotepec	Mexico	Recinto del Pueblo	—N/a	—N/a
April 22, 2017	San Juan	Puerto Rico	José Miguel Agrelot Coliseum	10,987 / 11,817	$493,308
April 29, 2017 (Note: The concert of April 29, 2017 in San Salvador was part of the Tómate La Ciudad Fest 2017.)	San Salvador	El Salvador	Centro de Ferias y Convenciones	—N/a	—N/a
April 30, 2017 (Note: THe concert of April 30, 2017 in Bogotá was to celebrate The Child's day.)	Bogotá	Colombia	Parque Mundo Aventura	—N/a	—N/a
May 1, 2017	Barranquilla	Colombia	Trucupey Disco	—N/a	—N/a
May 2, 2017	Cartagena	Colombia	Paseo de la Castellana	—N/a	—N/a
May 3, 2017	Cali	Colombia	Liceo Benalcazar	—N/a	—N/a
May 4, 2017	Medellín	Colombia	Centro Comercial Santafé	—N/a	—N/a
May 5, 2017	Bogotá	Colombia	Plaza de las Américas	—N/a	—N/a
May 25, 2017	Montevideo	Uruguay	Palacio Peñarol	—N/a	—N/a
May 26, 2017	Buenos Aires	Argentina	Luna Park	—N/a	—N/a
May 28, 2017	Buenos Aires	Argentina	Luna Park	—N/a	—N/a
May 30, 2017	Córdoba	Argentina	Quality Espacio	—N/a	—N/a
July 8, 2017 (Note: The concert of July 8, 2017 in Lima is part of the 9th Juntos en Concierto Festival.)	Lima	Peru	Estadio Nacional	—N/a	—N/a
July 20, 2017	Monterrey	Mexico	Arena Monterrey	5,048 / 7,475	$191,103
July 21, 2017	Mexico City	Mexico	National Auditorium	9,620 / 9,620	$392,417
July 23, 2017	Guadalajara	Mexico	Auditorio Telmex	6,688 / 7,569	$277,399
July 25, 2017 (Note: The concert of July 25, 2017 in Durango at Velaria is part of the Feria Nacional de Durango.)	Durango	Mexico	Velaria	—N/a	—N/a
July 27, 2017 (Note: The concert of July 27, 2017 in San Juan at Bahia Urbana is part of the KQ Sunsets.)	San Juan	Puerto Rico	Bahia Urbana	—N/a	—N/a
August 26, 2017 (Note: The concert of August 26, 2017 in Guadalajara at Diana Theatre is part of the Los 40 Pre-Show.)	Guadalajara	Mexico	Diana Theatre	—N/a	—N/a
August 29, 2017 (Note: The concert of August 29, 2017 in Tijuana at Alebrije Club is part of the La Tocada Pulsar.)	Tijuana	Mexico	Alebrije Club	—N/a	—N/a
August 30, 2017 (Note: The concert of August 30, 2017 in Querétaro at Auditorio Josefa Ortiz de Domínguez is part of the 91 Fest 2017.)	Querétaro	Mexico	Auditorio Josefa Ortiz de Domínguez	—N/a	—N/a
August 31, 2017 (Note: The concert of August 31, 2017 in León at The Factory Shops is part of the EXA Acústico.)	León	Mexico	The Factory Shops	—N/a	—N/a
September 1, 2017 (Note: The concert of September 1, 2017 in Mexico City at Barezzito Polanco is part of the Oye Live.)	Mexico City	Mexico	Barezzito Polanco	—N/a	—N/a
September 16, 2017	La Romana	Dominican Republic	Anfiteatro Altos de Chavón	—N/a	—N/a
Europe
October 18, 2017	Salamanca	Spain	Pabellón Multiusos Sánchez Paraíso	—N/a	—N/a
October 19, 2017	Seville	Spain	Auditorio Fibes	—N/a	—N/a
October 20, 2017	Bilbao	Spain	Sala CUE	—N/a	—N/a
October 21, 2017 (Note: The concert of October 21, 2017 in Madrid is part of the Coca-Cola Music Experience.)	Madrid	Spain	WiZink Center	—N/a	—N/a
October 22, 2017 (Note: The concert of October 22, 2017 in Barcelona is part of the Vodafone Yu Music Shows.)	Barcelona	Spain	Barcelona Arts	—N/a	—N/a
October 24, 2017	Milan	Italy	Fabrique	—N/a	—N/a
October 25, 2017	Padua	Italy	Gran Teatro Geox	—N/a	—N/a
Latin America
November 9, 2017	Mérida	Mexico	Coliseo Yucatán	—N/a	—N/a
November 10, 2017	Villahermosa	Mexico	Teatro al Aire Libre Parque Tabasco	—N/a	—N/a
November 11, 2017	Tuxtla Gutiérrez	Mexico	Poliforum Chiapas	—N/a	—N/a
November 12, 2017	Mexico City	Mexico	National Auditorium	8,084 / 9,620	$282,088
November 23, 2017	León	Mexico	Poliforum León	—N/a	—N/a
November 24, 2017	Morelia	Mexico	Plaza de Toros Monumental	—N/a	—N/a
December 6, 2017	Santa Cruz	Bolivia	Ventura Arena	—	—
December 7, 2017	La Paz	Bolivia	Teatro al Aire Libre	—	—
December 9, 2017	Santiago	Chile	Movistar Arena	—	—
December 16, 2017	Buenos Aires	Argentina	Hipódromo de Palermo	—	—
February 8, 2018 (Note: The concert of February 8, 2018 in Campeche is part of the Campeche Carnival.)	Campeche	Mexico	Foro Ah-Kim-Pech	—N/a	—N/a
February 11, 2018 (Note: The concert of February 11, 2018 in Mar del Plata is part of the Movistar Fri Music Festival.)	Mar del Plata	Argentina	Paseo Hermitage	—N/a	—N/a
February 12, 2018 (Note: The concert of February 12, 2018 in Buenos Aires is part of the Carnaval de Vicente López.)	Buenos Aires	Argentina	Complejo al Río	—N/a	—N/a
February 14, 2018	Córdoba	Argentina	Quality Espacio	—	—
February 15, 2018	Rosario	Argentina	Hipódromo de Rosario	—	—
February 17, 2018 (Note: The concert on February 17, 2018, in El Calafate is part of the 2018 Fiesta Nacional del Lago.)	El Calafate	Argentina	Anfiteatro del Bosque	—N/a	—N/a
February 20, 2018	Corrientes	Argentina	Anfiteatro Cocomarola	—	—
February 22, 2018 (Note: The concert on February 22, 2018, in San Juan is part of the National Day of the Sun 2018.)	San Juan	Argentina	Fiesta Nacional del Sol	—N/a	—N/a
February 25, 2018 (Note: The concert of February 25, 2018 in Viña del Mar is part of the LIX Viña del Mar International Song Festival.)	Viña del Mar	Chile	Quinta Vergara Amphitheater	—N/a	—N/a
February 27, 2018	Santiago	Chile	Movistar Arena	—	—
March 1, 2018	Concepción	Chile	Gimnasio Municipal	—	—
March 3, 2018	Chiriquí	Panama	Chiriquí Mall	—	—
March 4, 2018	Panama City	Panama	Roberto Durán Arena	—	—
March 18, 2018	Alajuela	Costa Rica	Parque Viva	—	—
Total				32,343 / 36,481	$1,354,227

=== Cancelled shows ===
List of cancelled shows, showing date, city, country and reason for cancellation
Date	City	Country	Venue	Reason
March 31, 2017	Valencia	Venezuela	Forum de Valencia	"Logistical issues"
October 31, 2017 (Note: The concerts of October 31, 2017 in Arequipa and November 1, 2017 in Lima are part of the Fiesta Latina Festival.)	Arequipa	Peru	Centro de Convenciones Galdoz	"Logistical problems"
November 1, 2017	Lima	Peru	Jockey Club	"Logistical problems"

== See also ==
- 2016 in Latin music
- CNCO discography
- List of number-one Billboard Latin Albums from the 2010s
