= CNCO =

Latin boy band (2015–2023)

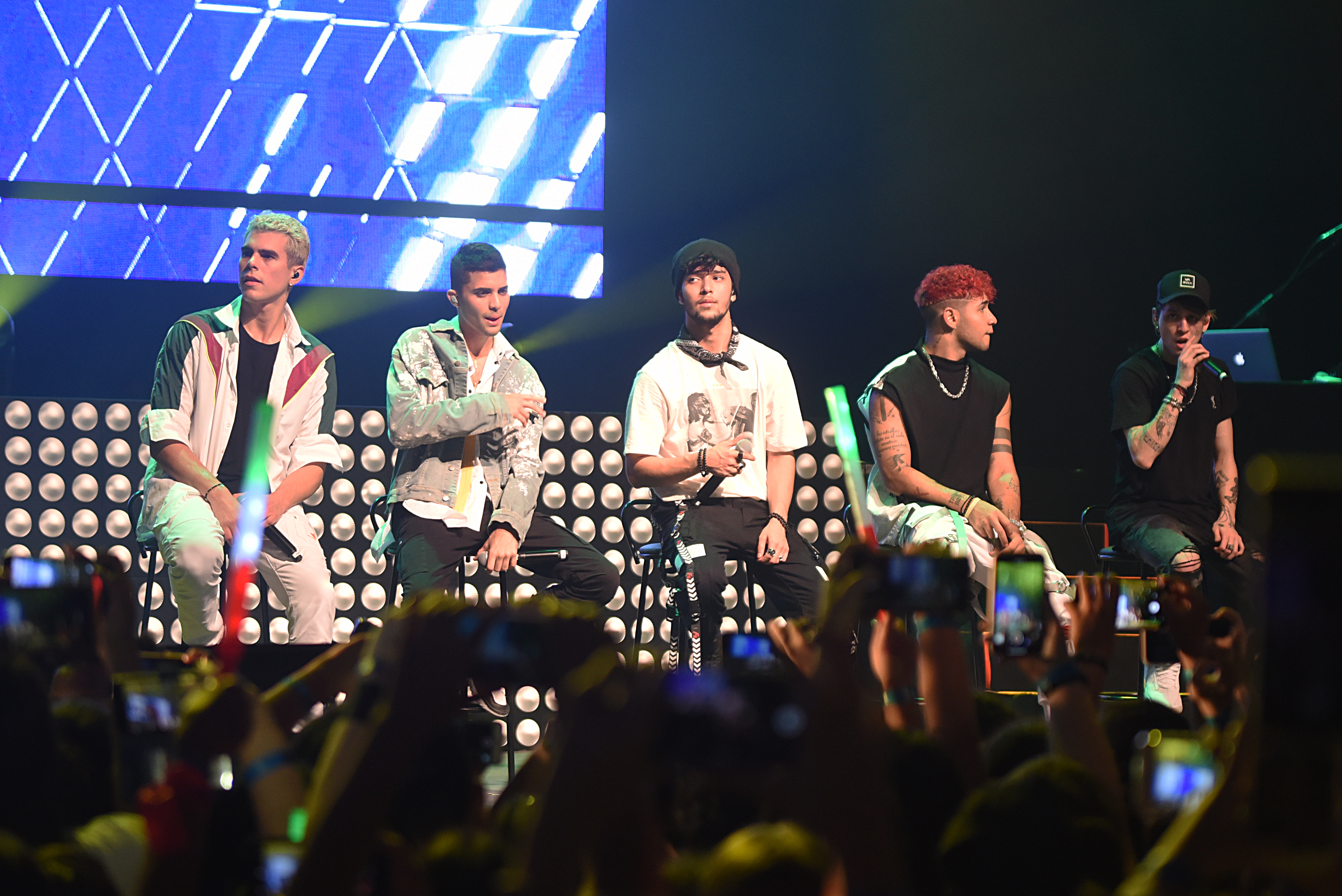
- CNCO performing in 2019 (from left to right: Zabdiel, Erick, Joel, Richard and Christopher).

Background information
- Origin: Miami, Florida, U.S.
- Genres: Reggaeton; Latin pop
- Works: Discography
- Years active: 2015–2023
- Label: Sony Latin
- Past members: Richard Camacho; Erick Brian Colón; Zabdiel De Jesús; Christopher Vélez; Joel DELEŌN

CNCO was a Latin American boy band formed in Miami, Florida in 2015. The group consisted of Richard Camacho, Erick Brian Colón, Christopher Vélez and Zabdiel De Jesús; Joel Pimentel was a member until his departure in May 2021. They won a five-year recording contract with Sony Music Latin after becoming the winning competitors of the first season of La Banda. The band toured with Ricky Martin. Their first two singles "Tan Fácil" and "Quisiera", charted well soon after their debut. They released their first album, Primera Cita, on August 26, 2016, which included the third single and mainstream hit "Reggaetón Lento (Bailemos)".

The group released their self-titled second studio album on April 6, 2018, which included the singles "Hey DJ", "Mamita" and "Se Vuelve Loca". Their debut EP Que Quiénes Somos, containing the singles "De Cero" and "Pegao" (featuring Manuel Turizo), was released on October 11, 2019. Both albums debuted at number one on the Billboard Top Latin Albums and the top 40 on the Billboard 200, while the EP debuted within the top 15 of the former chart.

In 2020, they began the era of their album Déjà Vu, a visual cover album of Latin pop classics, with three singles released from November to December. On February 5, 2021, the band released the LP. The album was preceded by the fourth single and accompanied by the fifth on its release day.

On July 21, 2022, the band announced that they would be breaking up to focus on their solo careers but would continue as a group for another year and a half. In August 2022, on the anniversary of their debut album's release, the boy band released their last studio album, titled XOXO, containing the singles "Toa La Noche", "La Equivocada", "Party, Humo & Alcohol" and "Pluton", featuring Mexican urban singer Kenia Os. Their final single "La Ultima Canción" was released in May 2023. The group officially disbanded on November 17, 2023 in Puerto Rico.

== History ==
=== 2015: La Banda ===
Erick Brian Colón, Christopher Vélez, Zabdiel De Jesús, Richard Camacho and Joel Pimentel auditioned for the first season of La Banda, a televised singing competition which started on Univision in September 2015, created by Simon Cowell and produced by Ricky Martin. They all received 75% or more votes from the public during auditions except Colón, though he was saved by Martin. The band's members competed individually with other contestants from Latin America and the United States before the show's judges, Martin, Alejandro Sanz and Laura Pausini. The boys had to go through several phases to become the winners. During the competition, they were put into groups, with Camacho and De Jesús in the same band, while Vélez, Colón and Pimentel were in another. The band was formed on the finale of the show, on December 13, 2015, when they received their name, which alludes to the Spanish word for five, "cinco", and is pronounced in English as it is spelled: "C-N-C-O". They won a recording contract of 5 years with Sony Music Latin, and rapper Wisin was scheduled to produce their first album. Martin became their representative.

They performed the song "Devuélveme Mi Corazón" on the finale, which included performances by Pitbull, Fifth Harmony, Wisin, and a video congratulations from One Direction. They sang it again in Times Square at Univision's Feliz 2016 New Year's celebration.

=== 2016: Primera Cita and breakthrough success ===
On January 29, 2016, they released their debut single, "Tan Fácil", which debuted on Billboard's Latin Rhythm Airplay at number 25, number 23 on the Hot Latin Songs chart, and instantly topped the U.S. iTunes Latino charts, later peaking at number one on the Latin Airplay chart. On January 30, 2016, they held their first concert in The Fillmore Miami Beach.

On February 12, CNCO started touring as opening acts on Ricky Martin's One World Tour for some of his shows in the U.S., including Hollywood, Florida San Juan, Puerto Rico, and parts of South America, including Chile and Argentina.

On May 13, they released their second single, "Quisiera", which peaked on Billboard's Hot Latin Songs at number 29, with its music video premiering on June 3. In May, they sang the national anthem at Yankee Stadium. On July 13, the band was nominated for six awards, at Premios Juventud and won five for the Most – "Tan Fácil", My Pop/Rock Artist Producers' Choice Award, My Favorite Twitter Celebrity, and My Favorite Fan-Army; they also performed at the ceremony.

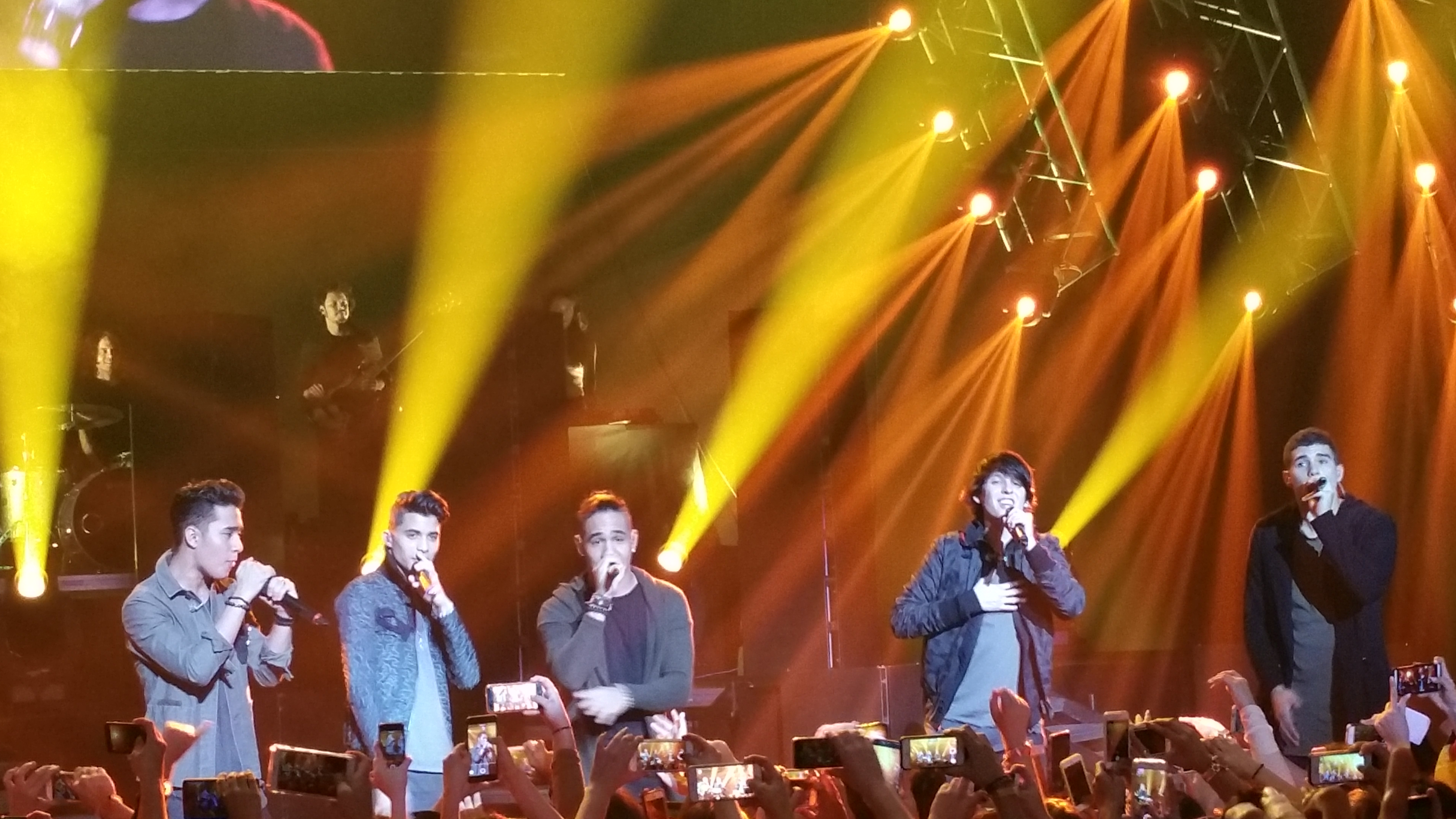
CNCO performing in their first concert in January 2016.

In August, their fans, called "CNCOwners", voted the band first place in Billboard's "Favorite New Latin Boy Band Poll'. On August 23, the group asked fans to locate hotspots for songs from their upcoming album, in a Pokémon Go inspired game, called 'CNCOGo', and Ecuadorian fans found the first song, "Cometa".

On August 26, their first album, Primera Cita produced by Wisin, was released. Wisin spoke about their album saying, "It is a union of countries and cultures. It is what keeps us growing because the people can understand that we can unite different genres." The album has fourteen tracks and includes an urban remix of "Tan Fácil" featuring the rapper, and a ballad version of the song "Quisiera" featuring Spanish singer Abraham Mateo. On its release date, the band met fans while traveling with Ricky Martin on his tour, and they gave a concert at the Miami International Mall to celebrate the album's debut.

In November, they filmed a new music video for one of the songs on Primera Cita, "Para Enamorarte", at the Los Angeles Ramon C. Cortines School of Visual and Performing Arts. It was produced in conjunction with Toyota and included fans who also selected the ending of the video. A video clip was scheduled for airing on La Banda's season finale on December 11, then on Toyota's Latino Facebook page and on YouTube. They also announced plans for their first headlining tour in February 2017 in Latin America. On October 7, they released the single "Reggaetón Lento (Bailemos)", which peaked at number 6 on the Billboard Hot Latin Songs chart and number 11 on the Bubbling Under Hot 100.

=== 2017–2018: Más Allá Tour and CNCO ===
On February 7, 2017, the band was announced as one of four finalists in the category "Artist of the Year, New" for the 2017 Billboard Latin Music Awards, representing artists who charted well over the past year. On February 26 they began their first headlining tour, Más Allá, in Cochabamba, Bolivia, for a total of 15 countries, including 40 performances in Central and South America, Mexico, Portugal, Spain, and the United States. They recorded music for their second album while on tour. On March 24, they were featured on the remix of Becky G's song "Todo Cambió". On April 4, 2017, the group officially released the lead single from their second album, "Hey DJ", featuring Puerto Rican singer Yandel; they also released a solo pop version. They were featured on a remix of Enrique Iglesias' "Súbeme la Radio", released on May 12. On May 26, they were featured on Río Roma's song "Princesa".

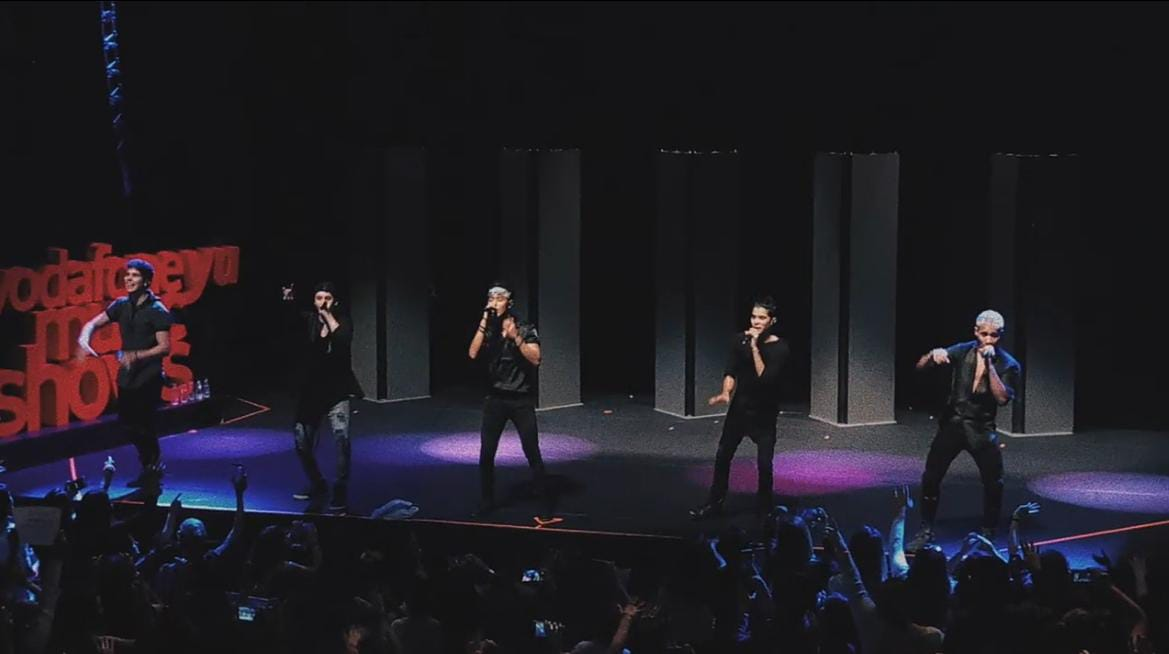
CNCO performing in Spain in 2017.

On August 18, CNCO released a remixed version of "Reggaetón Lento" featuring vocals from British girl group Little Mix as the second single from the record. On October 20, 2017, the group released the third single, "Mamita" from their second album. On March 3, 2018, they released the song, "Mi Medicina", announcing the album's pre-order. It was followed by "Bonita" two weeks later, on March 16, and finally "Fiesta en Mi Casa", also arriving two weeks later, on March 30. The music videos accompanied the songs' releases.

On April 6, 2018, the boy band released their highly anticipated second self-titled album, CNCO. It debuted at number one on the Billboard Top Latin Albums and entered at number 33 on the Billboard 200, succeeding their debut. The group released "Sólo Yo", along with its music video, to celebrate the album's release. On May 16, CNCO signed a new management deal with Walter Kolm Entertainment, after being managed by Ricky Martin for nearly three years. The music video for the fifth single "Se Vuelve Loca" was made available on July 19, with a Spanglish version being released for digital download and streaming several hours later. It reached number one on the Latin Pop Songs Chart in October 2018. The band embarked on the CNCO World Tour, starting in Guatemala. They announced shows in the United States, thus becoming their first U.S. tour. The band released a collaboration with singer-songwriter Prince Royce on October 26, titled "Llegaste Tú". On November 8, the group released a remix version of "Hey DJ", with American singer-songwriter Meghan Trainor and Jamaican artist Sean Paul.

=== 2019: Que Quiénes Somos ===
The band announced the single "Pretend", which was released on February 15, 2019. The song is their first official solo Spanglish release, and samples "Rhythm of the Night" by DeBarge.

CNCO released the single "De Cero" on June 24 along with its music video. They performed a short version of "Pretend" at the Teen Choice Awards of 2019, where they won the Choice Latin Artist and were nominated for Choice Group. Spanish singer-songwriter Abraham Mateo released his song "Me Vuelvo Loco" in collaboration with the boys in July. The group revealed their first extended play, Que Quiénes Somos, in mid-August, along with its cover art. Its title references the line sung by Colón at the end in most of their songs and also alludes as to who the boys are as they co-wrote the EP themselves. They released the first promotional single, titled "Ya Tú Sabes" in the 23rd of the same month. It contains a sample of a song by Cuban salsa singer Celia Cruz and features Latin Trap in its production. The band was announced as part of the line-up for 2019 MTV Video Music Awards pre-show where they performed "De Cero" on August 26. The second promotional song, named "La Ley", was made free on all digital platforms on September 27. Both songs were released with audios on YouTube. The EP was released on October 11, 2019, and includes seven tracks in total. They also released the second single "Pegao" with Colombian singer Manuel Turizo on the same day with a music video. Que Quiénes Somos debuted at No. 1 on the Latin Pop Albums Billboard chart. The group collaborated with fellow boy band PRETTYMUCH on the song "Me Necesita". CNCO performed "Ya Tú Sabes" and "Me Vuelvo Loco" alongside Mateo at the 2019 Latin American Music Awards and also won 2 awards that night. On November 7, the group was featured on the song "Como Así" by Argentinian singer Lali Espósito, which appears on her album, Libra. In the same month, CNCO announced a clothing campaign with Forever 21.

=== 2020–2021: Déjà Vu and Pimentel's departure ===
The band announced their new tour "Press Start" on January 21, 2020. The tour was set to begin on May 30, 2020, at the Coliseo de Puerto Rico in San Juan, Puerto Rico and end in Chicago, Illinois at the Rosemont Theater on June 21, but was postponed to 2021 due to the ongoing 2019-20 coronavirus pandemic. The boys also stated their self-written third studio album would be released in March, but it was pushed back for the same reason. However, they released a single titled "Honey Boo" with Dominican singer Natti Natasha on April 2 along with its music video. The band received two nominations at the 2020 MTV Video Music Awards for Best Quarantine Performance for their MTV Unplugged at Home concert and Best Choreography for "Honey Boo". They also received a nomination for Best Group after voting for the main categories closed. The boys released a song titled "Beso" on August 28 and performed it at the VMAs a week later, this time at the main show. They were announced as winners for Best Quarantine Performance, becoming the first Latin boyband to win a Moonman.

The group stated in November 2020 that they had decided to push back their third album until further notice. Instead, they would release a cover album, composed of Latin pop classics. They released "trailers" on their YouTube channel, revealing the songs covered would be from 1988 until an unknown date. The group released "Tan Enamorados", a song by Ricardo Montaner in the same month. Its music video was inspired by a New Kids on the Block's own, with the band acknowledging the homage. CNCO announced the album, Déjà Vu, with its release date on social media. They released their version of Puerto Rican artist Big Boy's song "Mis Ojos Lloran Por Ti" the following week, with its video being inspired by NSYNC's "Tearin' Up My Heart". The group performed the former song at the Macy's Thanksgiving Day Parade on November 26. In December, they released their cover of "Hero" by Enrique Iglesias, along with a music video inspired by the Backstreet Boys' music video for "Show Me the Meaning of Being Lonely".

On January 31, 2021, CNCO released their rendition of Franco De Vita's 1986 ballad "Solo Importas Tú". On February 5, the group released their new album, Déjà Vu, to digital download and streaming, along with the tracks' audios on their YouTube channel. The release was accompanied by the fifth single, "Dejaría Todo", a cover of Puerto Rican singer, Chayanne. On May 9, 2021, Joel Pimentel announced his exit from the group, citing desires to "grow and explore new artistic venues". The band announced they would continue as a quartet. Their last concert as a fivesome was a virtual concert called "Déjà Vu Global Streaming", which occurred on May 14. A month later, on June 22, the band released "Toa La Noche", their first song as a foursome. They performed the song at 2021 Premios Juventud that same day. They collaborated with Alex Rose for the song "Pa' Que Guaye", released on September 16.

=== 2022–2023: XOXO, 4 Ever, and disbandment ===
On January 13, 2022, the band released "Party, Humo & Alcohol", their second song as a foursome, which has garnered more than ten million views on YouTube. On February 3, it was announced that the group would make their acting debut on an upcoming musical miniseries on Disney+ titled 4 Ever, which was originally set to release in the fall of the same year, but eventually came out on October 11, 2023. On April 8, the band released the single "La Equivocada". On May 13, they appeared on "Teteo" with Maffio and Kiko el Crazy and featured on "Suelta, Sola y Tranquila (Remix)" with Fabro and Mya, which came out on June 17. CNCO released "No Apagues la Luz" and "La Equivocada (Versión Tumbao)" with Adriel Favela on June 23.

On July 20, the boyband released the single “Plutón” with Mexican singer Kenia OS, alongside its music video. Later that month, they performed the song at Premios Juventud, with the last-minute absence of Kenia Os due to her testing positive to COVID-19. While accepting the award for "Best Fandom" at the ceremony, the group announced that they would be disbanding in a year and a half from the current date. On August 24, they released the single "Miami" featuring Beele. Their last album XOXO was released on August 26. They collaborated with Venezuelan singer Nacho on the song "Ferrari", released on September 30. On November 25, they appeared on the song "MUSIKITA" with singer Reggi El Autentico. Singer Alejo released the single "Estrella" with the group on December 8. The boyband released the song "Ay Dios" on the 16th of the same month.

Their first song of 2023 was "Diferente" with music producer and DJ Steve Aoki, released on February 3 as a single from his album HiROQUEST: Double Helix. This was followed by "Borrachita" with Symon Dice, released on the 9th of that month. On the 16th, they released the single "Extraños" with Gera Demara. The boyband's final single as the only artists on the track was "La Ultima Canción", which was released on May 3, 2023. They then embarked on their farewell tour called La Ultima Cita (Eng. The Last Date), a callback to their first album, which began in La Paz, Bolivia on May 9. Nine days later, they released "Tu Me Elevas" with singer Aron Luix.

On July 5, they released the first single from the soundtrack to their Disney+ series 4Ever, titled "Para Siempre". On July 20, Venezuelan duo Mau y Ricky released their album Desgenerados Mixtape, which contained the track "Vivir Sin Ti", with CNCO, a highly-anticipated collaboration. On October 8, the band released the second single from the show's soundtrack, titled "Fuego", alongside a music video. On October 11, their series 4Ever, premiered on Disney+.

On November 17, 2023, the band gave their last show in Puerto Rico, which was attended by their families. This was followed by their disbandment.

== Former members ==
- Christopher Vélez (30) was born in Newark, New Jersey and grew up in Ecuador.
- Richard Camacho (29) is Dominican and from New York.
- Zabdiel De Jesús (28) is from Bayamón, Puerto Rico.
- Erick Brian Colón (25) is from Havana, Cuba.
- Joel Pimentel (27) was born in Hesperia, California.

== Reception ==
Griselda Flores of Billboard said the band is "taking the torch and leading a new boy band era", like prior Latino bands Magneto, Menudo, Uff!, and Salserín.

== Discography ==
=== Studio albums ===
- Primera Cita (2016)
- CNCO (2018)
- Déjà Vu (2021)
- XOXO (2022)

=== Extended plays ===
- Que Quiénes Somos (2019)

== Concert tours ==
=== Headlining ===
- 2016-2017: Más Allá Tour
- 2019: CNCO World Tour
- 2020: Press Start Tour (cancelled due to the COVID-19 pandemic)
- 2021: Toa La Noche: Club Tour
- 2023: La Última Cita Tour

=== As opening act ===
- 2016: Ricky Martin - Ricky Martin's One World Tour
- 2017: Ariana Grande – Dangerous Woman Tour
- 2017: Enrique Iglesias & Pitbull - Enrique Iglesias and Pitbull Live
- 2022: Tini - Tini Tour 2022
