= CNCO (album) =

Studio album by CNCO
- Released: April 6, 2018
- Genre: Latin pop; reggaeton
- Label: Sony Music Latin

CNCO chronology
Primera Cita (2016)	CNCO (2018)	Que Quiénes Somos (2019)

Singles from CNCO
- 1. "Hey DJ" Released: April 4, 2017; 2. "Reggaetón Lento (Remix)" Released: August 18, 2017; 3. "Mamita" Released: October 20, 2017; 4. "Sólo Yo" Released: April 6, 2018; 5. "Se Vuelve Loca" Released: July 19, 2018

CNCO is the self-titled second studio album by the Latin American boy band CNCO, released on April 6, 2018, via Sony Latin. Like their debut, it features Latin pop and reggaeton songs. The album debuted at the top of the Billboard Top Latin Albums and in the top forty of the Billboard 200.

== Background ==
In February 2018, CNCO presented the album cover and announced that pre-orders for the album would begin in early March of that year, alongside the promotional single "Mi Medicina".

== Composition ==
The album was recorded while the band was on a world tour and at their home base in Miami. Edgar Barrera, Icon Music, The Swaggernautz, David Cabrera, Mario Caceres, Yasmil Marrufo, Andy Clay, Frank Santofimio, Dabruk Matt Rad, Max Borghetti and Pinto Wahin all collaborated with the group on the work. The group gained some creative control, with three of the members, Pimentel, Colón and De Jesús co-writing the song "Bonita", while the former co-wrote "No Me Sueltes"; both songs were also co-written with Camacho's brother, Yashua.

== Singles ==
On 4 April 2017, CNCO released "Hey DJ" as the lead single from the album. The song was released in two versions, with the original featuring Yandel. The second version was titled the "Pop Version", and was released solo. The music video was released on 28 April 2017 as of June 2021 has amassed over 343 million views. on YouTube. "Hey DJ" charted at number fourteen on the US Latin chart and was certified 6× Platinum.

A remix of "Reggaetón Lento (Bailemos)", alongside British girl group Little Mix was released on 18 August 2017 as the second single from the album. The song became CNCO's first hit in the United Kingdom, where it debuted and peaked at number five. The video was released on 17 September 2017 and as of June 2021 has amassed over 338 million views. "Reggaetón Lento" was certified platinum in the United Kingdom.

"Mamita" was released as the third single on 20 October 2017. The music video was released on 18 January 2018 and as of May 2019 has achieved over 120 million views. A remix featuring Luan Santana was released on 23 March 2018 alongside a music video. The video was directed by Daniel Duran and filmed in Quito, Ecuador.

"Sólo Yo" was the fourth single from the album. Its music video was released on 5 April 2018 to coincide with the album's release.

"Se Vuelve Loca" was the fifth single from the album. Its music video was released on 19 July 2018. A Spanglish version of the song was released on 20 July 2018 but was not included on the album.

=== Promotional singles ===
Before the release of the album, three promotional singles were released. "Mi Medicina" was available on 2 March 2018 alongside the album pre-order. Its music video was released on the same day. "Bonita" was released as the second promotional single on 16 March 2018, with its music video also released on the same day. "Fiesta en Mi Casa" served as the final promotional single, arriving on 30 March 2018, a week before the album release. Once again, its music video arrived on the same day.

== Accolades ==
Year	Award	Category	Result
2018	Latin American Music Awards	Favorite Pop/Rock Album	Won
2019	Billboard Latin Music Awards	Latin Pop Album of the Year	Won

== Track listing ==
No.	Title	Writer(s)	Length
1.	"Sólo Yo"	Crysthian Adalberto Fermin Peralta; Emiliano Vásquez; José Alberto Roble Ramírez; Juan M. Frias; Max Borghetti	2:48
2.	"Hey DJ" (with Yandel)	Edgardo Miranda; Edgar Barrera; Llandel Veguilla; Marco Masis; Jeannelyz Marcano	3:27
3.	"Se Vuelve Loca"	Yasmil Marrufo; Mario Cáceres	3:12
4.	"Mamita"	Salomón Villada Hoyos (Feid); Johan Esteban Espinosa (Jowan); Carlos Alejandro Patiño (Mosty); Andrés David Restrepo (Rolo); Claudia Brant; Juan Pablo Piedrahita; Daniel Giraldo	2:54
5.	"Fiesta en Mi Casa"	Ender Zambrano; Oscar Hernández; Jorge Luis Chacin	3:30
6.	"Noche Inolvidable"	Frank Santofimio; Silverio Lozada; Andy Clay; Cáceres; Marrufo	3:28
7.	"Bonita"	Feid; Jowan; Mosty; Rolo; Giraldo; Joel Pimentel; Erick Brian Colon; Zabdiel De Jesus; Yashua Camacho	3:11
8.	"Estoy Enamorado de Ti"	Jovany Javier Barreto; Luis Alfredo Salazar; Tat Tong; Jesús "DalePlay" Herrera; Dave Siegel; Sam Nicolosi	3:28
9.	"Mala Actitud"	Milton J. Restituyo; Juan A. Abreu; Yonathan Then; Rodolfo Jaquez; Salim Asêncio	3:08
10.	"Mi Medicina"	Bruno Nicolás Fernández; José Luis de la Peña Mira; David Augustave Picanes; María Josefa Fernández Campo	3:35
11.	"Fan Enamorada"	Ricardo Montaner	3:59
12.	"No Me Sueltes"	Feid; Jowan; Mosty; Rolo; Giraldo; Camacho; Pimentel	2:57
13.	"Demuéstrame"	Pinto (Wahin); Miguel A. Arias; Raúl Cabrera; Juanma Leal	3:02
14.	"Reggaetón Lento" (Remix with Little Mix)	Luis Angel O'Neill; Jadan Andino; Eric Pérez; Jorge Class; Jean Rodriguez; Camille Purcell	3:09
Total length:			45:42

== Charts ==
=== Weekly charts ===
Chart (2018)	Peak position
Italian Albums (FIMI)	30
Japan Hot Albums (Billboard Japan)	37
Japanese Albums (Oricon)	44
Mexican Albums (AMPROFON)	2
Portuguese Albums (AFP)	11
Spanish Albums (PROMUSICAE)	3
Swiss Albums (Schweizer Hitparade)	76
US Billboard 200	33
US Top Latin Albums (Billboard)	1
US Latin Rhythm Albums (Billboard)	1
Venezuelan Albums (Recordland)	2

=== Year-end charts ===
Chart (2018)	Position
Mexican Albums (AMPROFON)	42
US Top Latin Albums (Billboard)	21
Chart (2019)	Position
US Top Latin Albums (Billboard)	44

== Certifications ==
Region	Certification	Certified units/sales
Argentina (CAPIF)	Gold	10,000^{^}
Brazil (Pro-Música Brasil)	Gold	20,000^{‡}
Mexico (AMPROFON)	Platinum+Gold	90,000^{‡}
United States (RIAA)	Platinum (Latin)	60,000^{‡}
^{^} Shipments figures based on certification alone.^{‡} Sales+streaming figures based on certification alone.

== CNCO World Tour ==
CNCO World Tour
- Tour by CNCO
- Associated album: CNCO
- Start date: October 6, 2018
- End date: December 7, 2019
- Legs: 3
- No. of shows: 15 in South America; 13 in North America; 2 in Europe; 30 in Total

CNCO concert chronology
- Más Allá Tour (2017); CNCO World Tour (2018-2019); Press Start Tour (2020)

The boyband embarked on the CNCO World Tour to support the album. It included three legs: Latin America, North America and Europe. The tour started on October 6, 2018, in Guatemala ended on December 7, 2019, in Santo Domingo, Dominican Republic.

=== Setlist ===
1. Intro
2. "Hey DJ"
3. "Mi Medicina"
4. "Estoy Enamorado de Tí"
5. "Bonita"
6. "Solo Yo"

Interlude

1. "Tan Fácil"
2. "Devuélveme mi Corazón"
3. "Noche Inolvidable" / "Volverte a Ver"
4. "No me Sueltes" / "Mala Actitud"

Interlude

1. "Tu Luz"
2. "Cometa" / "Primera Cita"

Interlude

1. "Fan Enamorada"

Interlude

1. "Reggeatón Lento Remix"
2. "Quisiera"
3. "Súbeme La Radio Remix"
4. "Quisiera Alejarme Remix"
5. "Diganle Remix"
6. "Demúestrame"
7. "Mamita"
8. "Para Enamorarte"
9. "Se Vuelve Loca"

== See also ==
- 2018 in Latin music
- List of number-one Billboard Latin Albums from the 2010s

== Notes ==
1. This song was replaced by "Llegaste Tú" in the US leg of the tour.
