= Hey DJ (CNCO song) =

2017 song by CNCO

Single by CNCO

from the album CNCO
- Language: Spanish
- Released: April 4, 2017
- Genre: Latin pop; reggaeton
- Length: 3:25; 3:06 (solo version)
- Label: Sony Latin
- Songwriters: Edgardo Miranda; Edgar Barrera; Llandel Veguilla; Marco Masis; Jeannelyz Marcano

CNCO singles chronology
"Todo Cambio (Remix)" (2017)	"Hey DJ" (2017)	"Reggaetón Lento (Remix)" (2017)

Yandel singles chronology
"Take It Off" (2016)	"Hey DJ" (2017)	"Mi Religión" (2017)

Music video
- "Hey DJ" on YouTube

"Hey DJ" is a song by American-Latin boy band CNCO. Two versions of the song were released: a solo pop version, and a reggaeton version with additional vocals by Puerto Rican singer Yandel. The first one was released on April 4, 2017, with the second one being released two days later, on April 6, through Sony Music Latin. The version with Yandel was released as the lead single of their eponymous second studio album, CNCO.

== Track listings ==
Digital download
No.	Title	Length
1.	"Hey DJ" (Pop Version)	3:06

Digital download
No.	Title	Length
1.	"Hey DJ" (feat. Yandel)	3:25

Digital download
No.	Title	Length
1.	"Hey DJ" (with Tinie Tempah)	3:30

== Live performances ==
The boy band performed "Hey DJ" with Yandel for the first time on television at the Billboard Latin Music Awards of 2017, where they took home three awards, including Best New Artist.

== Charts ==
=== Weekly charts ===
Chart (2017)	Peak position
Argentina (Monitor Latino)	3
Bolivia (Monitor Latino)	1
Chile (Monitor Latino)	5
Colombia (National-Report)	33
Ecuador (Monitor Latino)	7
Ecuador (National-Report)	2
El Salvador (Monitor Latino)	9
Guatemala (Monitor Latino)	2
Latin America (Monitor Latino)	7
Mexico (Billboard Mexican Airplay)	3
Panama (Monitor Latino)	4
Paraguay (Monitor Latino)	3
Peru (Monitor Latino)	5
Portugal (AFP)	93
Spain (PROMUSICAE)	6
Uruguay (Monitor Latino)	2
US Hot Latin Songs (Billboard)	14
US Latin Airplay (Billboard)	9
US Latin Rhythm Airplay (Billboard)	6

=== Year-end charts ===
Chart (2017)	Position
Argentina (Monitor Latino)	9
Spain (PROMUSICAE)	21
US Hot Latin Songs (Billboard)	23
Chart (2018)	Position
Argentina (Monitor Latino)	95

== Certifications ==
Region	Certification	Certified units/sales
Argentina (CAPIF)	2× Platinum	40,000^{*}
Brazil (Pro-Música Brasil)	Gold	30,000^{‡}
Italy (FIMI)	Gold	25,000^{‡}
Mexico (AMPROFON)	Diamond+2× Platinum	420,000^{‡}
Spain (Promusicae)	3× Platinum	120,000^{‡}
United States (RIAA)	7× Platinum (Latin)	420,000^{‡}
Streaming
Chile (Profovi)	Platinum	8,000,000
^{*} Sales figures based on certification alone.^{‡} Sales+streaming figures based on certification alone.

== Meghan Trainor and Sean Paul remix ==
"Hey DJ"

Single by CNCO, Meghan Trainor and Sean Paul
- Language: Spanish; English; Jamaican Patois
- Released: November 9, 2018
- Genre: Latin pop; reggaeton
- Length: 3:09
- Label: Sony Latin
- Songwriters: Meghan Trainor; Sean Paul Henriques; Édgar Barrera; Chris Wallace; Edgardo Miranda; Matt Radosevich; Sofi de la Torre
- Producers: Édgar Barrera; Matt Rad

CNCO singles chronology
"Llegaste Tú" (2018)	"Hey DJ" (2018)	"Pretend" (2019)

Meghan Trainor singles chronology
"More than Friends" (2018)	"Hey DJ" (2018)	"All the Ways" (2019)

Sean Paul singles chronology
"Naked Truth" (2018)	"Hey DJ" (2018)	"Shot & Wine" (2019)

A remix of "Hey DJ" by CNCO, American singer-songwriter Meghan Trainor and Jamaican artist Sean Paul was released on November 9, 2018, by Sony Music Latin.

=== Music video ===
The music video was released on November 16, 2018. It features the band arriving in suits to a party in a mansion. They are seen celebrating and interacting with other guests. The artists also perform on a small stage outside the house.

=== Charts ===
==== Weekly charts ====
Chart (2018–2019)	Peak position
Belgium (Ultratop 50 Wallonia)	22
France (SNEP)	53
Hungary (Rádiós Top 40)	28
Hungary (Single Top 40)	24
Poland Airplay (ZPAV)	5
Portugal Digital Song Sales (Billboard)	8
Romania (Airplay 100)	9
Switzerland (Schweizer Hitparade)	95
Ukraine Airplay (TopHit)	25

==== Year-end charts ====
Chart (2019)	Position
Belgium (Ultratop Wallonia)	95
Poland (ZPAV)	44

=== Certifications ===
Region	Certification	Certified units/sales
Brazil (Pro-Música Brasil)	Gold	20,000^{‡}
France (SNEP)	Platinum	200,000^{‡}
Italy (FIMI)	Platinum	50,000^{‡}
Poland (ZPAV)	2× Platinum	40,000^{‡}
Portugal (AFP)	Platinum	10,000^{‡}
Spain (Promusicae)	Gold	30,000^{‡}
^{‡} Sales+streaming figures based on certification alone.
