= Reggaetón Lento (Bailemos) =

2016 single by CNCO

Single by CNCO

from the album Primera Cita
- Released: August 26, 2016
- Genre: Latin pop, Reggaeton
- Length: 3:42
- Label: Sony Latin
- Songwriters: Eric Perez; Jadan Andino; Jorge Class; Yashua Camacho
- Producers: Eric Perez; Jorge Class; Luis Angel O'Neill

CNCO singles chronology
"Qusiera" (2016)	"Reggaetón Lento (Bailemos)" (2016)	"Para Enamorarte" (2016)

Music video
- "Reggaetón Lento (Bailemos)" on YouTube

"Reggaetón Lento (Bailemos)" is a song by Latin American boy band CNCO. It was released on August 26, 2016, as the third single from their debut studio album, Primera Cita (2016). The song was written by Eric Perez, Jadan Andino, Jorge Class and Yashua Camacho. As of September 2025, the video has received over 1.8 billion views on YouTube. On August 18, 2017, the group released an English-language remix of the song recorded with British girl group Little Mix.

== Music video ==
The song's music video was released along with the single. The clip sees the boys playing at a bowling alley and meeting and trying to impress some girls. It also features scenes of the group performing the song with choreography and solo shots of the guys singing their individual parts.

== Charts ==
=== Weekly charts ===
Chart (2016–18)	Peak position
Argentina (Monitor Latino)	2
Argentina Digital (CAPIF)	1
Bolivia (Monitor Latino)	3
Brazil Pop Airplay (Billboard Brasil)	15
Bulgaria (PROPHON)	1
Chile (Monitor Latino)	1
Colombia (National-Report)	6
Czech Republic Airplay (ČNS IFPI)	82
Ecuador (Monitor Latino)	9
Ecuador (National-Report)	1
El Salvador (Monitor Latino)	15
Guatemala (Monitor Latino)	2
Italy (FIMI)	55
Mexico (Billboard Mexican Airplay)	1
Panama (Monitor Latino)	2
Paraguay (Monitor Latino)	2
Peru (Monitor Latino)	5
Portugal (AFP)	58
Slovenia (SloTop50)	3
Spain (Promusicae)	2
Uruguay (Monitor Latino)	3
US Bubbling Under Hot 100 (Billboard)	11
US Hot Latin Songs (Billboard)	6
US Latin Airplay (Billboard)	4
US Pop Airplay (Billboard)	35
Venezuela (National-Report)	32
Venezuela (Record Report)	49

=== Year-end charts ===
Chart (2016)	Position
Spain (PROMUSICAE)	61

Chart (2017)	Position
Argentina (CAPIF)	8
Argentina (Monitor Latino)	7
Italy (FIMI)	57

Chart (2018)	Position
Iceland (Plötutíóindi)	70

== Certifications ==
Region	Certification	Certified units/sales
Canada (Music Canada)	Platinum	80,000^{‡}
France (SNEP)	Platinum	200,000^{‡}
Italy (FIMI)	3× Platinum	150,000^{‡}
Mexico (AMPROFON)	2× Diamond+2× Platinum	720,000^{‡}
Spain (Promusicae)	6× Platinum	240,000^{‡}
United States (RIAA)	5× Platinum (Latin)	300,000^{‡}
Streaming
Chile (Profovi)	2× Platinum	16,000,000
^{‡} Sales+streaming figures based on certification alone.

== Release history ==
Date	Version	Format	Label
August 26, 2016	Album version	Digital download; streaming	Sony Latin
February 17, 2017	Zion & Lennox remix	Digital download; streaming	Sony Latin

== Little Mix remix ==
"Reggaetón Lento (Remix)"

Single by CNCO and Little Mix

from the album CNCO
- Language: Spanish; English
- Released: August 18, 2017
- Genre: Latin pop
- Length: 3:08
- Label: Sony; Syco
- Songwriters: Luis Angel O'Neill; Eric Perez; Jadan Andino; Jorge Class; Yashua Camacho; Jean Rodríguez (add.); Camille Purcell (add.)
- Producers: Eric Perez; Jorge Class; Luis Angel O'Neill; Matt Rad (add.)

CNCO singles chronology
"Hey DJ" (2017)	"Reggaetón Lento (Remix)" (2017)	"Mamita" (2017)

Little Mix singles chronology
"Power" (2017)	"Reggaetón Lento (Remix)" (2017)	"Only You" (2018)

Music video
- "Reggaetón Lento (Remix)" on YouTube

CNCO recorded an English-language remix of the song with British girl group Little Mix. It was released on August 18, 2017, through Sony Music and Syco Music. The remix version is included on the reissue of Little Mix's fourth studio album, Glory Days: The Platinum Edition (2017), and on CNCO's self-titled second studio album (2018).

"Reggaetón Lento (Remix)" is a reggaeton and latin pop song, with lyrics that addresses themes of love and romance. The song topped the charts in Romania and the Bulgaria World chart. It reached number five in the United Kingdom, becoming CNCO's first top ten single in that country and Little Mix's twelfth. It reached the top ten of the charts in eleven other territories including the Netherlands, Hungary, and Lebanon.

The song received its debut performance during the final of The X Factor UK in 2017. The song won "Best Remix" at the 2018 iHeartRadio Music Awards. It has since received one triple platinum, two double platinum, three platinum and four gold music certifications worldwide.

=== Background and release ===
The collaboration was announced a day before the release on the social media accounts of both groups, with Billboard magazine saying "As far as bilingual remixes go, this one will be huge."

=== Music video ===
The music video to the remix was released on September 18, 2017, on Little Mix's Vevo YouTube channel. It was directed by Marc Klasfeld and is set in a club where the two groups dance across the floor from each other. As of June 2021 the music video has received over 300 million views on YouTube.

=== Live performances ===
Both groups performed the single for the first time on television during the UK version of the final of series 14 of the UK's version of The X Factor, on December 3, 2017.

=== Commercial performance ===
The song reached number one in Romania and the Bulgaria World charts, becoming Little Mix's first number-one single in those countries. In the United Kingdom the song debuted at number five on the Official UK Singles Chart, becoming CNCO's first and Little Mix's twelfth top ten hit there.

Elsewhere the song reached the top ten in five other countries, including Belgium (Flanders), Lebanon, and the Netherlands. It peaked within the top twenty on the Argentina Anglo chart, Ireland, Mexico Ingles Airplay chart, Spain, and Switzerland. It reached the top forty in five other territories and charted in a further ten additional countries including Germany, Brazil, and Canada.

"Reggaetón Lento (Remix)" was the sixteenth-best selling single by a girl group in the United Kingdom between 1994 and 2019, and Little Mix's sixth-most successful single there. The song has been certified triple platinum in Brazil, double platinum in the Netherlands and the United Kingdom, and has received three platinum and four gold music certifications in other countries.

=== Charts ===
==== Weekly charts ====
Chart (2017–2018)	Peak position
Argentina Anglo (Monitor Latino)	15
Australia (ARIA)	68
Austria (Ö3 Austria Top 40)	53
Belgium (Ultratop 50 Flanders)	8
Belgium (Ultratip Bubbling Under Wallonia)	19
Brazil Hot 100 Airplay (Billboard Brasil)	76
Bulgaria (PROPHON)	1
Canada (Canadian Hot 100)	96
CIS Airplay (TopHit)	197
Croatia International Airplay (Top lista)	28
Czech Republic Singles Digital (ČNS IFPI)	60
Euro Digital Songs (Billboard)	4
Finland Digital Song Sales (Billboard)	8
Finland Download (Latauslista)	5
France (SNEP)	62
Germany (GfK)	96
Hungary (Dance Top 40)	13
Hungary (Rádiós Top 40)	2
Hungary (Single Top 40)	8
Hungary (Stream Top 40)	36
Ireland (IRMA)	14
Italy (FIMI)	32
Japan Hot 100 (Billboard)	55
Lebanon (Lebanese Top 20)	7
Mexico (Billboard Ingles Airplay)	11
Netherlands (Dutch Top 40)	2
Netherlands (Mega Top 50)	3
Netherlands (Single Top 100)	9
New Zealand Heatseekers (RMNZ)	4
Panama Anglo (Monitor Latino Anglo)	2
Philippines (Philippine Hot 100)	33
Poland Airplay (ZPAV)	27
Portugal (AFP)	23
Romania (Airplay 100)	1
Scottish Singles Sales (Official Charts)	2
Slovakia Airplay (ČNS IFPI)	63
Slovakia Singles Digital (ČNS IFPI)	25
Slovenia (SloTop50)	2
Spain (PROMUSICAE)	14
Spain Digital Song Sales (Billboard)	1
Sweden Heatseeker (Sverigetopplistan)	1
Switzerland (Schweizer Hitparade)	18
Switzerland Digital Sales (Billboard)	8
UK Singles (Official Charts)	5
US Bubbling Under Hot 100 (Billboard)	3
US Hot Latin Songs (Billboard)	6
US Pop Airplay (Billboard)	35

==== Year-end charts ====
Chart (2017)	Position
Belgium (Ultratop Flanders)	92
Netherlands (Dutch Top 40)	22
Netherlands (Single Top 100)	86
Portugal (AFP)	85
Romania (Airplay 100)	85
UK Singles (Official Charts Company)	55
US Hot Latin Songs (Billboard)	8
Chart (2018)	Position
Belgium (Ultratop Flanders)	76
Hungary (Dance Top 40)	25
Hungary (Rádiós Top 40)	39
Hungary (Single Top 40)	53
Netherlands (Dutch Top 40)	92
Portugal (AFP)	131
Romania (Airplay 100)	51
Slovenia (SloTop50)	3

=== Certifications ===
Region	Certification	Certified units/sales
Australia (ARIA)	Gold	35,000^{‡}
Belgium (BRMA)	Gold	10,000^{‡}
Brazil (Pro-Música Brasil)	3× Platinum	180,000^{‡}
Denmark (IFPI Danmark)	Gold	45,000^{‡}
Mexico (AMPROFON)	Platinum	60,000^{‡}
Netherlands (NVPI)	2× Platinum	80,000^{‡}
New Zealand (RMNZ)	Gold	15,000^{‡}
Poland (ZPAV)	Platinum	50,000^{‡}
Portugal (AFP)	Platinum	10,000^{‡}
Sweden (GLF)	Gold	20,000^{‡}
Switzerland (IFPI Switzerland)	Platinum	20,000^{‡}
United Kingdom (BPI)	2× Platinum	1,400,000
^{‡} Sales+streaming figures based on certification alone.

=== Release history ===
Region	Date	Format	Label	Ref.
United Kingdom	September 1, 2017	Contemporary hit radio	Sony; Syco	
United States	October 24, 2017	Contemporary hit radio	Columbia	

== See also ==
- List of Airplay 100 number ones of the 2010s
