= Jaden Shackelford =

American basketball player (born 2001)

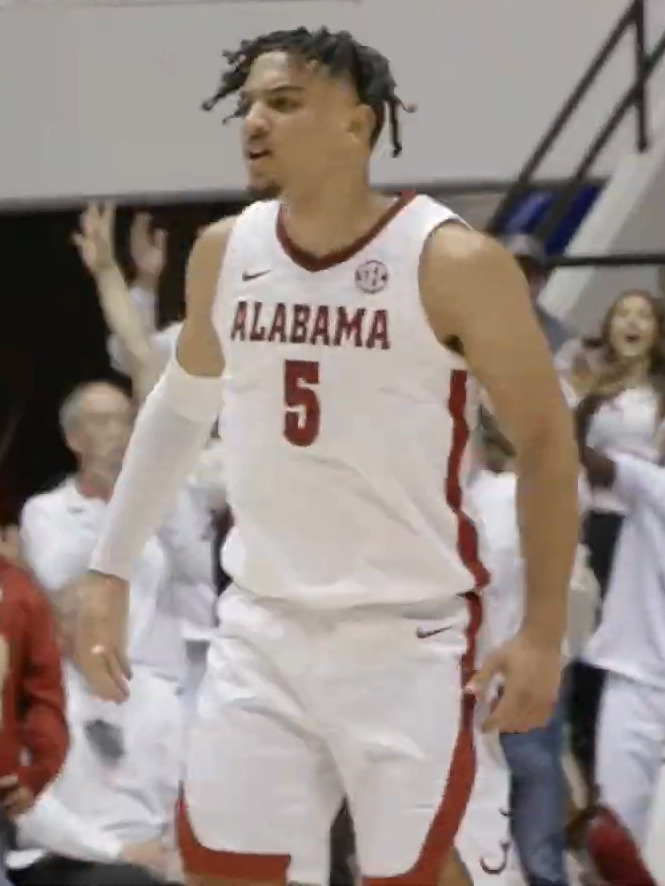
- Shackelford with Alabama in 2022

London Lions
- Position: Point guard / shooting guard

Personal information
- Born: February 14, 2001 (age 25) Hesperia, California, U.S.
- Listed height: 6 ft 3 in (1.91 m)
- Listed weight: 200 lb (91 kg)

Career information
- High school: Hesperia (Hesperia, California)
- College: Alabama (2019–2022)
- NBA draft: 2022: undrafted
- Playing career: 2022–present

Career history
- 2022–2024: Oklahoma City Blue
- 2024–2026: Valley Suns
- 2025: Osos de Manatí
- 2025: NBA G League United
- 2026: San Pablo Burgos
- 2026: Tianjin Pioneers
- 2026–present: London Lions

Career highlights
- NBA G League champion (2024); Second-team All SEC (2022); Second-team All-SEC – Coaches (2021); SEC All-Freshman Team (2020)
- Stats at NBA.com
- Stats at Basketball Reference

Jaden Shackelford (born February 14, 2001) is an American professional basketball player for the London Lions of the British Super League Basketball (SLB). He played college basketball for the Alabama Crimson Tide.

== High school career ==
In his first two years of high school, Shackelford attended Oak Hills High School in Oak Hills, California. For his junior season, he transferred to Hesperia High School in Hesperia, California. Shackelford averaged 34 points, 11 rebounds, 5.5 assists and four steals per game as a senior. He was named Mojave River League MVP and Daily Press Basketball Athlete of the Year. He committed to playing college basketball for Alabama over offers from Kansas State, Pepperdine and UNLV, among others.

== College career ==
On February 12, 2020, Shackelford matched his freshman season-high of 28 points, with eight rebounds and seven three-pointers, in a 95–91 loss to Auburn in overtime. Six days later, he was named USBWA National Freshman of the Week. As a freshman, Shackelford averaged 15 points and 4.5 rebounds per game, earning SEC All-Freshman Team honors. He averaged 14 points, 3.8 rebounds, and 2 assists per game as a sophomore. Shackelford was named to the Second Team All-SEC. Following the season he entered the 2021 NBA draft without hiring an agent, and also entered the transfer portal. Shackelford decided to return to Alabama in July 2021. On February 9, 2022, he posted career-highs of 30 points and eight 3-pointers in a 97–83 win over Ole Miss. Shackelford was named to the Second Team All-SEC as a junior after averaging 16.6 points and 5.4 rebounds per game.

On April 3, 2022, Shackelford declared for the 2022 NBA draft, forgoing his remaining college eligibility.

== Professional career ==
=== Oklahoma City Blue (2022–2024) ===
After going undrafted in the 2022 NBA draft, Shackelford signed an Exhibit 10 contract with the Oklahoma City Thunder on June 24, 2022. On November 3, 2022, Shackelford was named to the opening night roster for the Oklahoma City Blue.

On October 20, 2023, Shackelford signed with the Oklahoma City Thunder, but was waived the same day. On October 31, he re-joined the Oklahoma City Blue. During his second season with them, Shackelford would win the 2024 NBA G League championship while with the Blue.

=== Valley Suns (2024–2026) ===
On September 19, 2024, Shackelford signed an Exhibit 10 deal with the Phoenix Suns, but was waived on September 26. On October 27, he joined the Valley Suns.

=== San Pablo Burgos (2026) ===
On April 2 2026, Shackelford signed for San Pablo Burgos of the Spanish Liga ACB.

=== London Lions (2026–present) ===
On 17 November 2026, Shackelford signed for London Lions of the British Super League Basketball.

== Career statistics ==
Legend
GP	Games played	GS	Games started	MPG	Minutes per game
FG%	Field goal percentage	3P%	3-point field goal percentage	FT%	Free throw percentage
RPG	Rebounds per game	APG	Assists per game	SPG	Steals per game
BPG	Blocks per game	PPG	Points per game	**Bold**	Career high

*	Led NCAA Division I

=== College ===
Year	Team	GP	GS	MPG	FG%	3P%	FT%	RPG	APG	SPG	BPG	PPG
2019–20	Alabama	31	19	**29.4**	**.413**	**.357**	**.768**	**4.5**	1.4	.5	**.2**	**15.0**
2020–21	Alabama	**33***	**32**	29.3	.410	.342	.756	3.8	**2.0**	**.8**	.1	14.0
Career		64	51	29.4	.411	.351	.762	4.1	1.7	.7	.1	14.5

== Personal life ==
Shackelford's father, Anthony, a youth mentor at Abundant Living Family Church. Shackelford is of African American and Dutch descent.
