= Mojave River League =

High school athletic league in California

The Mojave River League is a high school athletic league that is part of the CIF Southern Section. Members are located in the Hesperia and Apple Valley area of San Bernardino County, California, north of Cajon Pass in the San Gabriel Mountains.

== Members ==
- Apple Valley High School
- Burroughs High School
- Hesperia High School
- Oak Hills High School
- Serrano High School
- Sultana High School
