= Piñon Hills, California =

Piñon Hills
- census-designated place
- Location in San Bernardino County and the state of California

- Location within the state of California Piñon Hills (California) Piñon Hills (the United States)
- Coordinates: 34°25′59″N 117°36′54″W
- Country: United States
- State: California
- County: San Bernardino

Area
  - Total: 32.118 sq mi (83.185 km^{2})
  - Land: 32.115 sq mi (83.178 km^{2})
  - Water: 0.0031 sq mi (0.008 km^{2}) 0.01%
- Elevation: 4,173 ft (1,272 m)

Population (2020)
  - Total: 7,258
  - Density: 226.0/sq mi (87.26/km^{2})
- Time zone: UTC-8 (Pacific (PST))
  - Summer (DST): UTC-7 (PDT)
- ZIP codes: 92372
- Area codes: 442/760
- FIPS code: 06-57302
- GNIS feature ID: 2627936

Piñon Hills (from piñón, Spanish for 'pine nut') is a census-designated place in San Bernardino County, California, near the Los Angeles County line. It is located along Pearblossom Highway, 28 miles east of Palmdale, and 15 miles west of the Cajon Pass where Pearblossom Highway meets Interstate 15. The town lies within 25 miles of Hesperia and Victorville. Piñon Hills is in a tri-community that consists of Piñon Hills, Phelan, and Wrightwood. The elevation is 4,173 feet (1,272 m). The population was 7,258 at the 2020 census.

== Corporations and buildings ==
Piñon Hills currently has only one elementary school, Piñon Hills Elementary, which is part of the Snowline Joint Unified School District. Middle school age students attend Piñon Mesa Middle School, and high school age students attend Serrano High School, both located in Phelan. There are alternative education options for students from kindergarten to senior year within the district: Snowline Virtual School, Heritage School, Eagle Summit Community Day School, and Chaparral Continuation High School.

The ZIP Code is 92372, and the community is inside area codes 442 and 760.

== Geography ==
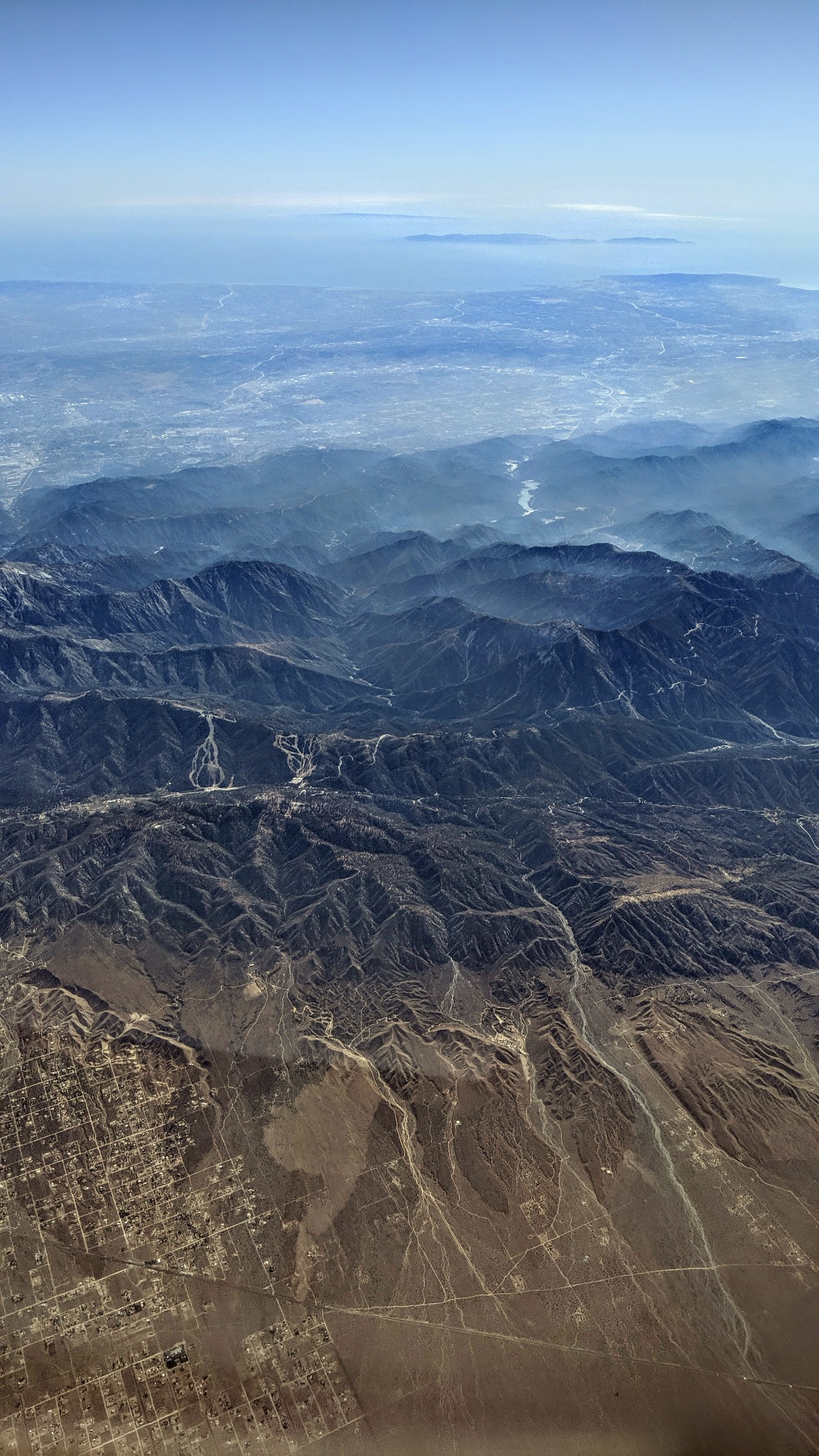
Much of Piñon Hills is visible in the lower left of this aerial view across Mount Baden-Powell in the San Gabriel Mountains, with the Los Angeles Basin beyond.

According to the United States Census Bureau, the CDP covers an area of 32.1 square miles (83.2 km^{2}), 99.99% of it land, and 0.01% of it water.

The Puma Canyon Ecological Reserve (PCER) consists of over 350 acres in Pinon Hills. The reserve is open to the public and it is enjoyed by hikers and horseback riders alike. These communities include; Pinyon-Juniper, Joshua Tree, Desert Wash, Desert Scrub, and Mixed Chaparral (a threatened plant community type). The Reserve is home to abundant and dense woodlands of the state candidate species, the Western Joshua tree.

== Demographics ==
Historical population
Census	Pop.	Note	%±
2010	7,272		—
2020	7,258		−0.2%
U.S. Decennial Census; 1850–1870 1880-1890; 1900 1910 1920; 1930 1940 1950; 1960 1970 1980; 1990 2000 2010

Piñon Hills first appeared as a census designated place in the 2010 U.S. census.

=== 2020 census ===
As of the 2020 census, Piñon Hills had a population of 7,258. The population density was 226.0 inhabitants per square mile (87.3/km^{2}).

The age distribution was 21.1% under the age of 18, 7.1% aged 18 to 24, 22.8% aged 25 to 44, 29.6% aged 45 to 64, and 19.4% who were 65 years of age or older. The median age was 43.9 years. For every 100 females, there were 106.6 males, and for every 100 females age 18 and over there were 105.1 males age 18 and over.

The census reported that 99.8% of the population lived in households, 0.2% lived in non-institutionalized group quarters, and no one was institutionalized. There were 2,624 households, of which 28.7% had children under the age of 18 living in them. Of all households, 52.2% were married-couple households, 21.2% were households with a male householder and no spouse or partner present, and 20.3% were households with a female householder and no spouse or partner present. About 21.9% of all households were made up of individuals, and 10.1% had someone living alone who was 65 years of age or older. The average household size was 2.76, and there were 1,865 families (71.1% of all households).

There were 2,912 housing units at an average density of 90.7 units per square mile (35.0 units/km^{2}), of which 2,624 (90.1%) were occupied. Of these, 78.3% were owner-occupied and 21.7% were occupied by renters. 9.9% of housing units were vacant. The homeowner vacancy rate was 2.0%, and the rental vacancy rate was 4.9%.

0.0% of residents lived in urban areas, while 100.0% lived in rural areas.

Racial composition as of the 2020 census
Race	Number	Percent
White	4,860	67.0%
Black or African American	43	0.6%
American Indian and Alaska Native	83	1.1%
Asian	353	4.9%
Native Hawaiian and Other Pacific Islander	3	0.0%
Some other race	1,121	15.4%
Two or more races	795	11.0%
Hispanic or Latino (of any race)	2,137	29.4%

=== Income and poverty ===
During 2019–2023, Piñon Hills had a median household income of $65,160, with 19.6% of the population living below the federal poverty line.

== Education ==
The CDP is in the Snowline Joint Unified School District.

== Notable people ==
Andy Engman was a Disney animator for over 30 years. He was born in Vaasa, Finland, and he died in Piñon Hills. There is a street named after him called Engman Road.

Kit Galloway was an American video artist and a pioneer in satellite-based telecommunications art. He worked exclusively with Sherrie Rabinowitz under the moniker Mobile Image from 1977 onwards. Kit Galloway lives on a horse ranch at Piñon Hills.

== Events ==
One of the largest Military Simulation Airsoft events in the United States, Operation Lion Claws, is held in the mountains of Piñon Hills, on the Jubilee Boy Scout Ranch.

== See also ==
- Grey Butte Auxiliary Airfield
