= Jamaal Franklin =

American basketball player (born 1991)

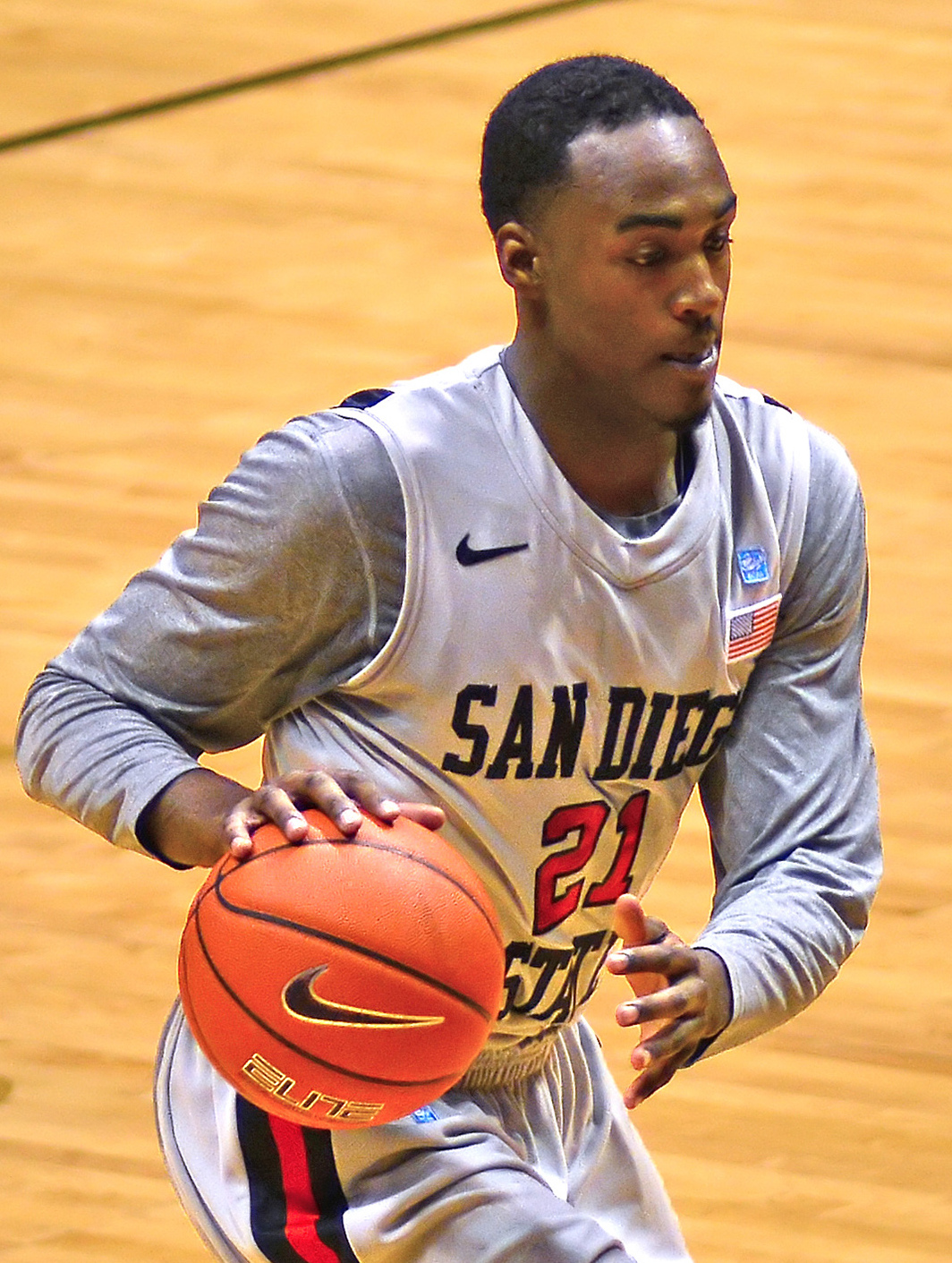
- Franklin with the San Diego State Aztecs in 2012

Free agent
- Position: Shooting guard

Personal information
- Born: July 21, 1991 (age 35) Moreno Valley, California, U.S.
- Listed height: 6 ft 5 in (1.96 m)
- Listed weight: 196 lb (89 kg)

Career information
- High school: Serrano (Phelan, California); Westwind Prep (Phoenix, Arizona)
- College: San Diego State (2010–2013)
- NBA draft: 2013: 2nd round, 41st overall pick
- Drafted by: Memphis Grizzlies
- Playing career: 2013–present

Career history
- 2013–2014: Memphis Grizzlies
- 2014: →Fort Wayne Mad Ants
- 2014–2015: Zhejiang Lions
- 2015: Los Angeles D-Fenders
- 2015: Denver Nuggets
- 2015: Los Angeles D-Fenders
- 2015–2017: Shanxi Brave Dragons
- 2016: Brujos de Guayama
- 2017–2019: Sichuan Blue Whales
- 2019–2021: Shanxi Loongs
- 2021–2022: Shanghai Sharks
- 2023: Converge FiberXers
- 2025: Guangzhou Loong Lions
- 2026: Converge FiberXers

Career highlights
- 2× AP honorable mention All-American (2012, 2013); MWC Player of the Year (2012); 2× First-team All-MWC (2012, 2013)
- Stats at NBA.com
- Stats at Basketball Reference

Jamaal Eric Franklin (born July 21, 1991) is an American professional basketball player who last played for the Converge FiberXers of the Philippine Basketball Association (PBA). Franklin played college basketball for San Diego State, where he was the Mountain West Conference Player of the Year as well as an All-American in his junior season. He was selected with the 41st overall pick in the 2013 NBA draft by the Memphis Grizzlies and spent two seasons in the National Basketball Association (NBA) with the Grizzlies and Denver Nuggets. Franklin played eight seasons in the Chinese Basketball Association from 2014 to 2022. He has also played in the NBA Development League, Puerto Rico and the Philippines.

== Early life ==
Franklin was raised by his mother, Felicia Price. He and Price moved from Los Angeles to the rural town of Phelan, California, when he was aged eight.

== High school career ==
Franklin played four years at Serrano High School in Phelan then played a prep season at Westwind Prep in Phoenix, Arizona. As a senior at Serrano, he led the state of California in scoring at 31.7 points per game and was a two-time All-California Interscholastic Federation selection. In his season at Westwind, he averaged 18.5 points and 6.3 rebounds per game. Franklin was rated as the 24th-best shooting guard in the class of 2009 coming out of Serrano High School and had an ESPN.com grade of 90. Out of high school, Franklin was offered to play basketball at Long Beach State University and San Diego State University.

Franklin played three different sports at Serrano High School: basketball, football (wide receiver and free safety), and track and field, where he was a state high jumper.

== College career ==
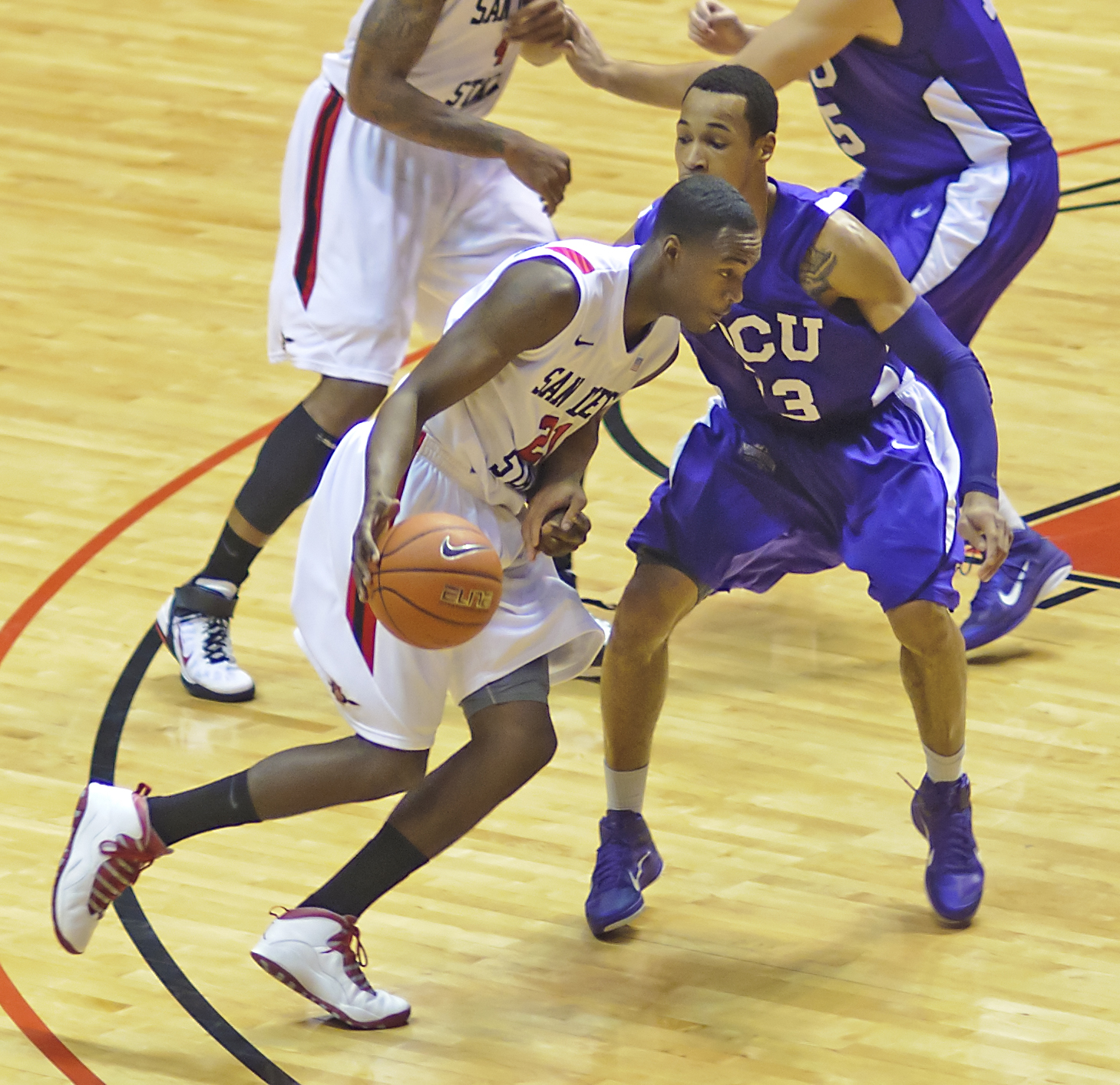
Franklin tries to drive past Garlon Green of TCU in 2011

Franklin enrolled at San Diego State to play for coach Steve Fisher. As a freshman, he was part of arguably the best season in school history, along with teammates Kawhi Leonard and Malcolm Thomas, as the Aztecs went 34–3 and captured a #2 seed in the 2011 NCAA Tournament. Franklin averaged 2.1 points and 1.9 rebounds in 8.1 minutes per game.

In his sophomore campaign, Franklin was thrust into the starting lineup as the Aztecs returned only one starter. He responded by averaging 17.4 points and 7.9 rebounds per game and leading the Aztecs to an unexpected shared regular-season title and a #6 seed in the 2012 NCAA Tournament. Franklin was named Mountain West player of the year and was recognized nationally as an All-American by the Associated Press.

Franklin resisted the lure of the professional ranks and returned to San Diego State in 2012–13 for his junior season. He went on to average 16.9 points and 9.5 rebounds in 32 games.

On April 12, 2013, Franklin announced he would forgo his senior season to enter the NBA draft.

== Professional career ==
=== Memphis Grizzlies (2013–2014) ===
On June 27, 2013, Franklin was selected with the 41st overall pick by the Memphis Grizzlies in 2013 NBA draft. On July 26, 2013, he signed with the Grizzlies despite not appearing for them in the 2013 NBA Summer League. During his rookie season, he had multiple assignments with the Fort Wayne Mad Ants of the NBA Development League.

In July 2014, Franklin joined the Grizzlies for the 2014 NBA Summer League. On August 31, 2014, he was waived by the Grizzlies.

=== Zhejiang Lions (2014–2015) ===
On October 7, 2014, Franklin signed a two-month contract with the Zhejiang Lions of the Chinese Basketball Association. On November 26, 2014, he signed a one-month contract extension with the Lions. Later that day, he scored 53 points on 19-of-29 shooting in Zhejiang's 120–112 win over the Chongqing Flying Dragons. On January 5, 2015, he left Zhejiang after appearing in 26 games. Over those 26 games, he averaged 28.5 points, 6.2 rebounds, 4.6 assists and 1.9 steals per game.

=== Los Angeles D-Fenders (2015) ===
On January 21, 2015, Franklin was acquired by the Los Angeles D-Fenders of the NBA Development League. On February 21, he had a season-best game with 27 points and 13 rebounds in a loss to the Austin Spurs.

=== Denver Nuggets (2015) ===
On April 12, 2015, Franklin signed with the Denver Nuggets. He made his debut for the team later that day, recording one rebound and one assist in a 122–111 win over the Sacramento Kings. On July 13, 2015, he was waived by the Nuggets.

=== Second stint in D-League (2015–2016) ===
On August 29, 2015, Franklin signed with the Guangdong Southern Tigers of the Chinese Basketball Association, but left the team before appearing in a game for them. On December 4, he was reacquired by the Los Angeles D-Fenders.

=== Shanxi Brave Dragons (2015–2016) ===
On December 18, Franklin parted ways with the D-Fenders and signed with the Shanxi Brave Dragons (Shanxi Zhongyu) of the Chinese Basketball Association. On January 10, 2016, Franklin recorded 44 points, 10 rebounds and 20 assists in a 133–123 win over the Jilin Tigers. He dominated the Chinese Basketball Association, averaging incredible numbers during his time with Shanxi. In 19 games, he averaged a triple-double with 33.9 points, 10.8 rebounds and 10.3 assists, in addition to 3.3 steals and 1.5 blocks.

=== Brujos de Guayama (2016) ===
On April 5, 2016, Franklin signed with Brujos de Guayama of the Puerto Rican Baloncesto Superior Nacional. He left the team later that month after appearing in just four games.

=== Third stint in China (2016–2017) ===
In May 2016, Franklin re-signed with the Shanxi Brave Dragons for the 2016–17 season. On November 14, 2016, Franklin scored 61 points, 12 rebounds and 11 assists in a 125–104 win over the Beijing Ducks. Franklin's performance was the first 60-point triple-double in the history of the CBA.

=== Sichuan Blue Whales (2017–2019) ===
In July 2017, Franklin signed with the Sichuan Blue Whales. He re-signed with the team in August 2018.

=== Shanxi Loongs (2019–2021) ===
On July 29, 2019, Franklin agreed to a contract to re-join the Shanxi team, which had been renamed the Shanxi Loongs. On December 10, 2019, Franklin collected a quadruple-double with forty-two points, twelve rebounds, twelve assists and ten steals in a 110–114 loss to the Xinjiang Flying Tigers. He averaged 30.1 points, 9.5 rebounds, 10.1 assists, 2.3 steals and 1.4 blocks per game. On September 12, 2020, Franklin re-signed with the team.

=== Shanghai Sharks (2021–2022) ===
In October 2021, Franklin joined the Shanghai Sharks of the Chinese Basketball Association. He played 40 games for the Sharks during the 2021–22 season. He re-joined the Sharks for the 2022–23 season, but left after nine games.

=== Converge FiberXers (2023) ===
On January 25, 2023, Franklin signed with the Converge FiberXers of the Philippine Basketball Association (PBA) to replace Ethan Rusbatch as the team's import for the 2023 PBA Governors' Cup.

On July 28, 2023, Franklin signed with the Adelaide 36ers of the Australian National Basketball League (NBL) for the 2023–24 season. He was released by the 36ers on September 25, 2023, prior to the start of the regular season.

=== Guangzhou Loong Lions (2025) ===
On March 4, 2025, Franklin signed with the Guangzhou Loong Lions of the Chinese Basketball Association.

== Career statistics ==
Legend
GP	Games played	GS	Games started	MPG	Minutes per game
FG%	Field goal percentage	3P%	3-point field goal percentage	FT%	Free throw percentage
RPG	Rebounds per game	APG	Assists per game	SPG	Steals per game
BPG	Blocks per game	PPG	Points per game	**Bold**	Career high

=== NBA ===
==== Regular season ====
Year	Team	GP	GS	MPG	FG%	3P%	FT%	RPG	APG	SPG	BPG	PPG
2013–14	Memphis	**21**	0	**7.7**	.410	.455	**1.000**	**1.1**	.3	**.2**	.1	**1.9**
2014–15	Denver	3	0	4.3	**.500**	**.500**	–	.7	**1.0**	.0	**.3**	1.0
Career		24	0	7.3	.415	.462	1.000	1.0	.4	.2	.1	1.8

==== Playoffs ====
Year	Team	GP	GS	MPG	FG%	3P%	FT%	RPG	APG	SPG	BPG	PPG
2014	Memphis	2	0	2.0	.000	–	.500	.5	.0	.0	.0	.5
Career		2	0	2.0	.000	–	.500	.5	.0	.0	.0	.5

== Personal life ==
Franklin is the cousin of platinum music producer, Hit-Boy.
