= Lo Blanquito =

Dominican urban music group

- Origin: Dominican Republic
- Genres: Latin urban, dembow, pop
- Years active: c. 2017–2022
- Label: Sony Music Latin
- Past members: Beto Peláez; Lean; Soco Francis; El Sholivery; Miguel Duarte

Lo Blanquito were a Dominican urban music group known for combining Latin urban music, dembow, Caribbean rhythms and pop. The group rose to prominence in the Dominican Republic with songs such as "Party de Popis" and "Telacuti", and later signed with Sony Music Latin in 2018.

The group released the studio albums Sin "S" in 2019 and B.Y.E. in 2021 under Sony Music. In 2019, Lo Blanquito won the Soberano Awards for Revelación del Año. In 2022, member Soco Francis stated that the group project had ended and that its members had taken separate artistic paths.

== History ==
=== Formation and early recognition ===
According to Beto Peláez, the name Lo Blanquito originated after the members, who had been recording individually in the same studio, performed together and used a social-media hashtag that was later adopted by the public.

Early press coverage described the group as being led by Beto Peláez, Soco Francis, El Sholivery, Lean and Miguel Duarte. By mid-2018, several Dominican outlets identified the active quartet as Alberto Peláez (Beto), Leandro Rosas Beras (Lean), Sebastián Rodríguez (Sholivery) and Sócrates Francis Puello (Soco).

The group gained local attention with "Party de Popis" and "Telacuti". In February 2018, El Día described "Party de Popis" as the song that helped introduce the group to the public and reported that they had shared stages with artists including Sebastián Yatra, El Alfa, Noriel, J Álvarez and Jowell & Randy. Listín Diario later described "Telacuti" as the song that turned them into an urban-music phenomenon in the Dominican Republic.

=== Sony Music and Sin "S" ===
In May 2018, Lo Blanquito signed with Sony Music Entertainment. Acento reported that the signing was intended to help the group expand into international markets after the local success of "Telacutí", "A Lo Clásico" and "Party de Popis". Pedro Alegría, Sony Music's A&R director, described the group's proposal as a blend of dembow, Caribbean rhythms and pop.

In July 2018, the group released "Hakuna", written by the members and produced by Mute Cake. The song preceded their first album project under Sony Music.

Lo Blanquito released their debut Sony Music album, Sin "S", on 31 May 2019. The album contained 16 songs and included collaborations with Mozart La Para on "El Coribiri", MYA on "Tú Te Pasaste", Leslie Grace on "La Culpa" and Messiah on "La Esperanza".

=== Later releases and separation ===
In September 2019, "El Coribiri", Lo Blanquito's collaboration with Mozart La Para, led the Hot Song General chart for the Dominican Republic according to Monitor Latino.

The group later released the album B.Y.E. in 2021. In March 2022, Diario Libre reported that Soco Francis had announced the end of the group project. The same report stated that Lo Blanquito had released Sin "S" and B.Y.E. under Sony Music, had collaborated with artists such as Mozart La Para and Crazy Design, and had performed as opening acts as well as staging their own show at the Coliseo Teo Cruz.

== Musical style and public image ==
Lo Blanquito were generally associated with Dominican urban music. Their sound was described in press coverage as youthful and fresh, combining dembow and other Caribbean rhythms with pop. The group's name and image also attracted discussion because they came from a social background outside the traditional barrio environment commonly associated with Dominican urban music; the members framed that criticism as a challenge rather than an obstacle.

== Discography ==
=== Studio albums ===
- Sin "S" (2019)
- B.Y.E. (2021)

=== Selected singles ===
- "Party de Popis"
- "A Lo Clásico"
- "Telacuti"
- "Hakuna"
- "El Coribiri" featuring Mozart La Para
- "Popiwa" featuring Crazy Design
- "La Nena"

== Awards and nominations ==
Year	Award	Category	Result
2019	Soberano Awards	Revelación del Año	Won
