= L26 =

L26 may refer to:

- 60S ribosomal protein L26
- Aero Commander L-26, an American liaison aircraft
- Buick L26 engine, a V6 automobile engine
- Hesperia Airport, in California
- HMS L26, a submarine of the Royal Navy
- Klemm L 26, a German trainer aircraft
- Lectionary 26
- Nissan L26 engine, a straight-six automobile engine
- ORP Ślązak (L26), a destroyer of the Polish Navy
