= Joel Deleón =

American singer (born 1999)

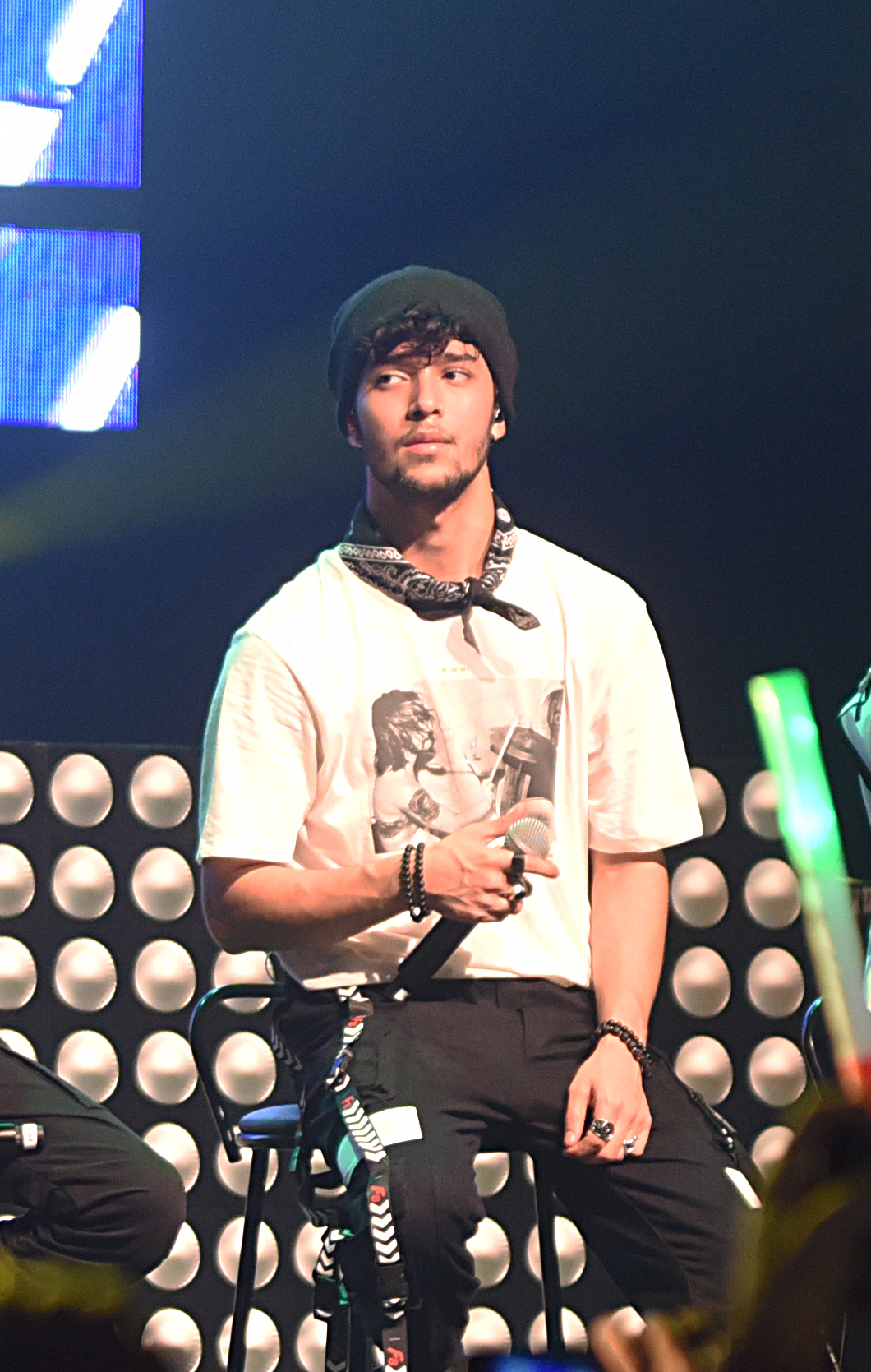
- Deleón in 2019.
- Born: Joel Pimentel de León; February 28, 1999 (age 27); Hesperia, California
- Other name: Joel Pimentel
- Occupations: Singer; songwriter
- Years active: 2015–present
- Musical career
- Genres: Latin pop; Reggaetón
- Instrument: Vocals
- Labels: Sony Latin; WK Entertainment; House Meraki (ind.)
- Formerly of: CNCO
- Website: joeldeleon.net

Joel Pimentel de León (born February 28, 1999), known professionally as Joel Deleón (stylized as Deleōn in all caps), is an American singer. He was a member of the Latin boyband CNCO until his departure in May 2021. He released his debut solo single "La Culpa" in October of that year. His debut extended play (EP), Ahora me escuhan???, was released independently on November 30, 2023.

== Life and career ==
=== 1999–2014: Early life ===
Joel Pimentel de León was born in Hesperia, California on February 28, 1999, the second of four sons of Francisco Pimentel and Patricia de León (born in Guadalajara). He has three brothers, Emanuel, Israel, and Gabriel. He graduated from Hesperia High School, where he used to participate in its plays, and expressed an interest in acting and working in the entertainment industry. He has always mentioned his maternal grandfather as a decisive figure in his musical future.

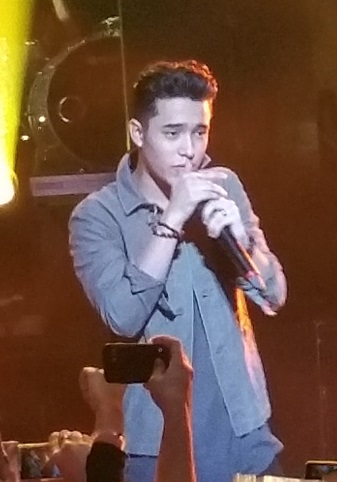
DELEŌN during CNCO's debut concert in January 2016.

=== 2015–2021: La Banda and CNCO ===
Deleón rose to prominence in September 2015 by his name Joel Pimentel in the first season of La Banda. The show was created to find the next big Latin boy band. He competed individually with other contestants from Latin America and the United States before the show's judges, Ricky Martin, Alejandro Sanz and Laura Pausini. The boys went through several phases to win, including being put into several boybands and performing solo. On December 13, the finale of the show, Pimentel, Christopher Velez, Richard Camacho, Erick Brian Colón and Zabdiel De Jesús were chosen to form the boy band CNCO. They won a five-year recording contract with Sony Music Latin and began work on music right after, with Martin working as their representative and Wisin as their producer.

CNCO released their debut album Primera Cita in August 2016, which peaked in the top 40 of the Billboard 200 and at number one on the Billboard Top Latin Albums chart. Its third single, "Reggaetón Lento (Bailemos)" was a commercial success, reaching the top 10 of various Latin American countries and reaching over one billion views on YouTube. Their second studio album, CNCO, was released in April 2018, achieving the same chart success as its predecessor. Pimentel was one of the co-writers on the songs "Bonita" and "No Me Sueltes". The band went on to release their debut EP Qué Quiénes Somos in October 2019, which featured songwriting from all members on almost all the tracks. Their last album as a quintet, Déjà Vu, was released in February 2021 and is a visual cover project featuring classic songs from Latin music. On May 9, 2021, Pimentel announced his exit from the group, citing desires to "grow and explore new artistic venues". CNCO's last concert as a fivesome was the virtual concert called Déjà Vu Global Streaming, which took place on May 14. It was later released as a live album in July.

=== 2019–present ===
Pimentel appeared in the music video of "No Soy Yo" by Argentine singer Emilia Mernes and Puerto Rican rapper Darell, alongside Oriana Sabatini and Johann Vera, released on YouTube on September 2, 2019.

Pimentel chose to use his maternal last name, De León (stylized as DELEŌN), to honor his grandfather, who taught him to sing and initiated his love for music. He released his solo debut single "La culpa" on October 21, 2021. It belongs to the Mexican Regional genre as a nod to his grandfather and Mexican roots. His second single, "COCO", was released on January 27, 2022. This song was more urban-pop, which would be his sound for the next releases. DELEŌN collaborated with Gale, Kat Dahlia, and DallasK on the songwriting and production of the song. For almost the entire year, he struggled with his management, WK Entertainment, which was the team behind CNCO and now Deleón's solo career.

On December 16, he released "IDK Y". Again held back by company struggles, Deleón finally released the song "Blue" on October 26, 2023. He stated that he was now "free" and would have control over his career. This was proven with the November 17th release of "Reggaetón Viejo". On the 24th, he announced his debut extended play (EP), AHORA ME ESCUCHAN???, which was released on the 30th of the same month.

In June 2025, De León released his new single "Piel a piel", meant to mark the beginning of a new artistic phase. With evocative lyrics, the song explores emotional distances, unfinished encounters, and the echo left behind by loves that never quite end.

== Discography ==
=== Extended plays ===
List of extended plays
Title	EP details
AHORA ME ESCUCHAN???	Released: November 30, 2023; Format: Digital download

=== As lead artist ===
List of singles as lead artist, with selected chart positions
Title	Year	Peak chart positions								Album
Title	Year	US Digital	US Latin	US Rhy	FRA	MEX	NZ Hot	SPA	SWI	Album
"La Culpa"	2021	—	—	—	—	—	—	—	—	Non-album singles
"COCO"	2022	—	—	—	—	—	—	—	—	Non-album singles
"IDK Y"	2022	—	—	—	—	—	—	—	—	Non-album singles
"Blue"	2023	—	—	—	—	—	—	—	—	AHORA ME ESCUCHAN???'
"Reggaetón Viejo"	2023	—	—	—	—	—	—	—	—	AHORA ME ESCUCHAN???'
"No Te Veo :/"	2023	—	—	—	—	—	—	—	—	AHORA ME ESCUCHAN???'
"Será" (with Rael Díaz)	2023	—	—	—	—	—	—	—	—	Non-album singles
"Morrita Chimba" (feat. Alan Matheus & SteveVibezz)	2024	—	—	—	—	—	—	—	—	Non-album singles
"Diamante" (with Matt Paris)	2024	—	—	—	—	—	—	—	—	Non-album singles
"Piel a piel"	2025	—	—	—	—	—	—	—	—	Non-album singles
