= COCO (song) =

2022 single

Single by Joel DELEŌN
- Language: Spanish
- Released: January 27, 2022
- Length: 2:41
- Label: Sony Music Latin
- Songwriter(s): Joel Deleōn; Gale; Kat Dahlia; DallasK
- Producer(s): DallasK

Joel DELEŌN singles chronology
"La culpa" (2021)	"COCO" (2022)	"IDK Y" (2022)

Music video
- "COCO" on YouTube

"COCO" is a song by Mexican-American singer Joel DELEŌN. Co-written by the artist alongside Gale, Kat Dahlia, and its producer DallasK, it was released on January 27, 2022.

Its music video includes scenes on the beach and was shot at Mazatlán.
