= Telacuti =

Single by Lo Blanquito

from the album Sin "S"
- Released: March 21, 2018
- Recorded: 2018
- Genre: Latin Urban
- Length: 3:09
- Label: Sony Latin
- Songwriters: Alberto Herminio Pelaez Frappier, Sebastián Rodríguez Senior, Sócrates Rafael Francis Puello, Leandro Rosas Veras
- Producer: Mute Cake

Lo Blanquito singles chronology
"A lo Clásico" (2018)	"Telacuti" (2018)	"Muah" (2018)

"Telacuti" is a song by the Dominican urban artist Lo Blanquito. The song was released on March 21, 2018 by Sony Latin Music and it is the lead single of their debut studio album Sin "S". The track was a commercial success in the Dominican Republic peaking inside the top five of the airplay charts. They toured Central America to promote the track.

== Music video ==
On March 21, 2018, Lo Blanquito uploaded the music video for "Telacuti" on YouTube. It was directed by Crea Fama Inc and filmed in Santo Domingo. The music video has surpassed 10 million views on YouTube.

== Charts ==
Chart (2018)	Peak position
Dominican Republic (Monitor Latino)	5
Dominican Republic Urban Chart (Monitor Latino)	3
