= Snowline Joint Unified School District =

School district in California

Snowline Joint Unified School District SJUSD

Location
- High Desert, California; United States

District information
- Type: School District
- Grades: K-12
- Established: 1982
- Superintendent: Dr. Ryan Holman
- Asst. superintendent(s): Allan Miller; Dennis Zimmerman; Robert Chacon
- Schools: 12<
- Budget: $82,737,875.00 (2017–2018)
- NCES District ID: 0636970

Students and staff
- Students: 7,150
- Teachers: 470

Other information
- Website: www.snowlineschools.com

The Snowline Joint Unified School District (SJUSD) is the school district for part of the Victor Valley in the Mojave Desert and northeastern San Gabriel Mountains, located within San Bernardino County, California.

The district extends into Los Angeles County.

The school district includes all of the Wrightwood, Phelan, and Piñon Hills census-designated places, as well as portions of the municipalities of Hesperia and Victorville and a portion of the Oak Hills CDP. The district has 11 schools, 2 high schools, 3 middle schools, 5 elementary schools and 1 K-8 school.

== History ==
The SJUSD is a combination of local school districts and schools, including: the Wrightwood School District, Phelan School District, Serrano High School, and the Chaparral Continuation High School from the Victor Valley Union High School District.

Seven schools have opened since the unification: Five K-5 elementary schools; one K-8 school of choice; two 6-8 middle schools; one K-12 independent study school, and one 7-12 community day school.

== Schools ==
=== High schools ===
==== Serrano High ====
Serrano High School, located in Phelan, is the main high school for the district. This is the high school for most students coming from Piñon Mesa Middle School, Quail Valley Middle School, and Heritage K-8 school.

==== Chaparral High ====
Chaparral High School, located in Phelan, is a Non-Traditional high school offering Career Technical Education (CTE) for students whose primary goals are to enter the work force upon graduation, for those with alternative home settings (students work to support family) or those who want an accelerated graduation timeline.

=== Middle schools ===
==== Piñon Mesa ====
Piñon Mesa Middle School is the middle school for Wrightwood, Phelan and Piñon Hills. This is the middle school for Wrightwood Elementary, Piñon Hills Elementary and Phelan Elementary.

==== Quail Valley ====
Quail Valley Middle School is the middle school for the area east of Lone Pine Canyon Road and west of Victorville. This middle school is usually for students who went to Baldy Mesa Elementary and Vista Verde Elementary.

==== Heritage K-8 ====
Heritage K-8 school is a request-only school that services all of the district. Students from all middle schools and elementary schools are admitted if they meet grade qualifications.

==== Eagle Summit Community Day ====
Eagle Summit Community Day school is a middle/high school for students who have been arrested or expelled and/or whose behavior is not satisfactory for a normal school environment.

=== Elementary schools ===
- Wrightwood Elementary —is the only school in Wrightwood.
- Phelan Elementary —is one of Phelan's elementary schools.
- Piñon Hills Elementary — the elementary school for Piñon Hills and the West Cajon Valley.
- Baldy Mesa Elementary — for the areas around Baldy Mesa.
- Vista Verde Elementary School — serving the surrounding neighborhood of the same name.
