= Chaparral High School (Phelan, California) =

Coordinates: 34°25′05″N 117°34′34″W

Location
- 9258 Malpaso Road; Phelan, California 92371; United States

Information
- Type: High School
- Motto: Home of the Panthers
- Status: Currently operational
- School district: Snowline Joint Unified School District (SJUSD)
- NCES District ID: 0636970
- NCES School ID: 063697007874
- Principal: Chad Brooks
- Teaching staff: 11.16 (FTE)
- Grades: 9-12
- Enrollment: 152 (2023–2024)
- Student to teacher ratio: 13.62
- Schedule: 8:00-3:00
- Colors: Black, White, Grey
- Mascot: Panthers
- Website: Official website

Chaparral High School is a public high school in the community of Phelan in the Victor Valley of the Mojave Desert, located in San Bernardino County, California.

The high school is within the Snowline Joint Unified School District. It is accredited by the Western Association of Schools and Colleges.

The school's athletic teams are known as the Panthers.

== Description ==
The school is a continuation high school, and was named by the California State Board of Education to be a Model Continuation High School. The school opened in 1982.

Students can take part in after-school clubs like music, poetry and gardening and play competitive sports against other continuation schools. Unlike in most 9-12 high schools, there are no 9th graders attending.

== See also ==
- Education in San Bernardino County, California
- Victor Valley topics
