= Phelan, California =

Unincorporated community in California, United States

Phelan
- Unincorporated community and census-designated place
- Interactive map of Phelan
- Location within the state of California
- Coordinates: 34°25′14″N 117°31′13″W
- Country: United States
- State: California
- County: San Bernardino

Area
  - Total: 60.092 sq mi (155.638 km^{2})
  - Land: 60.092 sq mi (155.638 km^{2})
  - Water: 0 sq mi (0 km^{2}) 0%
- Elevation: 3,993 ft (1,217 m)

Population (2020)
  - Total: 13,859
  - Density: 230.63/sq mi (89.046/km^{2})
- Time zone: UTC-8 (Pacific (PST))
  - Summer (DST): UTC-7 (PDT)
- ZIP codes: 92329, 92371
- Area codes: 442/760
- FIPS code: 06-56826
- GNIS feature ID: 2627935

Phelan is an unincorporated community and census-designated place in San Bernardino County, California, in the Victor Valley of the Mojave Desert, north of the San Gabriel Mountains. The population was 13,859 in the 2020 census.

== History ==
=== Origin ===
Phelan's history dates back to the days of the Mormon Trail, when settlers passed through the area on their way to San Bernardino and points beyond. Phelan was named after Senator James D. Phelan and his brother, John Thomas (J.T) Phelan.

== Geography ==
Situated south of State Route 18 and northeast of State Route 138, the town is 30 miles (48 km) east of Palmdale and 18 miles (29 km) west of Victorville. The area around it is nearly flat desert country dotted with joshua trees and heavy brush.

In 2001, according to a feature in the Los Angeles Times, the town was a "wind-swept, tiny unincorporated town nestled in the shadow of a mountain ski resort, just above the vast expanse that is the Mojave Desert. ... There are no shopping malls here, and the closest movie theater is in Victorville, about 15 miles away." Another Times feature said in 1990:

The town of Phelan is surrounded by wide open spaces. There's no mall, and a visit to the beach or Disneyland requires a day's planning. But there is Phelan's Sunshine Market, and when you don't want to drive 20 minutes to Victorville or the local ski areas, you can gaze at the snow-capped peaks through your picture window.

Phelan, along with Victorville, Hesperia, Apple Valley, and several other towns, is considered part of a region known as the High Desert.

According to the United States Census Bureau, the CDP covers an area of 60.1 square miles (155.6 km^{2}), all of it land.

== Demographics ==
Historical population
| Census | Pop. | Note | %± |
|---|---|---|---|
| 2010 | 14,304 | | — |
| 2020 | 13,859 | | −3.1% |
U.S. Decennial Census; 1850–1870 1880-1890; 1900 1910 1920; 1930 1940 1950; 1960 1970 1980; 1990 2000 2010

=== 2020 census ===
As of the 2020 census, Phelan had a population of 13,859. The population density was 230.6 inhabitants per square mile (89.0/km^{2}).

The age distribution was 23.8% under the age of 18, 8.9% aged 18 to 24, 23.4% aged 25 to 44, 28.1% aged 45 to 64, and 15.8% who were 65 years of age or older. The median age was 39.6 years. For every 100 females there were 106.3 males, and for every 100 females age 18 and over there were 107.5 males age 18 and over.

The census reported that 99.5% of the population lived in households, 60 people (0.4%) lived in non-institutionalized group quarters, and 4 people (0.0%) were institutionalized. 0.0% of residents lived in urban areas, while 100.0% lived in rural areas.

There were 4,500 households, out of which 34.1% included children under the age of 18, 53.9% were married-couple households, 6.7% were cohabiting couple households, 19.2% had a female householder with no partner present, and 20.2% had a male householder with no partner present. About 18.9% of households were made up of individuals, and 8.6% had someone living alone who was 65 years of age or older. The average household size was 3.07. There were 3,386 families (75.2% of all households).

There were 5,033 housing units at an average density of 83.8 units per square mile (32.4 units/km^{2}), of which 4,500 (89.4%) were occupied and 533 (10.6%) were vacant. Of the occupied units, 78.2% were owner-occupied and 21.8% were occupied by renters. The homeowner vacancy rate was 3.9% and the rental vacancy rate was 4.8%.

Racial composition as of the 2020 census
| Race | Number | Percent |
|---|---|---|
| White | 7,925 | 57.2% |
| Black or African American | 224 | 1.6% |
| American Indian and Alaska Native | 222 | 1.6% |
| Asian | 619 | 4.5% |
| Native Hawaiian and Other Pacific Islander | 45 | 0.3% |
| Some other race | 3,036 | 21.9% |
| Two or more races | 1,788 | 12.9% |
| Hispanic or Latino (of any race) | 5,364 | 38.7% |

=== 2010 census ===
Phelan first appeared as a census designated place in the 2010 U.S. census.

=== Demographic estimates ===
In 2023, the US Census Bureau estimated that 11.6% of the population were foreign-born. Of all people aged 5 or older, 74.5% spoke only English at home, 23.1% spoke Spanish, 0.1% spoke other Indo-European languages, 1.8% spoke Asian or Pacific Islander languages, and 0.4% spoke other languages. Of those aged 25 or older, 89.7% were high school graduates and 13.9% had a bachelor's degree.

=== Income and poverty ===
The median household income in 2023 was $83,759, and the per capita income was $28,310. About 10.5% of families and 14.5% of the population were below the poverty line.

== Education ==
The CDP is in the Snowline Joint Unified School District, which also serves Wrightwood, Piñon Hills, a portion of Oak Hills, Baldy Mesa, and the West Cajon Valley. The area's schools include Piñon Mesa Middle School, Serrano High School (named after the Serrano people), Quail Valley Middle School, Baldy Mesa Elementary, Piñon Hills Elementary, Wrightwood Elementary, Vista Verde Elementary, Heritage School, Chaparral High School, Desert View Independent School, Eagle Summit Community Day School, and Phelan Elementary.

In 1972, the town was a part of the Phelan School District, 136 square miles (350 km^{2}) of mostly desert land, with 117 pupils in its elementary school. In April of that year, aggrieved parents kept their children home for one day to protest a decision by the school trustees to bypass popular teacher and acting administrator Carl Rasmussen for appointment as full-time principal of the school.

=== Athletics ===
High school football featuring the local team, the Diamondbacks, has been an important part of Phelan's social life. An active youth sports program has provided a "feeder system" for the high school athletes.

== Library ==
Phelan is served by two branch libraries of the San Bernardino County system. The first is a shared facility at Serrano High School, and the second, a 5,000-square-foot (460 m^{2})-building at Lindero Street and Clovis Road, was opened in August 2009. The first memorial library in the county system, the facility is dedicated to local service veterans. Its collection was helped by donations through the Friends of the Library organization. Staffing was increased so that the branch would be open 48 hours a week, compared with just 27 hours at the Serrano branch.

In 2003 Lenore Coale, president of the Friends of the Serrano Library, noted that many patrons received government assistance and relied heavily on the library, which had just suffered a countywide cutback in funding. She said volunteers were using opened books or stuffed animals to fill the gaps in the shelves.

However, in recent years the County Library's budget for purchasing has increased and the library continues to thrive. More information about the library and the services it offers can be found here.

== Communication ==
The ZIP Code is 92371 and 92329 and the community is inside area codes 442 and 760.
