= Chris Smith (pitcher, born 1981) =

American baseball player

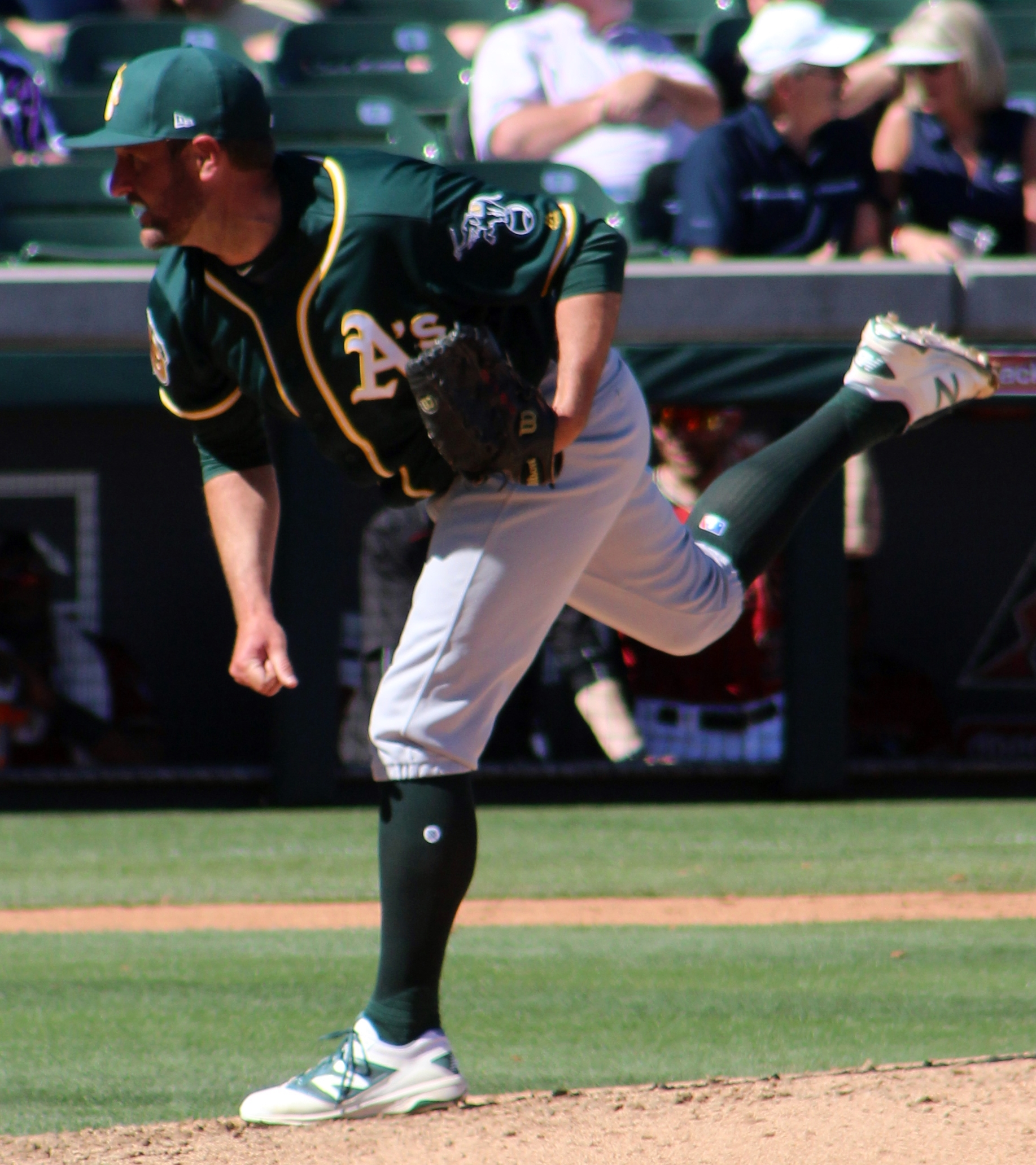
- Smith with the Oakland A's in 2017
- Pitcher
- Born: April 9, 1981 (age 45); Apple Valley, California, U.S.
- Batted: Right Threw: Right

MLB debut
- June 21, 2008, for the Boston Red Sox

Last MLB appearance
- September 30, 2017, for the Oakland Athletics

MLB statistics
- Win–loss record: 1–4
- Earned run average: 5.41
- Strikeouts: 112
- Stats at Baseball Reference

Teams
- Boston Red Sox (2008); Milwaukee Brewers (2009–2010); Oakland Athletics (2016–2017)

Christopher Michael Smith (born April 9, 1981) is an American former professional baseball pitcher and current pitching coach in the Oakland Athletics organization. He previously played in Major League Baseball (MLB) for the Boston Red Sox, Milwaukee Brewers, and Oakland Athletics. He is a 1999 graduate of Hesperia High School in Hesperia, California, and attended the University of California, Riverside.

== College ==
While attending the University of California, Riverside, Smith posted a 9–8 record and a 2.91 ERA. He also broke a school record with 127 strikeouts and had a team-high eight complete games. He earned Big West Pitcher of the Week honors after a 15-strikeout performance at University of California, Irvine, and was named second team All-Big West.

== Professional career ==
Smith was selected by Boston Red Sox in 4th round of the 2002 Major League Baseball draft and began his professional career playing for the Lowell Spinners of the New York–Penn League. However, Smith missed most of the 2002 season after being injured in an ATV accident.

=== Boston Red Sox ===
By 2006, Smith had worked his way up to the Triple-A Pawtucket Red Sox and split the 2006 and 2007 seasons between Pawtucket and the Double-A Portland Sea Dogs. He began the 2008 season with Pawtucket. On May 17, 2008, the Red Sox called up Smith from Pawtucket to help out their bullpen. However, he was sent back to Pawtucket on May 20 without appearing in a game. On June 21, Smith made his debut against the St. Louis Cardinals at Fenway Park in the second inning with the bases loaded in relief of Daisuke Matsuzaka. Smith recorded his first major league out by striking out Rick Ankiel on three straight changeups. He then gave up a grand slam to Troy Glaus for his first earned run. During his debut, he ended up going four innings, allowing just the one run, three hits, striking out three and not walking anyone.

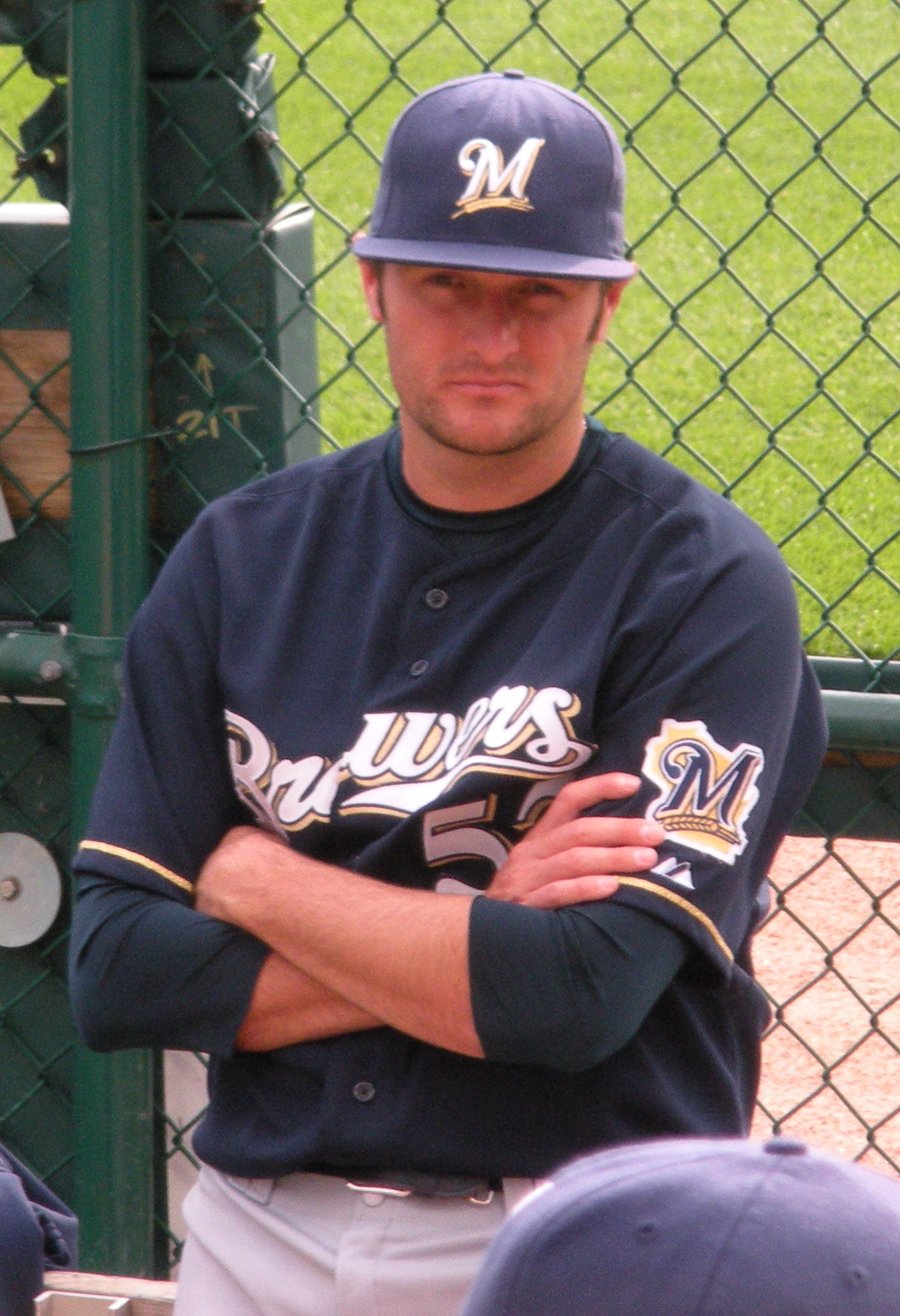
Smith with the Milwaukee Brewers in 2009

Smith earned his first major league win on June 24, 2008, pitching two scoreless innings against the Arizona Diamondbacks in relief of starter Justin Masterson. He was designated for assignment on October 17, and elected to become a free agent after clearing waivers.

=== Milwaukee Brewers ===
He later signed a minor league contract with the Milwaukee Brewers with an invitation to spring training. He was assigned to the Triple-A Nashville Sounds to start the 2009 season; he was called up to Milwaukee on June 4 and optioned to Nashville on August 10. Smith was recalled on September 1 and finished the season with Milwaukee.

On January 27, 2010, Smith was designated for assignment by the Milwaukee Brewers to make room on the roster for Joe Inglett. He played the majority of the 2010 season with Nashville, but also played three games for Milwaukee. Smith led the Pacific Coast League with 26 saves. He elected to become a free agent at the end of the season.

=== Minor and Independent leagues ===
He signed with the Seattle Mariners on a minor league contract and ended up playing for the Tacoma Rainiers in 2011 before being released during the season. He later played with the Washington (Frontier) independent league for 2012 season and signed a minor league contract with New York Yankees for the 2013 season.

Smith signed with the Wichita Wingnuts of the American Association of Independent Professional Baseball on March 5, 2013. He played with the Sugar Land Skeeters of the Atlantic League of Professional Baseball in 2014.

=== San Diego Padres ===
On June 26 2014, Smith's contract was purchased by the San Diego Padres organization. He was subsequently assigned to the Triple-A El Paso Chihuahuas. In 14 games for El Paso, he compiled a 5.61 ERA with 46 strikeouts across 43 1/3 innings.

=== Return to the major leagues with Oakland Athletics ===
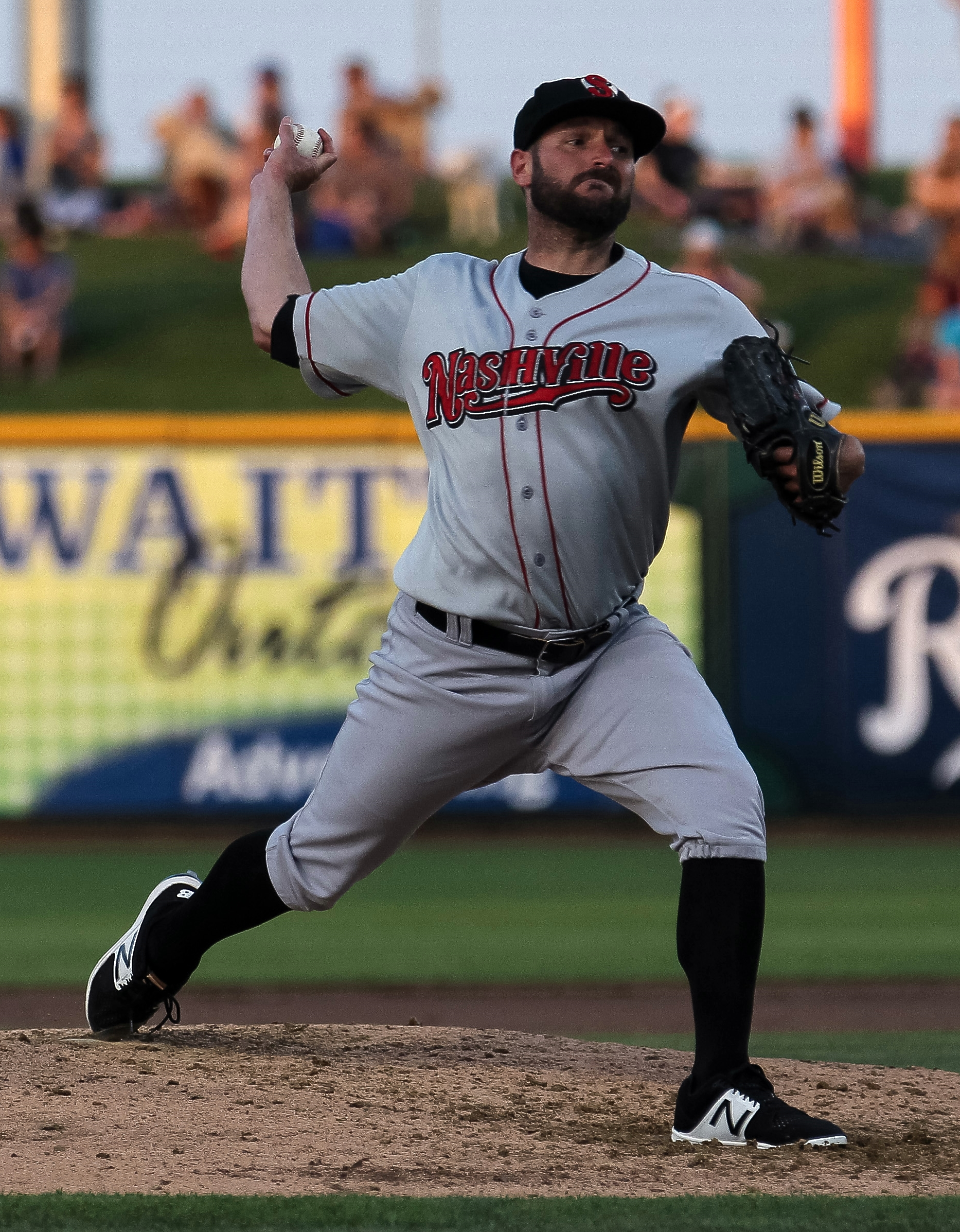
Smith threw six innings in a combined no-hitter for Nashville in 2017 (shown).

For the 2016 season, Smith signed a minor league contract with the Oakland Athletics and was assigned to Triple-A Nashville Sounds. On August 6, 2016, he was added to the 40-man roster and was brought up to the major league. He was added due to injuries suffered by A's ace Sonny Gray and catcher Josh Phegley. He made his first MLB appearance in nearly six years on August 7, 2016, pitching a scoreless ninth inning while striking out Dexter Fowler. He was sent outright to Triple-A after the 2016 season on October 5. On June 7, 2017, Smith pitched the first six innings of a combined no-hitter for the Sounds against the Omaha Storm Chasers. He was relieved by Sean Doolittle, Tucker Healy, and Simón Castro who pitched one inning each. Smith was called up again to the Athletics on July 8, 2017, to make a spot start against the Mariners. At age 36, Smith became the oldest player to make his first career start with the Athletics in 117 years. He was sent outright to Triple-A after the 2017 season and elected to become a free agent.

== Coaching career ==
Smith was hired as the pitching coach for the Oakland Athletics' High–A Stockton Ports for the 2019 season. He was promoted to pitching coach of the Midland Rockhounds the Double-A affiliate for the 2023 season.
