= La culpa (song) =

2021 single by Joel DELEŌN

"La Culpa"

Single by Joel DELEŌN
- Language: Spanish
- English title: "The Guilt"
- Released: October 21, 2021
- Genre: Ranchera; Regional Mexican; Latin Pop
- Length: 3:22
- Label: WK Entertainment
- Songwriters: Joel DELEŌN; Samantha Cámara
- Producer: Orlando Vitto

Joel DELEŌN singles chronology
"La Culpa" (2021)	"COCO" (2022)

Music video
- "La culpa" on YouTube

"La Culpa" is the debut solo single by Mexican-American singer Joel DELEŌN. It was released on October 21, 2021, by WK Entertainment following DELEŌN's exit from CNCO in May.

Produced by Orlando Vitto and accompanied on guitar by Joss Favela, the song is a fusion of pop and Mexican regional music. It was composed by DELEŌN and his friend Samantha Cámara (daughter of Víctor Cámara). Its lyrics tell about the guilt carried by the protagonist for betraying his girlfriend. The music video depicts Mexican heritage and cowboy-like scenes.

== Background ==
DELEŌN announced his exit from CNCO in April 2021, citing wishes to "grow and explore new artistic venues". The song was preceded by a last-name change of the artist in an homage to his maternal grandfather, who taught him how to sing and initiated his passion for music.
