= Blue (Joel Deleón song) =

2023 single by Joel DELEŌN

Single by Joel Deleón
- Language: Spanish
- Released: October 26, 2023
- Genre: Synth-pop
- Length: 2:59
- Label: House Meraki
- Songwriters: Joel Deleōn; Alejandro Fernández; Barbara Vázquez Murguia; Carlos Santander; Jorge Luis Perez; Joseph Barrios; Michelle Vázquez Murguia

Joel Deleón singles chronology
"IDK Y" (2022)	"Blue" (2023)

Music video
- "Blue" on YouTube

"Blue" is a song by Mexican-American singer Joel Deleón. This song came some time after being open about his struggles with his label and past management. As a much-announced comeback, this song was released on October 26, 2023.

Alejandro Fernández and other artists are credited for co-writing this song with Deleón. The artist sings in Spanish, with some English phrases; he shows his vocal range as he sings about a breakup that lingers on his mind.
