= IDK Y =

2022 single

Single by Joel DELEŌN
- Language: Spanish
- Released: December 16, 2022
- Length: 2:41
- Label: Sony Music Latin
- Songwriter(s): Joel Deleōn; Fray Gómez; Santiago Naranjo; Christian Palacio Arévalo; Juan José Arias Castaneda
- Producer(s): Juan José Arias Castaneda

Joel DELEŌN singles chronology
"COCO" (2022)	"IDK Y" (2022)	"Blue" (2023)

Music video
- "IDK Y" on YouTube

"IDK Y" is a song by Mexican-American singer Joel Deleōn. Recorded at La Fama Records, Medellín, it was released on December 16, 2022; days later he suggested the possibility of future collaborations with his former CNCO mates.

Its music video, in three colors, is characterized by its minimalism.
