= Marcel Reece =

American football player and executive (born 1985)

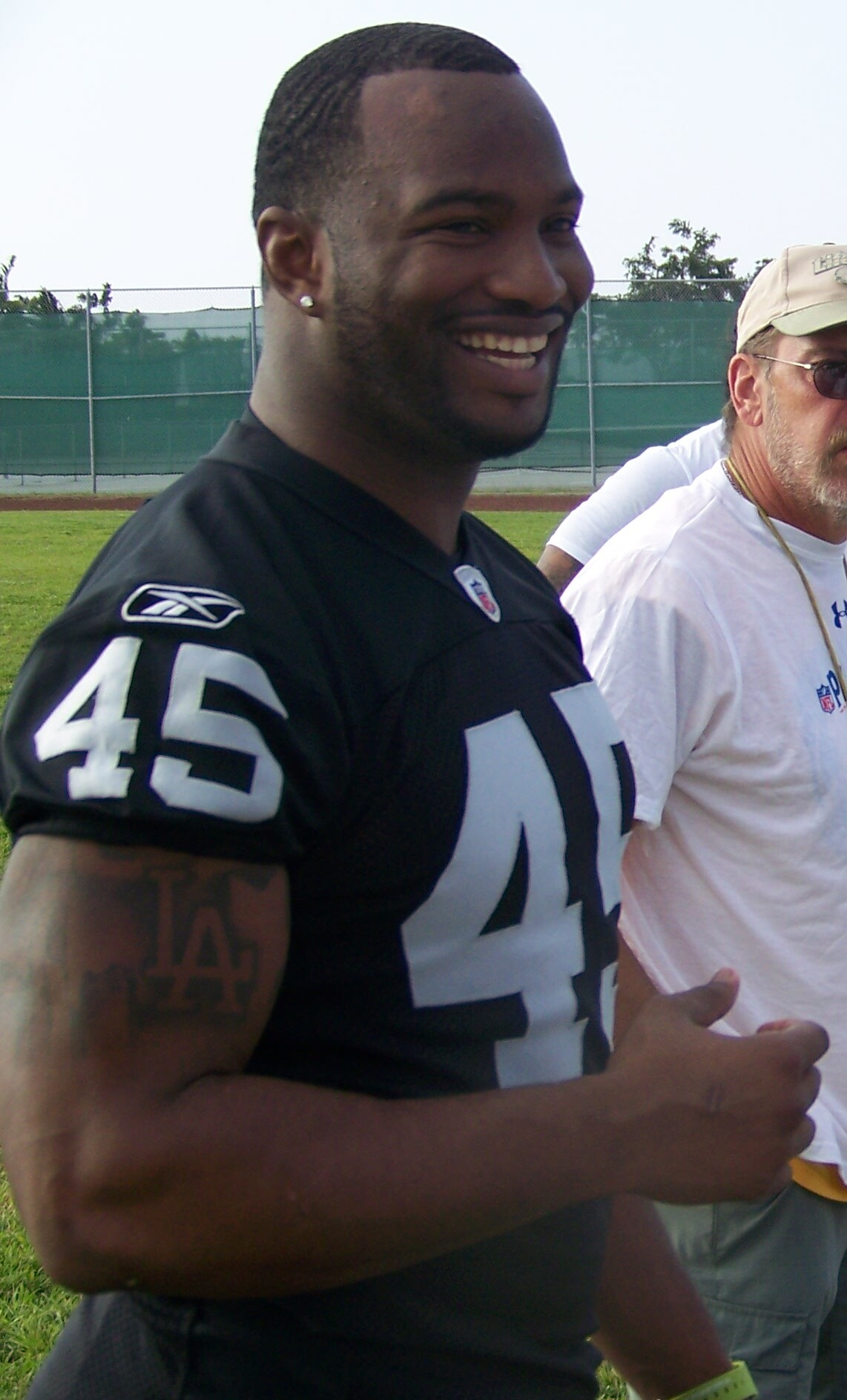
- Reece with the Raiders in 2011

No. 45, 44
- Position: Fullback

Personal information
- Born: June 23, 1985 (age 41); Inglewood, California, U.S.
- Listed height: 6 ft 1 in (1.85 m)
- Listed weight: 235 lb (107 kg)

Career information
- High school: Hesperia (Hesperia, California)
- College: Chaffey (2004); El Camino (2005); Washington (2006–2007)
- NFL draft: 2008: undrafted

Career history

Playing
- Miami Dolphins (2008)*; Oakland Raiders (2008–2016); Seattle Seahawks (2016)
- * Offseason or practice squad member only

Operations
- Las Vegas Raiders (2020–2021) Senior advisor to the owner/President; Las Vegas Raiders (2022) Senior vice president/Chief of staff

Awards and highlights
- Second-team All-Pro (2013); 4× Pro Bowl (2012–2015)

Career NFL statistics
- Rushing yards: 844
- Rushing average: 4.6
- Rushing touchdowns: 3
- Receptions: 210
- Receiving yards: 2,088
- Receiving touchdowns: 12
- Stats at Pro Football Reference

Marcel Antoine Wayne Reece (born June 23, 1985) is an American former professional football player who was a fullback in the National Football League (NFL). He played college football as a wide receiver for the Washington Huskies and was signed by the Miami Dolphins as an undrafted free agent after the 2008 NFL draft. He was also a member of the Oakland Raiders and the Seattle Seahawks. After his playing career, Reece became an executive with the Las Vegas Raiders in 2020. Reece is currently a studio sports analyst for the B1G Network.

== Early life ==
Reece attended Hesperia High School in Hesperia, California, where he was a first-team All-league performer in football, basketball and track. In football, he earned All-league honors as a wide receiver.

In track & field, Reece competed as a sprinter while at Hesperia, earning All-league honors. He recorded a personal-best time of 49.8 seconds in the 400-meter dash as a senior. In addition, he also recorded a 4.45-second 40-yard dash, bench-pressed 360 pounds and had a 34-inch vertical.

== College career ==
Reece continued his football career at Chaffey College where he posted 25 receptions for 600 yards and 7 touchdowns. Reece decided to transfer to El Camino College the following year where he posted 47 catches for 1,286 yards and 13 touchdowns. This performance earned him a scholarship to the University of Washington. He broke out during his senior year and made 39 catches for 761 yards and 8 touchdowns. The most notable play of Reece's career came against the University of Arizona where he had a 98-yard reception for a touchdown, which is the longest play from scrimmage in UW history. He also became a member of the Omega Psi Phi fraternity.

== Professional career ==
=== Pre-draft ===
Pre-draft measurables
Height	Weight	40-yard dash	10-yard split	20-yard split	20-yard shuttle	Three-cone drill	Vertical jump	Broad jump
6 ft 0 1/8 in (1.83 m)	231 lb (105 kg)	4.42 s	1.51 s	2.55 s	4.26 s	7.20 s	36.5 in (0.93 m)	9 ft 6 in (2.90 m)
All values from Pro Day

Despite posting a 4.4-second 40-yard dash, Reece was not drafted. He was noted as a "tweener", meaning that scouts did not know what position would fit him in the NFL. He was noted as being too big to be a receiver and too small to be a tight end.

=== Miami Dolphins ===
He was signed by the Miami Dolphins as an undrafted free agent in 2008. That same year, he was later cut after not making the final squad.

=== Oakland Raiders ===
The Raiders picked him up and experimented with him in a variety of positions and in this process found that fullback fit him best. Reece spent the entire 2008 season and the majority of the 2009 campaign on the Raiders’ practice squad.

In the 2010 NFL season, he emerged as the starting fullback for the Oakland Raiders, hauling in 25 receptions for 333 yards and 3 touchdowns while rushing for 122 yards and one touchdown. He blocked for his teammate running back Darren McFadden, who rushed for 1,157 yards and 7 touchdowns.

In 2012, after a series of injuries to McFadden and back-up Mike Goodson, Marcel Reece was switched from fullback to running back. He rushed for a total of 271 yards and recorded 52 receptions for 496 yards and one touchdown.

In 2013, both McFadden and back-up Rashad Jennings were limited due to injures, allowing Reece to line up at running back. On December 27, 2013, he was the lone Raider selected for the 2013 Pro Bowl, his second Pro Bowl nomination.

On December 23, 2014, Reece was selected once again to the Pro Bowl, marking his third straight Pro Bowl appearance at the fullback position.

In 2015, after Derek Carr suffered an injury to his throwing hand, Matt McGloin stepped in at quarterback, finding Reece for two receiving touchdowns, in a season-opening loss to the Cincinnati Bengals. On December 22, 2015, he was selected to his fourth straight Pro Bowl. On December 28, Reece was suspended for four games for violating league policy on performance-enhancing substances.

Reece was released by the Raiders on September 26, 2016.

=== Seattle Seahawks ===
On December 6, 2016, Reece was signed by the Seattle Seahawks.

On July 28, 2017, Reece was re-signed by the Seahawks. He was released by Seattle on September 2.

=== Career statistics ===
Season	Team	G	GS	Rushing					Receiving					Fumbles	
Season	Team	G	GS	Att	Yds	Avg	Long	TD	Rec	Yds	Avg	Long	TD	Fum	Lost
2008	OAK	0	0	–	–	–	–	–	–	--	–	–	–	–	–
2009	OAK	2	0	–	–	–	–	–	2	20	10.0	11	0	–	–
2010	OAK	16	10	30	122	4.1	31	1	25	333	13.3	73T	3	1	1
2011	OAK	12	6	17	112	6.6	26	0	27	301	11.1	47	2	1	1
2012	OAK	16	14	59	271	4.6	17	0	52	496	9.5	56	1	2	0
2013	OAK	16	15	46	218	4.7	63T	2	32	331	10.3	45	2	–	–
2014	OAK	15	15	21	85	4.0	11	0	37	265	7.2	19	1	1	1
2015	OAK	15	7	10	36	3.6	12	0	30	269	9.0	55	3	–	–
2016	SEA	4	0	2	0	0	0	0	5	73	14.6	31	0	–	–
Career		96	67	185	844	4.6	63	3	210	2,088	9.8	73	12	5	3

== Post-playing career ==
On September 11, 2020, the Las Vegas Raiders announced Reece's return to the organization in an executive position, with the newly created title of Senior Advisor to the Owner and President for Mark Davis and Marc Badain. Less than two years later, Reece was promoted to Chief People Officer and then around May 21, 2022, Reece became Raiders' Senior Vice President, Chief of Staff. He resigned in 2023.

Reece is currently a studio sports analyst for the B1G Ten Network.
