= Serrano High School =

Location
- 9292 Sheep Creek Road; Phelan, California 92371; United States; 34°24′46″N 117°34′22″W

Information
- Type: Public High School
- School district: Snowline Joint Unified School District
- NCES District ID: 0636970
- NCES School ID: 063697007876
- Principal: Lisa Hansen
- Teaching staff: 96.64 (FTE)
- Grades: 9-12
- Enrollment: 2,145 (2022–2023)
- Average class size: 31
- Student to teacher ratio: 22.20
- Colors: Blue and yellow
- Slogan: Home of the Diamondbacks
- Mascot: Diamondback
- Website: shs.snowlineschools.com

Serrano High School is a public high school in the California High Desert community of Phelan, California. It serves students from Phelan, Wrightwood and Piñon Hills. It is part of the Snowline Joint Unified School District. The school is named for the Serrano people. Its mascot is the Diamondback.

== Campus ==
Serrano High School is primarily made up of portable classrooms, many of which were installed in the early to mid 2000s.

Serrano High School was designed originally in the 1970s by CTE Architects of Ontario California. The design was strictly utilitarian. The top of Serrano High School's Performing Arts Center building rises 45 ft, it is the tallest structure in the Phelan area.

In 1998 Serrano High School constructed a new gymnasium, attached to the old one, also designed by the same firm which built the school.

Serrano High School is named after the indigenous Serrano People who first populated the region.

=== Deterioration ===
The school has not seen major renovations since its construction and is rapidly deteriorating. In early 2024, several panels collapsed off the side of the main Performing Arts Center of the school after a storm.

Some of the issues with Serrano High School are flaws of design. It is not ADA compliant, as its ramps exceed the allowed grade per the law.

In 2024 Serrano High School held a seminar to enumerate multiple structural issues with the school.

== Rankings ==
Serrano High School was nationally ranked #1,607 for best high schools for the 2009–2010 school year according to US News. With a student teacher ratio of 27:1, Serrano pulled a 21.5 on the college readiness index. Serrano was also ranked 38th within California.

== Notable alumni ==
- Guadalupe Hayes-Mota 2004 graduate, biotechnologist, professor Massachusetts Institute of Technology and Salutatorian class 2004.
- Jamaal Franklin 2009 graduate, a professional basketball player who plays for the Sichuan Blue Whales of the Chinese Basketball Association (CBA)
- Jilon VanOver 1996 graduate, actor, best known for playing the role of Ransom Bray on Hatfields & McCoys.
- Caleb Calvert Professional Soccer Player for the Colorado Rapids on loan to the USL team Charlotte Independence
- Aaron Long Professional soccer player who plays as a defender for New York Red Bulls.
