= Hesperia Unified School District =

School district in California

Address
- 15576 Main Street Hesperia, California, 92345; United States

District information
- Type: Public
- Motto: Preparing Today's Students for Tomorrow's World
- Grades: Transitional Kindergarten – Grade 12
- Superintendent: Dr. Michelle Smith
- NCES District ID: 0600014

Students and staff
- Students: 21,926 (2020–2021)
- Teachers: 929.33 (FTE)
- Staff: 1,154.25 (FTE)
- Student–teacher ratio: 23.59:1

Other information
- Website: www.hesperiausd.org

Hesperia Unified School District is a school district in San Bernardino County, California. Hesperia Unified School District serves the City of Hesperia and adjacent areas in the High Desert of San Bernardino County and covers 140 square miles. The Hesperia Unified School District provides public education services for kindergarten through senior high school students. It includes 3 comprehensive high schools, 2 continuation high schools, 3 middle schools, 12 elementary schools, 3 choice schools, 2 alternative schools, 1 adult education school, and 5 charter schools.

Hesperia Unified School District was formed in 1987. Until that time, students in the area were served by the Hesperia Elementary School District and the Victor Valley Union High School District.

== Boundary ==
It includes the majority of Hesperia, a section of Victorville, and a portion of the Oak Hills census-designated place. It also includes a very small portion of Crestline CDP.

== Schools ==
=== High schools ===
- Hesperia High School
- Oak Hills High School
- Sultana High School

=== Middle schools ===
- Cedar Middle School
- Hesperia Junior High School
- Ranchero Middle School

=== Elementary schools ===
- Carmel Elementary School
- Cottonwood Elementary School
- Eucalyptus Elementary School
- Hollyvale Elementary School
- Joshua Circle Elementary School
- Juniper Elementary School
- Kingston Elementary School
- Lime Street Elementary School
- Maple Elementary School
- Mesa Grande Elementary School
- Mesquite Trails Elementary School
- Mission Crest Elementary School

=== Choice schools ===
- Cypress School of the Arts (K-6)
- Krystal School of Science, Math, and Technology (K-6)
- Topaz Preparatory Academy (K-6)

=== Alternative/Continuation schools ===
- Hesperia Adult School
- Canyon Ridge High School
- Mojave High School
- Hesperia Community Day School
- Shadow Ridge School

=== Transitional Kindergarten available at the following locations ===
- Cottonwood Elementary
- Hollyvale Elementary
- Joshua Circle Elementary
- Juniper Elementary
- Krystal Elementary
- Lime Street Elementary
- Maple Elementary
- Mesa Grande Elementary
- Mission Crest Elementary

=== Charter schools ===
- LaVerne Elementary Preparatory Academy
- Mirus Secondary School
- Pathways to College (K-8)
- Summit Leadership Academy

== See also ==
- List of school districts in San Bernardino County, California
