= Hesperia Airport =

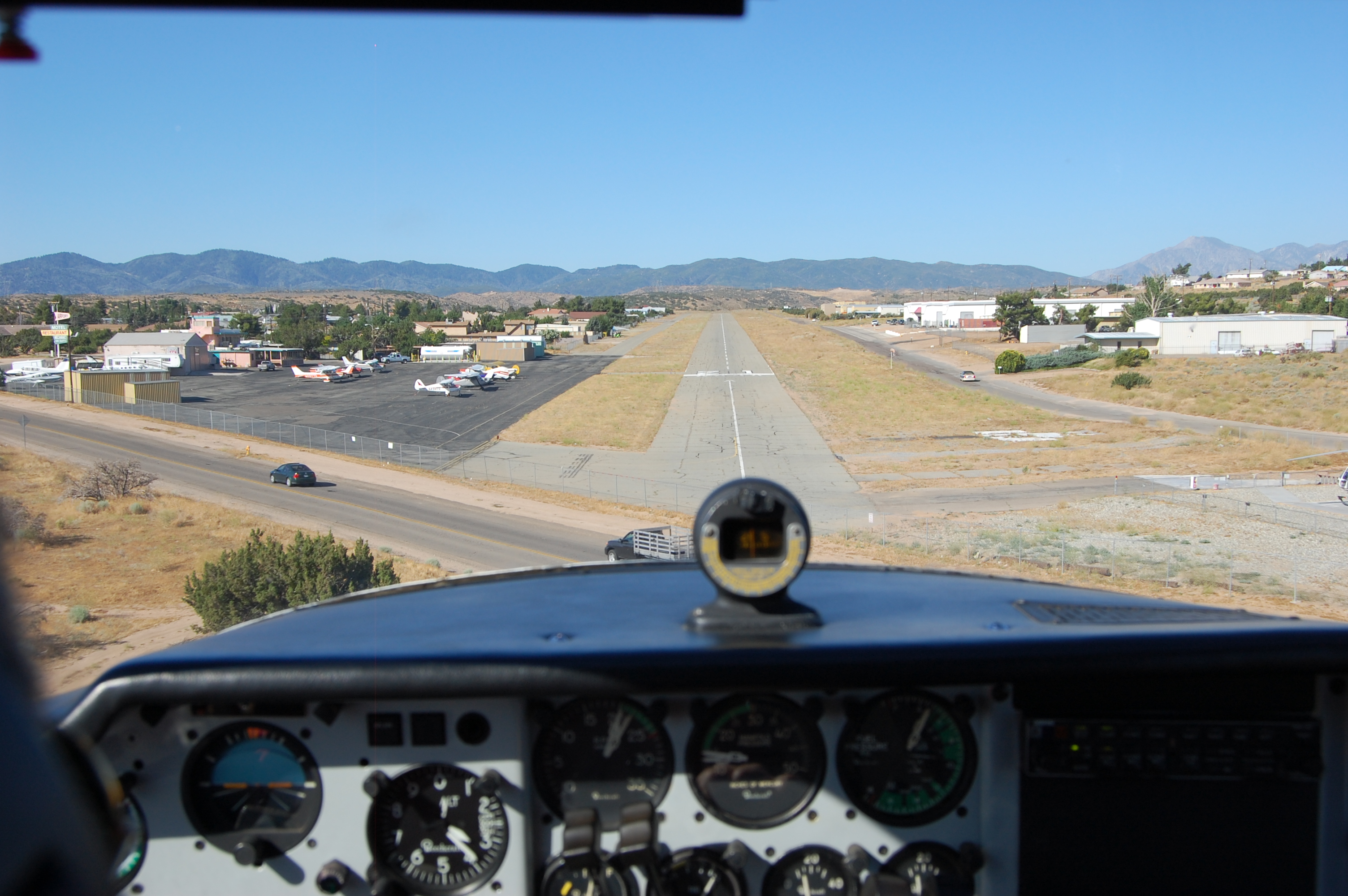
- The runway as seen on short final for runway 21

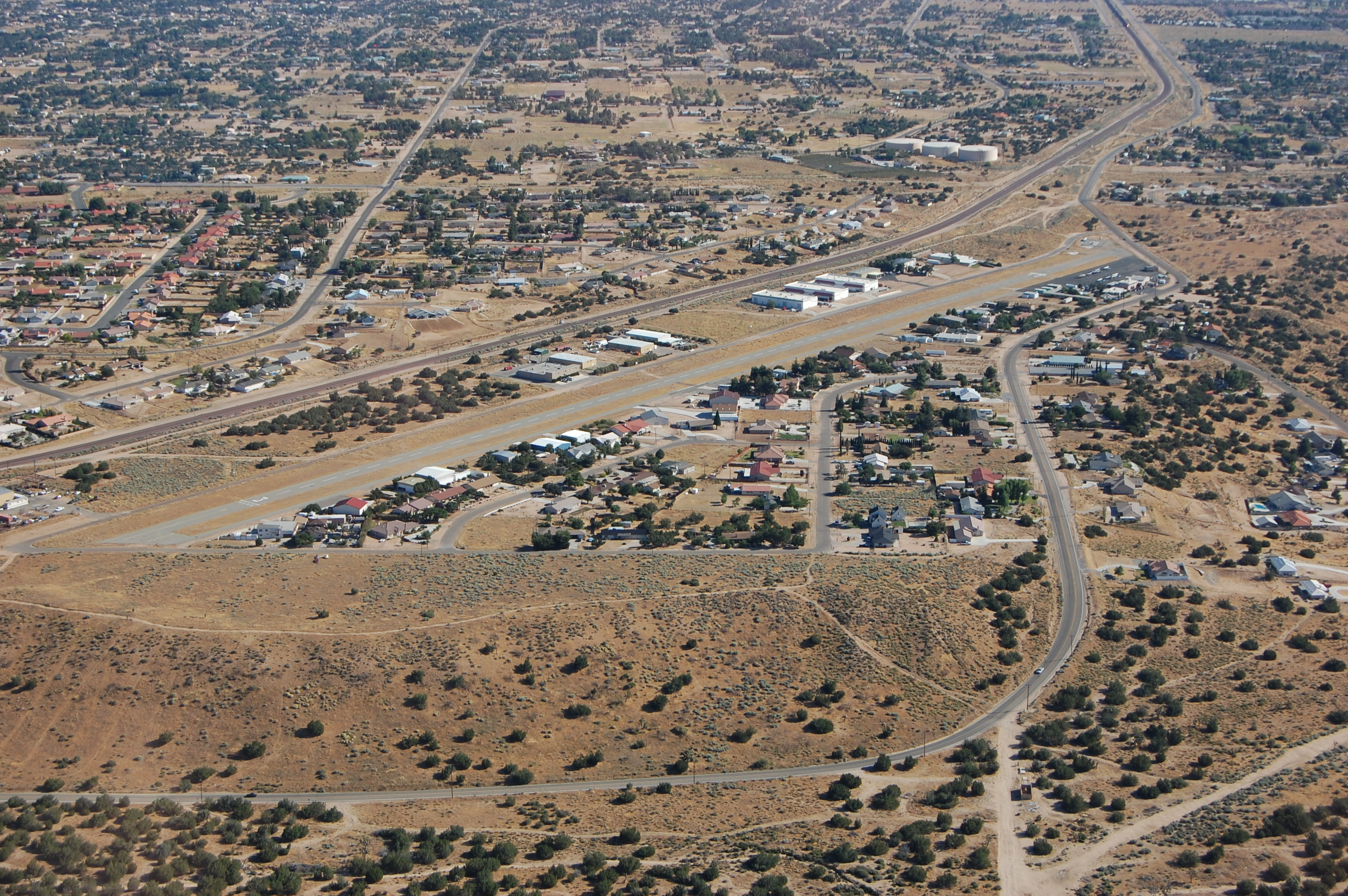
- The airport as seen from the air, turning downwind
- IATA: none; ICAO: none; FAA LID: L26

Summary
- Airport type: Public
- Operator: Silverwood Aviation Inc
- Serves: Hesperia, California
- Elevation AMSL: 3,390 ft (1,030 m)
- Interactive map of Hesperia Airport

Runways
Direction	Length		Surface
Direction	ft	m	Surface
3/21	3,910	1,192	Asphalt
- Source: Federal Aviation Administration

Hesperia Airport,(FAA LID: L26) is a public-use and privately owned airport located three nm south of the central business district of Hesperia, California, United States. Silverwood Aviation INC is the owner of the airport. The national plan of integrated airport system classified it as a general aviation, basic utility airport.

The nearest flight service station (FSS) is located at Riverside. As an FSS, the airport provides information and services to aircraft pilots before, during and after flights and provides assistance during emergencies.

The airport also has a 16-unit motel with swimming pool, restaurant, bar and additional land for extensions.

Mercy Air, a well known med-evac company, has a fixed base at the airport, including permanent medical and flight crews and their maintenance; they have serviced critical care transportation throughout California and Nevada for over 25 years.

== History ==
On August 16, 1960, Marion A. Alley, a Glendora investor, president and board chairman of the new Hesperia Bowl Corporation, and nine others bought the Hesperia Airport for $250,000 (equivalent to $2.03 million in 2024) from Harry Stanford of Hesperia. At the time, they planned to expand and modernize the airport; this included adding a 24-hour fly-in service. Included in the purchase were the bar, restaurant, motel and swimming pool. Named chief pilot instructor and airport manager was Charles Janisse. The new management's intentions were to attract weekend recreationalists, executives and golfers to the desert area.

== Accidents ==
On June 3, 1963, a World War II T-28 single engine trainer plane crashed in a shallow ravine, killing the two star performers at approximately 1:35pm during an airshow. The casualties were the airport manager and pilot, Leonard T. Lewis, 27, and the manager of the airport restaurant, Maitland John McNeill, 36.

A Cessna 337 Skymaster crashed, killing the crew of four men on October 31, 1979, minutes after takeoff en route to Torrance Municipal Airport. The wreckage was spotted at 8:30 pm, according to the San Bernardino County Department 3. Three of the victims were from the Rancho Palos Verdes area, and the fourth was from the Westminster area. The National Air Transportation and Safety Board conducted an investigation.

On March 7, 2017, a hobby ultralight aircraft crashed near Hesperia Airport at approximately 10 am. The pilot and only occupant was pronounced dead at the scene by the San Bernardino County Fire officials. The Federal Aviation Administration (FAA) did not investigate this crash, because the aircraft was not registered.

== Facilities and aircraft ==
Hesperia Airport covers an area of 26 acres (11 ha) at an elevation of 3,390 feet (1,030 m) above mean sea level. It has one runway: 3/21 is 3,910 by 50 feet (1,192 by 15 m) with an asphalt surface.

For the 12-month period ending December 31, 2018, the airport had an average of sixteen weekly general aviation operations. At that time there were 33 aircraft based at this airport: 29 single-engine, two multi-engine, one helicopter, and one ultralight.
