= Oak Hills, San Bernardino County, California =

Oak Hills, California
- census-designated place
- Location in San Bernardino County and the state of California

- Position in California. Oak Hills, California (the United States)
- Coordinates: 34°23′24″N 117°24′11″W
- Country: United States
- State: California
- County: San Bernardino

Area
  - Total: 24.516 sq mi (63.497 km^{2})
  - Land: 24.516 sq mi (63.497 km^{2})
  - Water: 0 sq mi (0 km^{2}) 0%
- Elevation: 3,799 ft (1,158 m)

Population (2020)
  - Total: 9,450
  - Density: 385/sq mi (149/km^{2})
- Time zone: UTC-8 (Pacific (PST))
  - Summer (DST): UTC-7 (PDT)
- GNIS feature ID: 2583100

Oak Hills is a census-designated place in the Victor Valley of the Mojave Desert, within San Bernardino County, California.

== Geography ==
Oak Hills is in the Mojave Desert north of the Cajon Summit of Cajon Pass, southwest of Hesperia, and east of Phelan.

Oak Hills sits at an elevation of 3,799 feet (1,158 m).

According to the United States Census Bureau, the CDP covers an area of 24.5 square miles (63.5 km^{2}), all of it land. The 2020 United States census reported Oak Hills's population was 9,450.

== Education ==
A portion of Oak Hills is in the Hesperia Unified School District, while another portion is in the Snowline Joint Unified School District.

Oak Hills High School, overseen by the Hesperia USD, is located in Oak Hills.

== Demographics ==
Historical population
Census	Pop.	Note	%±
2010	8,879		—
2020	9,450		6.4%
U.S. Decennial Census; 1850–1870 1880-1890; 1900 1910 1920; 1930 1940 1950; 1960 1970 1980; 1990 2000 2010

Oak Hills first appeared as a census designated place in the 2010 U.S. census.

The 2020 United States census reported that Oak Hills had a population of 9,450. The population density was 385.5 inhabitants per square mile (148.8/km^{2}). The racial makeup of Oak Hills was 55.0% White, 2.7% African American, 1.9% Native American, 2.8% Asian, 0.1% Pacific Islander, 21.6% from other races, and 15.9% from two or more races. Hispanic or Latino of any race were 41.2% of the population.

The census reported that 100.0% of the population lived in households, 3 people (0.0%) lived in non-institutionalized group quarters, and no one was institutionalized.

There were 2,941 households, out of which 34.7% included children under the age of 18, 65.2% were married-couple households, 4.8% were cohabiting couple households, 14.9% had a female householder with no partner present, and 15.1% had a male householder with no partner present. 13.4% of households were one person, and 5.8% were one person aged 65 or older. The average household size was 3.21. There were 2,412 families (82.0% of all households).

The age distribution was 23.3% under the age of 18, 8.6% aged 18 to 24, 22.0% aged 25 to 44, 31.0% aged 45 to 64, and 15.1% who were 65 years of age or older. The median age was 41.5 years. For every 100 females, there were 106.0 males.

There were 3,166 housing units at an average density of 129.1 units per square mile (49.8 units/km^{2}), of which 2,941 (92.9%) were occupied. Of these, 88.6% were owner-occupied, and 11.4% were occupied by renters.

In 2023, the US Census Bureau estimated that 13.7% of the population were foreign-born. Of all people aged 5 or older, 67.8% spoke only English at home, 25.1% spoke Spanish, 3.7% spoke other Indo-European languages, and 3.4% spoke Asian or Pacific Islander languages. Of those aged 25 or older, 88.5% were high school graduates and 18.1% had a bachelor's degree.

The median household income in 2023 was $98,424, and the per capita income was $51,168. About 5.7% of families and 8.3% of the population were below the poverty line.

== See also ==
- Populated places in the Mojave Desert
- Victor Valley topics
