= Sony Music Latin =

American record label

Sony Music US Latin LLC
- Logo used since 2023
- Parent company: Sony Music Entertainment (SME) (1980–2004, 2008–present); Previous: Sony BMG Music Entertainment (2004–2008)
- Founded: 1980; 46 years ago (as CBS Discos); 1991 (as Sony Discos); 2003 (as Sony Norte); 2004 (as Sony BMG Norte); 2009 (as Sony Music Latin)
- Distributors: Self-distributed; (in the US); Sony Music; (outside the US)
- Genre: Latin
- Country of origin: United States
- Location: Miami, Florida
- Official website: sonymusiclatin.com

Sony Music Entertainment US Latin LLC (often referred to as Sony Music Latin) is an American record label owned by Sony Music. The label focuses on artists of Latin music. Sony Latin was also a division of the Sony Discos label.

== History ==
The logo used until 2023

In 1979, CBS Records (now Columbia Records) ended its partnership with Caytronics after eleven years of distribution. CBS established its own division for Latin music in 1980 called CBS Discos (also known as Discos CBS). In 1988, CBS Records was acquired by Sony and its Latin division was renamed to Sony Discos in 1991. In 2003, Sony Discos was re-branded as Sony Norte following the departure of former Sony Discos president Oscar Llord. A year later, Bertelsmann Music Group (BMG) merged with Sony Music and Sony Norte was renamed to Sony BMG Norte. After BMG sold its assets in 2008, Sony BMG Norte was retitled to its current name Sony Music Latin in 2009. Alex Gallardo is the current President of Sony Music Latin.

== Labels distributed by Sony Music Latin ==
- Pina Records
- Premium Latin Music
- DEL Records
- Hand Shake Entertainment
- Top Stop Music
- Anval Music
- Bad Sin
- 5020 Records

== List of artists on Sony Music Latin ==
This is a list of artist currently signed to Sony Music Latin.

- Ana Gabriel
- Dysan & El Apocalypto
- Angelical
- Anna Carina
- Alex Luna
- Agung Bagus
- Amr Diab
- Anna Gabriel
- Anuel AA
- Arthur Hanlon
- Aventura
- Third Voices
- Becky G
- Beéle
- Bomba Estéreo
- C. Tangana
- Calle 13
- Camilo
- Carlos Jean
- Carlos Vives
- Cauty
- Charlie Zaa
- Chencho Corleone
- Chayanne
- ChocQuibTown
- Christina Aguilera
- CNCO
- Cristian Castro
- Happy Colors
- Darell
- Darumas
- Daddy Yankee
- Davido
- De La Tierra
- Draco Rosa
- Diana Fuentes
- Diego Boneta
- Diego Torres
- Dyland & Lenny
- Edgard Barrera
- Edgard Hernandez
- Ednita Nazario
- Enrique Iglesias
- Emilia
- Evaluna Montaner
- Farina
- F.A.N.S.
- Fuerza Regida
- Fortuna La Super F
- Fonseca
- Franco De Vita
- Farruko
- Gadiel
- Gale
- Gente de Zona
- Gerardo Ortiz
- Gilberto Santa Rosa
- Gloria Estefan
- Goyo
- Ha*Ash
- Héctor el Father
- Illya Kuryaki and the Valderramas
- Il Volo
- iLe
- Ir Sais
- Jenni Rivera
- Jennifer Lopez
- Jhosy
- Joel DELEŌN
- Joss Favela
- José Luis Rodríguez
- Julio Iglesias
- Kany García
- Kally's Mashup Cast
- Lali
- Lápiz Conciente
- Leslie Shaw
- Leslie Grace
- Lila Downs
- Limi-T 21
- Lo Blanquito
- Los Rivera Destino
- Luis Coronel
- Luis Figueroa
- Lupita Infante
- Maluma
- Manuel Turizo
- Mau y Ricky
- Marc Anthony
- Mariangela
- Michel Teló
- Miguel
- Natalia Jiménez
- Natalia Lafourcade
- Natti Natasha
- Neeus
- Nella Rojas
- Nicki Nicole
- Nicky Jam
- Noriel
- Nuevo Elemento
- Oliva
- Omar Montes
- OV7
- Ozuna
- Pabllo Vittar
- Paloma Mami
- Pedro Capó
- Pedro Suárez-Vértiz
- Pee Wee
- Play-N-Skillz
- Pizá
- Polimá Westcoast
- Poloo
- Prince Royce
- Ramon Vega
- Rauw Alejandro
- Raquel Sofía
- Reik
- Ricardo Montaner
- Ricky Martin
- Jean Rodríguez
- Río Roma
- Roberto Carlos
- Romeo Santos
- Rvssian
- Samo
- Sasha, Benny y Erik
- Silvestre Dangond
- Shakira
- Sky Rompiendo
- Sonus
- Thalía
- Tini
- Víctor Manuelle
- Víctor Gabriel
- Wisin
- Yendry
- Yeri Mua
- Yennis
- Yuki Chiba
- Yordano
- Yuri

== List of former artists on Sony Music Latin ==
These are artists who were formerly signed to Sony Music Latin.

- Aleks Syntek
- Alejandro Fernández
- Alexis & Fido
- Amaia Montero
- Banda Culiacancito
- Banda Machos
- Beatriz Luengo
- Camila (currently signed to Sony Music Mexico)
- Chambao
- Celia Cruz (Sony Discos)
- Charlie Masso
- Cumbre Norteña
- Da' Zoo
- Daddy Yankee
- Danny Rivera
- Eddie Santiago (Sony Discos)
- El Canto del Loc
- El Compa Chuy
- El Compa Sacra, El Ultimo Razo
- El Gran Combo de Puerto Rico
- Estopa
- Elvis Crespo
- Fito Páez
- Grupo Manía (Sony Discos)
- Grupo Escolta
- Gustavo Cerati
- Gusttavo Lima
- Ha*Ash
- Hombres G
- Huk
- Intocable
- Ivy Queen (Sony Discos)
- Jaci Velasquez (Sony Discos)
- Jay Perez (Sony Discos)
- Jerry Rivera
- Joel DELEŌN
- Jorge Celedón & Jimmy Zambrano (currently signed to Sony Music Colombia)
- José Feliciano
- Julieta Venegas
- Julio Reyes
- Julio Voltio
- Juan Gabriel
- Juan Magán
- Kalimba
- La 5ª Estación
- La Adictiva Banda San José de Mesillas
- La Mafia
- Leonel García
- Los Buitres de Cuilacan Sinaloa
- Los Cuates de Sinaloa
- La Oreja de Van Gogh
- Los Originales De San Juan
- Los Pikadientes De Caborca
- Los Reyes De Arranque
- Luis Enrique (Sony Discos)
- Lourdes Robles
- Lunna
- Martin Castillo
- Mennores
- NG2
- Noel Schajris
- Noel Torres
- NOTA
- Oscar D'León
- Pandora
- Pitbull
- Playa Limbo
- Raphael
- Revolver Cannabis
- Reyli
- Rey Ruiz (Sony Discos)
- Roberto Carlos
- Rocío Dúrcal
- Santiago Cruz
- Sophy
- Sheryl Rubio
- Son By Four
- Tempo
- UFF!
- Toby Love
- Vázquez Sounds
- Vicente Fernández
- Vicentico
- Yandel
- Yanni
- Yolandita Monge
- Yomo
- Yuridia

== See also ==
- List of Sony Music labels
