= Hesperia High School =

Location
- 9898 Maple Avenue; Hesperia, California 92345; United States
- Coordinates: 34°24′00″N 117°20′48″W

Information
- School type: Public high school
- Established: 1984
- School district: Hesperia Unified School District
- Superintendent: David Olney
- Principal: Everett
- Teaching staff: 102.07 (FTE)
- Grades: 9-12
- Enrollment: 2,325 (2023–2024)
- Student to teacher ratio: 22.78
- Campus: Suburban
- Campus size: 60 acres (24 ha)
- Colors: Vegas Gold; Black
- Mascot: Scorpion
- Rivals: Sultana Sultans
- Newspaper: The Sting
- Video: Hesperia Broadcasting
- Website: Official Site

Hesperia High School is a public four-year high school within the Hesperia Unified School District located in Hesperia, San Bernardino County, California. It is one of seven comprehensive high schools in the district.

The school currently is enrolled with less than 2,000 students in grades 9–12. Twice has the school's student body swelled to 4,000, forcing the HUSD to open Sultana High School, in 1995 and Oak Hills High School, in 2009. The school's official mascot is the scorpion and the colors are "Vegas gold" and black. Hesperia High School was the first high school to open in Hesperia, California in fall 1984, making it the oldest high school in the Hesperia Unified School District.

The high school is currently making a transition to an academy-like structure. This academy will allow students to earn college credit; however, instead of going to a separate campus students will be able to attend during school hours. This provides the advantage for the students, because they will simultaneously earn college credit and their A through G requirements in order to graduate from high school. This is the first campus to offer this type of opportunity in the high desert.

Hesperia High School was featured in a documentary called Shakespeare High about its drama department's success in the Shakespearean Festival in Southern California.

== Demographics ==
Data from 2020-2021, 2019-2020, 2018–2019 academic school years.

90.1% of the students are minorities.

9.9% White

78.8% Hispanic

8.5% Black

1.4% Asian

0.8% Two or More Races

0.3% Native Hawaiian/Pacific Islander

0.2% American Indian/Alaska Native

== Graduation requirements ==
All students who attend Hesperia High School must meet the following criteria to graduate.

- 4 years of English (40 credits)
- 3 years of Social Studies (30 credits)
- 2 years of Mathematics (20 credits)
- 3 years of Science (30 credits)
- 2 years of Physical Education (20 credits)
- 1 year of either a Performing Art or a Foreign Language (10 credits)
- 70 credits worth of electives
- Pass the CAHSEE

Overall, a student must have 220 credits accumulated from these subjects to graduate. As of the 2011-2012 school year, Hesperia High School has a graduation rate of 89.6%. (May be old so ask your counselor to make sure this is correct).

== Athletics ==
Hesperia High School offers a wide variety of sports to its students. Among them are:

- Baseball
- Girls Basketball
- Boys Basketball
- Cheer
- Cross Country
- Football
- Golf
- Girls Soccer
- Boys Soccer
- Softball
- Tennis
- Track
- Volleyball
- Wrestling

The school owns 8 tennis courts, 3 soccer fields, 2 softball fields, 2 baseball fields, and a football stadium recently constructed in 2006.

== Hesperia Broadcasting ==
Hesperia Broadcasting is the production company of the Broadcast Journalism class offered at Hesperia High School. Starting from the school year 2013-2014, Hesperia Broadcasting was the first in the High Desert to have their newscast, “Scorpion News”, deliver their news with a live anchor in high definition. The first live episode was aired October 31, 2013. Not only does Hesperia Broadcasting air Scorpion News to the high school, they also film other events such as the annual sophomore Poetry Slam and Mr. Scorpion competition.

=== Scorpion News ===
Scorpion News is a student-run newscast that films and edits video to give video announcements to the students and staff and highlight Hesperia High School. Scorpion News is part of Hesperia Broadcasting productions and was created in the 2010-2011 school year by the Broadcast Journalism teacher, Mr. Smith. Four years after its first season, it began airing news live.

== Notable alumni ==
- Joel Pimentel - Former member of CNCO
- New Boyz - Earl "Ben J" Benjamin and Dominic "Legacy" Thomas (rap group)
- Marcel Reece - NFL player
- Chris Smith - MLB pitcher
- Melina Perez - wrestler
- Dominick Reyes - UFC fighter

== Career College Resource Center ==
Hesperia High School offers a Career, College, and Resource Center in order to assist students with finding the appropriate career, finding the appropriate college, and receiving help with signing up for financial aid.
