= Hesperia, California =

City in California, United States

- City
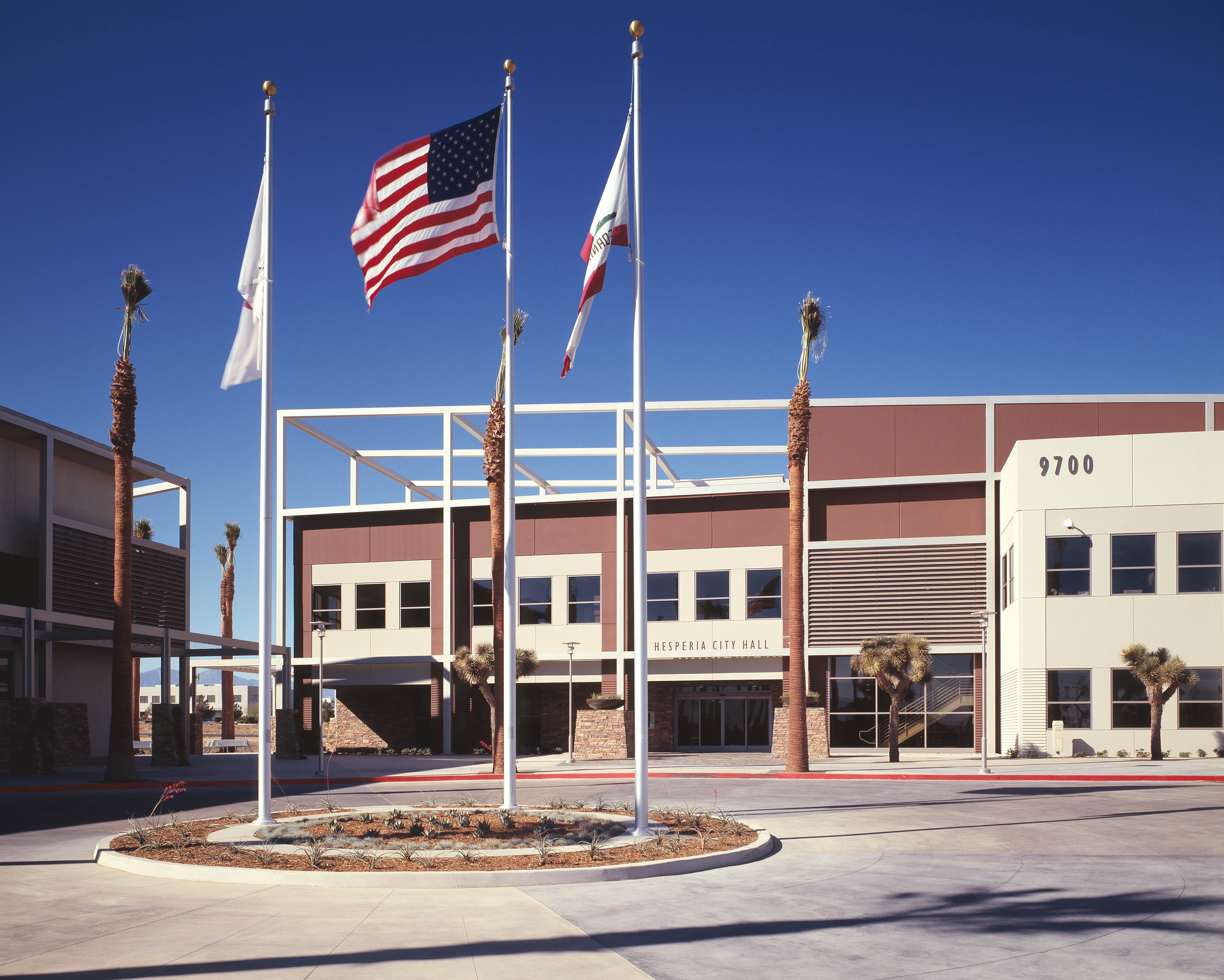
- Hesperia City Hall

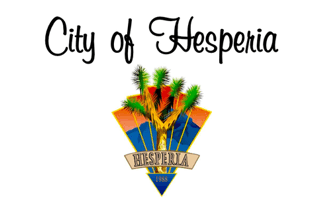
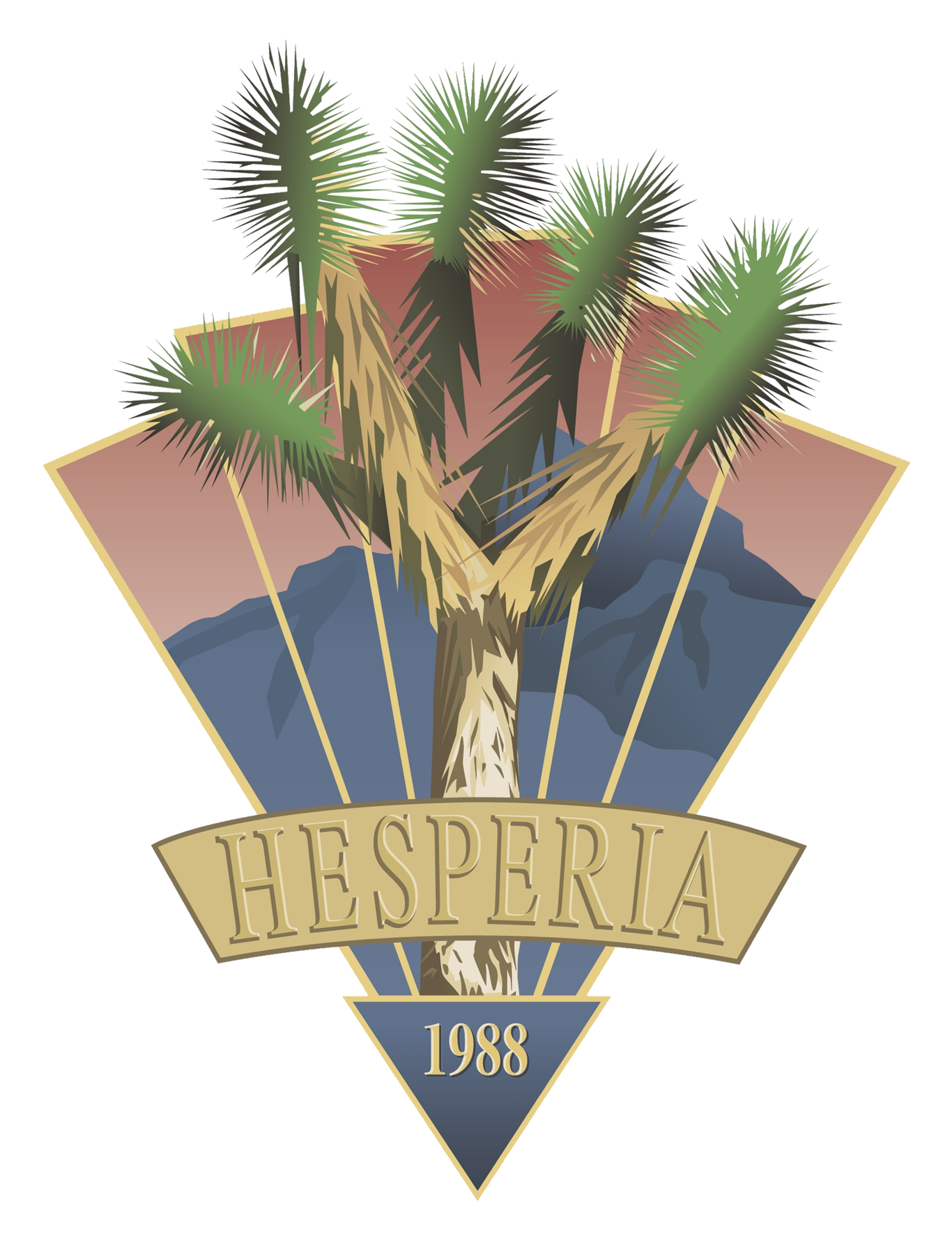
- Flag Seal
- Interactive map of Hesperia, California
- Location of Hesperia in the United States
- Coordinates: 34°22′20″N 117°19′52″W
- Country: United States
- State: California
- County: San Bernardino
- Incorporated: July 1, 1988

Government
  - Type: General Law City; Council–manager
  - City council: Allison Lee (Mayor); Cameron Gregg (Pro tempore); Chris Ochoa; Brigit Bennington; Josh Pullen
  - City manager: Rachel Molina
  - City treasurer: Vacant

Area
  - Total: 72.78 sq mi (188.49 km^{2})
  - Land: 72.68 sq mi (188.24 km^{2})
  - Water: 0.097 sq mi (0.25 km^{2}) 0.13%
- Elevation: 3,347 ft (1,020 m)

Population (2020)
  - Total: 99,818
  - Rank: 77th in California
  - Density: 1,373/sq mi (530.3/km^{2})
- Time zone: UTC−8 (PST)
  - Summer (DST): UTC−7 (PDT)
- ZIP Codes: 92340, 92344, 92345
- Area codes: 442/760
- FIPS code: 06-33434
- GNIS feature ID: 2410751
- Website: www.hesperiaca.gov

Hesperia (/hɛˈspɪəriə/) is a city in San Bernardino County, California, United States. It is located 35 miles (56 km) north of downtown San Bernardino in Victor Valley and surrounded by the Mojave Desert. Because of its relatively high elevation and the unique and moderate weather patterns of the region, Hesperia is part of what is locally called the High Desert. The name "Hesperia" means "western land". At the 2020 census, the city had a population of 99,818.

== History ==
The first inhabitants of the area were the Serrano people (Yuhaaviatam), and possibly their Desert Serrano Vanyume subgroup. The village of Wá’peat, among several other villages that were located along the Mojave River, were within the vicinity of what is now Hesperia. These villages were occupied into the early 1800s and had deep ties with one another. An acorn-gathering festival was held at Wá’peat that involved villagers from across the Mojave River area.

Hesperia began as a Spanish land grant: Rancho San Felipe, Las Flores, y el Paso del Cajon, founded in 1781. The land was sparsely inhabited desert during Spanish-Mexican rule in the 19th century. The U.S. annexed the region along with Southern California after the Mexican-American War in 1848.

In 1869, Max Stobel purchased 35,000 acres (14,000 ha) from the United States Government Land Office for $40,000. While several attempts were made to subdivide and encourage colonization, the land was primarily used for agricultural purposes, with raisin grapes the primary product.

The town site was laid out in 1891 by railroad company land developers of the Santa Fe Railroad, which was completed that year. Hesperia was named for Hesperus, the Greek god of the West. The railroad land developers published pamphlets distributed across the country with boosterism of Hesperia, California, as a potential metropolis, to become "the Omaha of the West" or projections to have over 100,000 people by 1900, but only 1,000 moved in.

Hesperia grew relatively slowly until the completion of US Routes 66, 91, and 395 in the 1940s, followed by Interstate 15 in the late 1960s. About 30 square miles (78 km^{2}) of land were laid out for possible residential development.

In the early 1950s, land developer M. Penn Phillips and his silent financial partner, boxer Jack Dempsey, financed the building of roads and land subdivisions, promoting lots sales on television. They built the Hesperia Inn and golf course, which attracted a variety of Hollywood celebrities. The Hesperia Inn also housed the Jack Dempsey Museum.

The main wave of newcomers, though, arrived at Hesperia in the 1980s. Suburban growth transformed the small town of 5,000 people in 1970 to a moderate-sized city with a population over 60,000 by 2000, and a population of 100,000 by 2020.

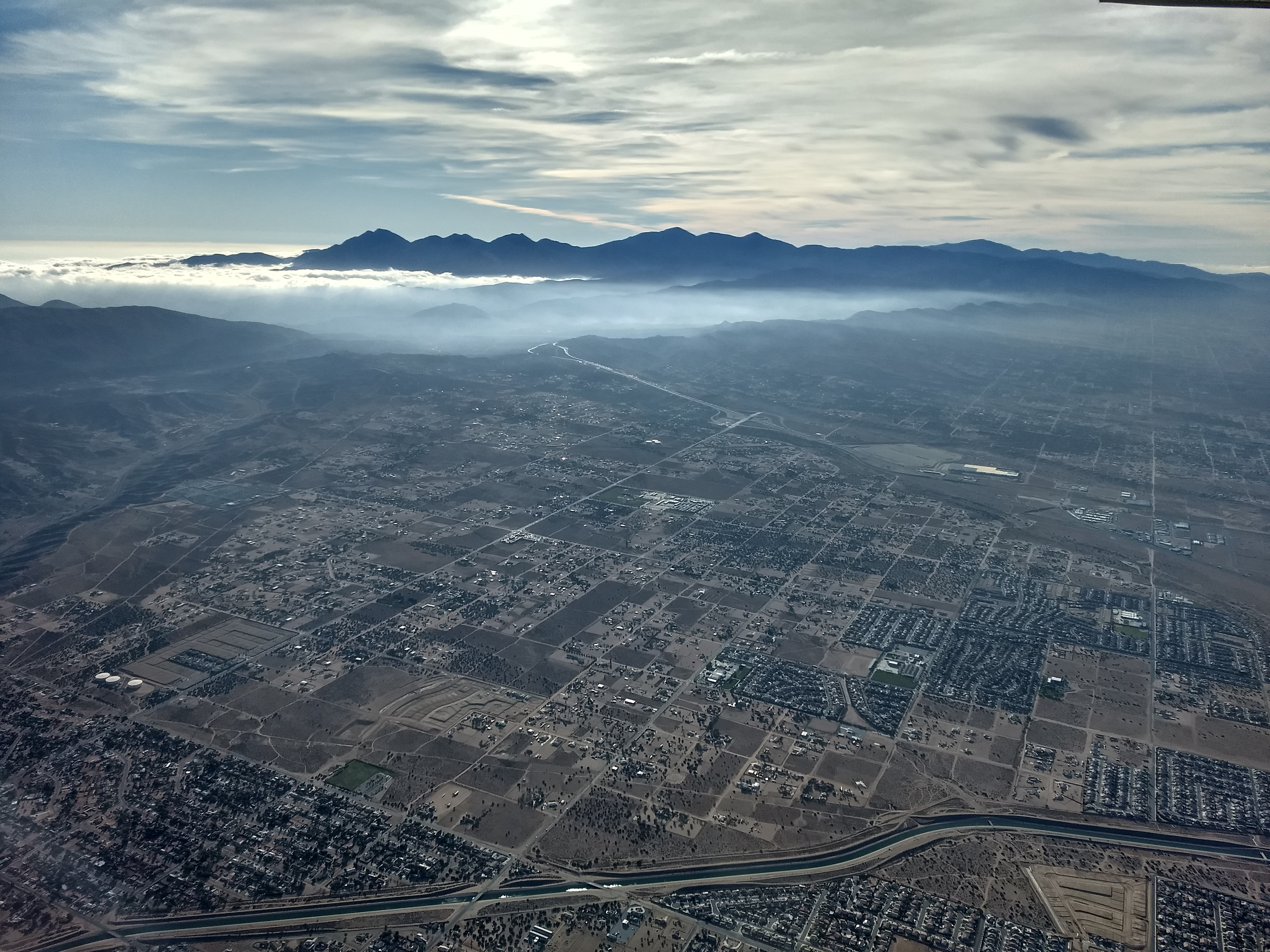
Hesperia from the air, looking southwest, towards the San Gabriel Mountains

== Geography ==
Hesperia is a city in the Mojave Desert, and the California Aqueduct traverses the area. Much of the native flora of Hesperia is classified as California desert vegetation, dominated by junipers, joshua trees, and sagebrush. The elevation rises from 3,200 feet (980 m) in the north to about 4,000 feet (1,200 m) above sea level to the south.

The San Andreas Fault, a major tectonic plate boundary of the Pacific and North American plates a few miles south of Hesperia in the Cajon Pass, has occasional seismic activity.

Hesperia is located at 3,186 feet (971 m) above sea level and is a neighbor of Victorville, Oak Hills, and Apple Valley. The Mojave River flows northerly through the east side of the city, while the California Aqueduct splits the city from north to south en route to Silverwood Lake.

According to the United States Census Bureau, the city has a total area of 72.8 square miles (189 km^{2}), with 72.7 square miles (188 km^{2}) of land and 0.1 square miles (0.26 km^{2}), or 0.13%, covered by water.

On the southern edge of Hesperia, where the city meets the desert by the airport to the east, is a somewhat pronounced mesa.

=== Climate ===
According to the Köppen climate classification, Hesperia has a cold desert climate, BWk on climate maps.

Winter days are cool with high temperatures averaging around 60 °F (15.6 °C), but temperatures get cold overnight, as the average low temperatures for December and January are around freezing. It is also the area's wet season. The rain shadow caused by the mountain ranges to the south and west shields Hesperia from the majority of winter rainfall, but heavy rain is not uncommon. The city officially receives a yearly average of 6.19 inches (157.2 mm) of precipitation. Winter snowfall is sporadic - the average yearly snowfall amount is 4.4 inches (111.8 mm).

Summer days are very hot, with high temperatures typically nearing 100 °F (37.8 °C). This excessive heat is typical of the Mojave Desert as a whole. The large diurnal temperature variation, though, provides substantial relief overnight. In the later part of the season, sporadic summer thunderstorms associated with the North American monsoon can bring power outages and local flash floods.

Climate data for Hesperia, California
Month	Jan	Feb	Mar	Apr	May	Jun	Jul	Aug	Sep	Oct	Nov	Dec	Year
Record high °F (°C)	80 (27)	87 (31)	93 (34)	100 (38)	108 (42)	111 (44)	116 (47)	112 (44)	113 (45)	101 (38)	88 (31)	85 (29)	116 (47)
Mean daily maximum °F (°C)	60 (16)	63 (17)	69 (21)	75 (24)	85 (29)	94 (34)	99 (37)	99 (37)	93 (34)	81 (27)	69 (21)	60 (16)	79 (26)
Mean daily minimum °F (°C)	32 (0)	35 (2)	39 (4)	44 (7)	50 (10)	56 (13)	62 (17)	62 (17)	56 (13)	46 (8)	37 (3)	31 (−1)	46 (8)
Record low °F (°C)	−1 (−18)	11 (−12)	14 (−10)	25 (−4)	30 (−1)	36 (2)	35 (2)	42 (6)	32 (0)	21 (−6)	8 (−13)	6 (−14)	−1 (−18)
Average precipitation inches (mm)	1.09 (28)	1.26 (32)	0.88 (22)	0.35 (8.9)	0.14 (3.6)	0.05 (1.3)	0.19 (4.8)	0.20 (5.1)	0.18 (4.6)	0.36 (9.1)	0.47 (12)	1.02 (26)	6.19 (157)
Source: The Weather Channel

== Demographics ==
Historical population
Census	Pop.	Note	%±
1970	4,592		—
1980	13,540		194.9%
1990	50,418		272.4%
2000	62,582		24.1%
2010	90,173		44.1%
2020	99,818		10.7%
2025 (est.)	102,605	▲	2.8%
U.S. Decennial Census

=== Racial and ethnic composition ===
Hesperia, California – Racial and ethnic composition Note: the US Census treats Hispanic/Latino as an ethnic category. This table excludes Latinos from the racial categories and assigns them to a separate category. Hispanics/Latinos may be of any race.
Race / Ethnicity (NH = Non-Hispanic)	Pop 2000	Pop 2010	Pop 2020	% 2000	% 2010	% 2020
White alone (NH)	39,057	37,027	29,444	62.41%	41.06%	29.50%
Black or African American alone (NH)	2,388	4,853	5,255	3.82%	5.38%	5.26%
Native American or Alaska Native alone (NH)	469	412	427	0.75%	0.46%	0.43%
Asian alone (NH)	619	1,704	2,193	0.99%	1.89%	2.20%
Native Hawaiian or Pacific Islander alone (NH)	102	205	205	0.16%	0.23%	0.21%
Other race alone (NH)	91	164	565	0.15%	0.18%	0.57%
Mixed race or Multiracial (NH)	1,456	1,717	3,081	2.33%	1.90%	3.09%
Hispanic or Latino (any race)	18,400	44,091	58,648	29.40%	48.90%	58.75%
Total	62,582	90,173	99,818	100.00%	100.00%	100.00%

=== 2020 census ===
As of the 2020 census, Hesperia had a population of 99,818 and a population density of 1,373.4 inhabitants per square mile (530.3/km^{2}). The racial makeup of Hesperia was 40.3% White, 5.6% African American, 1.9% Native American, 2.4% Asian, 0.2% Pacific Islander, 33.9% from other races, and 15.6% from two or more races. Hispanic or Latino people of any race were 58.8% of the population.

The age distribution was 28.7% under the age of 18, 10.0% aged 18 to 24, 26.4% aged 25 to 44, 22.7% aged 45 to 64, and 12.2% who were 65 years of age or older. The median age was 33.2 years. For every 100 females, there were 98.0 males, and for every 100 females age 18 and over, there were 95.9 males age 18 and over.

The census reported that 99.9% of the population lived in households, 0.1% lived in non-institutionalized group quarters, and 0.0% were institutionalized. Additionally, 98.3% of residents lived in urban areas, while 1.7% lived in rural areas.

There were 29,144 households, out of which 45.1% included children under the age of 18, 52.2% were married-couple households, 7.8% were cohabiting couple households, 23.4% had a female householder with no spouse or partner present, and 16.7% had a male householder with no spouse or partner present. About 16.0% of households were one person households, and 7.4% had someone living alone who was 65 years of age or older. The average household size was 3.42. There were 23,023 families (79.0% of all households).

There were 30,344 housing units at an average density of 417.5 units per square mile (161.2 units/km^{2}), of which 29,144 (96.0%) were occupied. Of the occupied units, 65.4% were owner-occupied and 34.6% were occupied by renters. About 4.0% of housing units were vacant, with a homeowner vacancy rate of 1.1% and a rental vacancy rate of 4.6%.

=== 2023 ACS 5-year estimates ===
In 2023, the US Census Bureau estimated that the median household income was $68,971, and the per capita income was $25,683. About 14.3% of families and 17.5% of the population were below the poverty line.

=== 2010 census ===
At the 2010 census, Hesperia had a population of 90,173. The population density was 1,231.7 inhabitants per square mile (475.6/km^{2}). The racial makeup of Hesperia was 55,129 (61.1%) White (41.1% non-Hispanic White), 5,226 (5.8%) African American, 1,118 (1.2%) Native American, 1,884 (2.1%) Asian, 270 (0.3%) Pacific Islander, 22,115 (24.5%) from other races, and 4,431 (4.9%) from two or more races. Hispanic or Latino of any race were 44,091 persons (48.9%).

The census reported that 90,145 people lived in households, 22 lived in noninstitutionalized group quarters, and six were institutionalized.

Of the 26,431 households, 49.8% had children under the age of 18 living in them, 56.0% were opposite-sex married couples living together, 16.0% had a female householder with no husband present, 8.1% had a male householder with no wife present; 7.6% were unmarried opposite-sex partnerships, and 0.7% were same-sex married couples or partnerships. About 15.3% were one-person households and 6.3% had someone living alone who was 65 or older. The average household size was 3.41. The average family size was 3.76.

The age distribution was 29,156 people (32.3%) under 18, 9,465 people (10.5%) from 18 to 24, 23,243 people (25.8%) from 25 to 44, 20,157 people (22.4%) from 45 to 64, and 8,152 people (9.0%) 65 or older. The median age was 30.5 years. For every 100 females, there were 98.5 males. For every 100 females age 18 and over, there were 95.0 males.

The 29,004 housing units averaged 396.2 per square mile; of the occupied units, 17,688 (66.9%) were owner-occupied and 8,743 (33.1%) were rented. The homeowner vacancy rate was 3.6%; the rental vacancy rate was 8.4%; 58,320 people (64.7% of the population) lived in owner-occupied housing units and 31,825 people (35.3%) lived in rental housing units.

According to the 2010 United States Census, Hesperia had a median household income of $46,027, with 23.1% of the population living below the federal poverty line.

== Economy ==
According to the city's 2020 Comprehensive Annual Financial Report, the principal employers in the city are:

#	Employer	# of Employees
1	Hesperia Unified School District	2,817
2	County of San Bernardino	648
3	Walmart Supercenter	405
4	Super Target	320
5	Stater Bros. Markets	320
6	City of Hesperia	261
7	Arizona Pipeline Company	213
8	In-N-Out Burger	143
9	Robar Ent/Hi Grade Material	129
10	Double Eagle Transportation	126
11	Hesperia Recreation & Park District	106

== Arts and culture ==
Hesperia has a manmade lake (Hesperia Lake Park) on the southeastern edge of the town. This lake is where various town activities are held, including the annual Hesperia Day activities. Camping and fishing are permitted here, as well as day camp and various junior leagues for sports.

Just south of Hesperia Lake Park is the Radio Control Model Aircraft Park, located at 1700 Arrowhead Lake Road. Home of the Victor Valley R/C Flyers, the R/C Park is open on a daily basis by its members.

Hesperia's golf course is known for its narrow fairways and fast greens. During the 1950s and 1960s, this course was a stop along the PGA Tour. The course runs from the rift between the "mesa" and the adjoining land on the other side.

To the east of Hesperia, the Mojave River runs from south to north, mainly under ground, and it surfaces in Victorville. Although the river bed is usually dry, it fills up if Hesperia experiences a rare heavy rain. Hesperia is bordered to the north by the city of Victorville, and to the east by the town of Apple Valley.

Hesperia is the home of Cal-Earth, a nonprofit organization demonstrating and teaching a method of home construction, particularly for arid hot areas, called Superadobe.

== Parks and recreation ==
Hesperia Recreation and Park District serves the recreational needs of the citizens. Established in 1957, Hesperia Recreation and Park District has facilities, both indoors and outdoors. The Southern California Hardball Association is a 28 and over, adult baseball league that serves Hesperia residents.

== Government ==
=== State and federal ===
In the California State Legislature, Hesperia is in the 23rd senatorial district, represented by Republican Suzette Martinez Valladares, and is split between the 34th Assembly district, represented by Republican Tom Lackey and the 39th Assembly district, represented by Democrat Juan Carrillo.

In the United States House of Representatives, Hesperia is in California's 23rd congressional district, represented by Republican Jay Obernolte.

=== Municipal ===
As of 2025, Allison Lee is the mayor of the city, with Cameron Gregg as the mayor pro tem. The other three council members are Chris Ochoa, Brigit Bennington, and Josh Pullen.

According to the city's 2010 Comprehensive Annual Financial Report, the city's various funds had $92.1 million in revenues, $98.7 million in expenditures, $520.5 million in total assets, $284.5 million in total liabilities, and $44.4 million in cash and investments.

Hesperia also has these advisory committees: City Council Advisory Committee, Planning Commission, and Public Safety Advisory Committee composed of citizens assigned to provide advisory resources to the city council.

==== Discrimination lawsuits ====
In 2016, the Victor Valley Family Resource Center sued Hesperia and the San Bernardino County Sheriff for closing transitional houses that the center operated in Hesperia. The center had operated houses in Hesperia for the homeless starting in 2012. The suit alleged that after the center opened a house in January 2015 to provide housing for felons on probation, the city and sheriff discriminated illegally against the center's tenants and houses.

After a district judge issued a preliminary injunction against the city, the city council altered or repealed several of the laws in dispute. The suit was settled in April 2018 for $484,831. On December 2, 2019, the United States Department of Justice filed suit against Hesperia and the San Bernardino County Sheriff's Department for "discrimination against residents and prospective residents of Hesperia because of race and national origin."

== Education ==
The Hesperia Unified School District includes the majority of the city limits. The district consists of three high schools (Hesperia High School, Sultana High School, Oak Hills High School), two continuation high schools (Mojave High and Canyon Ridge), three junior high schools (Hesperia Junior High, Ranchero Middle School, and Cedar Middle School), and 14 elementary schools.

A portion of the city limits extends into the Snowline Joint Unified School District.

Hesperia is also served by several charter and private schools. Mirus Secondary School is a 6–12 charter school in Hesperia with an independent study program. Hesperia is also served by Hesperia Christian School, founded in 1966 as a K-12 Christian School.

== Infrastructure ==
=== Transportation ===
The city's main thoroughfares include Ranchero Road, Main Street, Eucalyptus Avenue, Bear Valley Road, Escondido Avenue, Maple Avenue, Cottonwood Avenue, 11th Avenue, 7th Avenue, 3rd Avenue, Hesperia Road, C Avenue, I Avenue, Peach Avenue, and Arrowhead Lake Road. Several of the major streets feature bike lanes and there are also several recreational trails within city limits. The city is located on Interstate 15, directly north of the Cajon Pass.

Public transit operations are controlled by the Victor Valley Transit Authority. BNSF Railway provides rail service through the city on a line which connects Los Angeles to Barstow and points east. Union Pacific freight trains and Amtrak’s Southwest Chief also pass through Hesperia on the BNSF line. The nearest Amtrak station is in Victorville, 13 miles (21 km) north. Brightline West includes the option for a high speed rail station in Hesperia.

Proposed services
Preceding station	Brightline	Following station
Victor Valley toward Las Vegas	Brightline West Cajon Pass Route	Rancho Cucamonga Terminus

Hesperia Airport is a public-use facility, located around 3.2 miles (5.1 km) south of Hesperia's central business district.

=== Public safety ===
The city of Hesperia contracts with the San Bernardino County Sheriff's Department for law-enforcement services. The new 43,000 sq ft (4,000 m^{2}) substation—opened October 13, 2010—is located at 15840 Smoketree in the city's Civic Plaza, across the street from City Hall. The old 7,600 sq ft (710 m^{2}) substation, which served for many years, was on Santa Fe Avenue next to the BNSF tracks. The station provides full-service law enforcement for the city and the southern suburbs of Oak Hills and Marianas Ranchos. Additional deputies can respond as necessary from the nearby Victorville Regional Station.

Shortly after Hesperia incorporated as a city in 1988, it created its own fire protection district, which lasted through 2004. The city now has a contract with the San Bernardino County Fire Department for fire and emergency medical services.

== Notable people ==
- Anthony Adams, politician
- Arrietty, American drag performer
- Ricky Brabec, professional off-road and rally raid motorcycle racer
- George Connor (1906–2001), Indy Car driver
- Art Davie, business executive and entrepreneur
- Joel DELEŌN, Mexican American singer
- Derrin Ebert, professional baseball pitcher
- Dan Henderson, mixed martial arts (UFC) fighter
- Maximum Bob, musician
- Joel Miller, auto racing driver
- New Boyz, hip hop duo
- Buck Page, musician, singer, founder of Riders of the Purple Sage band
- Joel Pimentel, vocalist, former member of CNCO
- Marcel Reece, former fullback for the Oakland Raiders
- Dominick Reyes, mixed martial arts (UFC) fighter
- Lee Rodriguez, actress
- Larry Roeseler, professional off-road racer
- Jaden Shackelford, professional basketball player
- Chris Smith, coach and former Major League Baseball player
- Thurston Smith, businessman and politician
- Joe Stevenson, mixed martial arts fighter
- Jason Vargas, professional baseball pitcher
- David Wall, actor
- Joseph Widney, doctor and educator
