= List of U.S. county secession proposals =

The list of county secession proposals in the United States includes proposed new counties to be formed from existing counties within a given state that have not yet been formed. For counties that want to secede from their current state and to join or create another, see List of U.S. state partition proposals.

== Alabama ==
- Perdido County, Alabama would contain northern Baldwin County, divided by a straight line extending westward from the northwestern tip of Florida, and western Escambia County, west of Big Escambia Creek. (The Flomaton area is excluded via a prominent power line easement, from Big Escambia Creek to the Florida state line.) The southwestern tip of Conecuh County, also west of Big Escambia Creek, may be included as well. The headwaters of the Perdido River rise near the center of this proposed county. The Perdido County seat would be Atmore. The county has been proposed by city of Atmore backers, who believe that their growing city of over 10,000 residents should be a county seat. Furthermore, county backers believe that Atmore belongs in the Mobile-Daphne-Fairhope metropolitan combined statistical area, which would become much more likely within its own exurban-leaning county. Brewton would remain the county seat of rural-leaning Escambia County. In addition to the incorporated city of Atmore, Perdido County would include the unincorporated communities of Blacksher, Canoe, Freemanville, Huxford, Nokomis, Perdido and Tensaw.

== Alaska ==
- Chugiak and Eagle River are communities along the Glenn Highway between Anchorage and the Matanuska-Susitna Valley. Originally farming and homesteading communities with a distinct identity, they became better known starting in the 1970s as bedroom communities of Anchorage, and are currently located within its city limits (see below). In the wake of the incorporation of the Greater Anchorage Area Borough (in 1964) and subsequent efforts to merge the GAAB with Anchorage's city government (which began in 1966), Chugiak and Eagle River residents began their own efforts to attempt to secede from the GAAB. The culmination of these efforts, the Chugiak-Eagle River Borough, incorporated on August 27, 1974, with an area of 820 square miles (2,100 km^{2}) and an estimated population of 5,832, before the incorporation was invalidated by the Alaska Supreme Court on April 14, 1975. Five months later, the reconstituted GAAB and existing cities within its boundaries merged to form the Municipality of Anchorage. The population of Eagle River increased greatly during the 1980s and 1990s. This has led to renewed discussion during the 21st century on the part of Chugiak and Eagle River residents to secede from Anchorage.

== Arizona ==
- Russell Pearce, a state legislator, has proposed a bill which would ease county splits, as part of his effort to split off the East Valley portion of Maricopa County. Two such attempts were made: the first one in the early 1990s included the cities and towns of Mesa (county seat), Chandler, Gilbert, Queen Creek, Tempe, and Guadalupe, while a second attempt in the early 2000s included the same cities and towns except for Tempe and Guadalupe. County splitting rules were made more restrictive after the formation of La Paz County in 1983, which required a significant state investment to keep the county running as the result of its small tax base.
- There is an ongoing movement in Lake Havasu City to split from Mohave County.
- In the late 1930s, differences between mining and ranching interests in Cochise County spurred a proposal to split the county, with the new county's seat at Willcox, which the state Legislature ultimately rejected.
- Sierra Bonita County: proposed at the 13th Arizona Territorial Legislature in 1885, with Willcox proposed as the county seat. The proposal died by one vote.
- In the 1980s, a bill was passed in the state legislature to create an all Indian county out of the northern halves of Navajo and Apache Counties, and the northeastern half of Coconino County. Non-Indian communities in the southern region of these counties felt that the Navajo and Hopi Nations do not pay a fair share in local taxes. The bill was vetoed by then governor Bruce Babbitt, who placed a five-year moratorium on its consideration. Subsequent attempts to revive the bill failed and the issue has not resurfaced in recent years.
- Sitgreaves County, to be formed from the southern portions of Navajo and Apache Counties.
- Butte County: In 1897, James C. Goodwin, with the support of Charles T. Hayden and others, introduced a bill at the Territorial Legislature to split Maricopa County into two, with Tempe being the county seat. There have also been proposals, introduced in 1900 and 1913, to divide Maricopa County, with Mesa as the new county's seat.
- Mogollon County, Hohokam County, and O'odham County, to be formed from parts of Maricopa County. Proposals were introduced in 2023 by Republicans Alexander Kolodin and Jake Hoffman. Proposals to split Maricopa County had previously existed, but gained more support and attention following the 2020 presidential election.

== Arkansas ==
- Red River County, to be formed in 1871 from Lafayette County.

== California ==
- In Northern California, four proposed county plans failed in the 1990s: Redwood County (western parts of Mendocino and Sonoma counties), Tahoe County (eastern parts of Nevada, Placer and El Dorado counties 1996–1998), Central Valley County (of western Merced and Fresno counties), and Sequoia County (of southern Humboldt and northern Mendocino 1992–1994).
- In Southern California, there are 6 proposed counties across the Los Angeles Metropolitan Area, within Los Angeles County (about 4) and Orange County (two North/West and East/South halves, its boundary on the Newport Freeway or Laguna Freeway).
- Prior to the formation of Orange County, residents of Anaheim in 1870 pushed a bill in the state assembly for the creation of an Anaheim County. The proposal had the support of San Francisco.
- An attempt in the late 19th century (March 1893) to create San Antonio County in present-day Los Angeles and San Bernardino counties.
- In 1974, a referendum was held in El Dorado County for the secession of South Lake Tahoe County around the South Lake Tahoe. The referendum failed 46–54. Consequent proposals for a Tahoe County or High Sierra County in El Dorado, Placer County, Nevada County, and Sierra County have occasionally resurfaced when issues in the Central Valley basin conflict with issues in the more mountainous Lake Tahoe region.
- Mission County, to be formed from the northern portion of Santa Barbara County. A formal proposal was resoundingly rejected by voters in 2006. An earlier attempt in 1978 would have produced Los Padres County.
- In 1988, there was a serious effort, including a vote on the subject, to divide San Bernardino County into its urban southwestern corner, which would have retained the name, and a new Mojave County to comprise the vast, sparsely populated northern and eastern portions.
- High Desert County, to be formed largely from northern Los Angeles County as well as portions of San Bernardino County and Kern County. Proposed by late state senator Pete Knight (cf.) in 2002.
- In the late 1980s, some residents of the Coachella Valley of Riverside County failed to create a new county: Cahuilla County.
- A writer to the Los Angeles Times in 1997 indicated a sentiment from south Orange County residents that they would seek to secede from the county if it insisted on building a new airport on the former site of Marine Corps Air Station El Toro. The airport plan was eventually discarded in favor of the Orange County Great Park plan.
- In 2002, residents of the city of Corona proposed Corona County to include the western edge of Riverside County.
- In 2014, residents of rural East County San Diego proposed to secede from San Diego County, with the proposed name of Chaparral County.

== Colorado ==
- Platte County, authorized to be formed from Weld County in 1872 but never organized and then repealed in 1874.

== Delaware ==
- After 2000, a fourth Appoquinimink County was proposed to be carved out of New Castle County. The effort intended to end the zoning restrictions of the Unified Development Code on the undeveloped farmland. The proposed boundaries extended beyond the Appoquinimink Hundred to include all land south of the C&D Canal, with Middletown as the proposed seat.

== Florida ==
- Two attempts to form a separate county combining parts of Levy and Marion Counties took place. The first one was Bloxham County, and the second was Call County.
- Three attempts to form a separate county combining parts of Dade and Monroe Counties took place in 1915, 1925 and 1949; the county was to be known as Redland County and Homestead was selected as its county seat.
- In 1930, an attempt to form a county out of Palm Beach County between the Palm Beach and Hillsboro Canals was proposed with Lake Worth as its county seat. The county was never named.
- In 1947, Miami Beach attempted to form a separate city-county from parts of Dade County, with Bal Harbour, Surfside, Bay Harbor Islands, and Indian Creek also being invited to join this new entity.
- In 1960, Miami Beach and other municipalities along the Atlantic coast, unhappy with the government structure introduced by the 1957 adoption of a charter in Dade County, unsuccessfully sought to break away as a separate county.
- In 1999, a bill was introduced in the Florida Legislature that would have allowed the City of Hialeah to vote on seceding from Miami-Dade County to form a new county.
- In the early-1990s, members of the coastal communities of Duval County that rejected consolidation with Jacksonville planned to form Ocean County.
- An attempt was made in 1935 to split off the western half of Palm Beach County lying west of Twentymile Bend into a new county, due to residents of Pahokee being dissatisfied with the poor roads and distance to Palm Beach County's seat, West Palm Beach; the county's name and its seat were never chosen.
- In 1977, the Boca Raton City Council proposed the secession of Southern Palm Beach County into a new county, due to how large, inefficient, and negligent they felt the county was at the time; the county's name and its seat were never chosen.
- Due to major differences between the south end of the county (the tourist heavy side including the first and third largest communities in the county, Navarre and Gulf Breeze) and the north end (the more agriculture-based side, but where the political power is concentrated), some individuals have suggested that the south end of Santa Rosa County should break off as its own. However, while this has been suggested by some, no major or organized effort has been made to enact such actions. Names like Fairpoint County (after the peninsula the county would be focused upon) and Reagan County (for President Reagan) have been proposed, but no name has been really pushed as part of these suggestions.
- The City of Ocoee made an attempt in April 1980 to secede from Orange County due to local disdain for the county's behavior towards the city.
- The residents of Hastings tried seceding to form Hastings County, which was to be carven from Putnam and Saint John's Counties, in 1917 and 1922.
- In 1887, a bill was introduced in the Florida Legislature that would have created a Perry County from Alachua, Bradford, Clay and Putnam Counties; a second attempt to create a county from this same area - named Santa Fe County - was later proposed in 1913.
- An attempt was brought forward in 1983 to split the northern half of Lee County lying north of the Caloosahatchee River into a new county called Calusa County, with Cape Coral selected as the county seat.
- In 2021, a movement attempted to create Springs County from the communities of Newberry, High Springs, Alachua, Archer, LaCrosse, and parts of Gainesville from Alachua County.

== Georgia ==
- Milton County or New Milton County has been proposed since the early 2000s and calls for separating the northern portion from Atlanta dominated Fulton County. Residents of north Fulton County have sought to essentially re-create the original Milton County formed in 1857. The proposed plan included some of Georgia's largest cities such as Roswell (7th), Sandy Springs (8th), Johns Creek (12th), Alpharetta (13th), Milton (54th), as well as Mountain Park.

A February 2009 study completed in collaboration between the University of Georgia's Carl Vinson Institute of Government and Georgia State University's Andrew Young School of Policy Studies gave a positive analysis of the financial viability of the proposed Milton County.

== Hawaii ==
- In 2006, residents of unincorporated west Hawaii County, which currently encompasses all of Hawaii Island, met to propose the formation of Cook County. The recent movement reportedly has the support of at least one state senator.

== Idaho ==
- Selway County, proposed to be formed from parts of Idaho County and Lewis County. It was rejected in a 1917 referendum.

== Illinois ==
- Lincoln County: Southern Cook County communities, upset at Chicago-centric policies of the county government, petitioned in 2004 to split off the southern portion of the county. The southern communities argue they are in financial ruin due to Cook County policies limiting their ability to attract business, but in reverse, those against the proposal note the split was proposed mainly for the leaders of those communities to evade responsibility to Cook County for persistent political corruption, cronyism, and nepotism.
- Marquette County: proposed county to be formed from Hancock County, which made progress in the state legislature in 1844.

== Indiana ==
- In 1979 a group called Citizens for Secession attempted to prompt leaders to move Cass County, Michigan to Indiana and change the name to Michiana County.

== Kansas ==
- Garfield County: in 1887, the area around Ravanna and Eminence split from Buffalo County (now split among Lane, Finney, and Gray counties) and organized into Garfield County. Both towns were of equal influence, and contested the award of county seat. An election that year, which involved 20 Dodge City deputies including Bat Masterson, found Ravanna to have the lead. However, Eminence discovered that illegal votes had been cast for Ravanna, and in 1889 the state supreme court overturned 60 votes, awarding Garfield County seat to Eminence. In a doomsday move, Ravanna countered by hiring surveyors to determine that the new county's land area was under the minimum allowed at the time. In 1893 the Kansas state legislature invalidated the county and annexed it to Finney. Today, both Ravanna and Eminence are ghost towns.

== Louisiana ==
- Dugdemona Parish, to be carven from Catahoula Parish, Natchitoches Parish, Rapides Parish in 1850. It did not have the required number of electors, so it was never organized.
- Troy Parish, proposed in 1890, to be carven from Catahoula Parish.

== Massachusetts ==
- Throughout the history of Worcester County, the largest by area in the state stretching north–south and border-to-border between New Hampshire and Connecticut and Rhode Island, residents of the northern part of the county have pushed for a split. This never occurred, and is now a moot point, as in Massachusetts and Connecticut, county governments in those states have been dissolved, with responsibilities assumed by the state and municipalities within those counties, which now exist solely for historical and regional demarcation purposes.

== Michigan ==
- DeTour County: to be formed from portions of Chippewa and Mackinac counties, including Drummond Island.
- Lac Vieux Desert County: to be formed from portions of Gogebic, Iron and Ontonagon counties.
- Washington County: to be formed from western Marquette County.

== Minnesota ==
- Residents of Florence Township began a petition to secede from Goodhue County over plans to locate a nuclear waste disposal site in the area.
- There appears to have been a proposal to split Pine County in 2000 in an attempt to reintroduce Buchanan County, which prompted a change in county formation laws.

== Nevada ==
- Residents of Nye County, mainly in Pahrump and Tonopah, have pushed as recently as 2001 for a north–south county split, perhaps with the northern portion merging with Esmeralda County. While laws making it easier to form new counties have passed since then, this split has not occurred. Nye is the largest county in Nevada and the third largest in the entire U.S., although over 90% is federal land.
- Bullfrog County was formed by the state legislature in 1987 to gain control of Yucca Mountain. It was disincorporated when the incorporation act was found to be unconstitutional the next year.

== New Jersey ==
- The municipalities of western Essex County have discussed secession from the county, to create a new West Essex County, spurred mainly by a belief that tax laws benefit the eastern portions of the county at the expense of the western municipalities. Currently, this idea is essentially a dead movement.
- Musconetcong County, to have been formed from parts of Hunterdon and Warren Counties.

== New Mexico ==
- Rio Grande County, proposed in 1927 to be created from parts of Catron County and all of Socorro County. It failed when the proposal was deemed unconstitutional.
- South Valley County, proposed in 1995 to be created from Bernalillo County. It then failed in referendum.

== New York ==
- Adirondack County, to be formed from northern Essex and southern Franklin counties.
- Brookhaven County, to be formed from the Town of Brookhaven in central Suffolk County.
- Peconic County, to be formed from the rural eastern portion of Suffolk County.
- Salmon County, to be formed from the eastern half of Oswego County.

== North Carolina ==
- Hooper County, to be formed in 1851 from Richmond County and Robeson County. It then failed in referendum.
- Lake County, to be formed from northern Mecklenburg County.
- Lillington County, proposed in 1859, to be formed from New Hanover County. Failed in referendum.
- Providence County, to be formed from southern Mecklenburg County.

== Ohio ==
- In 1818, residents of the Barnesville greater area petitioned the state legislature for a new county seated at the city and formed from parts of Belmont, Guernsey, and Monroe counties. The proposal was rejected.

== Oklahoma ==
- Shaffer County, proposed in 1913 by Governor Lee Cruce to be created from Creek County, Payne County, and Lincoln County. A vote held on the proposal on February 7, 1914, but failed to pass.
- Swanson County, proposed in 1910 to be created from Comanche County and Kiowa County. It was declared illegal by the Oklahoma Supreme Court.

== Oregon ==
- In 1984, Wilbur Ternyik promoted an effort to form the new McCall County out of the western portions of Lane County and Douglas County. The effort was stopped by its promoter at the request of the governor. Lane County is the size of Connecticut, or of Delaware and Rhode Island combined; 4,620 square miles. "At the time we were being treated like a bunch of garbage, and we'd had enough of it," said Ternyik in 2005. Though the effort was not successful, Ternyik credited the effort with getting the county to treat their coastal constituents "a lot nicer," in part due to nervousness about losing timber revenue.
- In 2005, Keith Stanton began a petition to form a new county from the western portion of Lane County. The proposed county was to be named Siuslaw County. Stanton's petition was unsuccessful. According to Stanton, a new Siuslaw County was introduced in the legislature in 1913, at the behest of the timber industry, for reasons similar to those he noted in 2005; and some Mapleton residents revived the idea in 1975, but backed off when the county agreed to improve services.

== South Carolina ==
- Birch County, to be formed from portions of Lexington and Richland counties in the Midlands region of the state. Proposed in 2013, one-third of voters in the proposed county's area would have to petition the South Carolina Legislature to create a referendum on county creation. Two-thirds of voters in the proposed area would then be required to approve the referendum.

== Tennessee ==
- Christian County, to be formed in 1852 from parts of Gibson County, Carroll County, Henderson County, and Madison County. In 1869, there was an attempt to create Grant County out of the same area.
- Etheridge County, to be formed in 1870 from parts of Gibson County, Carroll County, Henderson County, Madison County, and Weakley County.
- Hanes County, to be formed in 1877 from parts of Benton County, Carroll County Decatur County, and McNairy County.
- Hanover County, to be formed in 1844 from parts of Fayette County and Shelby County.
- Hatchee County, to be formed in 1846 from parts of Hardeman County and McNairy County.
- Jones County, to be formed in 1844 from parts of Blount County and Monroe County.
- Neshoba County, to be formed from part of Shelby County. Its formation was threatened in 1990 by rural communities after the city of Memphis proposed that the city's financially struggling school district merge with that of the county. The merger actually took place at the start of the 2013–14 school year, with some of the towns in question forming their own school districts in response.
- Taylor County, to be created in 1852 from parts of Hardin County and Wayne County.
- Webster County, to be created in 1873 from parts of Campbell County, Claiborne County, and Union County
- Wisdom County, to be created in 1875 from parts of Hardeman County, Tennessee, McNairy County, Henderson County, and Madison County.

== Virginia ==
- Catoctin County, to be formed from western Loudoun County, in response to the voiding of zoning measures intended to slow growth in the area.
- During the desegregation era, the town of Ivor threatened to secede from Southampton County after a consolidated and integrated county high school was built in the late 1950s.

== Washington ==
- Big Bend County, proposed in 1891.
- Buchanan County, an 1856 proposal to divide Clark County.
- Cascade County
  - in the 1880s, from the eastern portions of Whatcom, Skagit, and Snohomish counties, with Sauk City as county seat,
  - in 1964, from eastern portions of King and Snohomish counties
  - in the 1970s, from the rural eastern portions of King and Pierce counties, and
  - in 2016, from the rural northwestern portions of Kittitas County.
- Cedar County: from eastern King County. A petition in support of the county collected 23,765 signatures, however the Washington Supreme Court ruled unanimously in 1998 that the state government was not obligated to act upon the petition and that the number of signatures was insufficient per the Washington State Constitution. It said that signatures from half the registered voters of the affected area are required to propose a new county, shelving many county secession movements in the state. Prior to the ruling, Washington county secession movements had interpreted the law to require signatures from only half of those who voted in the most recent election.
- Coulee County, proposed in 1905.
- Freedom County: from northern Snohomish County. Claiming frustration at what they believed to be a corrupt Snohomish County government, on April 23, 1995, the would-be commissioners of Freedom County submitted to the Washington Secretary of State a petition with 12,679 signatures calling for the secession of the northern half of Snohomish County, excluding Marysville and the Tulalip Indian reservation. The 1998 decision against the proposed Cedar County was described as a "major setback" for this proposal as well.
- Independence County: from the eastern portion of Whatcom County. Both Pioneer and Independence movements cite poor services and oppressive property regulations, plus favoritism towards Bellingham as reasons for their proposals. This assertion was bolstered by studies on three of Washington's county creation proposals (including Independence) undertaken by UW Professor Richard Zerbe, but refuted by Whatcom County Assessor Keith Wilnauer. Both were rumored to be backed by land developers. The proposal had the most momentum in the county elections of 1993, when secessionist interests won a majority of votes on the County Council. In 1994 the Independence County movement was based in Deming, Washington, organized by Doug Howard, a preacher, retail landowner, and mortgage lender. The Independence movement had ties to the Wise Use Movement, an anti-environmental interest group. The Independence movement also had ties to other county secession movements in Washington including Freedom, Pioneer, and Skykomish county proposals. Petitions to propose that Independence County be created were circulated around the proposed area between 1993 and 1994. Many signatories believed that they were signing an initiative to be placed on an upcoming ballot, but it was only a petition to the legislature. After the Washington State Public Disclosure Commission secured a disclosure hearing into the lobbying actions and finances of the organized Cedar County, Washington movement, the Independence County organized movement (as well as those of other Washington county secession movements) shut down in 1994.
- McKinley County, proposed in 1903.
- Olympic County: from western Clallam and Jefferson counties
- Palouse County, proposed in 1891 in 1903.
- Pioneer County: from northern Whatcom County. The 1998 decision against the proposed Cedar County was described as a "major setback" for this proposal as well.
- Puget Sound County: from southern King County; proposed in 1996
- Skykomish County: from southeastern Snohomish and northeastern King counties. The 1998 decision against the proposed Cedar County was described as a "major setback" for this proposal as well.
- Steptoe County, proposed in 1903.
- Washington County, proposed in 1891.
- Wenatchee County, proposed in 1893.
- Whitehorse County: from northern Snohomish County in the 1970s

== Wisconsin ==
- Century County was proposed in 1997 for creation after the year 2000. The name was selected to represent "a new county for a new century."
- Montgomery County, proposed in 1846, to be created from Iowa County.
- Tuskola County was proposed in 1850, which would be split off of Washington County. The proposed borders lie within modern Washington and Ozaukee counties.

== Wyoming ==
- Wind River County, to be formed from eastern Fremont County, with county seat at Riverton. Riverton and Lander, which as county seat would remain in Fremont County, are rival towns.
- Residents of Wright proposed a split from Campbell County in 2005.
- In 2004, state senator Stan Cooper introduced a bill to form Fossil County from the southern half of Lincoln County, which failed.
