= Deserts of California =

- Region of California
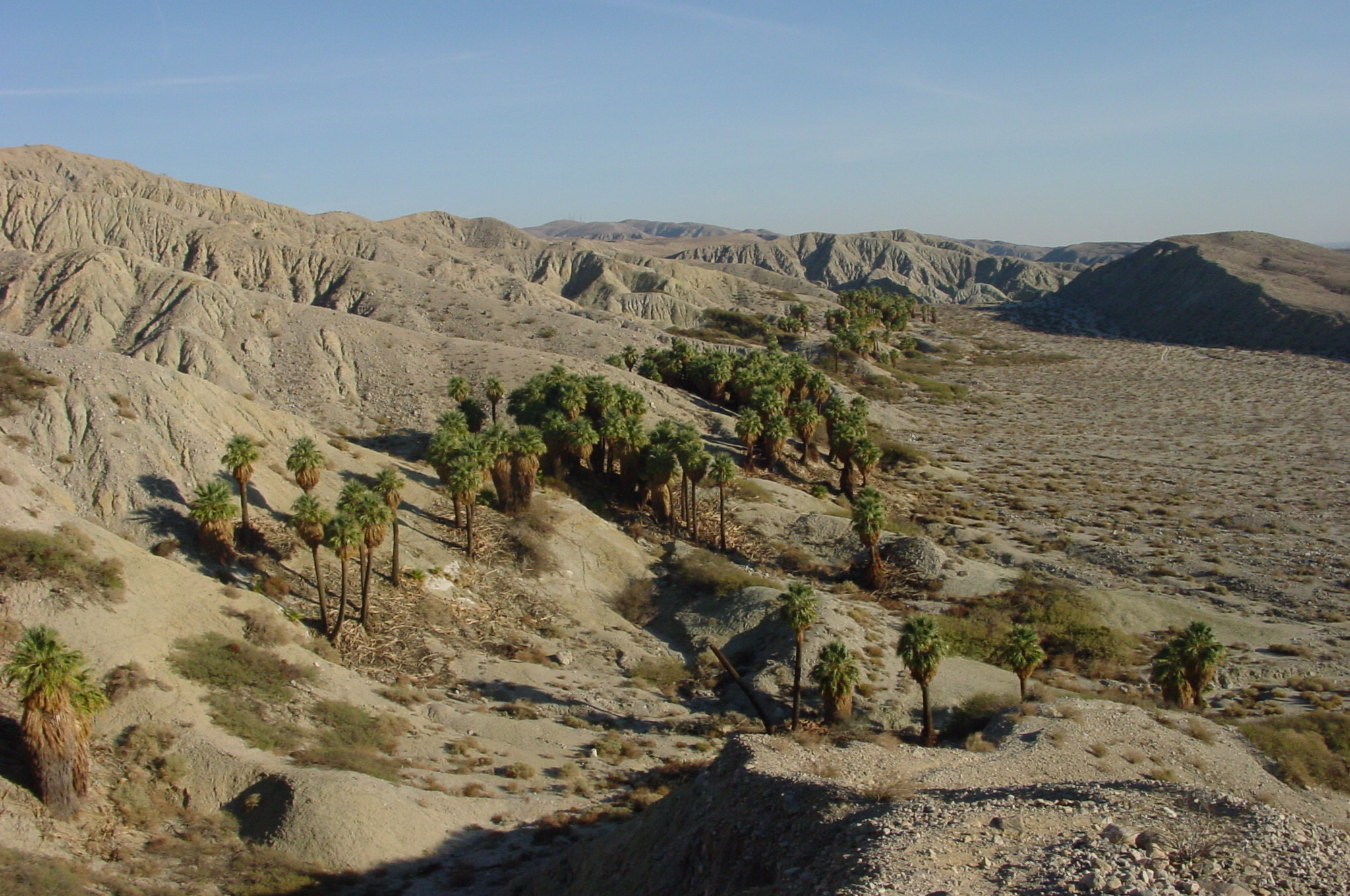
- Coachella Valley Preserve in the Colorado Desert

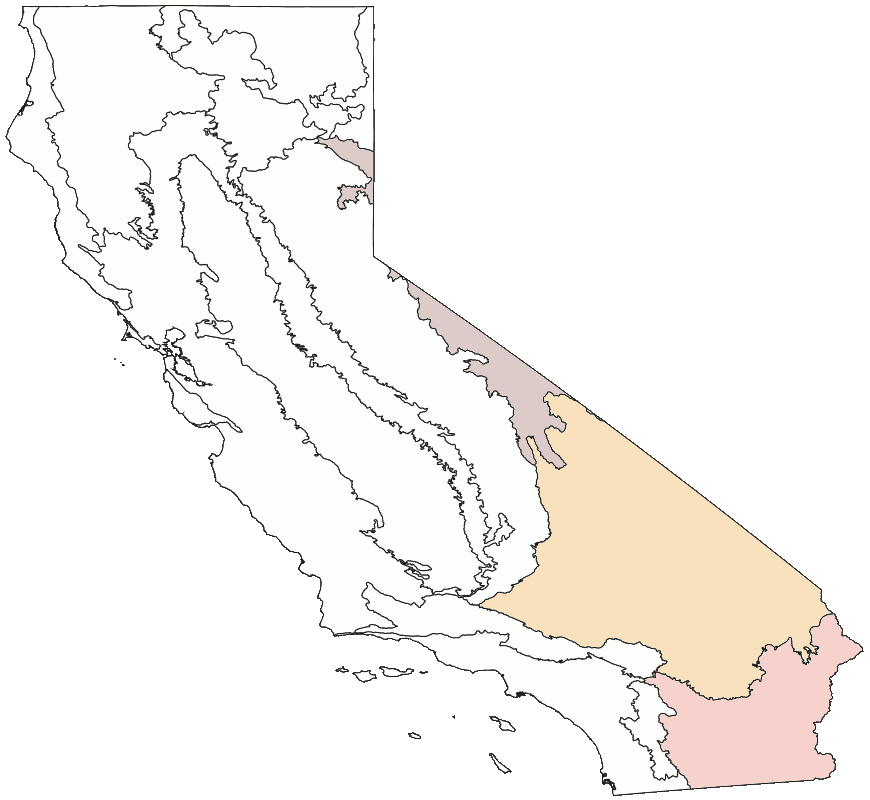
- The deserts of California as defined by the EPA
- Subregions: Great Basin Desert; Mojave Desert; Colorado Desert
- Core cities: Lancaster, Palmdale, Victorville, Hesperia, Indio, El Centro and Palm Springs

The deserts of California (also known as the California deserts and the California Desert) are the distinct deserts that each have unique ecosystems and habitats. The deserts are home to a sociocultural and historical "Old West" collection of legends, districts, and communities, and they also form a popular tourism region of dramatic natural features and recreational development. Part of this region was even proposed to become a new county due to cultural, economic and geographic differences relative to the rest of the more urban region.

== Geography ==
There are three main deserts in California: the Mojave Desert, the Colorado Desert, and the Great Basin Desert. The Mojave Desert is bounded by the Tehachapi Mountains on the northwest, the San Gabriel and San Bernardino Mountains on the south, and extends eastward to California's borders with Arizona and Nevada; it also forms portions of northwest Arizona. The Colorado Desert lies in the southeastern corner of the state, between the Colorado River and the Transverse Ranges, and continues into Mexico and Arizona to the south and east, (as the named Sonoran Desert). The Great Basin desert lies immediately to the east of the Sierra Nevada and extends eastward into the state of Nevada.

The deserts encompass parts of Lassen, Plumas, Mono, and Inyo Counties; all of Imperial County; parts of Los Angeles, Kern, San Diego, and Riverside Counties; and most of northern and eastern San Bernardino County. The major urban populations of western San Diego County, Orange County, the Inland Empire, and Greater Los Angeles are over the high mountains toward the Pacific Ocean.

Part of the region was even proposed to become a new county due to cultural, economic and geographic differences relative to the rest of the more urban region.

=== Mojave Desert ===
The topographical boundaries include the Tehachapi Mountains to the northwest, together with the San Gabriel and San Bernardino mountain ranges to the south. The mountain boundaries are quite distinct since they are outlined by the two largest faults in California – the San Andreas Fault and the Garlock Fault. The Mojave Desert in California includes the colloquially defined High Desert region. The Great Basin shrub steppe lies to the north of the Mojave Desert; the warmer Sonoran Desert and its subregion the Colorado Desert lie to the south and east.

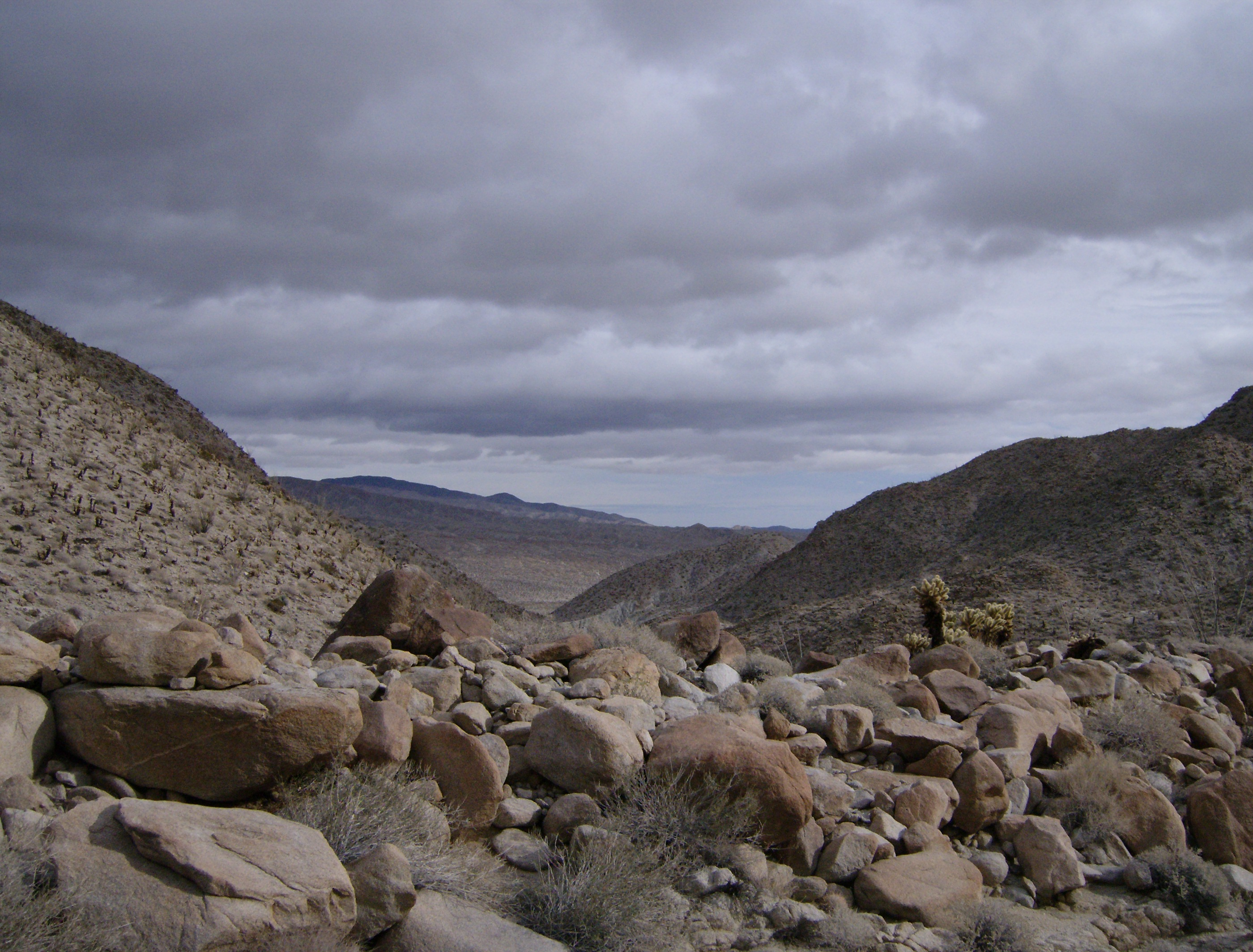
Desert landscape in the Mojave Desert

=== Colorado Desert ===
The Colorado Desert is a northwesterly part of the larger Sonoran Desert, which extends across southwest North America. The Colorado Desert region encompasses approximately 7 million acres (2,800,000 ha), reaching from the Northwest Mexico border region in the south to the higher-elevation Mojave Desert in the north and from the Colorado River in the east to the Laguna Mountains of the Peninsular Ranges in the west. The area includes the heavily irrigated Coachella, Palo Verde, and Imperial Valleys. The Sonoran/Colorado Desert in California includes the colloquially defined Low Desert region.

=== Great Basin Desert ===
The Great Basin Desert is the only "cold" desert in the country, where most precipitation falls in the form of snow. The Great Basin Desert exists because of the "rainshadow effect" created by the Sierra Nevada of eastern California. When prevailing winds from the Pacific Ocean rise to go over the Sierra, the air cools and loses most of its moisture as rain. By the time the winds cross over the mountains and sweep down the far side, they are very dry and absorb moisture from the surrounding area. This drying effect is responsible for creating the Great Basin Desert.

== Ecology and climate ==
The desert region of California is characterized by low rainfall, caused by the rain shadow of mountain ranges to the west of the desert region. The Mojave Desert receives from 3 to 10 inches (76 to 254 mm) of rain per year, while the Colorado Desert receives from 2 to 6 inches (51 to 152 mm). The driest spot in California is Death Valley, which averages 1.5 inches (38 mm) of precipitation per year. The soils of California deserts also tend to be alkaline, which adds to the stress of drought on plants.

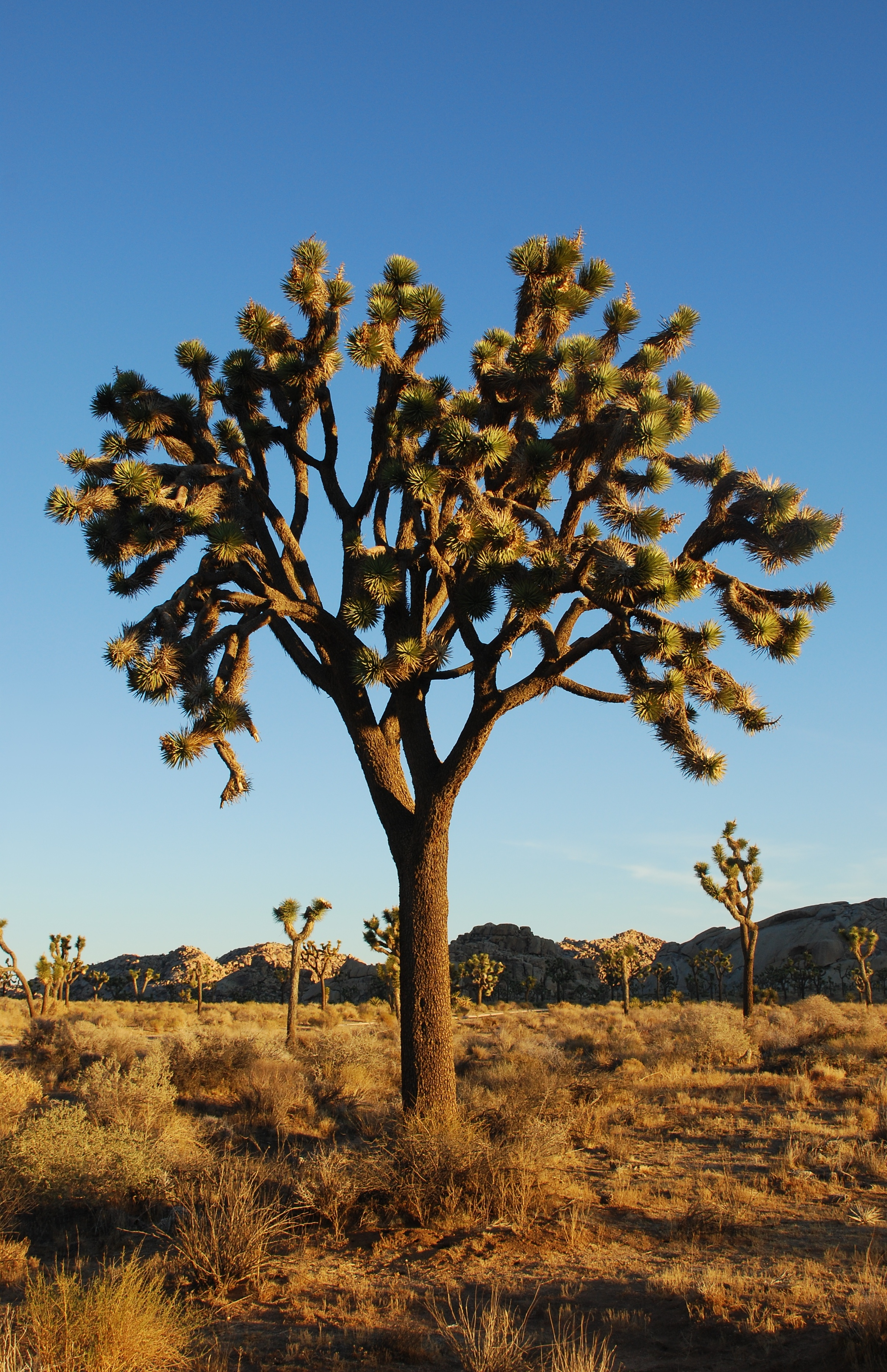
Joshua trees are characteristic of the Mojave Desert

The Mojave Desert is considered a high desert, because elevations can range up to 11,000 feet (3,400 m). The Mojave Desert is characterized by the presence of Yucca brevifolia, the Joshua Tree, which as an indicator species of the Mojave Desert, extends southeasterly into Mohave County, Arizona, and even further, all parts of northwest Arizona. Other common plants of the Mojave Desert include creosote bush, blackbrush, greasewood and saltbush. Higher elevations host Western juniper and Pinyon pine.

The Colorado Desert is a low desert, with elevations running from −230 to 1,000 feet (−70 to 305 m) above sea level. Unlike the other California deserts, the Colorado Desert gets significant rain from the North American Monsoon in August and September. The Colorado Desert hosts saguaro cactus, Sonoran creosote bush, and Salton Sea saltbush.

The Great Basin desert in California can also reach up to 11,000 feet (3,400 m) of elevation. Plants in the Great Basin Desert are well adapted to the harsh conditions. These plants include Big sagebrush, Pinyon pine, Utah juniper, Low sagebrush, Shadscale, and Bristlecone pine. Sagebrush, a very common resident of the Great Basin, is well adapted to the area. The Big sagebrush root system can extend as much as 90 feet in circumference. This adaptation allows the plant to catch as much water as possible when the rains do come. Mormon tea possesses modified leaves. The leaves are very small and are not the primary area for photosynthesis. The chlorophyll filled stems carry out the primary photosynthesis. Four-wing saltbush excretes salt through its leaves to prevent build-up of lethal salts in the plant. The plants on the alkaline flats have a high internal concentration of salt and are able to extract water other plants can not.

Common animals of the California deserts include the desert bighorn sheep, desert kit fox, coyote, spotted skunk, spotted bat, black-tailed jackrabbit, ground squirrels, kangaroo rat, white-footed mouse, and desert tortoise.

== History ==
Before the European exploration of North America, tribes of Native Americans, such as the Mohave (in the Mojave desert), the Chemehuevi (in the Great Basin desert), and the Quechan (in the Colorado desert) were hunter-gatherers living in the California deserts.

European explorers started exploring the deserts beginning in the 18th century. Francisco Garcés, a Franciscan friar, was the first explorer of the Colorado and Mojave deserts in 1776. Garcés recorded information about the original inhabitants of the deserts.

Later, as American interests expanded into California, American explorers started probing the California deserts. Jedediah Smith travelled through the Great Basin and Mojave deserts in 1826, finally reaching the San Gabriel Mission. John C. Frémont explored the Great Basin, proving that water did not flow out of it to the ocean, and provided maps that the forty-niners used to get to California.

The California Gold Rush jumpstarted economic activity in the California deserts. Mining for silver, gold, and lead became important in both the Mojave and the Great Basin deserts. Mining stimulated the creation of transportation systems, such as the Tonopah and Tidewater Railroad.

== Tourism ==
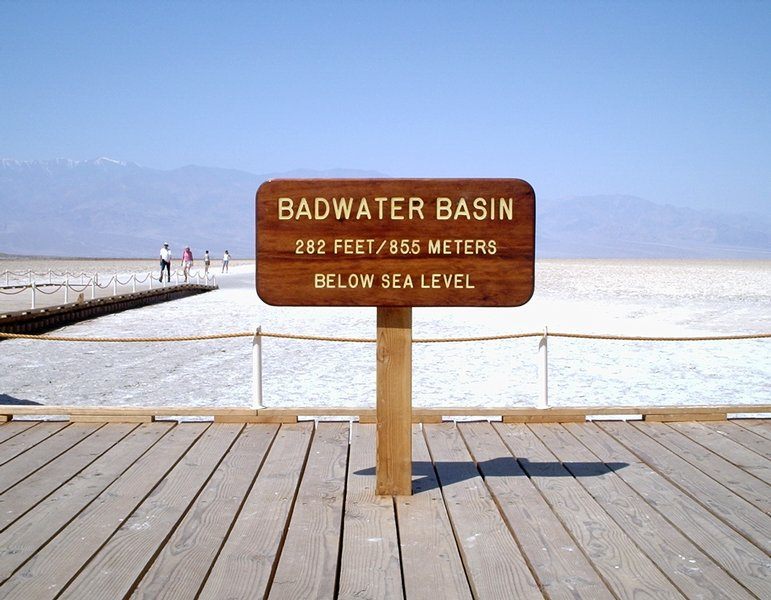
Badwater Basin elevation sign

In 1994, the California Desert Protection Act protected millions of acres within the Death Valley and Joshua Tree National Parks and the Mojave National Preserve. Within these parks and preserves, visitors can view unique landscapes, plants, and animals. Badwater Basin, the lowest point in the United States lies within Death Valley National Park.

== List of towns ==
Towns in the California desert with population more than 20,000:

- Lancaster (pop. 173,516)
- Palmdale (pop. 169,450)
- Victorville (pop. 134,810)
- Hesperia (pop. 99,818)
- Indio (pop. 89,137)
- Apple Valley (pop. 75,791)
- Cathedral City (pop. 51,493)
- Palm Desert (pop. 51,163)
- Palm Springs (pop. 44,575)
- El Centro (pop. 44,322)
- Coachella (pop. 41,941)
- Calexico (pop. 38,633)
- Adelanto (pop. 38,046)
- La Quinta (pop. 37,558)
- Desert Hot Springs (pop. 32,512)
- Twentynine Palms (pop. 28,065)
- Ridgecrest (pop. 27,959)
- Brawley (pop. 26,416)
- Barstow (pop. 25,415)
- Yucca Valley (pop. 21,738)

== See also ==
- High Desert
- Low Desert
- Southern California
- Lower Colorado River Valley
- List of California desert topics
- List of North American Deserts
