= Cascade County =

Cascade County may refer to:

- Cascade County, Montana
- Cascade County, Washington (proposed new county)
