= List of counties in California =

Counties of California
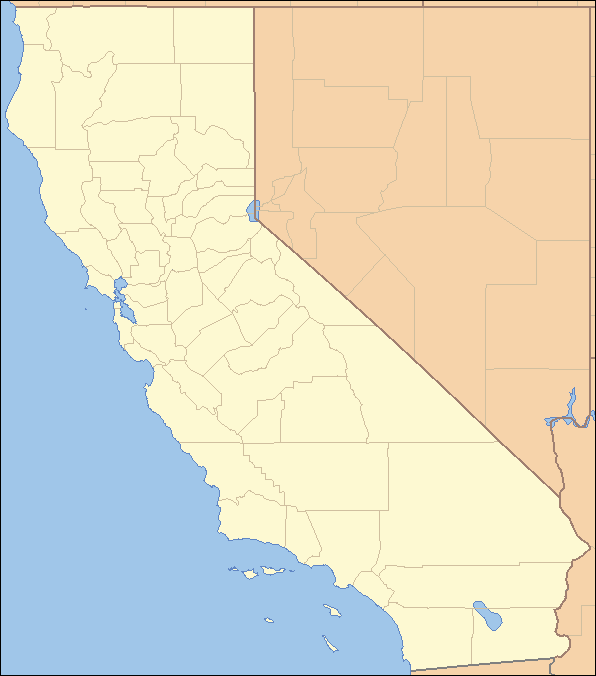
- Location: State of California
- Created: 1850 (27 original counties)
- Number: 58 counties
- Populations: Minimum: Alpine, 1,043; Maximum: Los Angeles, 9,694,934
- Areas: Minimum: San Francisco, 47 square miles (120 km^{2}); Maximum: San Bernardino, 20,062 square miles (51,960 km^{2})
- Government: Local government in California
- Subdivisions: Charter cities

The U.S. state of California is divided into 58 counties. The state was first divided into 27 counties on February 18, 1850. These were further sub-divided to form sixteen additional counties by 1860. Another fourteen counties were formed through further subdivision from 1861 to 1893. The most recent county to form was Imperial County, in 1907. California is home to San Bernardino County, the largest county in the contiguous United States, as well as Los Angeles County, the most populous county in the United States.

The counties of California are local arms of the State of California, described by the Supreme Court of California as agents ("the county is merely a political subdivision of state government, exercising only the powers of the state, granted by the state…'") and the property they hold is held on behalf of all the people of the state. As such, the State Legislature may delegate any of the functions of the State to the counties but likewise can reassume any delegated duties.

California counties are general law counties by default. Still, they may be chartered as provided in Article XI, Section 3 of the California Constitution. A charter county is granted limited home rule powers. Of the 58 counties in California, the following 15 are governed under a charter: Alameda, Butte, El Dorado, Fresno, Los Angeles, Orange, Placer, Sacramento, San Bernardino, San Diego, San Francisco, San Mateo, Santa Clara, Shasta, and Tehama.

Nine counties in California are named for saints, tied with Louisiana for the largest number. This count omits Santa Cruz ("Holy Cross") County, not named for a saint; Merced County and Los Angeles County, both of whose names refer to the Virgin Mary (Our Lady of Mercy (Merced) and Our Lady Queen of The Angels (Los Angeles)); and Ventura County, whose name is a shortening of the name of St. Bonaventure, the namesake of the local mission.

== List ==
County	FIPS code	County seat	Est.	Formed from	Etymology	General Law or Charter	Population (2025)	Area	Map
Alameda County	001	Oakland	March 25, 1853	Contra Costa and Santa Clara	The oak and other trees, once abundant in the region; alameda is Spanish for "avenue shaded by trees" or "cottonwood grove".	Charter	1,636,630	738 sq mi (1,911 km^{2})	State map highlighting Alameda County
Alpine County	003	Markleeville	March 16, 1864	Amador, El Dorado, Calaveras, Mono and Tuolumne	Location high in the Sierra Nevada; alpine refers to the Alps or other mountains.	General Law	1,043	739 sq mi (1,914 km^{2})	State map highlighting Alpine County
Amador County	005	Jackson	June 14, 1854	Calaveras	Jose Maria Amador (1794–1883), a soldier, rancher, and miner who, along with several Native Americans, established a successful gold mining camp near present-day Amador City in 1848	General Law	41,876	593 sq mi (1,536 km^{2})	State map highlighting Amador County
Butte County	007	Oroville	February 18, 1850	original	Sutter Buttes, which were mistakenly thought to be in the county at the time of its establishment	Charter	209,211	1,640 sq mi (4,248 km^{2})	State map highlighting Butte County
Calaveras County	009	San Andreas	February 18, 1850	original	Calaveras River; calaveras is Spanish for "skulls".	General Law	46,605	1,020 sq mi (2,642 km^{2})	State map highlighting Calaveras County
Colusa County	011	Colusa	February 18, 1850	original	Rancho Colus land grant from Mexico	General Law	21,836	1,151 sq mi (2,981 km^{2})	State map highlighting Colusa County
Contra Costa County	013	Martinez	February 18, 1850	original	Location across San Francisco Bay from San Francisco; contra costa is Spanish for "opposite coast".	General Law	1,170,070	720 sq mi (1,865 km^{2})	State map highlighting Contra Costa County
Del Norte County	015	Crescent City	March 2, 1857	Klamath	Location along California's northern border; del norte is Spanish for "northern".	General Law	26,410	1,008 sq mi (2,611 km^{2})	State map highlighting Del Norte County
El Dorado County	017	Placerville	February 18, 1850	original	El Dorado, a mythical city of gold, owing to the area's significance in the California Gold Rush	Charter	192,323	1,712 sq mi (4,434 km^{2})	State map highlighting El Dorado County
Fresno County	019	Fresno	April 19, 1856	Mariposa, Merced and Tulare	The city of Fresno; fresno is Spanish for "ash tree".	Charter	1,035,456	5,963 sq mi (15,444 km^{2})	State map highlighting Fresno County
Glenn County	021	Willows	May 5, 1891	Colusa	Hugh J. Glenn, a California businessman and politician	General Law	28,141	1,315 sq mi (3,406 km^{2})	State map highlighting Glenn County
Humboldt County	023	Eureka	May 12, 1853	Trinity	Alexander von Humboldt, a German naturalist and explorer	General Law	131,647	3,573 sq mi (9,254 km^{2})	State map highlighting Humboldt County
Imperial County	025	El Centro	August 12, 1907	San Diego	Imperial Valley, named after the Imperial Land Company	General Law	181,411	4,175 sq mi (10,813 km^{2})	State map highlighting Imperial County
Inyo County	027	Independence	March 22, 1866	Mono and Tulare	Exact etymology disputed; early settlers believed Inyo to be the native name for area mountains, but it may be the name of a Mono Indian leader.	General Law	18,158	10,192 sq mi (26,397 km^{2})	State map highlighting Inyo County
Kern County	029	Bakersfield	April 2, 1866	Los Angeles and Tulare	Edward Kern, cartographer for John C. Fremont's 1845 expedition	General Law	927,068	8,142 sq mi (21,088 km^{2})	State map highlighting Kern County
Kings County	031	Hanford	May 23, 1893	Tulare	Kings River; original Spanish name Rio de los Santos Reyes ("River of the Holy Kings")	General Law	154,327	1,390 sq mi (3,600 km^{2})	State map highlighting Kings County
Lake County	033	Lakeport	May 20, 1861	Napa	Clear Lake	General Law	67,772	1,258 sq mi (3,258 km^{2})	State map highlighting Lake County
Lassen County	035	Susanville	April 1, 1864	Plumas and Shasta, and now defunct Lake County, Nevada	Peter Lassen, a Danish naturalist and explorer	General Law	28,117	4,558 sq mi (11,805 km^{2})	State map highlighting Lassen County
Los Angeles County	037	Los Angeles	February 18, 1850	original	The city of Los Angeles, derived from the original Spanish name El Pueblo de Nuestra Señora la Reina de los Angeles ("The Village of Our Lady, the Queen of the Angels")	Charter	9,694,934	4,060 sq mi (10,515 km^{2})	State map highlighting Los Angeles County
Madera County	039	Madera	May 16, 1893	Fresno	The city of Madera, which was named for the lumber industry it was created for; madera is Spanish for "wood" or "timber".	General Law	167,927	2,138 sq mi (5,537 km^{2})	State map highlighting Madera County
Marin County	041	San Rafael	February 18, 1850	original	Chief Marin, "great chief of the tribe Licatiut" (a branch of the Coast Miwok people)	General Law	253,694	520 sq mi (1,347 km^{2})	State map highlighting Marin County
Mariposa County	043	Mariposa	February 18, 1850	original	The city of Mariposa; mariposa is Spanish for "butterfly".	General Law	16,918	1,451 sq mi (3,758 km^{2})	State map highlighting Mariposa County
Mendocino County	045	Ukiah	February 18, 1850	original	Antonio de Mendoza, first viceroy of New Spain	General Law	88,122	3,509 sq mi (9,088 km^{2})	State map highlighting Mendocino County
Merced County	047	Merced	April 19, 1855	Mariposa	The city of Merced, derived from the original Spanish name El Río de Nuestra Señora de la Merced ("River of Our Lady of Mercy")	General Law	297,260	1,929 sq mi (4,996 km^{2})	State map highlighting Merced County
Modoc County	049	Alturas	February 17, 1874	Siskiyou	The Modoc people	General Law	8,426	3,944 sq mi (10,215 km^{2})	State map highlighting Modoc County
Mono County	051	Bridgeport	April 24, 1861	Calaveras, Fresno and Mariposa	Mono Lake; derived from Monachi, a Yokuts name for native peoples of the Sierra Nevada	General Law	12,505	3,044 sq mi (7,884 km^{2})	State map highlighting Mono County
Monterey County	053	Salinas	February 18, 1850	original	Derived from Monterey Bay, which was named for a Viceroy of New Spain, Gaspar de Zúñiga, 5th Count of Monterrey	General Law	433,729	3,322 sq mi (8,604 km^{2})	State map highlighting Monterey County
Napa County	055	Napa	February 18, 1850	original	Disputed origin; possibly derived from the Patwin word napo, meaning "home"	General Law	132,949	754 sq mi (1,953 km^{2})	State map highlighting Napa County
Nevada County	057	Nevada City	April 25, 1851	Yuba	The phrase Sierra Nevada; nevada is Spanish for "snow-covered", referencing the area's high elevation. The bordering state was named after the county, which was named after Nevada City.	General Law	101,911	958 sq mi (2,481 km^{2})	State map highlighting Nevada County
Orange County	059	Santa Ana	June 4, 1889	Los Angeles	Oranges, to illustrate a perception of a region with a semi-tropical atmosphere to those from the eastern parts of the United States	Charter	3,149,507	790 sq mi (2,046 km^{2})	State map highlighting Orange County
Placer County	061	Auburn	April 25, 1851	Sacramento	Placer mining, a reference to the area being a center of the California Gold Rush	Charter	442,081	1,404 sq mi (3,636 km^{2})	State map highlighting Placer County
Plumas County	063	Quincy	April 1, 1854	Butte	The Feather River; plumas is Spanish for "feathers".	General Law	18,583	2,553 sq mi (6,612 km^{2})	State map highlighting Plumas County
Riverside County	065	Riverside	May 2, 1893	San Bernardino and San Diego	The city of Riverside, named for its location on the Santa Ana River	General Law	2,544,916	7,208 sq mi (18,669 km^{2})	State map highlighting Riverside County
Sacramento County	067	Sacramento	February 18, 1850	original	The city of Sacramento, named after the Eucharist (called in Spanish Santísimo Sacramento, literally "Most Holy Sacrament")	Charter	1,618,460	966 sq mi (2,502 km^{2})	State map highlighting Sacramento County
San Benito County	069	Hollister	February 12, 1874	Monterey	Saint Benedict (Benito is a Spanish diminutive of Benedict).	General Law	70,082	1,389 sq mi (3,597 km^{2})	State map highlighting San Benito County
San Bernardino County	071	San Bernardino	April 26, 1853	Los Angeles	The city of San Bernardino, named after Saint Bernardino of Siena (Spanish for Saint Bernardine)	Charter	2,224,091	20,062 sq mi (51,960 km^{2})	State map highlighting San Bernardino County
San Diego County	073	San Diego	February 18, 1850	original	The city of San Diego, from Mission San Diego (Spanish for Saint Didacus)	Charter	3,282,248	4,204 sq mi (10,888 km^{2})	State map highlighting San Diego County
City and County of San Francisco	075	San Francisco	February 18, 1850	original	The city of San Francisco, from Presidio of San Francisco and Mission San Francisco de Asís, named after Saint Francis of Assisi (Spanish for Saint Francis)	Charter	826,079	47 sq mi (122 km^{2})	State map highlighting City and County of San Francisco
San Joaquin County	077	Stockton	February 18, 1850	original	Spanish for Saint Joachim, father of the Virgin Mary	General Law	823,815	1,399 sq mi (3,623 km^{2})	State map highlighting San Joaquin County
San Luis Obispo County	079	San Luis Obispo	February 18, 1850	original	The city of San Luis Obispo, from Mission San Luis Obispo, named after Saint Louis of Toulouse (Spanish for Saint Louis, the Bishop)	General Law	282,367	3,304 sq mi (8,557 km^{2})	State map highlighting San Luis Obispo County
San Mateo County	081	Redwood City	July 1, 1856	San Francisco and Santa Cruz	Spanish for Saint Matthew	Charter	743,568	449 sq mi (1,163 km^{2})	State map highlighting San Mateo County
Santa Barbara County	083	Santa Barbara	February 18, 1850	original	The city of Santa Barbara, from Mission Santa Barbara, (Spanish for Saint Barbara)	General Law	442,065	2,553 sq mi (6,612 km^{2})	State map highlighting Santa Barbara County
Santa Clara County	085	San Jose	February 18, 1850	original	City of Santa Clara, from Mission Santa Clara de Asís, named for Saint Clare of Assisi (Spanish for Saint Clare)	Charter	1,914,391	1,291 sq mi (3,344 km^{2})	State map highlighting Santa Clara County
Santa Cruz County	087	Santa Cruz	February 18, 1850	original	The city of Santa Cruz, from Mission Santa Cruz (Spanish for "holy cross")	General Law	258,852	446 sq mi (1,155 km^{2})	State map highlighting Santa Cruz County
Shasta County	089	Redding	February 18, 1850	original	Mount Shasta; the indigenous Shasta people	General Law (becoming Charter as of 1 January 2025)	181,648	3,786 sq mi (9,806 km^{2})	State map highlighting Shasta County
Sierra County	091	Downieville	April 16, 1852	Yuba	Sierra is Spanish for "mountain range", a reference to the area's topography	General Law	3,098	953 sq mi (2,468 km^{2})	State map highlighting Sierra County
Siskiyou County	093	Yreka	March 22, 1852	Shasta and Klamath	Siskiyou Mountains; exact etymology of Siskiyou is disputed.	General Law	42,013	6,287 sq mi (16,283 km^{2})	State map highlighting Siskiyou County
Solano County	095	Fairfield	February 18, 1850	original	Chief Solano of the Suisunes	General Law	455,376	828 sq mi (2,145 km^{2})	State map highlighting Solano County
Sonoma County	097	Santa Rosa	February 18, 1850	original	Exact etymology disputed; probably a Pomo term meaning "valley of the moon", which references a native legend about spiritual activity in the area	General Law	486,444	1,576 sq mi (4,082 km^{2})	State map highlighting Sonoma County
Stanislaus County	099	Modesto	April 5, 1854	Tuolumne	Stanislaus River, named after Estanislao, a native of the area when California was under Spanish and Mexican rule	General Law	557,719	1,495 sq mi (3,872 km^{2})	State map highlighting Stanislaus County
Sutter County	101	Yuba City	February 18, 1850	original	John Sutter, a Swiss pioneer of California associated with the California Gold Rush	General Law	98,787	603 sq mi (1,562 km^{2})	State map highlighting Sutter County
Tehama County	103	Red Bluff	April 9, 1856	Butte, Colusa and Shasta	The city of Tehama, probably a native term describing its location	Charter	64,665	2,951 sq mi (7,643 km^{2})	State map highlighting Tehama County
Trinity County	105	Weaverville	April 20, 1850	original	The city of Trinidad, Spanish for "trinity"	General Law	15,720	3,179 sq mi (8,234 km^{2})	State map highlighting Trinity County
Tulare County	107	Visalia	February 18, 1852	Mariposa	Tulare Lake, which is named after the tule rush (Schoenoplectus acutus) that grew in the marshes and sloughs along its shores	General Law	485,146	4,824 sq mi (12,494 km^{2})	State map highlighting Tulare County
Tuolumne County	109	Sonora	February 18, 1850	original	Exact etymology disputed; probably a corruption of the native term talmalamne, which means "cluster of stone wigwams", a reference to local cave dwelling tribes	General Law	53,160	2,236 sq mi (5,791 km^{2})	State map highlighting Tuolumne County
Ventura County	111	Ventura	January 1, 1873	Santa Barbara	The city of Ventura, derived from Mission San Buenaventura (Spanish for St. Bonaventure)	General Law	830,851	1,846 sq mi (4,781 km^{2})	State map highlighting Ventura County
Yolo County	113	Woodland	February 18, 1850	original	The Yolan people, a local Native American tribe	General Law	224,410	1,012 sq mi (2,621 km^{2})	State map highlighting Yolo County
Yuba County	115	Marysville	February 18, 1850	original	Named either by the Maidu people, a local Native American tribe who live on the banks of the Feather and Yuba Rivers, for one of their villages, or by Gabriel Moraga for the wild grapes (Vitis californica) that grow abundantly at the edge of the rivers (uva being Spanish for "grape")	General Law	88,691	630 sq mi (1,632 km^{2})	State map highlighting Yuba County

== Racial / Ethnic Profile of counties in California (2020 Census) ==
Racial / Ethnic Profile of counties in California (2020 Census)
Following is a table of counties in California by race/ethnicity. The majority racial/ethnic group is coded per the key below.

Majority minority with no dominant group
Majority White
Majority Black
Majority Hispanic
Majority Asian
Majority Native American

Racial and ethnic composition of counties in California (2020 Census) (NH = Non-Hispanic) Note: the US Census treats Hispanic/Latino as an ethnic category. This table excludes Latinos from the racial categories and assigns them to a separate category. Hispanics/Latinos may be of any race.
County	Location of County	Total Population	White alone (NH)	%	Black or African American alone (NH)	%	Native American or Alaska Native alone (NH)	%	Asian alone (NH)	%	Pacific Islander alone (NH)	%	Other race alone (NH)	%	Mixed race or Multiracial (NH)	%	Hispanic or Latino (any race)	%
Alameda		1,682,353	472,277	28.07%	159,499	9.48%	4,131	0.25%	540,511	32.13%	13,209	0.79%	10,440	0.62%	88,537	5.26%	393,749	23.40%
Alpine		1,204	801	66.53%	10	0.83%	214	17.77%	12	1.00%	0	0.00%	7	0.58%	76	6.31%	84	6.98%
Amador		40,474	29,725	73.44%	1,215	3.00%	577	1.43%	554	1.37%	73	0.18%	249	0.62%	2,067	5.11%	6,014	14.86%
Butte		211,632	139,651	65.99%	3,320	1.57%	3,050	1.44%	10,333	4.88%	508	0.24%	1,184	0.56%	13,474	6.37%	40,112	18.95%
Calaveras		45,292	34,668	76.54%	334	0.74%	497	1.10%	706	1.56%	75	0.17%	268	0.59%	2,879	6.36%	5,865	12.95%
Colusa		21,839	6,941	31.78%	182	0.83%	280	1.28%	252	1.15%	70	0.32%	92	0.42%	546	2.50%	13,476	61.71%
Contra Costa		1,165,927	455,421	39.06%	97,994	8.40%	2,553	0.22%	214,520	18.40%	5,720	0.49%	8,366	0.72%	66,453	5.70%	314,900	27.01%
Del Norte		27,743	16,262	58.62%	841	3.03%	2,136	7.70%	826	2.98%	28	0.10%	122	0.44%	2,207	7.96%	5,321	19.18%
El Dorado		191,185	140,141	73.30%	1,436	0.75%	1,273	0.67%	9,024	4.72%	276	0.14%	1,215	0.64%	11,361	5.94%	26,459	13.84%
Fresno		1,008,654	271,889	26.96%	44,295	4.39%	6,074	0.60%	109,665	10.87%	1,233	0.12%	5,209	0.52%	29,546	2.93%	540,743	53.61%
Glenn		28,917	13,897	48.06%	140	0.48%	531	1.84%	626	2.16%	39	0.13%	144	0.50%	999	3.45%	12,541	43.37%
Humboldt		136,463	93,316	68.38%	1,729	1.27%	7,454	5.46%	3,495	2.56%	436	0.32%	1,091	0.80%	10,407	7.63%	18,535	13.58%
Imperial		179,702	16,813	9.36%	3,846	2.14%	1,584	0.88%	2,244	1.25%	82	0.05%	519	0.29%	1,587	0.88%	153,027	85.16%
Inyo		19,016	11,035	58.03%	85	0.45%	2,189	11.51%	273	1.44%	13	0.07%	87	0.46%	935	4.92%	4,399	23.13%
Kern		909,235	279,600	30.75%	46,776	5.14%	5,197	0.57%	44,257	4.87%	1,127	0.12%	4,557	0.50%	28,563	3.14%	499,158	54.90%
Kings		152,486	44,361	29.09%	8,300	5.44%	1,690	1.11%	5,511	3.61%	331	0.22%	713	0.47%	4,973	3.26%	86,607	56.80%
Lake		68,163	44,202	64.85%	1,158	1.70%	1,737	2.55%	940	1.38%	89	0.13%	386	0.57%	4,209	6.17%	15,442	22.65%
Lassen		32,730	19,534	59.68%	2,244	6.86%	939	2.87%	472	1.44%	283	0.86%	142	0.43%	1,585	4.84%	7,531	23.01%
Los Angeles		10,014,009	2,563,609	25.60%	760,689	7.60%	18,453	0.18%	1,474,237	14.72%	20,522	0.20%	58,683	0.59%	313,053	3.13%	4,804,763	47.98%
Madera		156,255	48,399	30.97%	4,131	2.64%	1,738	1.11%	3,581	2.29%	122	0.08%	723	0.46%	4,383	2.81%	93,178	59.63%
Marin		262,321	173,149	66.01%	6,120	2.33%	555	0.21%	16,175	6.17%	457	0.17%	2,040	0.78%	14,415	5.50%	49,410	18.84%
Mariposa		17,131	12,838	74.94%	105	0.61%	410	2.39%	287	1.68%	15	0.09%	114	0.67%	1,222	7.13%	2,140	12.49%
Mendocino		91,601	56,205	61.36%	607	0.66%	3,528	3.85%	1,730	1.89%	110	0.12%	592	0.65%	4,896	5.34%	23,933	26.13%
Merced		281,202	68,729	24.44%	8,191	2.91%	1,164	0.41%	19,824	7.05%	617	0.22%	1,242	0.44%	7,578	2.69%	173,857	61.83%
Modoc		8,700	6,446	74.09%	66	0.76%	387	4.45%	61	0.70%	13	0.15%	56	0.64%	412	4.74%	1,259	14.47%
Mono		13,195	8,679	65.77%	68	0.52%	177	1.34%	159	1.21%	26	0.20%	78	0.59%	501	3.80%	3,507	26.58%
Monterey		439,035	120,077	27.35%	9,051	2.06%	1,314	0.30%	25,123	5.72%	1,859	0.42%	2,170	0.49%	14,120	3.22%	265,321	60.43%
Napa		138,019	68,909	49.93%	2,300	1.67%	507	0.37%	10,520	7.62%	316	0.23%	910	0.66%	5,728	4.15%	48,829	35.38%
Nevada		102,241	82,810	80.99%	416	0.41%	695	0.68%	1,371	1.34%	119	0.12%	617	0.60%	5,797	5.67%	10,416	10.19%
Orange		3,186,989	1,198,655	37.61%	49,304	1.55%	5,298	0.17%	699,124	21.94%	7,714	0.24%	14,818	0.46%	125,242	3.93%	1,086,834	34.10%
Placer		404,739	272,471	67.32%	6,440	1.59%	2,010	0.50%	34,776	8.59%	967	0.24%	2,091	0.52%	25,356	6.26%	60,628	14.98%
Plumas		19,790	15,999	80.84%	102	0.52%	382	1.93%	145	0.73%	40	0.20%	114	0.58%	1,111	5.61%	1,897	9.59%
Riverside		2,418,185	788,235	32.60%	146,762	6.07%	11,960	0.49%	164,889	6.82%	6,767	0.28%	12,365	0.51%	84,912	3.51%	1,202,295	49.72%
Sacramento		1,585,055	650,271	41.03%	145,724	9.19%	7,432	0.47%	276,295	17.43%	18,011	1.14%	10,104	0.64%	102,784	6.48%	374,434	23.62%
San Benito		64,209	19,875	30.95%	479	0.75%	221	0.34%	2,189	3.41%	127	0.20%	332	0.52%	1,835	2.86%	39,241	61.11%
San Bernardino		2,181,654	566,113	25.95%	173,322	7.94%	8,412	0.39%	176,204	8.08%	6,173	0.28%	12,117	0.56%	68,400	3.14%	1,170,913	53.67%
San Diego		3,298,634	1,422,205	43.11%	145,014	4.40%	12,841	0.39%	400,589	12.14%	12,991	0.39%	18,125	0.55%	167,240	5.07%	1,119,629	33.94%
San Francisco		873,965	341,306	39.05%	45,071	5.16%	1,570	0.18%	294,220	33.66%	3,244	0.37%	6,347	0.73%	45,446	5.20%	136,761	15.65%
San Joaquin		779,233	215,530	27.66%	56,898	7.30%	3,135	0.40%	134,684	17.28%	4,977	0.64%	4,192	0.54%	34,092	4.38%	325,725	41.80%
San Luis Obispo		282,424	183,468	64.96%	4,330	1.53%	1,136	0.40%	10,001	3.54%	340	0.12%	1,614	0.57%	13,614	4.82%	67,921	24.05%
San Mateo		764,442	275,902	36.09%	14,701	1.92%	1,021	0.13%	227,783	29.80%	8,840	1.16%	5,840	0.76%	38,969	5.10%	191,386	25.04%
Santa Barbara		448,229	184,746	41.22%	6,467	1.44%	1,731	0.39%	25,378	5.66%	542	0.12%	2,378	0.53%	16,403	3.66%	210,584	46.98%
Santa Clara		1,936,259	555,708	28.70%	42,148	2.18%	3,240	0.17%	753,399	38.91%	5,945	0.31%	10,195	0.53%	78,267	4.04%	487,357	25.17%
Santa Cruz		270,861	145,551	53.74%	2,850	1.05%	853	0.31%	12,072	4.46%	277	0.10%	1,649	0.61%	13,310	4.91%	94,299	34.81%
Shasta		182,155	136,894	75.15%	1,761	0.97%	4,047	2.22%	5,839	3.21%	323	0.18%	1,037	0.57%	12,524	6.88%	19,730	10.83%
Sierra		3,236	2,615	80.81%	7	0.22%	18	0.56%	7	0.22%	1	0.03%	25	0.77%	186	5.75%	377	11.65%
Siskiyou		44,076	32,057	72.73%	471	1.07%	1,757	3.99%	866	1.96%	38	0.09%	265	0.60%	3,095	7.02%	5,527	12.54%
Solano		453,491	155,125	34.21%	60,051	13.24%	1,624	0.36%	70,953	15.65%	3,775	0.83%	2,988	0.66%	30,820	6.80%	128,155	28.26%
Sonoma		488,863	285,792	58.46%	7,125	1.46%	3,053	0.62%	22,239	4.55%	1,708	0.35%	2,909	0.60%	24,599	5.03%	141,438	28.93%
Stanislaus		552,878	207,908	37.60%	14,302	2.59%	2,621	0.47%	33,169	6.00%	3,713	0.67%	2,734	0.49%	22,453	4.06%	265,978	48.11%
Sutter		99,633	41,366	41.52%	1,774	1.78%	862	0.87%	18,014	18.08%	279	0.28%	611	0.61%	5,159	5.18%	31,568	31.68%
Tehama		65,829	41,340	62.80%	391	0.59%	1,167	1.77%	985	1.50%	96	0.15%	324	0.49%	3,588	5.45%	17,938	27.25%
Trinity		16,112	11,374	70.59%	66	0.41%	416	2.58%	2,212	13.73%	24	0.15%	106	0.66%	977	6.06%	937	5.82%
Tulare		473,117	125,022	26.43%	5,332	1.13%	3,458	0.73%	15,997	3.38%	511	0.11%	2,132	0.45%	10,770	2.28%	309,895	65.50%
Tuolumne		55,620	42,254	75.97%	989	1.78%	784	1.41%	770	1.38%	110	0.20%	313	0.56%	3,276	5.89%	7,124	12.81%
Ventura		843,843	360,850	42.76%	13,704	1.62%	2,020	0.24%	63,852	7.57%	1,415	0.17%	4,451	0.53%	32,866	3.89%	365,285	43.29%
Yolo		216,403	93,911	43.40%	5,722	2.64%	948	0.44%	29,872	13.80%	1,079	0.50%	1,278	0.59%	11,893	5.50%	71,700	33.13%
Yuba		81,575	41,750	51.18%	2,831	3.47%	1,034	1.27%	5,583	6.84%	372	0.46%	459	0.56%	6,026	7.39%	23,520	28.83%

== Defunct counties ==
- Branciforte County was the original name of Santa Cruz County in 1850. The reference was to the 1797 town of Branciforte.
- Klamath County was created in 1851 from the northern half of Trinity County. Part of the county's territory went to Del Norte County in 1857, and in 1874 the remainder was divided between Humboldt and Siskiyou counties.
- Pautah County, California was created in 1852 out of territory which, the state of California assumed, was to be ceded to it by the United States Congress from territory in what is now the state of Nevada. When the cession never occurred, the California State Legislature officially abolished the never-organized county in 1859.
- Buena Vista County was created in 1855 by the California State Legislature out of the southeastern territory of Tulare County on the west of the Sierra Nevada but was never officially organized. The south of Tulare County was later organized as Kern County in 1866, with additions from Los Angeles and San Bernardino counties.
- Coso County was created in 1864 by the California State Legislature out of territory of Mono County and Tulare County on the east slope of the Sierra Nevada but was never officially organized. The region was later organized in 1866 as Inyo County with additions from Los Angeles and San Bernardino counties.
- Roop County, Nevada encompassed much of Lassen County, including the Honey Lake Valley and the community of Susanville, California; ambiguous organic legislation of Nevada Territory led to confusion about the geographic extent of Nevada's western border. This was later clarified, with the portions of Roop County in California being assigned to Lassen County; the remaining, sparsely populated portions of Roop County were eventually combined with Washoe County, Nevada.

== Proposed counties ==
- Mojave County, proposed in 1988 that would have split the northern and eastern 90% of San Bernardino County
- Cahuilla County, proposed in the 1980s by the residents of eastern Riverside County
- Corona County, proposed in 2002 by residents of Corona and surrounding communities in Riverside County
- Desert County, proposed in 1961 by Harry Oliver to split the eastern portion of Riverside County
- High Desert County, proposed in the 1970s, 80s, and 90s to split from portions of Los Angeles, Kern and San Bernardino counties
- Los Padres County, proposed in 1978 to split the northern portion of Santa Barbara County
- Mission County, proposed in 2006 to split the northern portion of Santa Barbara County
- Sequoia County, proposed in the 1990s, split from parts of southern Humboldt and Northern Mendocino counties

== See also ==
- List of municipalities in California
