= China Lake, California =

China Lake, California may refer to:

- Naval Air Weapons Station China Lake, airborne weapons testing and training range operated by the United States Navy
- China Lake, Kern County, California
- China Lake Acres, California, census-designated place (CDP) in Kern County, California, United States
