= Skykomish County, Washington =

Proposed county in Washington State

Coordinates: 47°39′35.3″N 121°35′2.8″W

Proposed Skykomish County boundary in relation to existing counties, as defined in ESHB 1660 (1997)

Skykomish County was a county proposed to be carved out of Snohomish and King Counties in Washington state, United States. The name comes from the Skykomish River, which flows through the proposed county's boundaries.

== Description ==
The county would have included all land in Snohomish County east of Snohomish, Washington, as well as the northeast corner of King County including Skykomish, Washington and the portion of U.S. Route 2 that passes through that county. The southern portion of state legislative district 39, existing within Snohomish and King Counties, also includes these areas. The largest city in the county would have been Monroe, Washington.

Proponents of the new county began collecting signatures as early as 1993 to send the proposal to the state legislature. The Skykomish movement worked in concert with other county proposals, such as those to create Cedar, Freedom and Pioneer counties.

In 1997, State Representative John Koster proposed House Bill 1660, which provided for the process to create Skykomish County pending a ballot question for the affected area. The proposal set forth that the existing superior court of Snohomish County would also serve Skykomish County. Opponents of the bill (and the new county) attempted to amend the bill to require a vote from the entirety of the counties affected (Snohomish and King Counties).

In 1998, the state Supreme Court ruled that signatures from half the registered voters of the affected area are required to propose a new county, shelving many county secession movements in the state. Prior to the ruling, Washington county secession movements had interpreted the law to require signatures from only half of those who voted in the most recent election. Arguing that voter registration rolls are always out of date, Skykomish County movement leaders attacked the court's ruling as creating an "unreachable standard".

Koster also submitted bills to create Freedom County, Washington and Pioneer County, Washington, but these were not voted on before the 1997 legislative session ended.

== See also ==
- List of counties in Washington
