= Nebo Center, California =

- Neighborhood of Barstow; Former census-designated place
- Location in San Bernardino County and the state of California
- Coordinates: 34°52′15″N 116°57′3″W
- Country: United States
- State: California
- County: San Bernardino
- City: Barstow

Area
  - Total: 2.5 sq mi (6.6 km^{2})
  - Land: 2.5 sq mi (6.6 km^{2})
  - Water: 0 sq mi (0 km^{2})

Population (2000)
  - Total: 1,174
  - Density: 461/sq mi (177.9/km^{2})
- Time zone: UTC-8 (PST)
  - Summer (DST): UTC-7 (PDT)
- ZIP code: 92311
- Area codes: 442/760
- FIPS code: 06-50706

Nebo Center is a neighborhood and former census-designated place (CDP) in Barstow, San Bernardino County, California, United States. The population was 1,174 at the 2000 census. The City of Barstow annexed Nebo Center in 2001. The United States Marine Corps Logistics Base Barstow is located at Nebo Center.

== Geography ==
Nebo Center is located at 34°52′15″N 116°57′03″W.

According to the United States Census Bureau, the CDP has a total area of 2.6 square miles (6.7 km^{2}). 2.5 square miles (6.5 km^{2}) of it is land and 0.04 square miles (0.10 km^{2}) of it (0.78%) is water.

== Demographics ==
As of the census of 2000, there were 1,174 people, 349 households, and 325 families residing in the CDP. The population density was 460.5 inhabitants per square mile (177.8/km^{2}). There were 396 housing units at an average density of 155.3 per square mile (60.0/km^{2}). The racial makeup of the CDP was 60.6% White, 16.3% African American, 1.3% Native American, 3.2% Asian, 1.2% Pacific Islander, 13.0% from other races, and 4.5% from two or more races. Hispanic or Latino of any race were 21.1% of the population.

There were 349 households, out of which 61.6% had children under the age of 18 living with them, 88.0% were married couples living together, 3.7% had a female householder with no husband present, and 6.6% were non-families. 6.3% of all households were made up of individuals, and none had someone living alone who was 65 years of age or older. The average household size was 3.11 and the average family size was 3.22.

In the CDP, the population was spread out, with 34.2% under the age of 18, 25.4% from 18 to 24, 37.2% from 25 to 44, 3.0% from 45 to 64, and 0.2% who were 65 years of age or older. The median age was 23 years. For every 100 females, there were 121.1 males. For every 100 females age 18 and over, there were 131.8 males.

The median income for a household in the CDP was $39,028, and the median income for a family was $34,531. Males had a median income of $23,586 versus $25,903 for females. The per capita income for the CDP was $13,671. About 3.5% of families and 3.2% of the population were below the poverty line, including 3.0% of those under age 18 and none of those age 65 or over.

== Politics ==
In the state legislature, Nebo Center is in the 16th senatorial district, represented by Democrat Melissa Hurtado, and in the 33rd Assembly district, represented by Republican Alexandra Macedo.

In the United States House of Representatives, Nebo Center is in California's 8th congressional district, represented by Democrat John Garamendi.
