= Atomic Train =

1999 American television miniseries

- Theatrical release poster
- Genre: Disaster; Thriller; Action
- Written by: Jeff Fazio
- Directed by: David Jackson; Dick Lowry
- Starring: Rob Lowe; Kristin Davis; Esai Morales; John Finn; Mena Suvari
- Theme music composer: Lee Holdridge
- Countries of origin: United States; Canada
- Original language: English
- No. of episodes: 2

Production
- Running time: 168 minutes
- Production companies: Dennis Hammer Productions; NBC Studios

Original release
- Network: NBC
- Release: May 16 – May 17, 1999

Atomic Train is a 1999 American made-for-television disaster-action-thriller miniseries about an accidental nuclear explosion destroying the city of Denver, Colorado. It was originally broadcast on NBC in two parts on May 16 and 17, 1999.

== Plot ==
In Stillwater, Utah, Bradshaw Disposal Services is transporting a Russian nuclear bomb slated to be decommissioned. An employee, John Henry Bradshaw, decides to cut operating costs by concealing it in a freight train laden with biomedical and flammable chemicals bound for Denver. The train loses all brakes when its air hoses split apart, becoming a high-speed runaway. The lead engineer, Wally Phister, notifies rail dispatchers Ed Brown & Christina Roselli of the emergency and unsuccessfully attempts to re-connect the brake hoses but crushes his hand. Ed & Christina plans to set up a portable derailer ahead of the runaway at Silver Gorge. John Seger, a National Transportation Safety Board investigator trying to bond with his stepson, Chance, is also notified of the situation and boards the chasing locomotive–operated by Ray–via a Park Ranger helicopter.

Ed and Christina abort the planned derailment when another employee from Bradshaw Disposal Systems warns them about a nuclear bomb. This allows John and Ray to catch up and couple the runaway to engage its brakes, slowing it down. However, the couplers gave way, forcing John to board the train. Brakeman Tucker Ames is killed when he is thrown off the caboose and onto the tracks. Lieutenant Colonel Tom Levy from NEST contacts John and tasks him to locate the bomb and identify the payload. John eventually locates the bomb inside a boxcar, and relays the information to Denver Railroad Control, finally confirming the threat. In the state of bedlam across the city, Noris "Mac" Mackenzie, a police officer and an ex-husband of John Seger's wife Megan Seger, responds to a hostage situation while Beau Randall, another police officer, alongside his wife, leads a large civilian convoy using the firetruck to evacuate the trapped civilians out of Denver.

John attempts to stop the train from reaching Jackson Summit – the final mountain peak before Denver – by jamming the electrical lock using a crowbar. His efforts are successful but short-lived. Against Brown's orders, Ray speeds forward in an attempt to rescue the crew but realizes too late of the runaway's slowing, and slams into the caboose, disengaging the brakes. Realizing there is no way to stop it, John convinces Wally to abandon the train. Train conductor Stan Atkins – the last man on the crew – attempts to re-connect the air hoses but falls off and dies. Now completely unmanned, the train speeds down the mountain and careens off the track at Millers Bend, the final derailment site set up near Denver. Although the bomb does not detonate, the chemicals on the wrecked train are set ablaze.

John, working with NEST, attempts to extract the bomb but are forced back when the chemicals combust around them. NEST Commander Reuben Castillo volunteers to disarm the bomb alone. However, liquid metallic sodium starts to leak, and Tom Levy attempts to abort bombing the site with water, as it would ignite the sodium. One of the helicopter crew misinterprets the order and dumps water onto the wreck, triggering a nuclear explosion and releasing an electromagnetic pulse that wipes out all electricity in Denver and sending a shockwave that tears through part of the city. Thousands are killed and injured, but John and his family survive.

With Denver in ruins, John attempts to get his family out of the city ahead of the fallout, but the EMP renders almost every vehicle immobile. Mac decides to take their children, Chance and Grace through the old, abandoned coal mines for a quicker route out of Denver. John and Megan manage to hitch themselves and an injured Danny aboard a bus bound for Eminence, Kansas where FEMA had set up an emergency shelter there. However, John elects to stay behind and decide to follow Mac and their kids, learning from Grace that Mac is paralyzed in an accident and Chance is left hanging precariously over the deep mining pit. Mac sacrifices his life to pull Chance to safety, falling to his death.

John, Chance, and Grace Seger finally reunites with Megan and Danny at a FEMA refugee camp in Eminence.

== Cast ==
- Rob Lowe as John Seger, an NTSB investigator, Megan's second husband
- Kristin Davis as Megan Seger, John Seger’s wife and mother of Chance
- Esai Morales as Noris "Mac" MacKenzie, Chance's biological father, Megan's ex-husband, and police officer of the Denver Police Department
- Sean Smith as Chance MacKenzie, son of Megan and Mac, and Grace's step-brother.
- Mena Suvari as Grace Seger, John Seger's daughter, Chance's step-sister and Megan's step-daughter.
- John Finn as Wally Phister, the engineer of the runaway train.
- Zack Ward as Stan Atkins, the conductor of the runaway train.
- Eric Keenleyside as Tucker Ames, the caboose brakeman of the runaway train.
- Anthony Harrison as Al Discus, the Bradshaw Employee of the runaway train.
- Colin Lawrence as Steve Monroe, the Bradshaw Employee of the runaway train.
- Eric Johnson as Danny, Grace's boyfriend
- Edward Herrmann as President Fellwick
- Don S. Davis as General Harlan Ford
- Norman Armour as Savella
- Blu Mankuma as NEST Commander Rueben Castillo
- Michael Tomlison as NEST Lt. Colonel Tom Levy
- Jane Perry as Kelly Marx, KNFS-News TV reporter
- Erik King as Beau Randall, police officer of the Denver Police Department and Jane's husband
- Karen Holness as Jane Randall, Beau Randall's wife
- Henry Lubatti as John Henry Bradshaw of “Bradshaw Disposal Systems”
- Chris Ellis as Ed Brown, a “Denver Railroad Control” Employee
- Yanna McIntosh as Christina Roselli, another "Denver Railroad Control" Employee

== Production ==
The release poster features FM C-liners, of which one remains, Canadian Pacific 4104, at Nelson, British Columbia.

Some of the scenes within the opening film's montage features actual newsreel images of rail disasters such as the Big Bayou Canot rail accident in 1993 and the train collision in Maryland in 1996. There is also footage from other films such as the trestle collapsing in the 1995 film Under Siege 2: Dark Territory.

The actual film uses all Canadian railroad equipment, including the MLW M-420. The two locomotives that attempt to couple to the runaway train are in the paint scheme of BC Rail, which has since been folded into Canadian National.

The two switchers used at the beginning of the movie were most likely Montana Rail Link SW9 locomotives. Repainted to sport a white Texas silhouette.

The derailment sequence at the fictional Millers Bend Lumber Yard, was filmed using 1/6 scale miniature trains for the derailment sequence. This scene involved the film crew bring onboard both Academy Award-winning, miniature effects creator, Gene Warren, and pyrotechnics specialist, Joe Viskocil, to create the scene, which was the best and biggest action moments of the movie. The aftermath of the train wreck used full-scale replicas of the train cars that were erected out of wood, steel and foam.

The runaway freight train's locomotives and freight cars used in the movie, were re-lettered for the fictional railroad company Westrail. This is the third movie made in the late 90's to use trains re-lettered Westrail, since two other movies made the year before Evasive Action and Hijack featured trains and railroad equipment re-lettered for that fictional railroad company of the same name as well. The boxcar carrying the bomb is out-of-date and was illegal to use by railroads after 1995. It had solid-bearing trucks rather than roller-bearing trucks. Railroad cars with the older trucks disappeared long before 1999.

Some scenes showing the aftermath of the train crash, were also used in the beginning of the 2003 movie Death Train, which also featured some deleted scenes of the wreckage of as Bryan Genesse’ character, Ryan, makes his way out of the derailed train, before it explodes. That movie however, does not reference or mention of a nuclear bomb involved. In this movie, the explosion sequence is the result of the dangerous cargo on the train.

=== Location ===
The movie was filmed in the mountains and city area of Vancouver, British Columbia in 1998. Several film locations include: Britannia Beach, the mainline of the British Columbia Railroad, North Vancouver, Clinton and Lillooet. The city of Vancouver was used as the stand-in Denver, Colorado since the film was not shown on the Colorado NBC affiliate, KUSA-9, because of the Columbine shootings.

== Awards ==
- Won the Golden Reel Award (2000) for "Best Sound Editing - Television Mini-Series - Effects and Foley"
- Nominated for Golden Reel Award (2000) for "Best Sound Editing - Television Mini-Series - Dialogue and ADR"

== Home media release ==
Trimark Home Video (under the label NBC Home Video) released the film in DVD and VHS on September 21, 1999.

== See also ==
- List of disaster films
- Unstoppable (2010 film)
