= List of California desert topics =

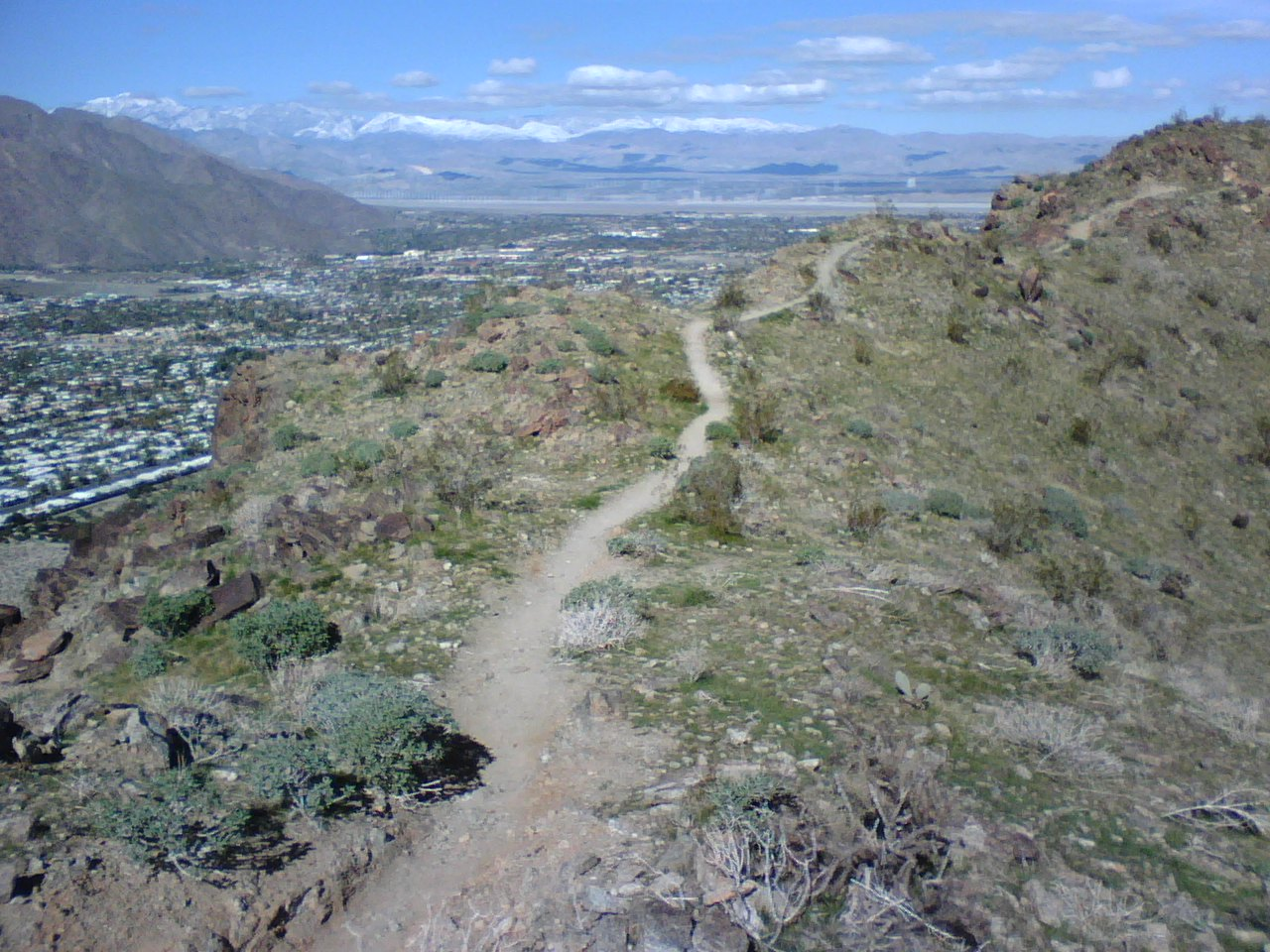
A hiking trail above Palm Springs

== Deserts ==
- Mojave Desert (High Desert)
- Sonoran Desert
  - Colorado Desert (Low Desert)
  - Yuha Desert
  - See also: Lower Colorado River Valley Deserts
- Great Basin Desert

=== Valleys ===
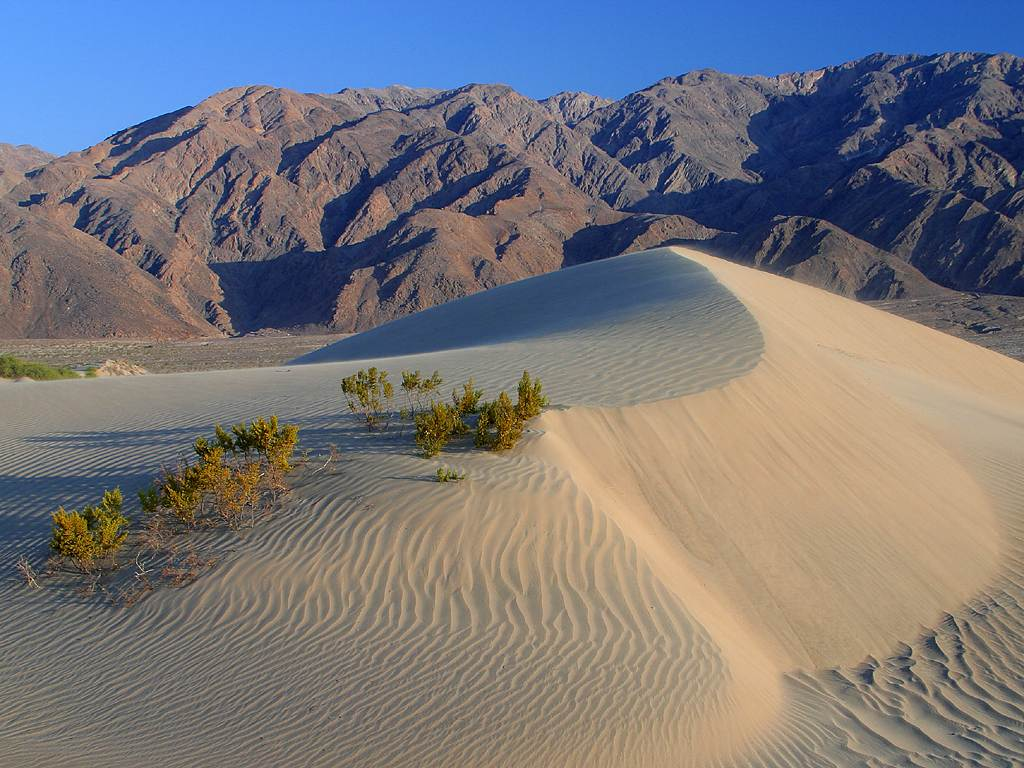
Sand dunes in Death Valley

Desert Valleys include the:

- Owens Valley
- Deep Springs Valley
- Eureka Valley
- Saline Valley
- Death Valley
- Panamint Valley
- Indian Wells Valley
- Fremont Valley
- Antelope Valley
- Victor Valley
- Lucerne Valley
- Lanfair Valley
- Coachella Valley
- Imperial Valley
- Lower Colorado River Valley
- Death Valley

== Natural history ==
- Category: Flora of the California desert regions
- Category: Fauna of the Mojave Desert
- Category: Fauna of the Colorado Desert
- Category: Flora of the Sonoran Deserts
- Wildflower superbloom

== Parks, Nature Preserves, and Wilderness Areas ==
The deserts contain many national, state, county, municipal, and conservation foundation managed parks, recreation and scenic areas, wildlife preserves and nature reserves, and wilderness areas.

=== Parks ===
- Mojave National Preserve (National Park Service)
- Death Valley National Park
- Joshua Tree National Park
- Santa Rosa and San Jacinto Mountains National Monument
- Anza-Borrego Desert State Park
- Mount San Jacinto State Park
- Red Rock Canyon State Park
- Mojave Narrows Park

=== Recreation areas ===
- Algodones Dunes - Imperial Sand Dunes Recreation Area
- Sonny Bono Salton Sea National Wildlife Refuge

=== Unique features and landmarks ===
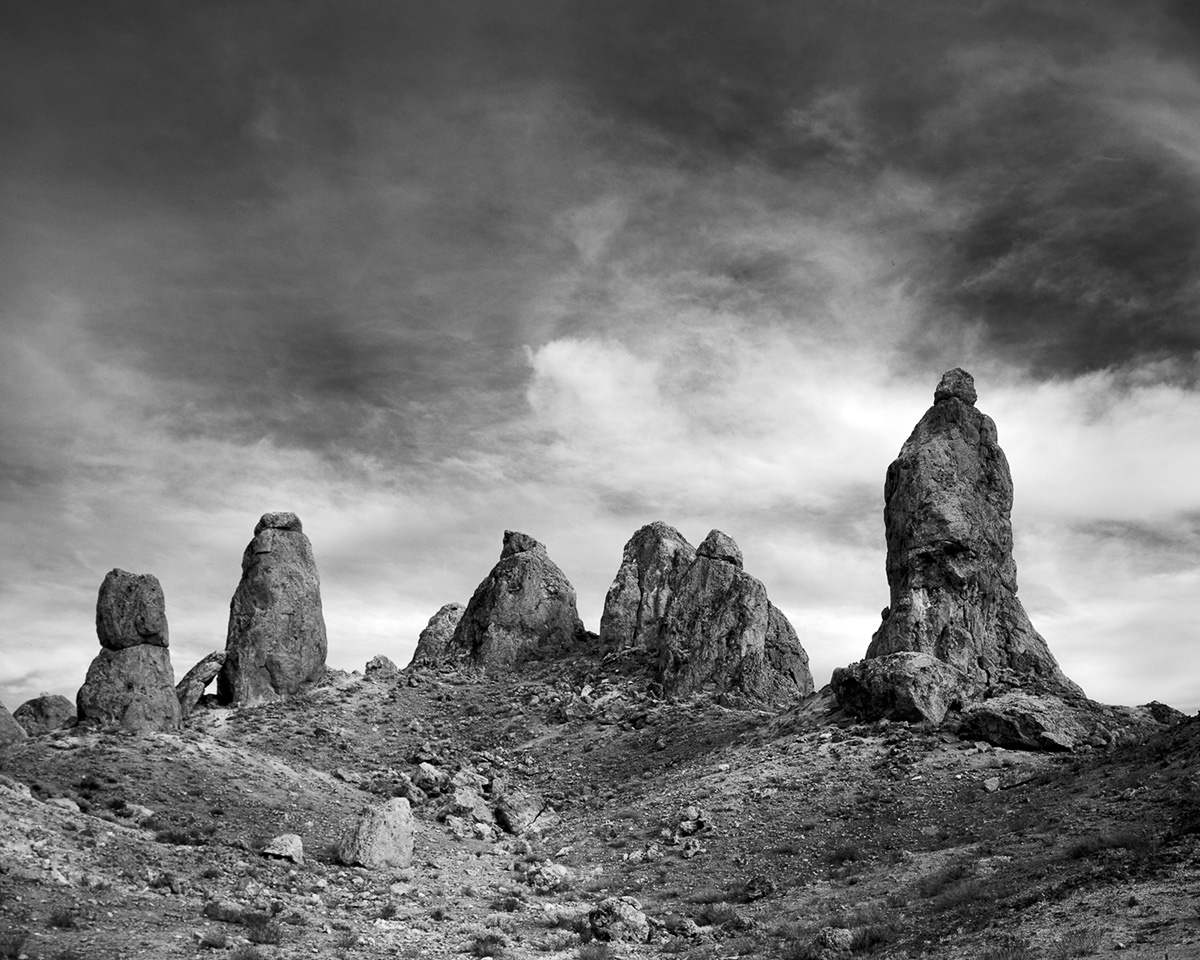
Trona pinnacles

- Devils Punchbowl County Park, Littlerock, California
- Trona Pinnacles National Natural Landmark
- Mitchell Caverns National Preserve
- Mecca Hills National Preserve
- Saddleback Butte State Park. Lake Los Angeles, California
- Antelope Valley California Poppy Reserve
- Rainbow Basin National Natural Landmark, Barstow, California
- Amboy Crater National Natural Landmark, Amboy, California
- Cima volcanic field

=== Wildlife and nature preserves ===
- Big Morongo Canyon Preserve
- Imperial National Wildlife Refuge
- Cibola National Wildlife Refuge
- Arthur B. Ripley Desert Woodland State Park

== History and Art Museums ==
- Palm Springs Desert Museum, Palm Springs, California
- Moorten Botanical Garden and Cactarium, Palm Springs, California
- Kelso Depot, Restaurant and Employees Hotel
- Harvey House Railroad Depot Casa del Desierto, Barstow, California
- Western America Railroad Museum, Barstow, California
- El Garces Hotel, Needles, California
- Maturango Museum, Ridgecrest, California
- Mojave Desert Heritage & Cultural Center, old Goffs schoolhouse and depot, Goffs, California
- California Route 66 Museum, Victorville, California
- Antelope Valley Indian Museum State Historic Park, Palmdale, California
- Eastern California Museum, Owens Valley, Independence, California
- Cabot's Pueblo Museum, Desert Hot Springs, California

== Population centers ==
=== Native American Reservations ===
- Agua Caliente Band of Cahuilla Indians, Palm Springs, California
- Colorado River Indian Reservation
- Morongo Band of Cahuilla Mission Indians
- Ewiiaapaayp Band of Kumeyaay Indians
- Los Coyotes Band of Cahuilla and Cupeno Indians
- Torres-Martinez Desert Cahuilla Indians
- Augustine Band of Cahuilla Indians
- Fort Yuma Indian Reservation
- Paiute-Shoshone Indians of the Lone Pine Community of the Lone Pine Reservation
- Timbisha Indian Village, Furnace Creek, California

=== Cities and Settlements ===
- Adelanto
- Amboy
- Apple Valley
- Baker
- Barstow
- Big Bear Lake
- Blythe
- Brawley
- Boron
- Borrego Springs
- Calexico
- California City
- Calipatria
- Cantil
- Cathedral City
- China Lake
- Coachella,
- Daggett
- Darwin
- Deep Springs
- Desert Center
- Desert Hot Springs
- El Centro
- Essex
- Fort Irwin
- Furnace Creek
- Heber
- Hinkley
- Holtville
- Homewood Canyon-Valley Wells
- Imperial, Indian Wells
- Indio
- Inyokern
- Johannesburg
- Joshua Tree
- Keeler
- Kelso
- La Quinta
- Lancaster
- Landers
- Lone Pine
- Mojave
- Montclair
- Morongo Valley
- Needles
- Newberry Springs
- Niland
- Ocotillo
- Olancha
- Palmdale
- Palm Desert
- Palm Springs
- Pearsonville,
- Rancho Mirage
- Randsburg
- Ridgecrest
- Rosamond
- Salton City
- Seeley
- Shoshone
- Tecopa
- Trona
- Twentynine Palms
- Victorville
- Westmorland
- Yermo
- Yucca Valley

=== Military reservations ===
- Edwards Air Force Base
- China Lake Naval Weapons Center
- Fort Irwin Military Reservation
- Twentynine Palms Marine Corps Base
- Chocolate Mountain Aerial Gunnery Range

== Other sights ==
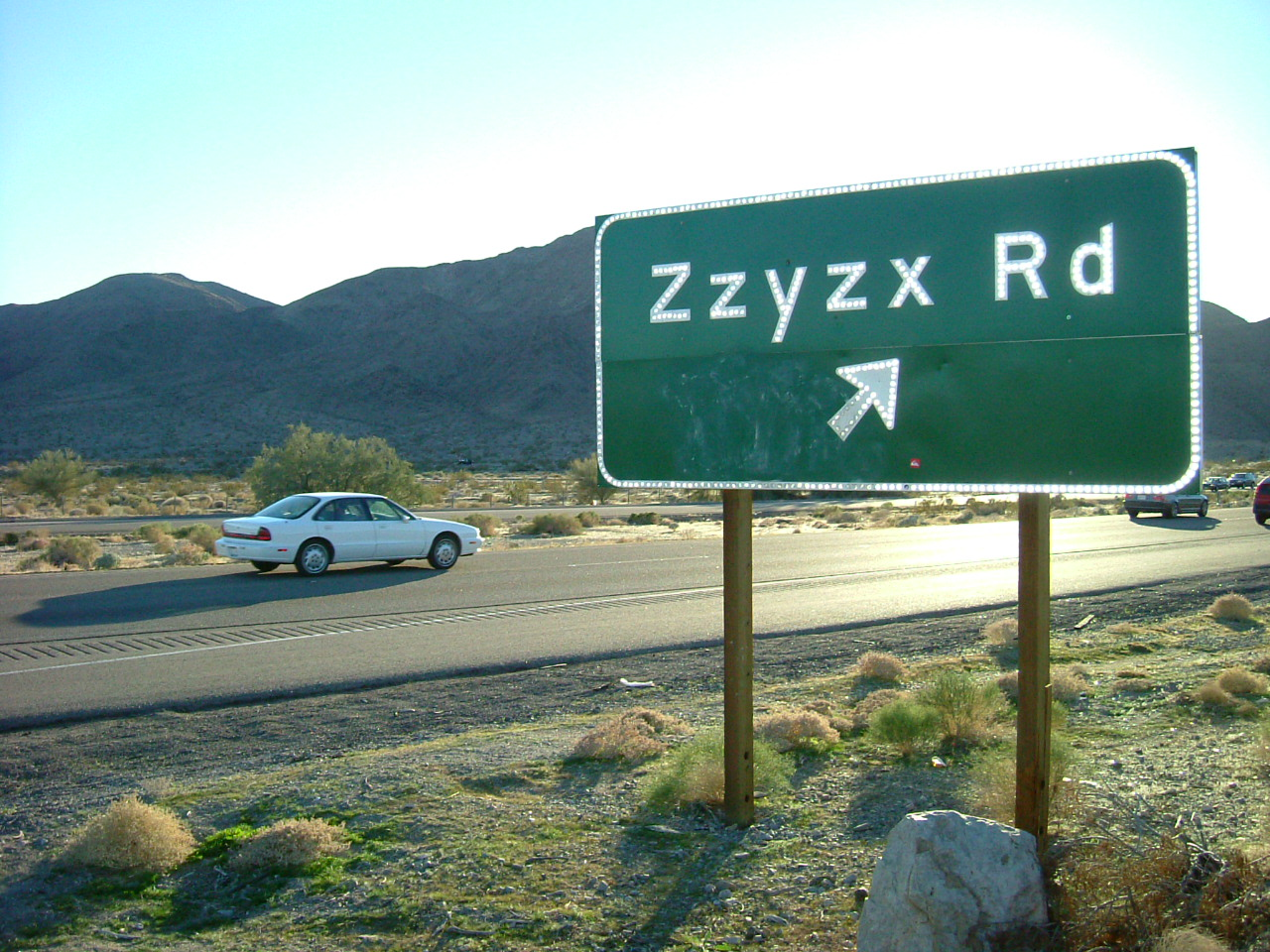
Zzyzx Road off ramp

- Blythe Intaglios
- Bradshaw Trail
- Calico Ghost Town
- Coso Rock Art District petroglyphs
- Mojave Road
- Pioneertown
- U.S. Route 66
- Trona Pinnacles
- Wildflower superbloom
- Zzyzx
