= Eminence, Kansas =

Ghost town in Finney County, Kansas

- Ghost town
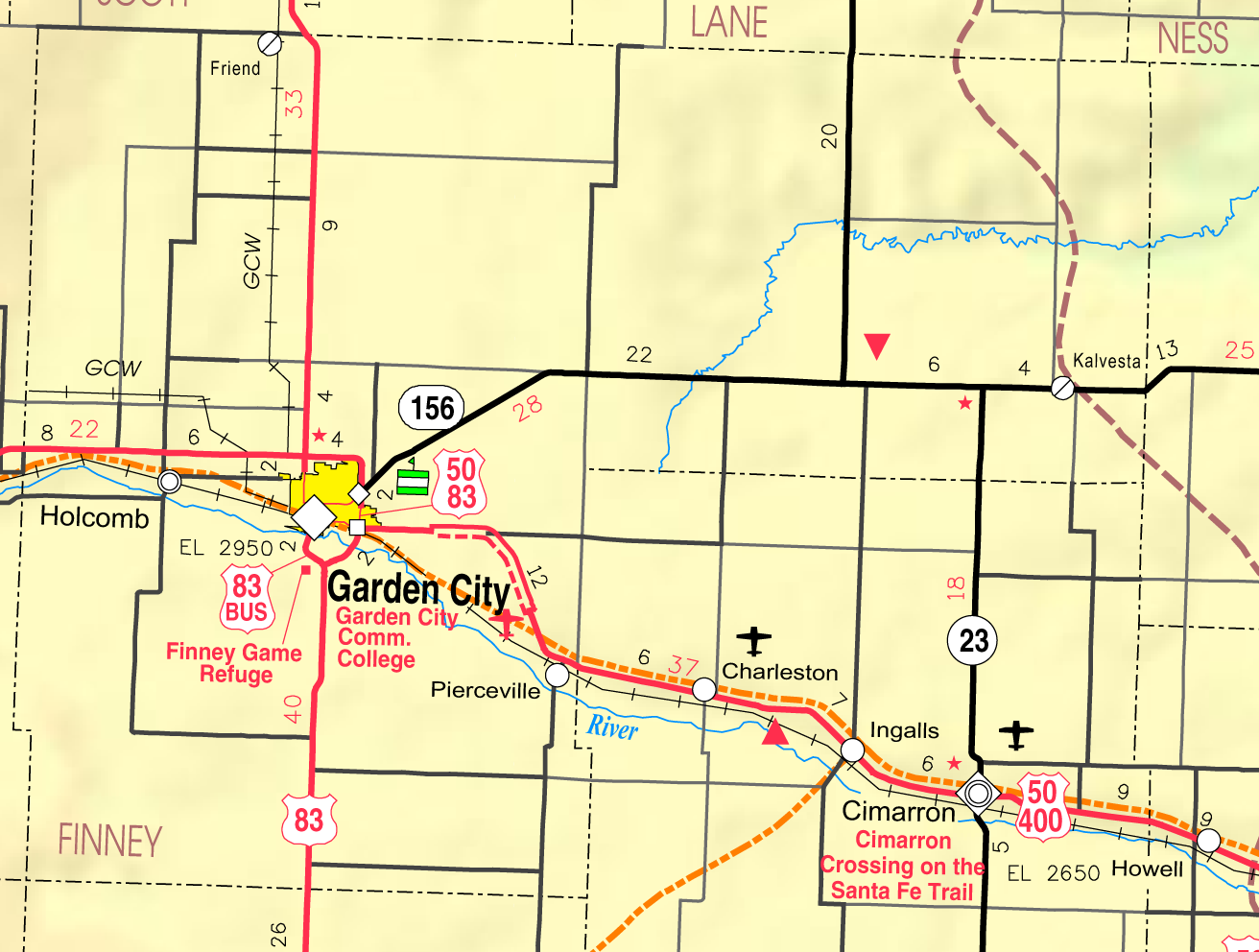
- KDOT map of Finney County (legend)

- Location within the state of Kansas
- Coordinates: 38°08′50″N 100°30′37″W
- Country: United States
- State: Kansas
- County: Finney
- Founded: 1887
- Elevation: 2,608 ft (795 m)

Population
  - Total: 0
- Time zone: UTC-6 (CST)
  - Summer (DST): UTC-5 (CDT)
- Area code: 620
- GNIS ID: 485330

Eminence is a ghost town in Finney County, Kansas, United States.

== History ==
Eminence was founded in 1887. It was originally called Creola but was changed to Eminence when the Post Office Department informed the founders there was already a town with that name in Kansas. The town's early history was defined by its rivalry with Ravanna for the status of Garfield County seat. Ravanna won the election by 35 votes. Eminence immediately challenged the results, claiming a construction crew working on Ravanna's new $10,000 courthouse (nicknamed the "Great White Elephant") had illegally cast 60 votes using names of dead men who were not Ravanna residents. The Kansas Supreme Court agreed, and in 1889 the county seat was transferred to Eminence. This victory, however, was short-lived as a surveyor hired by Ravanna found that Garfield County had been illegally organized and was below the minimum size for a county defined in the Kansas Constitution, and the entire county was subsequently disincorporated and annexed by neighboring Finney County.

A post office was opened in Eminence in June 1887, and remained in operation until it was discontinued in 1942.

== In popular culture ==
Eminence is the Federal Emergency Management Agency refugee center established to take evacuees from Denver, Colorado as the event of an explosion at a train derailment and the subsequent detonation of a smuggled Russian nuclear weapon which was in the derailment wreckage in the 1999 TV movie Atomic Train at Miller's Bend, Colorado.
