= Garfield Township, Finney County, Kansas =

Garfield Township
- Township
- Location within Finney County

- Location within the state of Kansas
- Coordinates: 38°07′54″N 100°26′33″W
- Country: United States
- State: Kansas
- County: Finney

Area
  - Total: 431.14 sq mi (1,116.65 km^{2})
  - Land: 430.75 sq mi (1,115.64 km^{2})
  - Water: 0.39 sq mi (1.01 km^{2}) 0.09%
- Elevation: 2,641 ft (805 m)

Population (2020)
  - Total: 345
  - Density: 0.801/sq mi (0.309/km^{2})
- Time zone: UTC-6 (CST)
  - Summer (DST): UTC-5 (CDT)
- FIPS code: 20-25600
- GNIS ID: 485251

Garfield Township is a township in Finney County, Kansas, United States. As of the 2020 census, its population was 345.

== History ==
Presidential Elections Results
Year	Republican	Democratic	Third Parties
1892	59.7% 102		40.4% 69
1888	62.2% 225	35.6% 129	2.2% 8

Historically the Garfield Township was organized as Garfield County in 1887. In 1893, the Kansas Supreme Court ruled that the county was illegally organized for not having the required 432 square miles (1,120 km^{2}) of area, and the county was annexed to Finney County, forming the current township. The population at the 1890 census was 881.

Garfield County was created by an act of the Kansas state legislature on March 23, 1887. It consisted of what is now the eastern portion of Finney County north of Gray County:

That the county of Garfield is hereby created, bounded as follows: Commencing where the north line of township twenty-one south intersects the east line of range twenty-seven west; thence south along range line until its intersection with north line of township twenty-four south; thence west along township line to wear it intersects the east line of range thirty-one west; thence north along range line to where it intersects the north line of township twenty-one south; thence east to the place of beginning.

The county was named after President James A. Garfield, who had been assassinated six years earlier.

The first meeting of the county commissioners was held at Ravanna on July 22, 1887.

The county seat was to be located at a town near the center of the county which originally was called Creola; the name was changed to Eminence when the Post Office Department informed the founders there was already a post office in Kansas called Creola.

The brief history of the county was marked by a bitter and sometimes violent rivalry between Ravanna and Eminence, over which would serve as county seat. While some reports says that Bat Masterson and twenty deputies from Dodge City were sent to the county to keep the peace during the November 1887 election, Masterson at the time denied press reports that he was involved in the Garfield County election. Ravanna won the election by just 35 votes. Eminence immediately challenged the results, claiming a construction crew working on Ravanna's new $10,000 courthouse (nicknamed the "Great White Elephant") had illegally cast 60 votes using names of dead men who were not Ravanna residents. The Kansas Supreme Court agreed the county seat election was tainted and threw out the results. Reports of impending violence in Garfield County in August 1889 caused the Kansas Adjutant General to visit Eminence and Ravanna where he found armed men preparing to take action over the county seat. The Adjutant General was able to diffuse the situation. The county seat was transferred to Eminence in October 1889.

In 1881, Rabbi Isaac Mayer Wise, president of Hebrew Union College in Cincinnati, organized a settlement called Beersheba, east of Ravanna. Twenty-eight Jewish families settled on Pawnee Creek in sod houses. The colony lasted until the late 1880s when most of the residents left Kansas.

A constitutional challenge to the creation of Garfield County was brought to the Kansas Supreme Court as part of a habeas corpus petition but the justices ruled the petitioner had no standing to question the creation of the county. Ravanna hired surveyors who determined that the county had less than the minimum of 432 square miles (1,120 km^{2}) required for the formation of a county under Article 9 of the Kansas State Constitution. On March 7, 1893, the Kansas Supreme Court ruled that Garfield County had been illegally organized. Four days later, the Kansas Legislature passed a law annexing Garfield County to Finney County; the law took effect March 18. This reduced the number of Kansas counties to the present 105.

The statute annexing the territory to Finney County was upheld by the Supreme Court in June 1893. By the terms of the annexation statute, Garfield Township was the legal successor of Garfield County and was responsible for the county's debts. This was upheld by the Supreme Court in 1894.

Eight newspapers were published in Garfield County: the Garfield County Call, published at Eminence from 1887 to 1893; the Sunbeam, published at Essex in 1887; the Herald, published at Kalveeta from 1887 to 1888; the Garfield County Journal, published at Loyal from 1887 to 1889; the Chieftain, published at Ravanna from 1887 to 1893; the Enquirer, published at Ravanna from 1887 to 1888; the Kansas Sod House, published at Ravanna from 1886 to 1887; and the Record, published at Ravanna from 1887 to 1889.

Both Ravanna and Eminence are now ghost towns.

== Geography ==
Garfield Township covers an area of 431.14 square miles (1,116.6 km^{2}) and contains no incorporated settlements.

According to the USGS, it contains two cemeteries: Eminence and Garfield.

Garfield Township is also a home to number of ghost towns.

== Demographics ==
The population was 345 as of the 2020 census, with 122 total housing units.

Historical population
Census	Pop.	Note	%±
1890	881		—
1900	363		−58.8%
1910	857		136.1%
1920	716		−16.5%
1930	817		14.1%
1940	539		−34.0%
1950	641		18.9%
1960	583		−9.0%
1970	479		−17.8%
1980	342		−28.6%
1990	326		−4.7%
2000	331		1.5%
2010	288		−13.0%
2020	345		19.8%
U.S. Decennial Census

== Sources ==
- Thornadale, William; Dollarhide, William (1987). Map Guide to the U.S. Federal Census, 1790-1920. Baltimore: Genealogical Publishing. p. 121.
- Article 9 of the Kansas State Constitution
- Garfield County - Kansas State Historical Society
- Kansas: A Cyclopedia of State History (1912)
