= High Desert County, California =

Proposed county in California, United States

Various proposals have been made to create a new county in California, variously called High Desert County, among other names. It would be formed from portions of Los Angeles, Kern and/or San Bernardino counties.

== History ==
Due to cultural and geographic differences between the rural and urban portions of Los Angeles, Kern and San Bernardino counties, various attempts have been made in the 1970s, 1980s, and 1990s to form a new, rural county in the high desert regions of these counties.

=== William J. Knight proposal ===
In 1998, California state senator William J. Knight proposed a plan to create a new county out of the northern half of Los Angeles and the eastern half of Kern counties. That year, Knight proposed a bill to create a panel to study whether this county should be created. Knight also introduced a bill to eliminate the signature-collecting step required to get the proposal on the ballot to allow local residents to vote on the matter. By placing the proposal on the ballot, Knight hoped that the proposal would not be blocked by legislators who wanted to keep Santa Clarita, Lancaster and Palmdale in Los Angeles County, Victor Valley in San Bernardino County, and Mojave and California City in Kern County.

In an effort to place the vote on the ballot, Knight planned to draft an amendment to the California Constitution that would change voting procedures for forming a new county, allowing only people within the boundary of the proposed area to vote on the matter. The amendment would require a two-thirds vote of the California Legislature. The legislative proposal was ultimately changed to call for "a commission to study the services received by desert residents of Los Angeles, Kern and San Bernardino counties, and to evaluate the financial feasibility of creating a new county."

=== Carl Boyer proposal ===
Beginning in the 1970s, Santa Clarita, California founder Carl Boyer argued that northern portions of the San Fernando Valley should secede from Los Angeles County. In January 2013, Boyer "again argued that Santa Clarita and other high desert semi-arid communities separate north of the San Fernando Valley secede from Los Angeles County and form our own new county. Call it High Desert County or Mountain County or Land of the Dry Rivers County -whatever- we need to secede from Los Angeles County".

== See also ==
- Mojave County, California
- List of U.S. county secession proposals#California
- Southern California
