= High Desert (California) =

Geographic area of southern California

Coordinates: 34.8°N 117.6°W

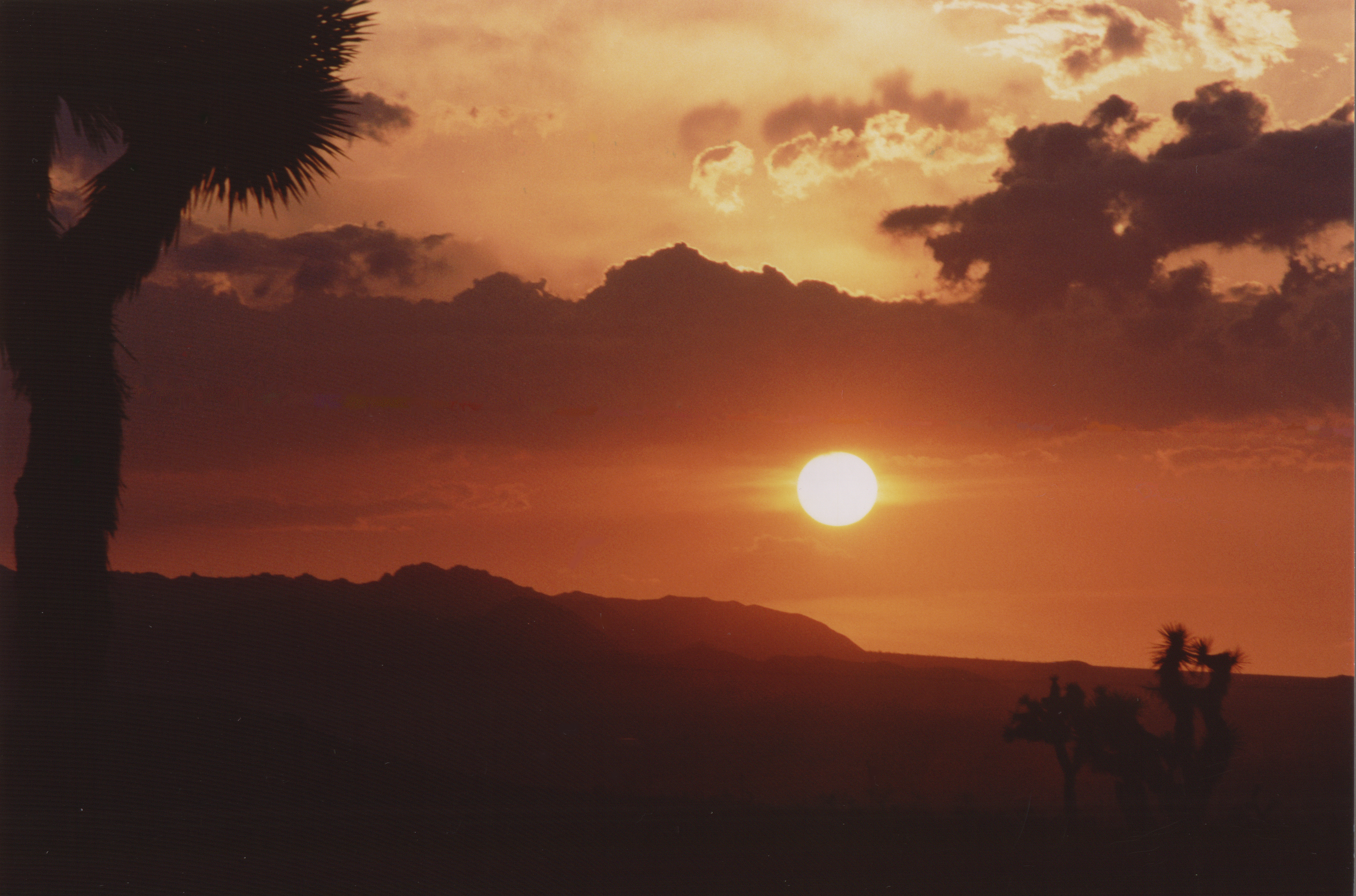
The High Desert at sunset in Johnson Valley, along California State Route 247

The High Desert is a vernacular region with non-discrete boundaries covering areas of the western Mojave Desert in Southern California. The region encompasses various terrain with elevations generally between 2,000 and 4,000 ft (610 and 1,220 m) above sea level, and is located just north of the San Gabriel, San Bernardino, and Little San Bernardino Mountains.

The term "High Desert" is commonly used by local news media, especially in weather forecasts, because of the high desert's unique and moderate weather patterns compared to its low desert neighbors. The term "High Desert" serves to differentiate it from southern California's Low Desert, which is defined by the differences in elevation, climate, animal life, and vegetation native to these regions. For instance, Palm Springs, at 500 feet (150 m) above sea level, is considered "Low Desert"; in contrast, Landers at 3,100 feet (940 m) above sea level, is considered "High Desert".

The High Desert, along with the "Mojave River Valley" and the Victor Valley, is mostly used to describe the area centered around Victorville. The region extends as far west as Lancaster, as far southwest as Palmdale, and north to the Barstow desert. "High Desert" has also been incorporated into the names of businesses and organizations in these areas. The term "High Desert" is also erroneously used to refer to the communities north and west of Joshua Tree National Park—Twentynine Palms and the Morongo Basin (Yucca Valley), which are actually in an area called the Hi-Desert. These communities are at a higher elevation than the Low Desert that encompasses the Coachella Valley and Imperial Valley in far southern California.

The area was even proposed to become a new county due to cultural, economic and geographic differences relative to the rest of the more urban region.

== Geography ==
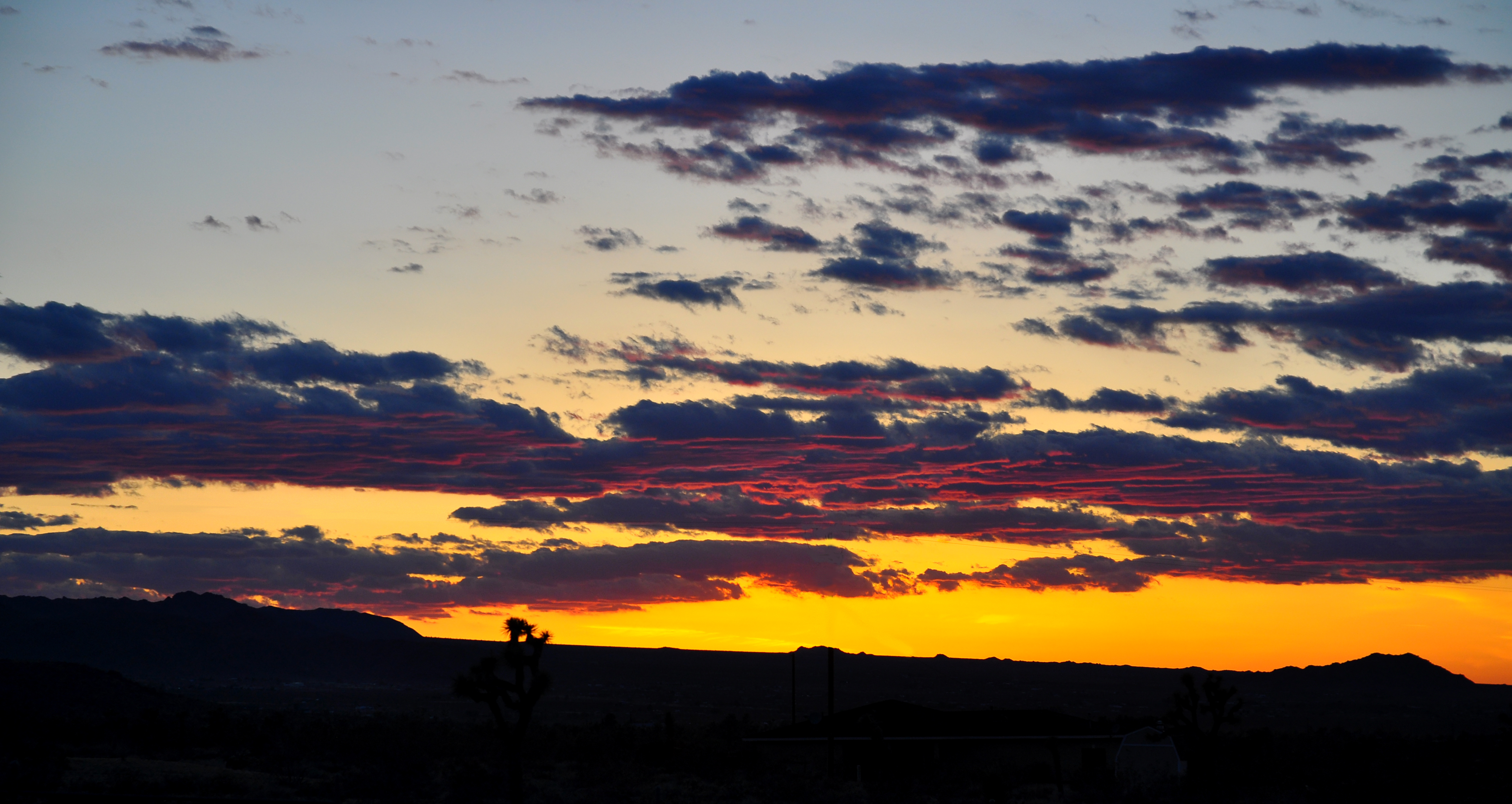
Old Woman Springs Ridge in the high desert, Johnson Valley, California

Depending on how the boundaries of the Mojave and the Colorado Desert region are defined, the High Desert either includes the entire California portion of the Mojave Desert (using a smaller geographic designation than its ecoregion) or the northern portion of the California desert (using a larger geographic designation including the ecotope area of the lower and adjacent Sonoran Desert).

The name of the region comes from its higher elevations and more northern latitude with associated climate and plant communities distinct from the Low Desert, which includes the Colorado Desert and the below-sea-level Salton Sea. The High Desert is typically windier than the Low Desert, and it averages 12 to 20 °F cooler in both the winter and summer seasons.

== Regions ==
The High Desert is often divided into the following regions, moving west to east:

- The Los Angeles County portion, containing the Antelope Valley, part of the Palmdale–Lancaster Urbanized Area, and in the Los Angeles metropolitan area. The Urbanized Area is home to 353,619 people.
- The San Bernardino County portion, containing the Victor Valley and Barstow, is the most populous region of the High Desert with an estimated 2015 population of over 385,960 residents. Major population center in area includes Victorville, Hesperia, Apple Valley, Adelanto, and Oak Hills. This region is sometimes considered part of the Inland Empire area of Southern California.
- Further east lies the Lucerne Valley and the Morongo Basin, where Yucca Valley and the Twentynine Palms Marine Base are located. All these regions are all considered to be part of Greater Los Angeles.

San Bernardino County's portion of the High Desert region contains the most land mass of the four involved counties, making up approximately 70% of the total county's area.

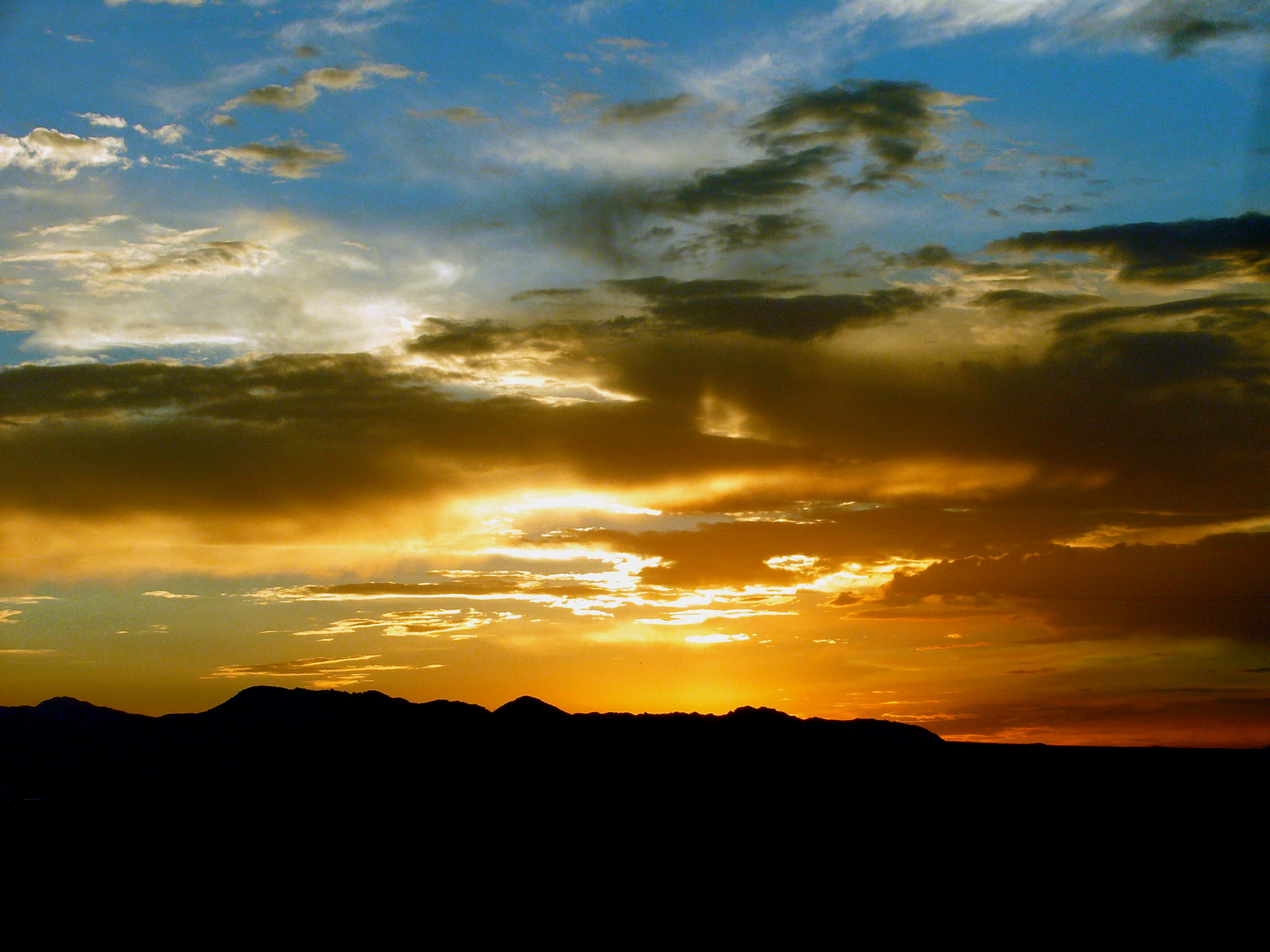
Just after sunset, Landers, California

Other parts of the greater physical region known as the "High Desert" include:

- The San Bernardino County northeastern reaches of the High Desert, where the Fort Irwin National Training Center and the Searles Valley are located, and the far eastern edge of the state where places like Needles and Earp are located along the Colorado River.
- The Kern County portion, containing part of two valleys, with the southeastern part in the Antelope Valley, including Rosamond, California City, Boron, Edwards Air Force Base, and Mojave, which are all a part of the Palmdale–Lancaster Urbanized Area, and the northeastern part being in the Indian Wells Valley, including the communities of Inyokern and Ridgecrest.
- The Inyo County portion, north of Kern County and containing the northern end of the Indian Wells Valley, Panamint Valley, and Saline Valley. This is the most sparsely populated area of the High Desert; its major communities are Lone Pine in the southern Owens Valley and Bishop in the northern.

== Cities and communities ==
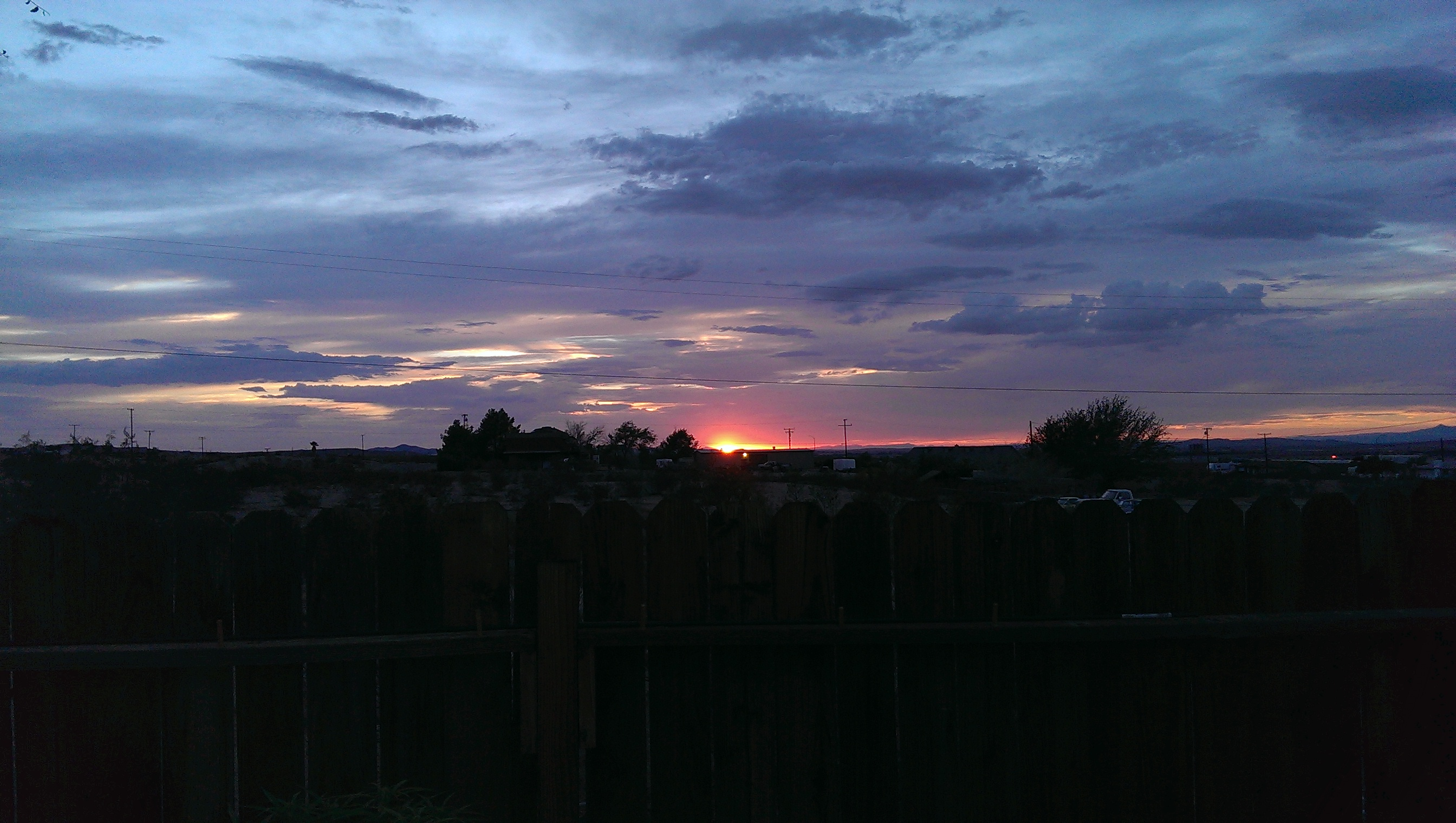
Sunset over the Mojave

The major metropolitan centers in the region are primarily centered on the cities of Lancaster and Victorville. Lancaster, the largest city in the High Desert, is located in the Antelope Valley next to Palmdale and anchors the area's Los Angeles County region with a metro area population of just over 500,000. The Victor Valley area, which includes cities and communities such as Victorville, Hesperia, Adelanto, Apple Valley, and Lucerne Valley, boasts a population around 385,000. The Barstow area, to the northeast of the Victor Valley, and the Morongo Basin near Joshua Tree National Park both have populations of around 60,000.

=== List of cities, towns, and census-designated places ===
Incorporated places are listed in bold. This list includes all places in the broadest definition of "High Desert". Population figures are most recent information available from the US Census Bureau.

- Acton (7,596)
- **Adelanto** (34,160)
- Agua Dulce (3,342)
- Antelope Acres (2,800)
- **Apple Valley** (73,508)
- **Barstow** (23,972)
- **Bishop** (3,746)
- Boron (2,253)
- Calico (12)
- **California City** (14,217)
- Cima (10)
- Daggett (200)
- Del Sur (1,750)
- Edwards (2,063)
- El Mirage (unknown)
- Elizabeth Lake (1,756)
- Essex (89)
- Fort Irwin (8,845)
- Goffs (23)
- Halloran Springs (18)
- Helendale (4,936)
- **Hesperia** (95,274)
- Hinkley (1,915)
- Hi Vista (3,003)
- Inyokern (1,099)
- Johnson Valley (2,101)
- Joshua Tree (7,414)
- Kelso (0)
- Lake Hughes (649)
- Lake Los Angeles (12,328)
- **Lancaster** (159,053)
- Landers (2,632)
- Lenwood (3,543)
- Leona Valley (1,607)
- Littlerock (1,377)
- Llano (1,201)
- Lone Pine (2,035)
- Lucerne Valley (5,811)
- Ludlow (10)
- Mojave (4,238)
- Mountain Pass (8)
- Mountain View Acres (3,130)
- Nebo Center (1,174)
- **Needles** (4,982)
- Neenach (800)
- Newberry Springs (1,280)
- Nipton (28)
- North Edwards (1,058)
- Oak Hills (8,879)
- Oro Grande (974)
- **Palmdale** (156,667)
- Pearblossom (2,435)
- Phelan (14,304)
- Piñon Hills (7,272)
- Pioneertown (350)
- Quartz Hill (10,912)
- Ragtown (0)
- Randsburg (69)
- **Ridgecrest** (28,940)
- Rosamond (18,150)
- Siberia (0)
- Spring Valley Lake (8,220)
- Sunfair (288)
- Sunfair Heights (149)
- Sun Village (11,565)
- Three Points (200)
- Trona (2,742)
- **Twentynine Palms** (26,418)
- Twentynine Palms Marine Corps Base (8,413)
- Valyermo (450)
- **Victorville** (122,312)
- Vidal Junction (17)
- Yermo (4,200)
- **Yucca Valley** (21,726)

== Major highways ==
- State Route 2 / Angeles Crest Highway
- State Route 14 / Antelope Valley Freeway
- Interstate 15
- State Route 18
- Interstate 40
- State Route 58 / Tehachapi Freeway
- State Route 62
- U.S. Route 95
- State Route 127
- State Route 136
- State Route 138 / Pearblossom Highway
- State Route 178
- State Route 190
- State Route 247
- U.S. Route 395

== In the arts ==
=== Literature ===
- Louis L'Amour's Western novel The Lonesome Gods uses features of the Mojave and Colorado Deserts in its narrative.
- James Spooner's 2022 graphic memoir The High Desert: Black. Punk. Nowhere. depicts the author's experiences as a Black teenager in the punk rock scene of Apple Valley.

=== Motion pictures ===
Popular filming sites

- The Alabama Hills and Red Rock Canyon have been filming locations for numerous Westerns.
- Boomtowns that prospered during Route 66 and railroad travel in the early 20th century include Amboy, Cima and Ludlow, and are also used in principal photography and location shots.
- Southern California Logistics Airport (George Air Force Base, decommissioned in 1992) is used often for military dramas and action films.

Exemplary projects

- Stagecoach (1939), Lucerne Valley
- The Treasure of the Sierra Madre (1948), Red Rock Canyon State Park (California)−
- Westworld (1973), Red Rock Canyon State Park
- Bagdad Cafe (1987), Newberry Springs
- Jurassic Park (1993), Red Rock Canyon State Park
- Casino (1995), Palmdale
- Contact (1997), Adelanto
- Face/Off (1997), Victorville
- Jarhead (2005), Victorville
- Valkyrie (2008), Victorville

Films using High Desert as a subject of the narrative

- Erin Brockovich (2000), centered on the PG&E environmental disaster in the town of Hinkley west of Barstow.
- The Right Stuff (1983), based on the 1979 non-fiction book by Tom Wolfe about the pilots engaged in U.S. postwar research with experimental rocket-powered, high-speed aircraft at Edwards Air Force Base as well as documenting the stories of the first Project Mercury astronauts selected for the NASA space program.
- Space Cowboys (2000), one of many examples that feature Edwards Air Force Base in the 1940s used in experimental test flights and for shuttle landings with the NASA Space Program.

== See also ==
- Victorville Army Airfield auxiliary fields
- High Desert County, California
