= Ravanna, Kansas =

Ghost town in Finney County, Kansas

- Ghost town
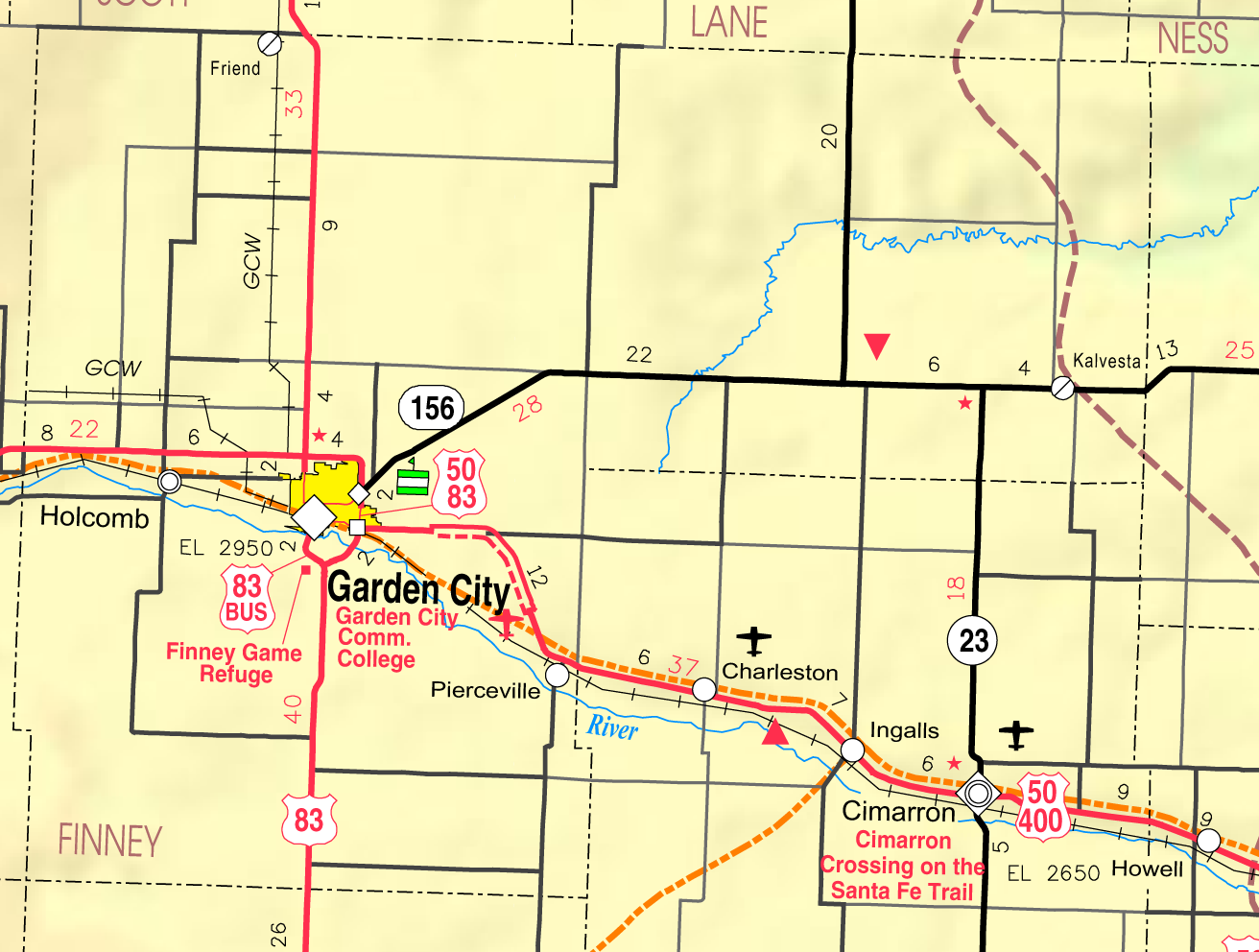
- KDOT map of Finney County (legend)

- Location within the state of Kansas
- Coordinates: 38°09′35″N 100°22′57″W
- Country: United States
- State: Kansas
- County: Finney
- Founded: 1882
- Elevation: 2,559 ft (780 m)

Population
  - Total: 0
- Time zone: UTC-6 (CST)
  - Summer (DST): UTC-5 (CDT)
- Area code: 620
- FIPS code: 20-58530
- GNIS ID: 484567

Ravanna is a ghost town in Finney County, Kansas, United States. It is located approximately 30 miles (48 km) east-northeast of Garden City.

== History ==
Ravanna was founded in 1882.

In 1887, it was one of two towns that vied to become the county seat of the now defunct Garfield County, which merged into Finney County in 1893.

The post office in Ravanna closed permanently in 1922.

Today, brick pillars of the old courthouse (which was never used) and schoolhouse and a cemetery can be seen at the site of what was once Ravanna.

== Geography ==
=== Climate ===
According to the Köppen Climate Classification system, Ravanna has a semi-arid climate, abbreviated "BSk" on climate maps.
