= Mojave County, California =

1998 Proposal to form a new county in California

Mojave County was a proposal in 1988 that would have split the northern and eastern 90% of San Bernardino County, currently the largest county in area in the contiguous United States, from the more urbanized southwestern 10%.

Proponents of the measure argued that their region was far too removed from the county seat at San Bernardino and that they were distinct in many ways from the Inland Empire. Areas included in the proposed county would have included the cities of Victorville, Barstow, Big Bear, Yucca Valley, Twentynine Palms and the isolated community of Needles along the Colorado River, a community closer to Las Vegas than to its county seat.

The proposal would have left the remainder of San Bernardino County confined to the area of the lower southwestern, more populous part of the county.

The measure was ultimately defeated.
