= Volcano House (California) =

House in Southern California, United States

Coordinates: 34°51′04″N 116°33′25″W

Volcano House, also known as the Cinder Cone House, Vulcania and Volcania, near Newberry Springs in San Bernardino County, Southern California, United States, is a mid-century modern house designed by architect Harold James Bissner Jr. and built in 1968–1969 on top of a 150-foot-high (46-meter) extinct volcanic cinder cone. The house has far-reaching views over the western Mojave Desert, the Newberry Mountains, and the Rodman Mountains. A private house not open to the public, it has nevertheless attracted attention due to its prominent location and striking design. It has been described as "a desert masterpiece" and "an architectural icon", "remarkable", and "iconic", has featured in several architectural digests, and has been used as a film location.

The house estate is bordered on three sides by Federal lands, including the lakebed of Troy Lake, a dry lake of the Mojave.

== Commission by and design and construction for Vard Wallace ==
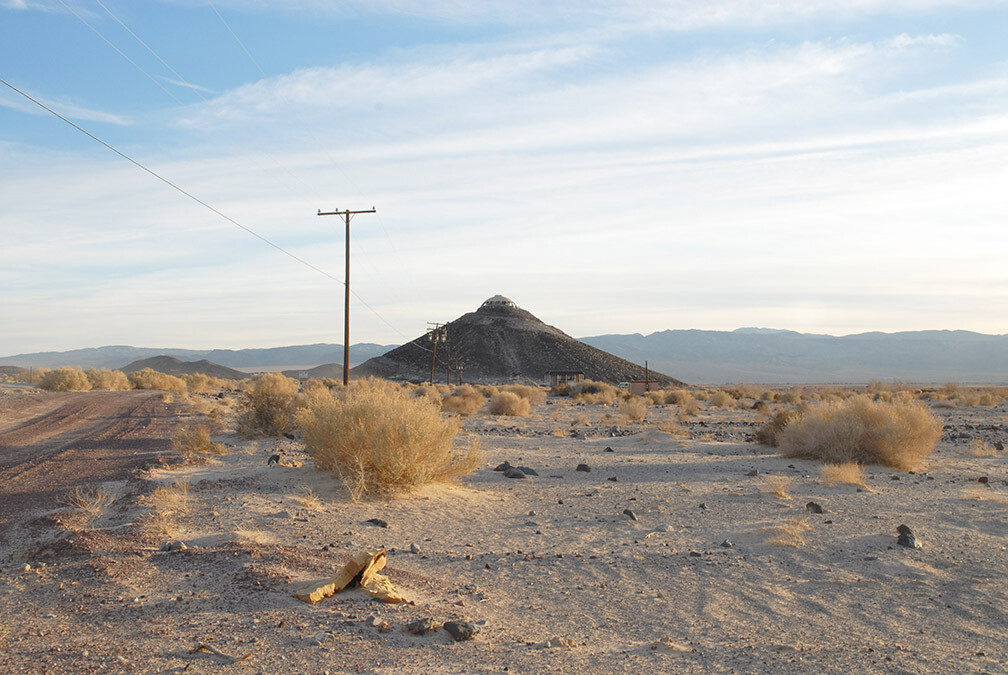
View of Volcano House, 1968–1969, architect Harold James Bissner Jr.

The house was commissioned by engineer, inventor and draftsman Vard Wallace, who had made his fortune drafting machines and airplane parts to Lockheed Corporation during and after World War II, through his company Vard, Inc. Wallace was introduced to the site by his personal secretary on a weekend trip. Immediately taken by the site, he imagined a dwelling atop the isolated cinder cone. He was able to buy the cone and surrounding land, and intended the house to be a retreat for him and his wife Mabel; their main residence was at Newport Beach.

Wallace was inspired by one of the dome-shaped buildings at the San Onofre Nuclear Generating Station, California, which was being constructed in 1967–1968. (Note: Many references describe this as the "visitor center" or "reception center"; an earlier reference (2004) has Bissner the architect describing the building there as the "pavilion".) His twin passions were fishing and astronomy, (Note: Several references mistakenly refer to this as "astrology".) so he asked architect Harold James Bissner Jr (1925–2020) of Nyberg & Bissner Inc., Pasadena, to reflect these when designing the house. Bissner recollected that the original design, including an observation deck for Wallace's telescope and a sizable lake, was completed in one afternoon.

A spiral track was bulldozed up the side of the cinder cone, and the top of the cone was flattened off. The logistics of building at such an isolated desert site, with limited access and room, proved considerable. The building is 16-sided, and is anchored in a reinforced concrete ring that supports the dome. The arched beams were built on-site, out of 1×2-inch redwood that was glued and nailed. The domed roof came low to the ground to prevent the sun from reaching into the house, and was covered with a sprayed layer of white latex amalgam, to act as waterproofing and also to reflect the heat.

The circular house, in total 2,206 square feet (204.9 m^{2}), was built around a central core that accommodates the chimney, and is largely open-plan. The living room has a conversation pit in front of a fireplace; other rooms are a kitchen, two bedrooms, and two bathrooms. The core and integral fireplace are faced with stone from the nearby Calico Mountains. There is an upper walkway around the central core, and as none of the rooms have an integral ceiling, all the rooms can be looked into from it. An open circular deck at the top of the dome is reached by stairs up from the walkway. This observation platform allows 360-degree views over the desert. A 5-foot-wide (1.5-meter) dry moat encircles the house beneath the domed roof awning: this was originally meant to be filled with water. Next to the house is a carport, the roof of which served as a deck. At the base of the cinder cone a two-story building was built. Wallace's machine shop was housed on the ground floor while the caretaker's residence was above on the first floor. A 4-acre (1.6-hectare) lake with an island was also constructed to the north of the cinder cone. The house was completed in the autumn of 1969.

The house has variously been described as "a galactic-looking saucer", "a white hubcap", "[crying] out for placement on the Star Wars planet Tatooine", "flying-saucer shaped", "reminding of a spaceship based on a lonely planet", and "spaceship-like". The house has also been compared to a Bondesque supervillain's lair.

== Ownership after Wallace 2000–2004 ==
Wallace sold the house in 2000, after some of his machinery was stolen from the machine shop. The new owners were a Los-Angeles-based surgeon and his wife. The house was next purchased by its third owner, British real estate broker and developer Richard Bailey. In March 2003 Bailey put the house on the market, with an asking price of $795,000; this was reduced to $599,000 in February 2004. It was bought by television presenter Huell Howser (1945–2013). (Note: Many references give the date of Howser's purchase of the house as 2003, but this is clearly incorrect as it was still listed for sale on February 8, 2004.)

== Huell Howser ownership 2004–2012 ==
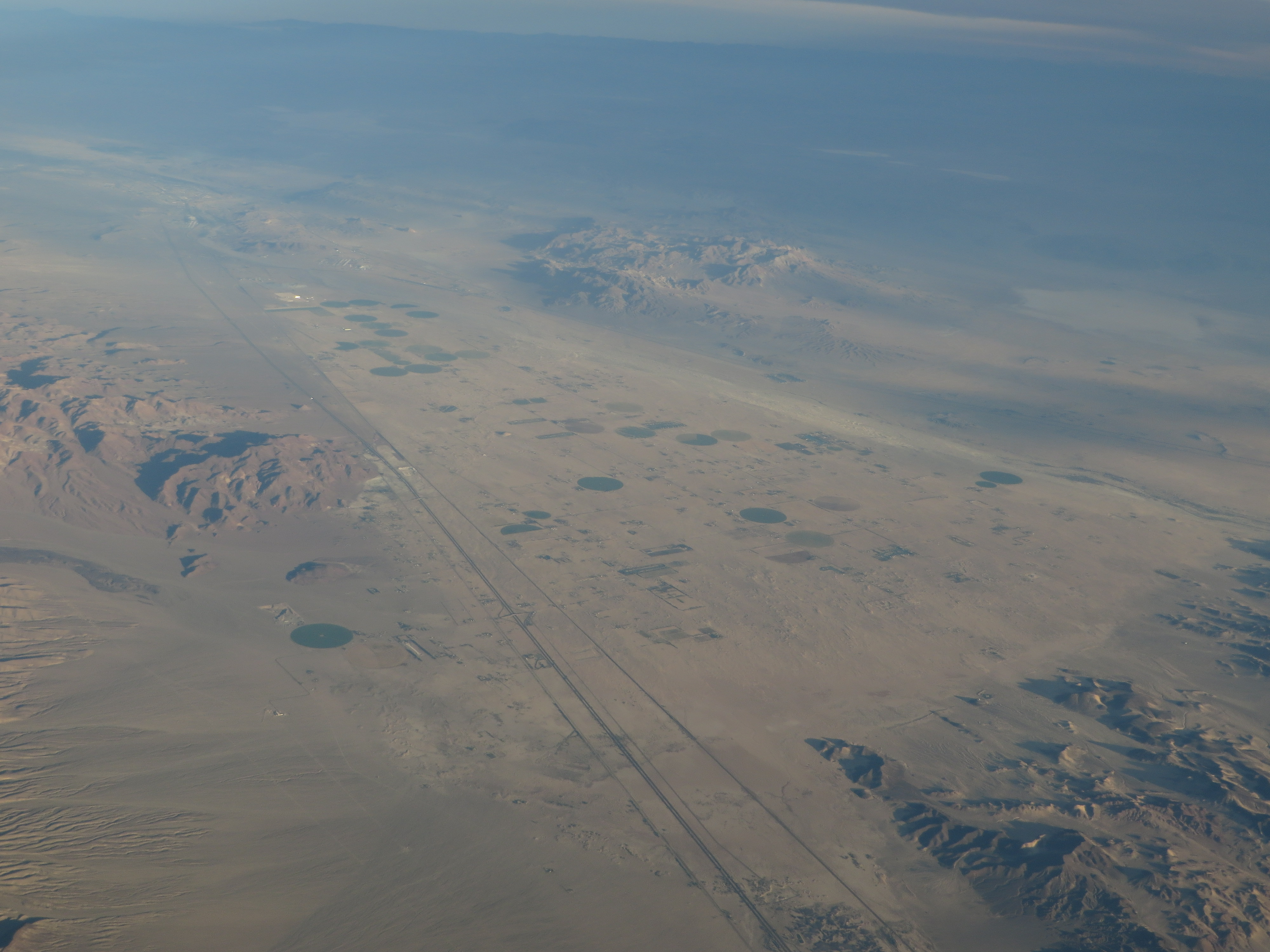
Aerial view of the Newberry Springs area, looking northwest. Volcano House is in the bottom right corner, an isolated white-topped cinder cone, just above the mountain ranges.

Howser filled the house with mid-century modern furniture, and retained many of its period features, including the shag-pile carpets. However, it was never his permanent residence, as he found it too isolated. In 2010 Howser put the house up for sale for $650,000 but later donated it to Chapman University.

== Chapman University ownership 2012–2015 ==
In June 2012, The Panther, a student-run newspaper for Chapman University, announced that Howser had donated the Volcano House to the school. Howser's offer had been made over lunch with Jim Doti, Chapman's president: "As they sat on the patio, Doti asked about the house and Howser said something like: 'Oh yeah, I bought that 10 years ago. I hardly ever used it, but I fell in love with the place. Why? Do you want it?'".

The university hoped to use the house as a separate campus, mainly for astronomy, geology, and desert studies, but its remote location proved impractical and the plan was never put into operation.

The university spent $500,000 restoring the house over a six-month period. In early September 2015 the house and 60-acre (24-hectare) estate was put up for sale with an asking price of $650,000.

In September 2015, Chapman University sold the Volcano House for $750,000. The house had multiple offers and sold within five days of being on the market, at $100,000 over the asking price.

== Private ownership 2015 onward ==
The house is not open to the public, but can be viewed at a distance from the public highway of Silver Valley Road.

== In popular culture ==
The house exterior features in the first part of the 2003 video for "In da Club" by American rapper 50 Cent. As of September 10, 2025, the video has had 2.466 billion views.

The house (exteriors only) served as the mysterious headquarters in the 2022 American psychological thriller film Don't Worry Darling, starring Florence Pugh and Harry Styles. The deck was dismantled and a larger one built in its place with stairs built for access, and mirrors added, but otherwise the house was left untouched.
