= Lake Dolores =

Lake Dolores may be:

- Laguna Dolores the filled lake in San Francisco
- Lake Dolores Waterpark
