= Lenwood, California =

Lenwood
- census-designated place
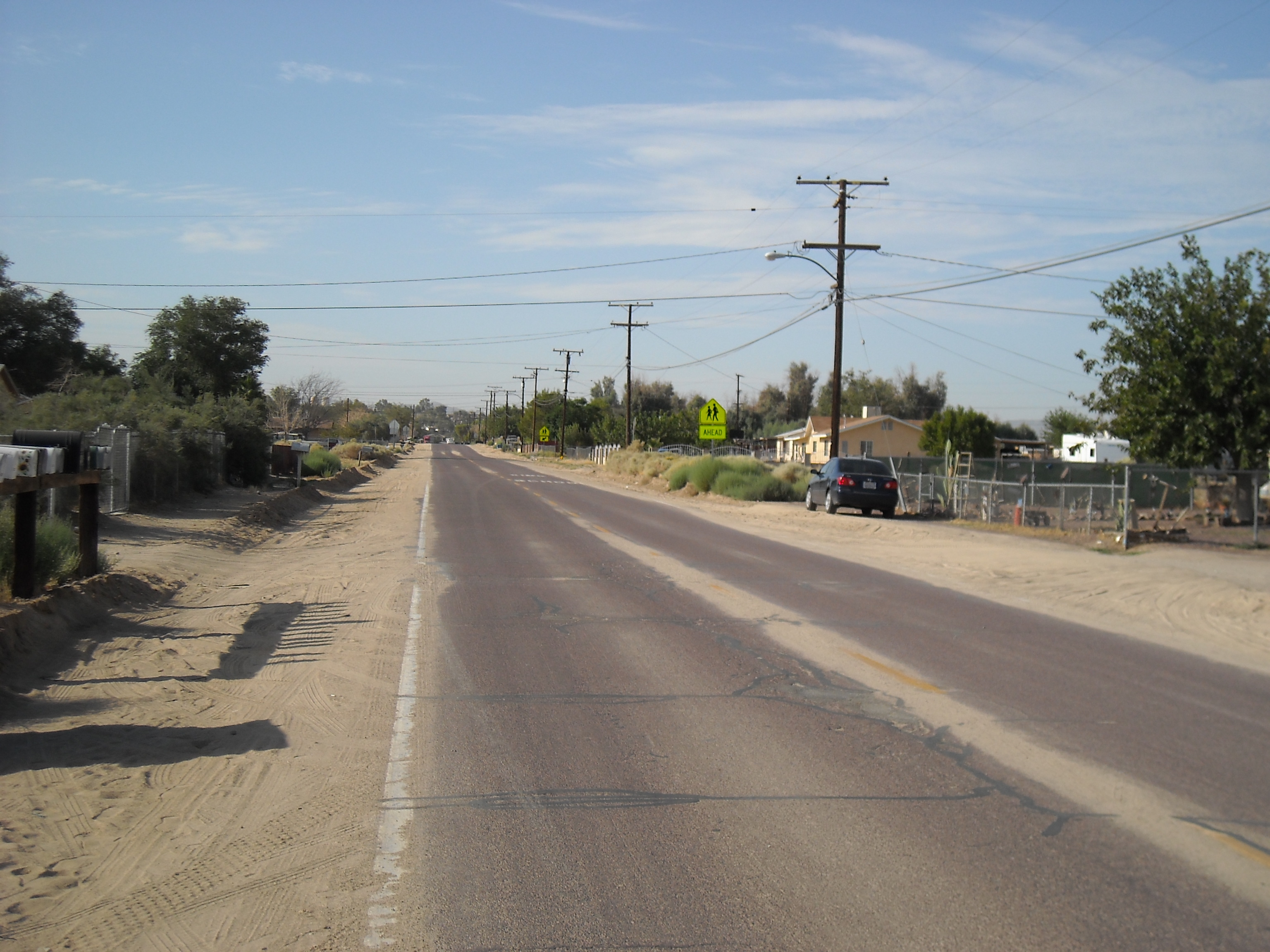
- A street in Lenwood

- Location in San Bernardino County and the state of California

- Location in the United States
- Coordinates: 34°53′N 117°6′W
- Country: United States
- State: California
- County: San Bernardino

Area
  - Total: 2.081 sq mi (5.390 km^{2})
  - Land: 2.081 sq mi (5.390 km^{2})
  - Water: 0 sq mi (0 km^{2}) 0%
- Elevation: 2,277 ft (694 m)

Population (2020)
  - Total: 3,623
  - Density: 1,741/sq mi (672.2/km^{2})
- Time zone: UTC-8 (PST)
  - Summer (DST): UTC-7 (PDT)
- ZIP code: 92311
- Area codes: 442/760
- FIPS code: 06-41194
- GNIS feature ID: 1660906

Lenwood is a census-designated place (CDP) in the Mojave Desert near Barstow, in San Bernardino County, California, United States.

The population was 3,623 at the 2020 census, up from 3,543 at the 2010 census. It is located on the Mojave River, 3 miles (4.8 km) west of Barstow.

== Geography ==
Lenwood is located at 34°53′N 117°6′W (34.878, -117.108).

According to the United States Census Bureau, the CDP has a total area of 2.1 square miles (5.4 km^{2}), all land.

== Demographics ==
Historical population
Census	Pop.	Note	%±
1960	2,407		—
1970	3,834		59.3%
1980	2,974		−22.4%
1990	3,190		7.3%
2000	3,222		1.0%
2010	3,543		10.0%
2020	3,623		2.3%
U.S. Decennial Census; 1850–1870 1880-1890; 1900 1910 1920; 1930 1940 1950; 1960 1970 1980; 1990 2000 2010

Lake Arrowhead was first listed as an unincorporated place in the 1960 U.S. census; and then as a census designated place in the 1980 U.S. census.

=== 2020 census ===
As of the 2020 census, Lenwood had a population of 3,623 and a population density of 1,741.0 inhabitants per square mile (672.2/km^{2}).

Racial composition as of the 2020 census
Race	Number	Percent
White	1,536	42.4%
Black or African American	330	9.1%
American Indian and Alaska Native	89	2.5%
Asian	45	1.2%
Native Hawaiian and Other Pacific Islander	31	0.9%
Some other race	908	25.1%
Two or more races	684	18.9%
Hispanic or Latino (of any race)	1,900	52.4%

The whole population lived in households. There were 1,162 households, out of which 41.1% included children under the age of 18, 42.3% were married-couple households, 8.0% were cohabiting couple households, 28.9% had a female householder with no spouse or partner present, and 20.7% had a male householder with no spouse or partner present. 23.0% of households were one person, and 8.5% were one person aged 65 or older. The average household size was 3.12. There were 824 families (70.9% of all households).

The age distribution was 32.1% under the age of 18, 8.9% aged 18 to 24, 25.8% aged 25 to 44, 20.9% aged 45 to 64, and 12.4% who were 65 years of age or older. The median age was 31.4 years. For every 100 females, there were 95.8 males, and for every 100 females age 18 and over, there were 93.5 males age 18 and over.

96.0% of residents lived in urban areas, while 4.0% lived in rural areas.

There were 1,237 housing units at an average density of 594.4 units per square mile (229.5 units/km^{2}), of which 1,162 (93.9%) were occupied. Of these, 51.2% were owner-occupied, and 48.8% were occupied by renters. The remaining 6.1% were vacant. The homeowner vacancy rate was 1.2%, and the rental vacancy rate was 5.7%.

=== Income and poverty ===
In 2023, the US Census Bureau estimated that the median household income was $70,714, and the per capita income was $23,690. About 17.3% of families and 18.0% of the population were below the poverty line.

=== 2010 census ===
At the 2010 census Lenwood had a population of 3,543. The population density was 1,600.6 inhabitants per square mile (618.0/km^{2}). The racial makeup of Lenwood was 2,133 (60.2%) White (41.6% Non-Hispanic White), 219 (6.2%) African American, 94 (2.7%) Native American, 37 (1.0%) Asian, 25 (0.7%) Pacific Islander, 813 (22.9%) from other races, and 222 (6.3%) from two or more races. Hispanic or Latino of any race were 1,675 persons (47.3%).

The whole population lived in households, no one lived in non-institutionalized group quarters and no one was institutionalized.

There were 1,133 households, 524 (46.2%) had children under the age of 18 living in them, 543 (47.9%) were opposite-sex married couples living together, 214 (18.9%) had a female householder with no husband present, 101 (8.9%) had a male householder with no wife present. There were 122 (10.8%) unmarried opposite-sex partnerships, and 11 (1.0%) same-sex married couples or partnerships. 206 households (18.2%) were one person and 66 (5.8%) had someone living alone who was 65 or older. The average household size was 3.13. There were 858 families (75.7% of households); the average family size was 3.50.

The age distribution was 1,158 people (32.7%) under the age of 18, 356 people (10.0%) aged 18 to 24, 919 people (25.9%) aged 25 to 44, 801 people (22.6%) aged 45 to 64, and 309 people (8.7%) who were 65 or older. The median age was 29.4 years. For every 100 females, there were 99.9 males. For every 100 females age 18 and over, there were 98.9 males.

There were 1,282 housing units at an average density of 579.2 per square mile, of the occupied units 636 (56.1%) were owner-occupied and 497 (43.9%) were rented. The homeowner vacancy rate was 3.5%; the rental vacancy rate was 8.3%. 1,822 people (51.4% of the population) lived in owner-occupied housing units and 1,721 people (48.6%) lived in rental housing units.

According to the 2010 United States Census, Lenwood had a median household income of $44,375, with 25.5% of the population living below the federal poverty line.

== Government ==
In the California State Legislature, Lenwood is in the 19th senatorial district, represented by Republican Rosilicie Ochoa Bogh, and in the 34th Assembly district, represented by Republican Tom Lackey.

In the United States House of Representatives, Lenwood is in California's 23rd congressional district, represented by Republican Jay Obernolte.

== Media ==
In 2015, Lenwood was one of the filming locations for the film Sky as well as Barstow, Bombay Beach, Hinkley, Joshua Tree, Landers, Ludlow, Newberry Springs, and Victorville, California.

== Education ==
It is in the Barstow Unified School District.
