= Newberry Mountains =

Newberry Mountains can refer to:

- Newberry Mountains (California)
- Newberry Mountains (Nevada)

== See also ==
- Newberry (disambiguation)
