= Ord Mountains =

Mountain range in the Mojave Desert of California, US

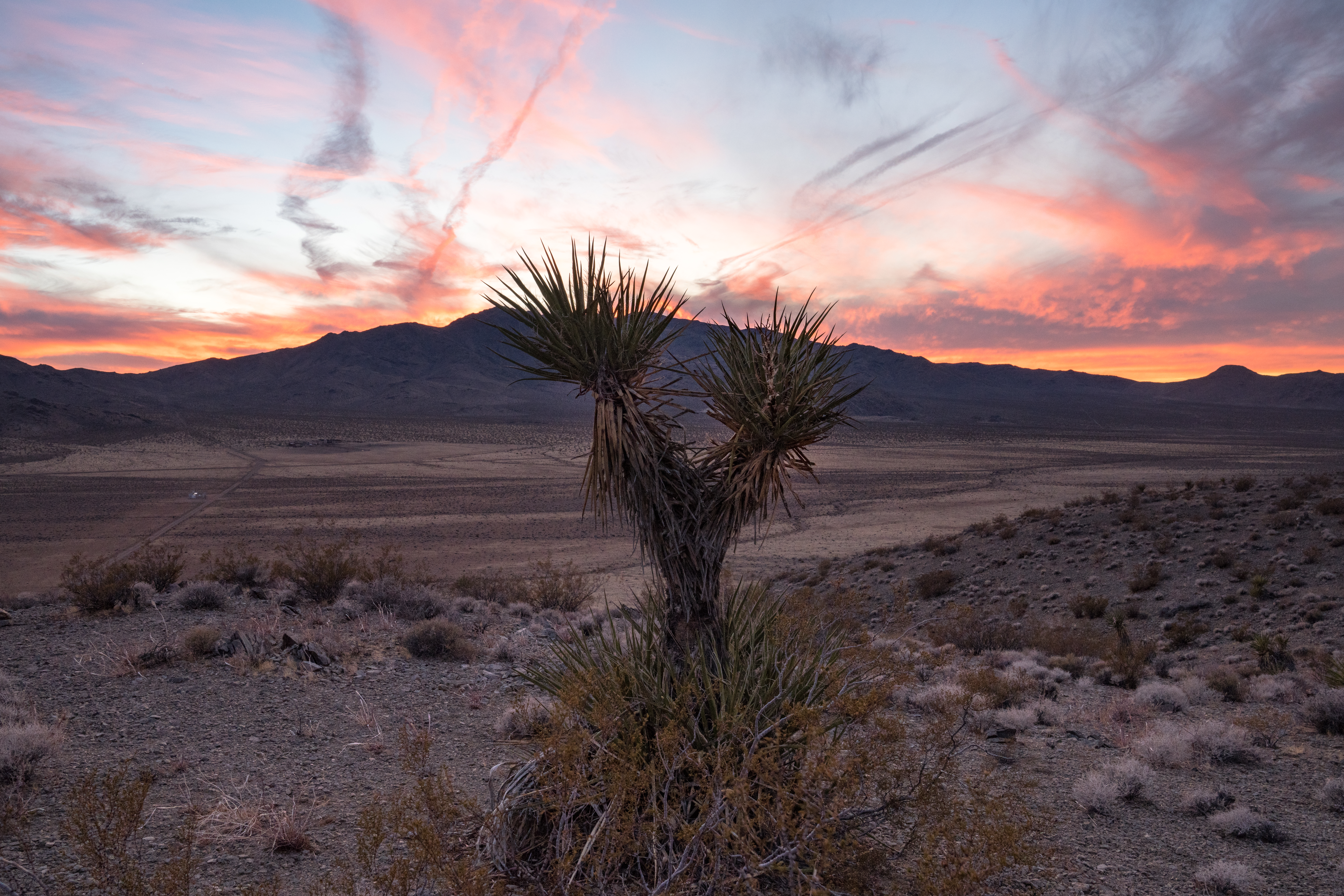

Highest point
- Elevation: 6,309 ft (1,923 m)

Geography
- Location within California
- Country: United States
- State: California
- District: San Bernardino County
- Range coordinates: 34°39′27.976″N 116°45′9.111″W
- Topo map: USGS Ord Mountain

The Ord Mountains are located in the Mojave Desert of southern California, USA. The range lies in a generally east–west direction, and reaches an elevation of 6,309 feet (1,923 m) above sea level at Ord Mountain. The area is administered by the Bureau of Land Management. The Ord Mountain Trail goes through one section of the mountains.

== Geography ==
The range is approximately 14 miles (23 km) long, 15 mi (24 km) northeast of Apple Valley and 19 mi (31 km) miles southeast of Barstow. To the north is Daggett Ridge and the Newberry Mountains; northwest is Stoddard Ridge and Goat Mountain; to the west is Sidewinder Mountain; to the south is the North Lucerne Valley; to the southeast are the Fry Mountains; and to the east, the Rodman Mountains.

There are three main peaks: West Ord Mountain 5,513 feet (1,680 m) above sea level, at 34.6459719, -116.9061163; East Ord Mountain 6,139 feet (1,871 m) at 34.639102, -116.762657; and Ord Mountain at 6,309 feet (1,923 m) at 34.674967, -116.815186.

== Mining ==
In the late 1800s, the area was part of the Ord Mountain Mining District. In the early 1900s, about 500 tons of gold and silver ore were mined, and copper was mined during the World Wars. Dozens of minerals have been noted here, including potential molybdenum assets.
