= Rodman Mountains =

Mountain range in California, United States

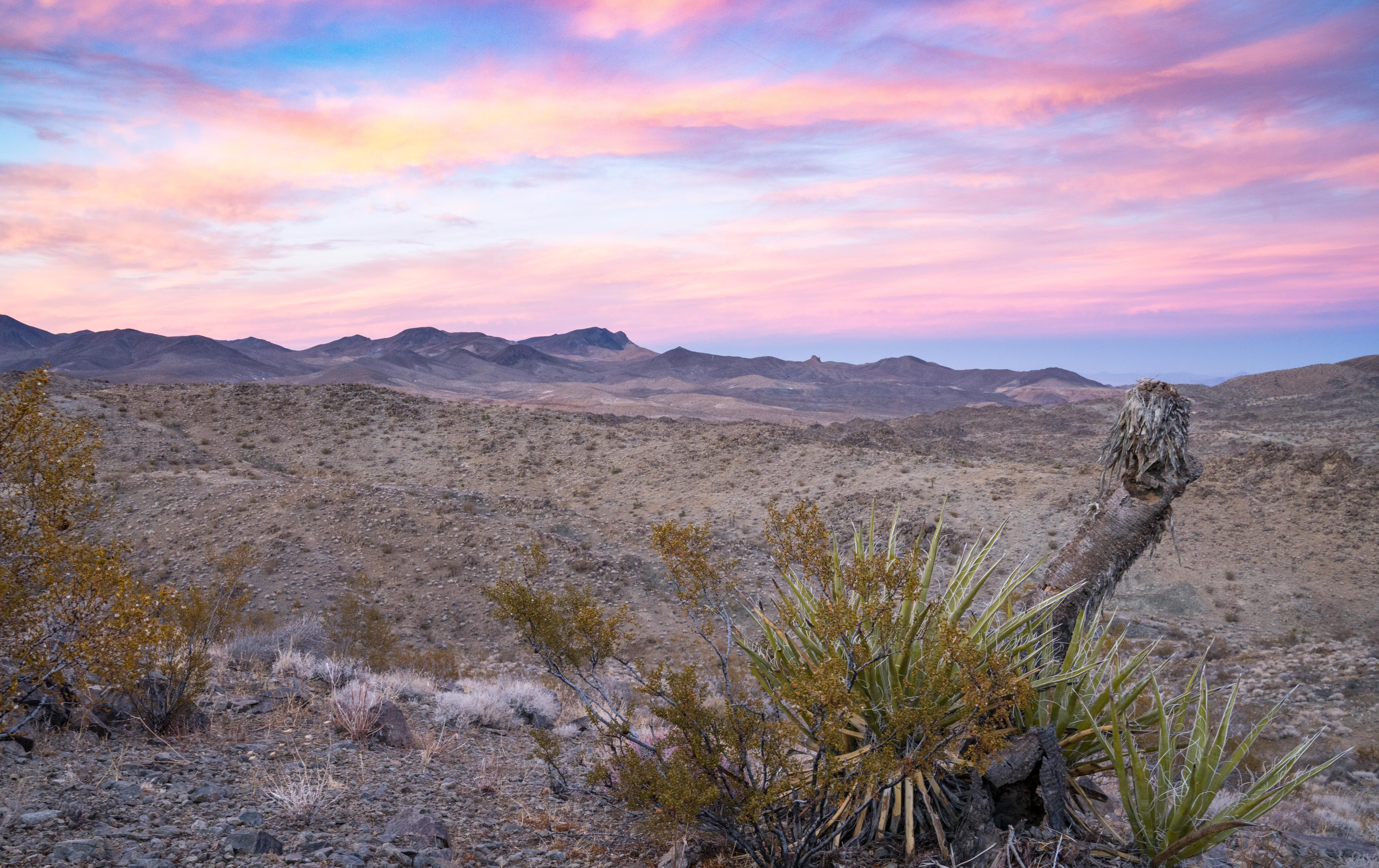
- Rodman Mountains Wilderness

Highest point
- Elevation: 1,323 m (4,341 ft)

Geography
- Location within California
- Country: United States
- State: California
- Region: Mojave Desert
- District: San Bernardino County
- Range coordinates: 34°42′N 116°38′W
- Topo map: USGS Camp Rock Mine

The Rodman Mountains are located in the Mojave Desert, in San Bernardino County, California, United States. The range is located south of Interstate 40 and Newberry Springs, and east of the Ord Mountains and northwest of the Bullion Mountains. They are 30 miles southeast of Barstow, California.

One of the Cinder cones of the Lavic Lake volcanic field are in the range, with the other three including Pisgah Crater beyond to the east.

== Wilderness ==
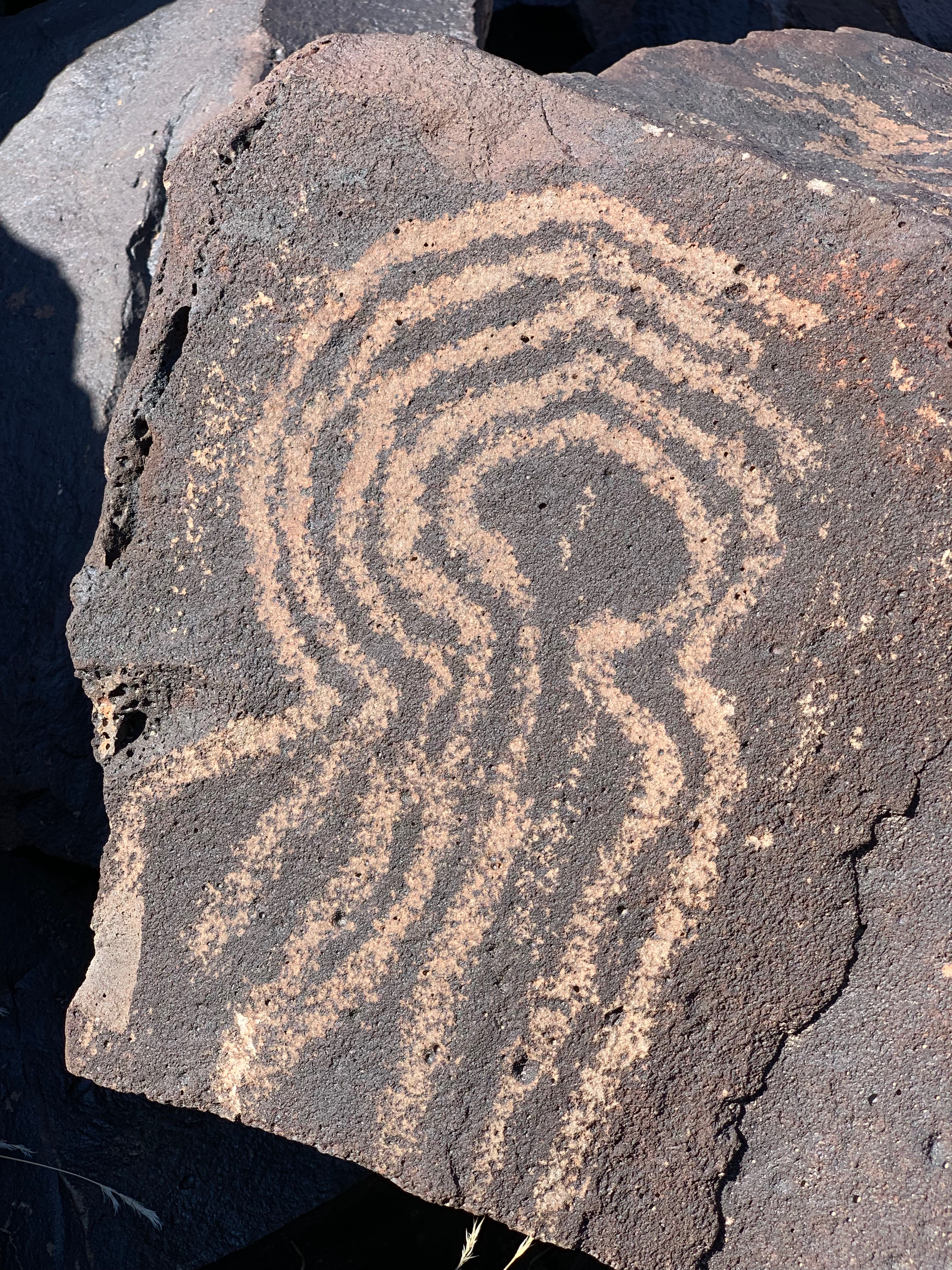
Rodman Mountain petroglyphs example. See Commons for more examples (link at left)

Established in 1994 by the U.S. Congress, the 34,264 acre Rodman Mountains Wilderness is managed by the U.S. Bureau of Land Management as part of the National Wilderness Preservation System. A series of ridges and valleys climbing from 2,000 feet to almost 5,000 feet are the result of faults which cross this wilderness area. A lava flow slices this area in two from northwest to southeast, forming a sloping mesa.

Colorful escarpments, calico-colored mountains, maze-like canyons and broad bajadas come together here. Steep canyons and cliff-like walls form dry falls along deep drainage channels, creating cascades during heavy rain storms. More than a half dozen natural water "tanks" sit within the lava flow. Two of the tanks, Hidden Tank and Deep Tank, hold thousands of gallons of water, drawing wildlife.

One of only seven core raptor breeding areas in the Mojave Desert is within this wilderness, where prairie falcons and golden eagles are known to survive. The mountains themselves are part of the historic range of the Desert Bighorn Sheep. While sheep have not been spotted here, this wildlife species has been seen in the nearby Newberry Mountains.
