= Fabienne Berthaud =

French actress and film director

Fabienne Berthaud (French pronunciation: [fabjɛn bɛʁto], born in 1966, Gap) is a French writer, actress, screenwriter and director, winner of the 2011 prix Françoise Sagan.

== Works ==
=== Bibliography ===
- 1994: Cafard, Albin Michel
- 1999: Mal partout, Éditions du Seuil
- 1999: Moi, par exemple, Fleuve noir
- 2004: Pieds nus sur les limaces, Seuil
- 2011: Un jardin sur le ventre, éd. JBZ et Cie.

=== Filmography ===
==== Director ====
- 1998: Noël en famille, short film
- 1999: « Chair en vie », épisode of the serial Chambre n° 13.
- 2005: Franckie, feature film.
- 2010: Pieds nus sur les limaces (Lily Sometimes), feature film.
- 2015: Sky, feature film
- 2016: Some Needs, Clip by Rover Guest Diane Kruger
- 2019: Un monde plus grand, feature film

==== Actress ====
- 1993: Une femme pour moi by Arnaud Sélignac
