= Barstow Mall =

- Coordinates: 34.888°N 116.999°W
- Address: 1866 E Main St, Barstow, CA 92311
- Opened: 1975
- Developer: E.W. Hahn Company; Ryan-Baron Development Company
- Manager: JC Investment
- Num. of stores: 4
- Num. of anchor tenants: 2
- Floor area: 141,819 square feet (13,175.4 m^{2})
- Floors: 1

Barstow Mall is a small shopping mall in Barstow, California. It was formerly anchored by Kmart and Sears.

== History ==
The Kmart store was originally slated to be W. T. Grant, which withdrew from the mall plans due to the chain's filing for bankruptcy. This resulted in the mall being only the second in the country to have both a Kmart and a Sears in it. Ernest Hahn was the mall's developer. The mall, previously delayed due to financial issues, began construction in March 1976, and was planned to have 144,600 sq ft of space including both anchors and 40 interior tenants. Sears was the first store to open at the mall, on October 20, 1976. The mall had its grand opening on November 19, 1976, with tenants including Rude's Department Store, Karl's Shoes, Kinney Shoes, Hartfield's Dress Shop, a card and gift shop, and several smaller clothing and food tenants.

The mall suffered in the early 1990s, with the closure of Kmart in November 1992, followed by the closure of Sears in January 1993. The Sears building was later occupied by a Big Lots discount store, which closed in 2003.

In August 2010, renovations began on the mall at the Sears end for conversion to office space.
