= Pauma Valley, California =

Unincorporated community in California, United States

- Unincorporated community
- Location within the state of California Pauma Valley, California (the United States)
- Coordinates: 33°18′12″N 116°58′53″W
- Country: United States
- State: California
- County: San Diego
- Community services district established: 1961
- Time zone: UTC-8 (Pacific (PST))
  - Summer (DST): UTC-7 (PDT)
- ZIP code: 92061
- Area code: 442/760

Pauma Valley (Pauma, Luiseño for "place where there is water") is a geographic valley and unincorporated community between Valley Center and Palomar Mountain in San Diego County, California. The name also refers to the agricultural region comprising citrus and avocado groves, and the location of several Indian Reservations, a country club, and tribal casinos.

California Route 76 crosses the length of the Pauma Valley and through the community of Pauma Valley, on its route between the coast in Oceanside and California Route 79 near Warner Springs. The valley is at the western base of the Palomar Mountains.

The headquarters of the Pauma Band of Luiseno Mission Indians and La Jolla Band of Luiseno Indians are located in Pauma Valley.

== See also ==
- Pala Indian Reservation
- Pala, California
- Sengme Oaks Water Park
- Mission Indians
- Rancho Pauma
