= Sky (2015 film) =

2015 film

- Theatrical release poster
- Directed by: Fabienne Berthaud
- Written by: Fabienne Berthaud
- Produced by: Gabrielle Dumon; Betrand Faivre
- Starring: Diane Kruger; Norman Reedus; Gilles Lellouche; Lena Dunham; Q'orianka Kilcher
- Cinematography: Nathalie Durand
- Edited by: Pierre Haberer
- Music by: Francois-Eudes Chanfrault; David Drake
- Production companies: Le Bureau; Pandora Filmproduktion; Vamoose Productions
- Distributed by: Haut Et Court; Alamode Films
- Release dates: 16 September 2015 (TIFF); 6 April 2016 (France); 2 June 2016 (Germany)
- Running time: 100 minutes
- Countries: France; Germany
- Languages: English; French

Sky is a 2015 English-language French-German drama film written and directed by Fabienne Berthaud. It stars Diane Kruger, Norman Reedus, Gilles Lellouche, Lena Dunham, Q'orianka Kilcher and Lou Diamond Phillips. It was shown in the Platform section of the 2015 Toronto International Film Festival. The film was released in France on 6 April 2016 by Haut Et Court, and in Germany on 2 June 2016 by Alamode Films.

== Plot ==
Parisian Romy (Diane Kruger) and her husband Richard (Gilles Lellouche) are vacationing in California. One night at a bar, Richard gets drunk and tries to rape Romy in their hotel room. She hits him on the head with a lamp in self-defense and escapes, believing she has killed him. She buys a car and flees, but later decides to turn herself in. While at the police station she learns that her husband is alive, but hospitalized. She visits him in the hospital, breaks up with him, and decides to remain in America. She hitchhikes to Las Vegas, where she meets a local named Charlene and tries to find work. She borrows her bunny costume to make money getting tourists to pay to be photographed with her and two Elvis impersonators. That night, Romy meets Diego (Norman Reedus). They sleep together, and later he slips his address under her door. When her friend evicts her, Romy travels to Diego's place in the California desert, near the Mexican border. She learns he is a California Park Ranger, and they form a relationship.

Eventually Romy discovers that Diego is dying of cancer. He tries to push her away and tells her to leave, but meanwhile she discovers she is pregnant. Diego at first tells her to have an abortion, but relents and reconciles with her as his condition worsens. Romy remains with Diego until he dies, and later settles on his property with their child.

== Cast ==
- Diane Kruger as Romy
- Norman Reedus as Diego
- Gilles Lellouche as Richard
- Lena Dunham as Billie
- Q'orianka Kilcher as Missy
- Lou Diamond Phillips as Duane
- Joshua Jackson as Detective Ruther
- Laurene Landon as Charlene

== Production ==
In October 2014, it was announced that Diane Kruger had been cast in the film, with Fabienne Bertheaud directing from a screenplay she wrote. In February 2015, it was announced that Norman Reedus, Lena Dunham, Gilles Lellouche and Q’orianka Kilcher had been cast in the film. It was also announced that Le Bureau and Pandora would produce the film.

Principal photography began in January 2015.

=== Filming locations ===
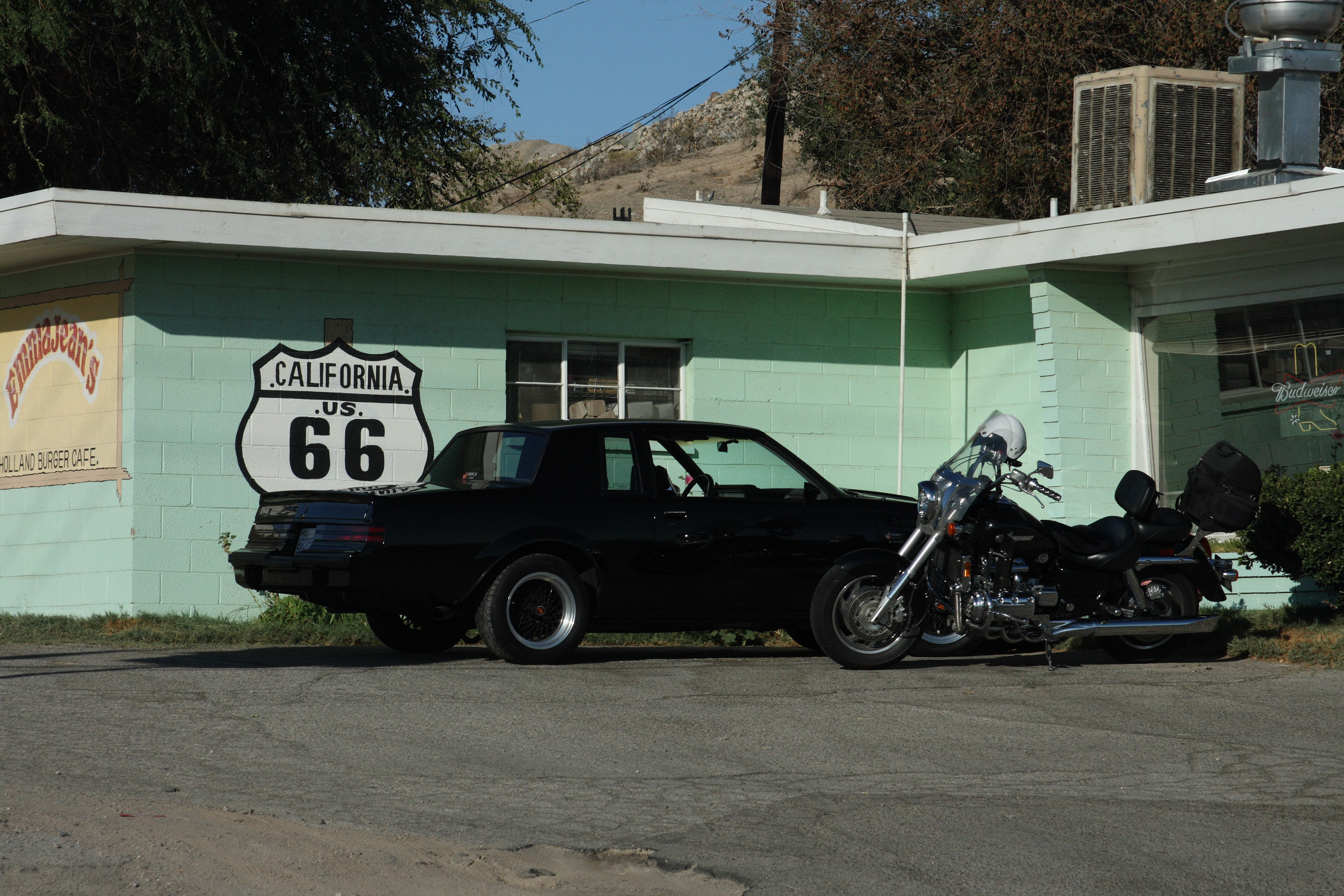
The dinner scene was filmed at Emma Jean's Holland Burger Cafe in Victorville, California.

Filming locations for Sky included Barstow, Bombay Beach, Hinkley, Joshua Tree, Landers, Lenwood, Ludlow, Newberry Springs, and Victorville, California.

== Release ==
In February 2015, it was announced that Haut et Court would distribute the film in France. The film had its world premiere at the 2015 Toronto International Film Festival on 16 September 2015. Shortly after, IFC Films acquired U.S distribution rights to the film. The film was released in France on 6 April 2016. The film was released in the United States in a limited release and through video on demand on 15 April 2016. Netflix started offering Sky to its US subscribers on 1 August 2016.
