= Sengme Oaks Water Park =

Water park in California

- Location: 715 Sengme Oaks Rd, Pauma Valley, CA 92061
- Coordinates: 33.2741°N 116.8571°W
- Owner: La Jolla Band of Luiseño Indians
- Opened: 2023
- Status: Operating
- Area: 20 acres (8.1 ha)
- Pools: 2 pools
- Water slides: 5 water slides

Sengme Oaks Water Park is a water park in Pauma Valley, California. Formerly abandoned, it was renovated and remodeled by the La Jolla Band of Luiseño Indians and was reopened in 2023. It was the first water park in America on a Native reservation.

== History ==
The water park initially opened on July 4, 1985, and had eight slides, with people being able to reach 50 mph (80 km/h) on some. Slides were manufactured by WhiteWater West. It measured 20 acres (8.1 ha) in size and could hold 2,000 people in all. A wave pool and tube rapids were added later. During its peak, it utilized 45 employees. Many of the people visiting the park were from San Diego, about 60 mi (97 km) south, so when water parks began to appear there, guests began to dwindle despite its strong start in its early decades. The park closed in 2008. It was not destroyed and its remains were popular with urban explorers. Many of the structures were graffitied.

== Features ==
The new park has two pools, a larger, shallow, one with three slides and a "mushroom fountain" in its center — seven jets arc over the pool from the edges. The smaller pool is deeper and has two spiral slides that are faster than the ones at the larger pool.

== See also ==
- Lake Dolores Waterpark, another abandoned water park
