= Barstow Unified School District =

School district in California, United States

Address
- 551 South Avenue H Barstow, California, 92311; United States

District information
- Superintendent: Jeff Malan
- NCES District ID: 0604020

Students and staff
- Students: 6,129 (2020–2021)
- Teachers: 265.39 (FTE)
- Staff: 328.0 (FTE)
- Student–teacher ratio: 23.09:1

Other information
- Website: www.busdk12.com

Barstow Unified School District is a public school district based in Barstow, which is located in the Mojave Desert, in northern San Bernardino County, California.

In addition to Barstow, it includes Lenwood.

The District has fifteen schools, including Barstow High School.
