= Brett Novak =

American filmmaker and director

- Born: Lombard, Illinois, United States
- Occupation: Film director

Brett Novak is an American filmmaker and director, best known for his short skateboard related films; particularly his collaborations with Spanish professional skateboarder Kilian Martin.

== Biography ==
=== Early life ===
Novak was born in the western Chicago suburb of Lombard, Illinois. Majoring in Digital Arts and Design, he graduated from Full Sail University in 2007.

=== Early career ===
Upon moving to Los Angeles in 2008, Novak started work in the Visual Effects industry working on music videos for artists such as Beyonce, Lil Wayne, Britney Spears and Lady Gaga. He would go on to incorporate his Visual Effects experience into his later independent skateboard work.

== Collaborations with Kilian Martin ==
Brett Novak and Kilian Martin met in 2009 competing against each other in a California freestyle-skateboarding contest. Their first video collaboration entitled "Kilian Martin: Freestyle Skateboarding", filmed in November 2009 in Los Angeles, California, prominently featured Martin's freestyle roots as a skateboarder and was met with moderate online success. Their follow up project, "Kilian Martin: a Skate Escalation" , this time focusing on Martin's street-skateboarding abilities, quickly went viral (3,390,000 views as of March 2016) pushing the two to continue creating newer projects together. As of March 2016, they have completed 8 short films together.

=== Concrete Circus / A Skate Illustration ===
In 2011, Brett and Kilian starred alongside professional trials cyclist Danny MacAskill in the Channel 4 English Documentary "Concrete Circus". The film featured the two on their journey around the United Kingdom while they filmed their fourth short film together, "Kilian Martin: a Skate Illustration" .

=== Altered Route ===
In 2012, Novak and Martin were approached by Mercedes-Benz to collaborate on what would become their fifth project together, "Kilian Martin: Altered Route" . Filmed in the now defunct California Lake Dolores Waterpark, the video features Martin skateboarding the abandoned ruins of the once thriving park. As of March 2016 the video has seen over 2 million views on YouTube.

=== Last Call with Carson Daly ===
In 2013 Novak and Martin appeared on the American late night television program Last Call with Carson Daly.

== Other works ==
In 2013, Novak directed a music video for the American rock band Deftones starring skateboarder Jason Park.

In 2014 Novak was commissioned by The Halsey Institute of Contemporary Art to direct a documentary into the life and work of artist Shepard Fairey. The video, entitled "Obey This Film", follows Shepard through the development of an exhibition, as well as his outdoor mural process.
