= Barstow, California =

City in California, United States

- City
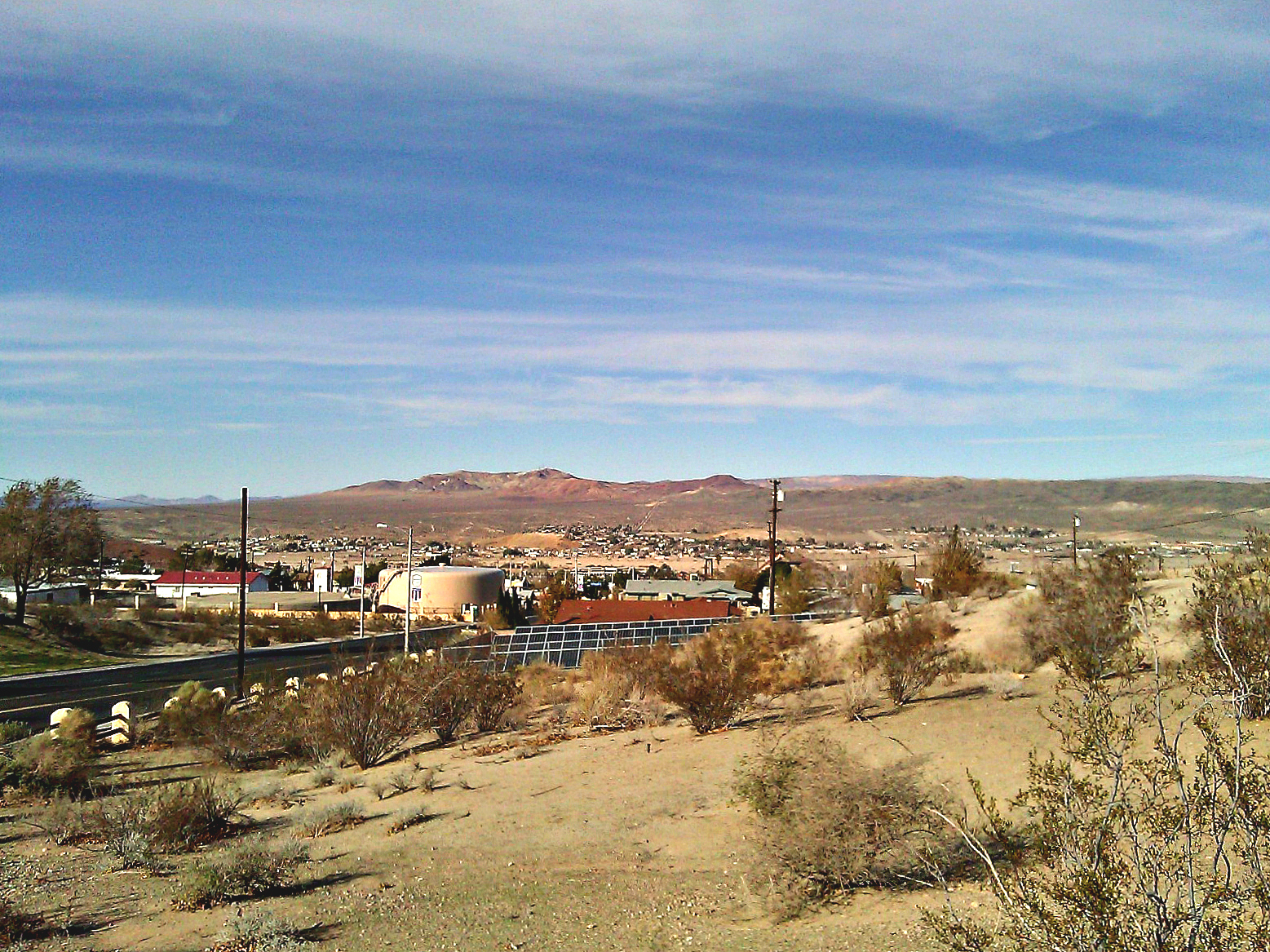
- View of Barstow

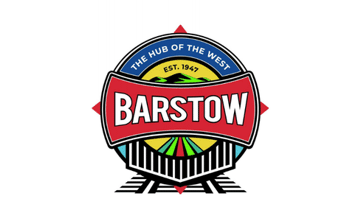
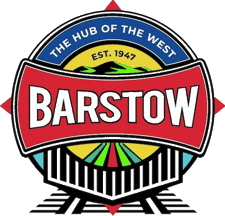
- Flag Seal
- Motto: "Crossroads of Opportunity"
- Interactive map of Barstow, California
- Location within California Location within the United States
- Coordinates: 34°54′N 117°1′W
- Country: United States
- State: California
- County: San Bernardino
- Incorporated: September 30, 1947
- Named for: William Barstow Strong

Government
  - Type: Council-manager
  - Mayor: Timothy R. Silva
  - City council: Carmen Hernandez, James Noble, Barbara M. Rose and John "Tex" Williams
  - City treasurer: Michael Lewis
  - City manager: Rochelle Clayton
  - City clerk: Andrea Flores

Area
  - Total: 41.34 sq mi (107.08 km^{2})
  - Land: 41.30 sq mi (106.96 km^{2})
  - Water: 0.042 sq mi (0.11 km^{2}) 0.02%
- Elevation: 2,175 ft (663 m)

Population (2020)
  - Total: 25,415
  - Density: 615/sq mi (237.6/km^{2})
- Demonym: Barstonian
- Time zone: UTC−08:00 (PST)
  - Summer (DST): UTC−07:00 (PDT)
- ZIP Codes: 92311–92312
- Area codes: 442/760
- FIPS code: 06-04030
- GNIS feature IDs: 1652670, 2409790
- Website: www.barstowca.org

Barstow (pronounced BAR-stoh) is a city in San Bernardino County, California, United States, in the Mojave Desert of Southern California. Located in the Inland Empire region of California, the population was 25,415 at the 2020 census. Barstow is an important crossroads for the Inland Empire and home to Marine Corps Logistics Base Barstow.

== History ==
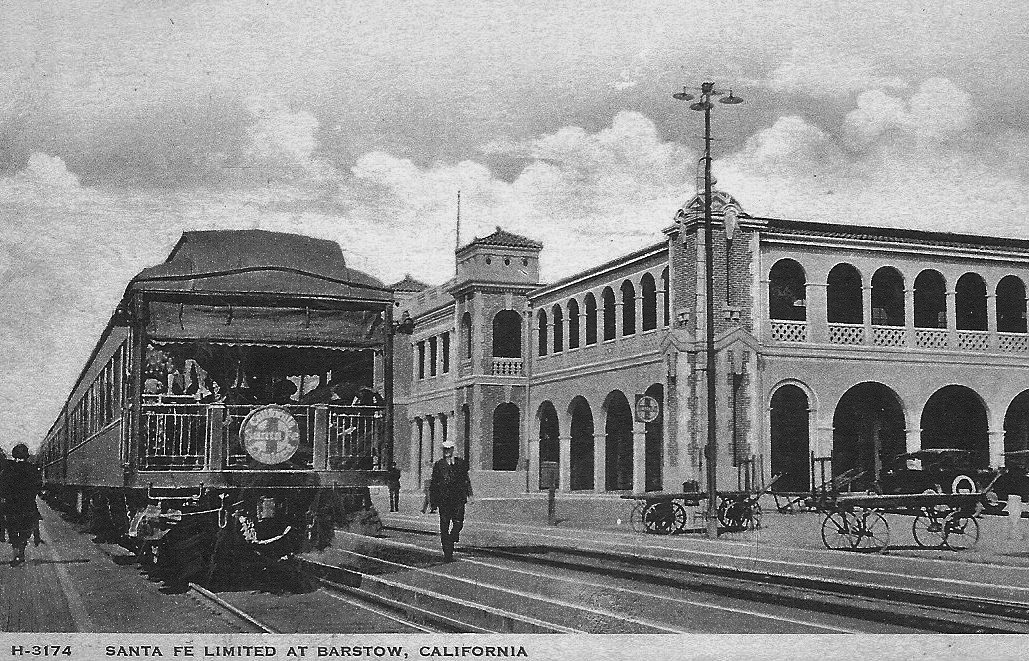
Santa Fe train arriving at the Casa del Desierto in 1926

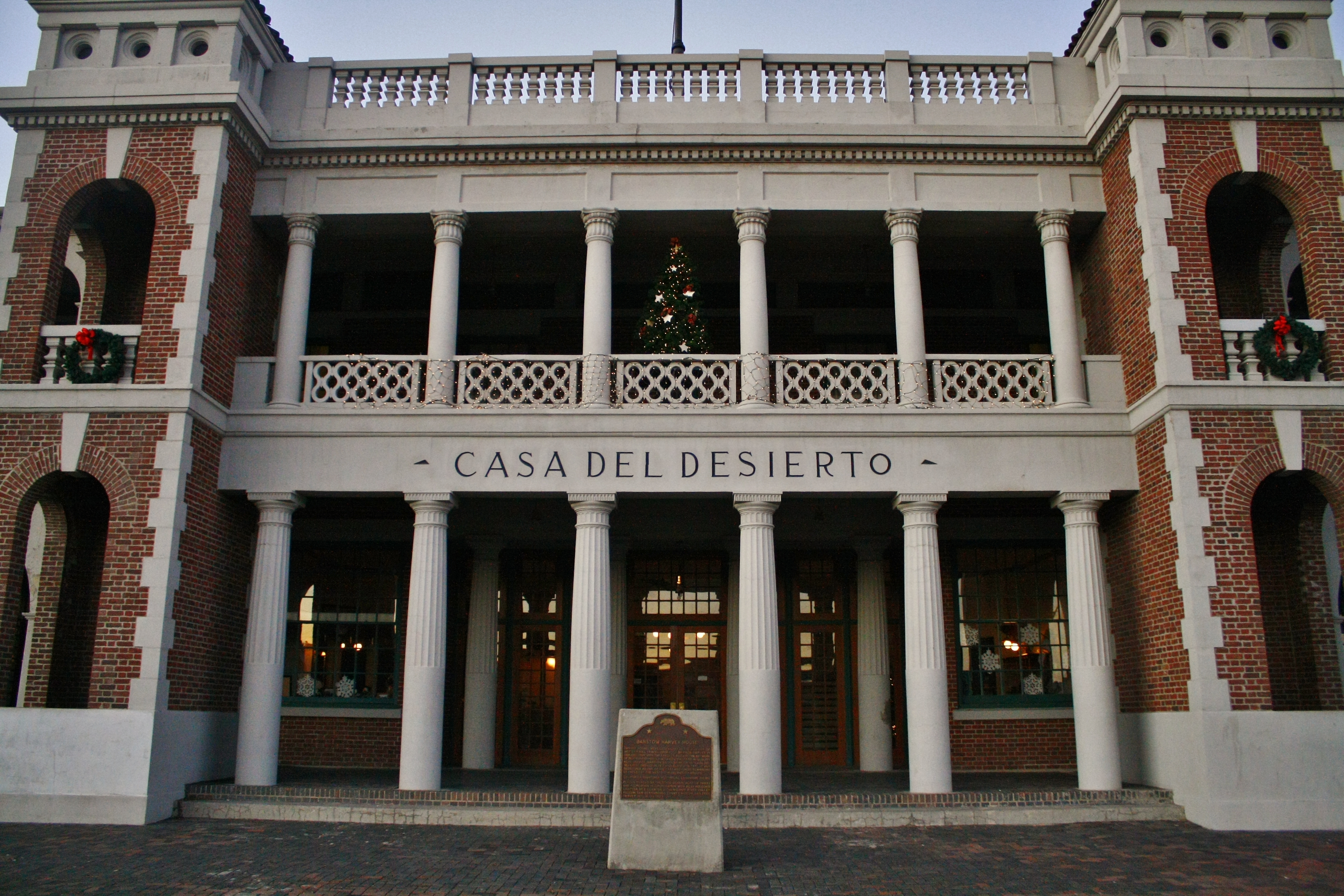
The historic Casa del Desierto today

Prehistoric Native American tribes inhabited the region as long as 3,000 years ago. The Native Americans hunted, fished and gathered turquoise. The indigenous people left hardly any discernible footprints along faint pathways as they traveled up to the Mexican territory to trade goods. The written history of the Mojave Valley dates back to the 1700s and the missionary excursions of Spanish Franciscan friar Francisco Garcés. Garcés followed the earliest faint footpaths to the Mojave River Valley and from there across the desert around Barstow on his way to Spanish missions beyond the mountains of California.

The settlement of Barstow began in the late 1840s in the Mormon Corridor. Every fall and winter, as the weather cooled, the rain produced new grass growth and replenished the water sources in the Mojave Desert. People, goods, and animal herds would move from New Mexico and later Utah to Los Angeles, along the Old Spanish Trail from Santa Fe, or after 1848, on the Mormon Road from Salt Lake City. Trains of freight wagons traveled back to Salt Lake City and other points in the interior. These travelers followed the course of the Mojave River, watering and camping at Fish Ponds on its south bank (west of Nebo Center) or 3.625 miles up river on the north bank, at a riverside grove of willows and cottonwoods, festooned with wild grapes, called Grapevines (later the site of North Barstow). In 1859, the Mojave Road followed a route that was established from Los Angeles to Fort Mojave through Grapevines that linked eastward with the Beale Wagon Road across northern New Mexico Territory to Santa Fe.

Troubles with the Paiute, Mojave, and Chemehuevi tribes followed, and from 1860 Camp Cady, a U.S. Army post 20 miles (32 km) east of Barstow, was occupied sporadically until 1864, then permanently, by soldiers occupying other posts on the Mojave Road or patrolling in the region until 1871. Trading posts were established at Grapevines and Fish Ponds that supplied travelers on the roads and increasingly the miners that came into the Mojave Desert after the end of hostilities with the native people.

Barstow's roots also lie in the rich mining history of the Mojave Desert following the discovery of gold and silver in the Owens Valley and in mountains to the east in the 1860s and 1870s. Due to the influx of miners arriving in Calico and Daggett, railroads were constructed to transport goods and people. The Southern Pacific built a line from Mojave, California through Barstow to Needles in 1883. In 1884, ownership of the line from Needles to Mojave was transferred to the Santa Fe Railroad.

Paving the major highways through Barstow led to further development of the city. Much of its economy depends on transportation. Before the advent of the interstate highway system, Barstow was an important stop on both Routes 66 and 91. The two routes met in downtown Barstow and continued west together to Los Angeles. The intersection of U.S. Route 91 and U.S. Route 466 was among the busiest intersections in the country—with about 800 U.S. gallons (3,000 L; 670 imp gal) of gasoline being pumped per day nearby, during the year before Interstate 40 was extended to bypass Barstow. By the end of the 20th century, U.S. Routes 40, 91, and 466 were renamed or truncated as to no longer cover California and Nevada—with Interstates 15 and 40 now being the main interstate highways going in and out of Barstow.

Barstow is named after William Barstow Strong, former president of the Atchison, Topeka and Santa Fe Railway. Some early Barstow names were Camp Sugarloaf, Grapevine, Waterman Junction and Fishpond.

== Geography ==
According to the United States Census Bureau, the city has a total area of 107.2 km^{2} (41.4 sq mi), 99.98% land and 0.02% water.

=== Climate ===
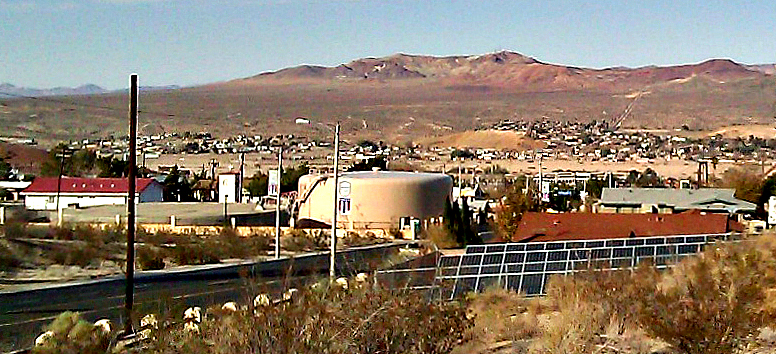
View of Barstow

Barstow experiences an arid climate, and has four seasons. Summer days are very hot, with highs typically exceeding 100 °F (37.8 °C). Winter, in contrast, is characterized by cold mornings, with lows near 30 °F (−1.1 °C). Daily temperature ranges are largely a result of the low atmospheric moisture, typically between 25 and 30 °F (14 and 17 °C) difference. There are an average of 133 days with highs of 90 °F (32.2 °C) or higher, an average of 68 days with highs of 100 °F (37.8 °C) or higher, and an average of 32 days with lows of 32 °F (0 °C) or lower.

The average annual precipitation is 4.96 inches (126 mm), with nearly 80% of rain typically falling during the cooler months (Nov–Apr). Snowfall is uncommon in winter, and many years can go by without any measurable snowfall. There are an average of 24 days annually with measurable precipitation.

The record high was 120 °F (48.9 °C) on July 23, 1996, and the record low was 3 °F (−16.1 °C) on January 13, 1963. The wettest year was 1918 with 10.99 inches (279.1 mm) and the driest year was 1904 with 0.80 inches (20.3 mm). The most rainfall in one month was 4.22 inches (107.2 mm) in February 1998. The heaviest rainfall in 24 hours was 2.28 inches (57.9 mm) on September 10, 1976. The most snowfall in one month was 25 inches (64 cm) in January 1949, including 7 inches (18 cm) on January 12; that month was one of the coldest and snowiest in Southern California history.

Climate data for Barstow, California, 1991–2020 normals, extremes 1903–present
Month	Jan	Feb	Mar	Apr	May	Jun	Jul	Aug	Sep	Oct	Nov	Dec	Year
Record high °F (°C)	83 (28)	87 (31)	93 (34)	99 (37)	107 (42)	114 (46)	120 (49)	113 (45)	113 (45)	102 (39)	91 (33)	86 (30)	120 (49)
Mean daily maximum °F (°C)	59.0 (15.0)	62.8 (17.1)	69.7 (20.9)	76.9 (24.9)	85.7 (29.8)	96.0 (35.6)	102.1 (38.9)	101.0 (38.3)	93.3 (34.1)	80.9 (27.2)	67.5 (19.7)	57.4 (14.1)	79.4 (26.3)
Daily mean °F (°C)	47.1 (8.4)	51.1 (10.6)	57.0 (13.9)	63.1 (17.3)	71.3 (21.8)	80.5 (26.9)	86.9 (30.5)	85.7 (29.8)	78.3 (25.7)	66.8 (19.3)	54.5 (12.5)	46.2 (7.9)	65.7 (18.7)
Mean daily minimum °F (°C)	35.3 (1.8)	39.4 (4.1)	44.2 (6.8)	49.4 (9.7)	56.9 (13.8)	65.0 (18.3)	71.8 (22.1)	70.4 (21.3)	63.3 (17.4)	52.6 (11.4)	41.6 (5.3)	34.9 (1.6)	52.1 (11.2)
Record low °F (°C)	3 (−16)	11 (−12)	19 (−7)	28 (−2)	34 (1)	40 (4)	48 (9)	48 (9)	32 (0)	21 (−6)	14 (−10)	8 (−13)	3 (−16)
Average precipitation inches (mm)	0.76 (19)	0.98 (25)	0.59 (15)	0.30 (7.6)	0.06 (1.5)	0.04 (1.0)	0.26 (6.6)	0.17 (4.3)	0.25 (6.4)	0.35 (8.9)	0.40 (10)	0.80 (20)	4.96 (126)
Average snowfall inches (cm)	0.0 (0.0)	trace	0.0 (0.0)	0.0 (0.0)	0.0 (0.0)	0.0 (0.0)	0.0 (0.0)	0.0 (0.0)	0.0 (0.0)	0.0 (0.0)	0.0 (0.0)	0.3 (0.76)	0.3 (0.76)
Average precipitation days (≥ 0.01 in)	3.9	4.2	2.6	1.3	0.8	0.2	1.5	0.9	0.8	1.1	1.6	3.0	21.9
Average snowy days (≥ 0.01 in)	0.0	0.1	0.0	0.0	0.0	0.0	0.0	0.0	0.0	0.0	0.0	0.1	0.2
Source: NOAA/WRCC (1903–1980 records)

=== Vegetation ===
The native vegetation is dominated by high and low desert shrubs such as creosote bush. City residents have introduced many non-native plants, prominent among which are trees such as Aleppo pine, Morus alba, Italian cypress, fan palm, ailanthus, ash, palo verde and redbud.

== Demographics ==
Historical population
Census	Pop.	Note	%±
1950	6,135		—
1960	11,644		89.8%
1970	17,442		49.8%
1980	17,690		1.4%
1990	21,472		21.4%
2000	21,119		−1.6%
2010	22,639		7.2%
2020	25,415		12.3%
2025 (est.)	24,804	▼	−2.4%
U.S. Decennial Census

=== Racial and ethnic composition ===
Barstow city, California – Racial and ethnic composition Note: the US Census treats Hispanic/Latino as an ethnic category. This table excludes Latinos from the racial categories and assigns them to a separate category. Hispanics/Latinos may be of any race.
Race / Ethnicity (NH = Non-Hispanic)	Pop 2000	Pop 2010	Pop 2020	% 2000	% 2010	% 2020
White alone (NH)	9,163	7,746	6,646	43.39%	34.22%	26.15%
Black or African American alone (NH)	2,349	3,132	4,684	11.12%	13.83%	18.43%
Native American or Alaska Native alone (NH)	369	260	305	1.75%	1.15%	1.20%
Asian alone (NH)	624	659	696	2.95%	2.91%	2.74%
Native Hawaiian or Pacific Islander alone (NH)	186	249	312	0.88%	1.10%	1.23%
Other race alone (NH)	44	24	143	0.21%	0.11%	0.56%
Mixed race or Multiracial (NH)	676	869	1,334	3.20%	3.84%	5.25%
Hispanic or Latino (any race)	7,708	9,700	11,295	36.50%	42.85%	44.44%
Total	21,119	22,639	25,415	100.00%	100.00%	100.00%

=== 2020 census ===
As of the 2020 census, Barstow had a population of 25,415 and a population density of 615.4 inhabitants per square mile (237.6/km^{2}). The census reported that 93.6% of residents lived in urban areas and 6.4% lived in rural areas.

31.0% of residents were under the age of 18, 9.7% were aged 18 to 24, 26.3% were aged 25 to 44, 20.9% were aged 45 to 64, and 12.0% were 65 years of age or older; the median age was 30.9 years. For every 100 females there were 94.3 males, and for every 100 females age 18 and over there were 89.8 males age 18 and over. The census reported that 98.7% of the population lived in households, 0.8% lived in non-institutionalized group quarters, and 0.4% were institutionalized.

There were 8,790 households, of which 40.4% had children under the age of 18 living in them. Of all households, 33.9% were married-couple households, 9.2% were cohabiting couple households, 22.2% were households with a male householder and no spouse or partner present, and 34.7% were households with a female householder and no spouse or partner present. About 26.0% of all households were made up of individuals and 9.8% had someone living alone who was 65 years of age or older. The average household size was 2.85. There were 5,970 families (67.9% of all households).

There were 9,620 housing units at an average density of 232.9 units per square mile (89.9 units/km^{2}), of which 8.6% were vacant and 91.4% were occupied. Of the occupied units, 43.8% were owner-occupied and 56.2% were occupied by renters. The homeowner vacancy rate was 2.1%, and the rental vacancy rate was 7.8%.

Racial composition as of the 2020 census
Race	Number	Percentage
White	9,464	37.2%
Black or African American	4,965	19.5%
American Indian and Alaska Native	689	2.7%
Asian	742	2.9%
Native Hawaiian and Other Pacific Islander	346	1.4%
Some other race	4,962	19.5%
Two or more races	4,247	16.7%

=== 2023 estimates ===
In 2023, the US Census Bureau estimated that 9.9% of the population were foreign-born. Of all people aged 5 or older, 75.4% spoke only English at home, 21.7% spoke Spanish, 0.4% spoke other Indo-European languages, 2.0% spoke Asian or Pacific Islander languages, and 0.4% spoke other languages. Of those aged 25 or older, 83.8% were high school graduates and 11.1% had a bachelor's degree.

The median household income was $51,811, and the per capita income was $25,531. About 18.3% of families and 23.2% of the population were below the poverty line.

== Arts and culture ==
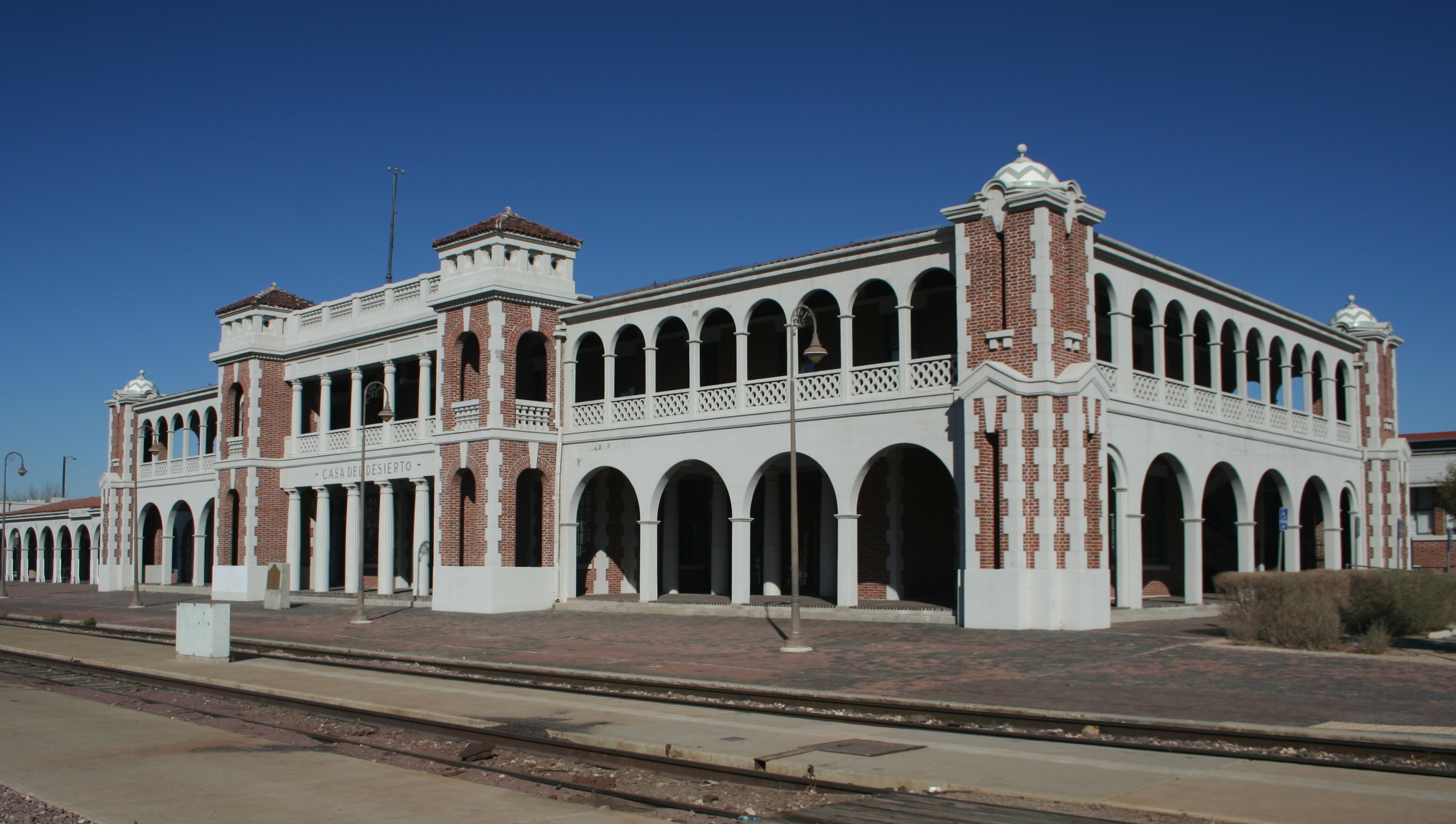
The historic Casa del Desierto, originally built as a hotel by the Fred Harvey Company

Barstow has a series of murals along Main Street, depicting scenes from the city's history. These murals were created by Main Street Murals, a local non-profit organization.

Barstow Branch Library is located at 304 E. Buena Vista Street. It is a community venue, running various activities such as a summer reading program for children, story and craft sessions as well as a mystery book club.

=== Entertainment ===
Skyline Drive-In, a drive-in theater located in the northeast outskirts of the city at 31175 Old Highway 58, is one of the last operating in San Bernardino County. It has two screens; each screen shows two movies nightly during operating season.

Barstow Station Cinema is D'Place is the city's indoor cinema. It has six screens and can be found at 1503 East Main Street, in the east side of the city.

Barstow Community College has a $22 million Performing Arts Center which hosts college theatre and music performances, and traveling professional performances.

=== Museums ===
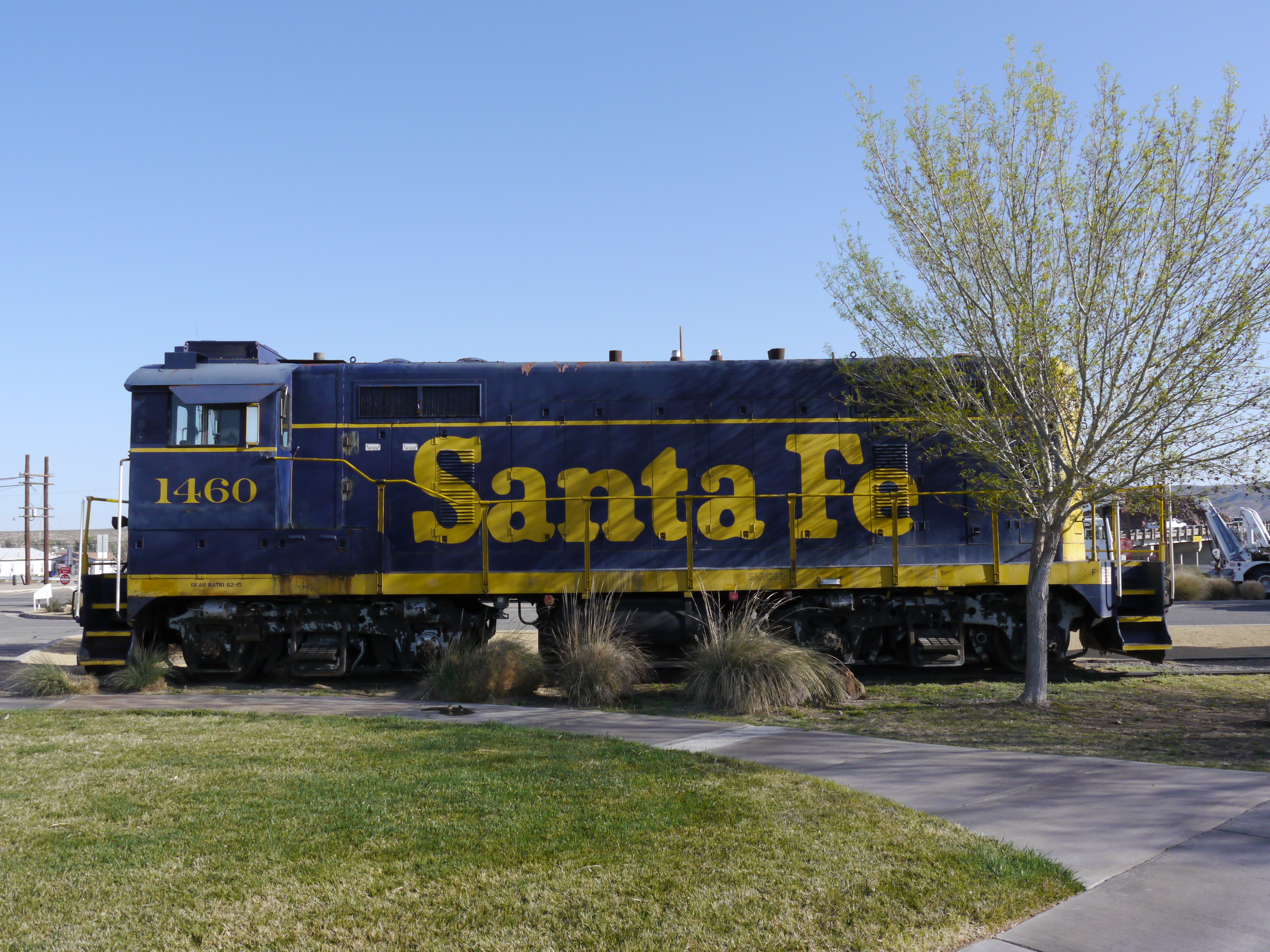
Western America Rail Museum exhibit

Barstow has a number of museums: Mojave River Valley Museum, Route 66 Mother Road Museum, the Western America Rail Museum, and the Desert Discovery Center.

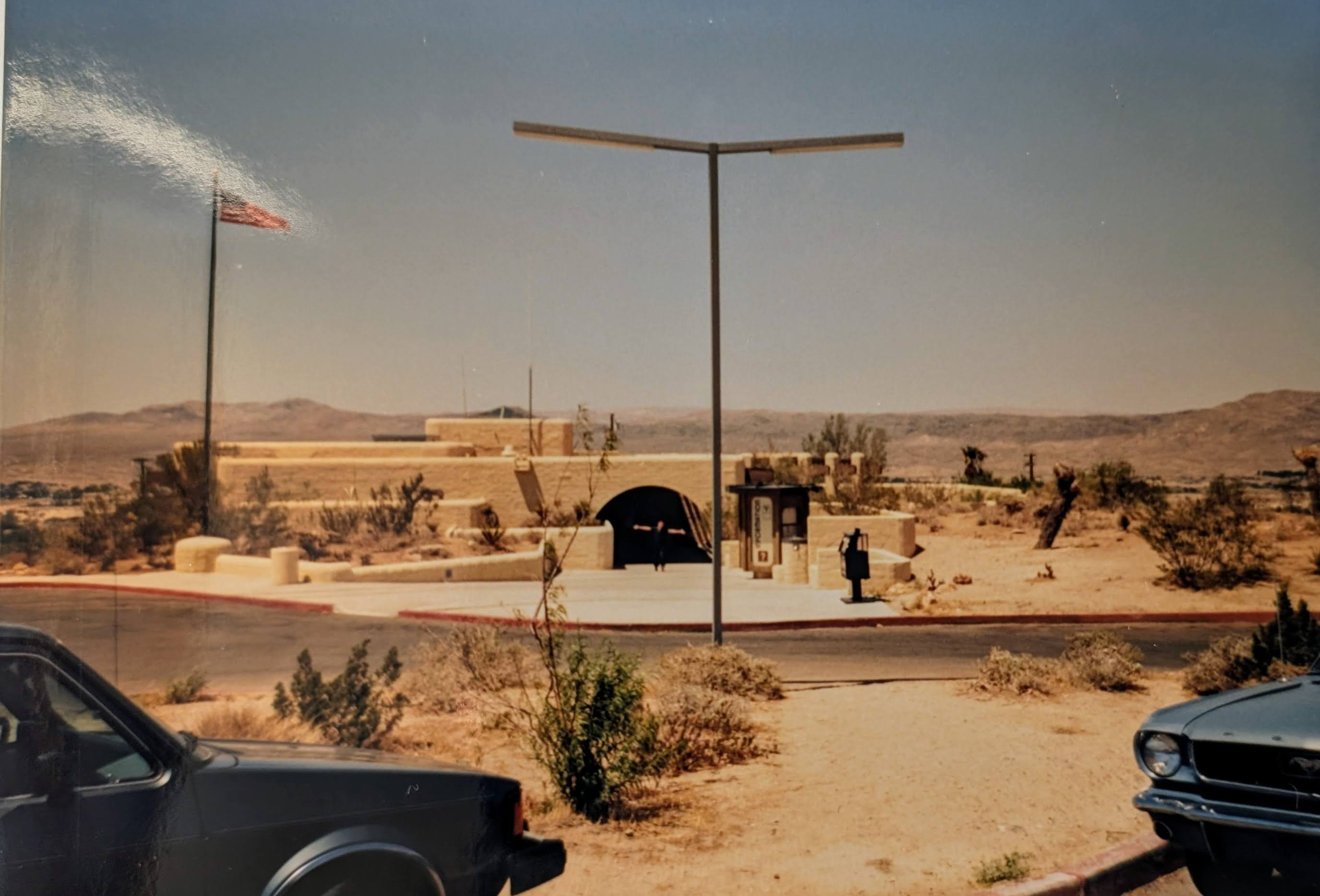
Desert Discovery Center Barstow in 1988

Once a year a family opens their Black History collection to the public and nearby Fort Irwin is home to the 11 Cavalry and ACR Museum. The Old Woman meteorite, the largest meteorite found in California and the second largest in the United States, is housed in the Desert Discovery Center.

The Casa Del Desierto, built in 1911 as a Harvey House hotel and train station, now houses the Route 66 Mother Road Museum, the Western America Railroad Museum, and still functions as an (unstaffed) Amtrak station. The Barstow Chamber of Commerce sponsors an annual sandcastle contest in the dry riverbed across from the Harvey House.

==== Barstow Station ====
Opened in 1975 and operating 365 days a year, Barstow Station is built to resemble a railway station. The location serves 20,000 tour buses a year and is a popular stop for travelers on Interstate 15. It includes a number of gift and fast food shops, an ice cream parlor, KHWY radio station, and a Greyhound ticket terminal.

The McDonald's restaurant at Barstow Station consists of three side-by-side railroad cars—a reference to Barstow's railroad heritage. In September 1986, the restaurant was destroyed by fire when a customer's car burst into flames at the drive-up window. In June 1997, the rebuilt restaurant received national attention when a gunman opened fire during a botched robbery, injuring several people and killing a nine-year-old girl. The gunman was mortally wounded by an off-duty police officer after the ensuing gun battle and later died in a hospital.

=== Retail ===
Located southwest of the town is the upscale Outlets at Barstow, which is a popular stop for tourists traveling between Greater Los Angeles and Las Vegas. An older shopping center of outlet stores, the Barstow Outlets (formerly Factory Merchants at Barstow), is located opposite of the Outlets at Barstow, but has since closed.

The city has an enclosed shopping mall, Barstow Mall, built in the 1970s. It was renovated in 2010 and now includes the County of San Bernardino's new social service office for the Transition Assistance Department and Children and Family Services.

=== Near Barstow ===
The United States Army's National Training Center (NTC) and NASA's Goldstone Deep Space Communications Complex are located at the nearby Fort Irwin, north of Barstow. The Goldstone Complex includes the Pioneer Deep Space Station, which has been designated a U.S. National Historic Landmark.

Calico Ghost Town is one of the few remaining original mining towns of the western United States, now preserved as a museum by Walter Knott.

Rainbow Basin is an Area of Critical Environmental Concern due to landscape features and paleontological resources in the area. Located 8 miles (13 km) north of Barstow, its landscape, multi-colored rock formations and canyons are visited by photographers, hikers, and campers. The fossiliferous Barstow Formation (Miocene) is well exposed there. Rainbow Basin is managed by the Bureau of Land Management's Barstow Field Office.

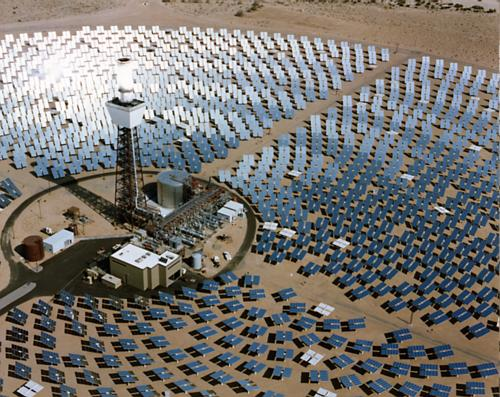
The Solar Project

Coyote Dry Lake is a 30-square-mile (78 km^{2}) dry lake located 15 miles (24 km) northeast of Barstow.

Lava tubes around Pisgah Crater offer spelunking opportunities.

The Solar Project is located in Daggett, CA, about 10 miles (16 km) east of Barstow.

== Sports ==
Barstow was home to the Barstow Riffians, a developmental semi-professional football team. The Barstow Riffians were members of the UFAL. The team ceased operations following the 2010–11 season.

The city offers adult basketball and softball leagues.

Barstow Community College's athletics department offers seven competitive intercollegiate sports programs: baseball, men's and women's basketball, men's and women's cross country, softball and volleyball.

== Parks and recreation ==
Barstow has two main parks: the Barstow Skate Park, a 12,000-square-foot (1,100 m^{2}) skate park, and the Robert A. Sessions Memorial Sportspark, which includes six lighted ball fields, three soccer fields, volleyball courts, batting cages as well as basketball courts. The Robert A. Sessions Memorial Sportspark also plays host to regional softball tournaments.

The city also has the Dana Park Community Center open on weekdays, the Cora Harper Fitness Center and Tennis Courts open Monday to Saturday, and the outdoor Eda Henderson Pool open Tuesdays to Sundays throughout the school summer holidays.

Founded in the 1970s by two local residents, the thriving Barstow Senior Center serves Barstow's seniors. In addition to daily, weekly, and monthly activities, and lunches are served every weekday. The center is funded via annual membership fees and sponsorship.

== Government ==
=== Local government ===
According to the city's most recent Comprehensive Annual Financial Report, the city's various funds had $33.1 million in revenues, $37.2 million in expenditures, $149.8 million in total assets, $25.3 million in total liabilities, and $52.6 million in cash and investments. The structure of the management and coordination of city services is:

The Barstow Youth Advisory Council (BYAC) was established in March 2009. Thirteen teen advocates advise Barstow City Council members on the needs of young people in the city and promote youth community involvement through voluntary activities.

=== State and federal representation ===
In the California State Legislature, Barstow is in the 19th senatorial district, represented by Republican Rosilicie Ochoa Bogh, and in the 34th Assembly district, represented by Republican Tom Lackey.

In the United States House of Representatives, Barstow is in California's 23rd congressional district, represented by Republican Jay Obernolte.

== Economy ==
Tourist accommodation in Barstow

Its long distance from larger cities and urban centers has created economic problems, and Barstow is seeking projects to boost the economy. However, there are three casinos planned for the area. Additionally, various construction projects have been announced for Barstow, which include retail growth, an increase in lodging accommodation, and other businesses.

In October 2022, BNSF committed to expanding the Barstow Rail yard into the Barstow International Gateway, over 4,500 acres (1,800 ha) at a cost of $1.5 billion to reduce dwell time at the Port of Los Angeles. In response, the city adopted a new logo and changed its motto to "the Hub of the West". It is also in the process of changing zoning to accommodate the logistics industry that surrounds the expanded BNSF facility.

=== Top employers ===
According to the city's 2025 Annual Comprehensive Financial Report, the top employers in the area were:

Rank	Employer	No. of Employees
1	Ft. Irwin National Training Center	8,451
2	Marine Corps Logistics Base	1,935
3	BNSF Railroad	1,000
4	Barstow Unified School District	750
5	Outlets at Barstow	450
6	Raytheon Technical Services	393
7	Barstow Community Hospital	360
7	Barstow Community College	309
9	Walmart	305
10	Silver Valley Unified School District	301

== Education ==
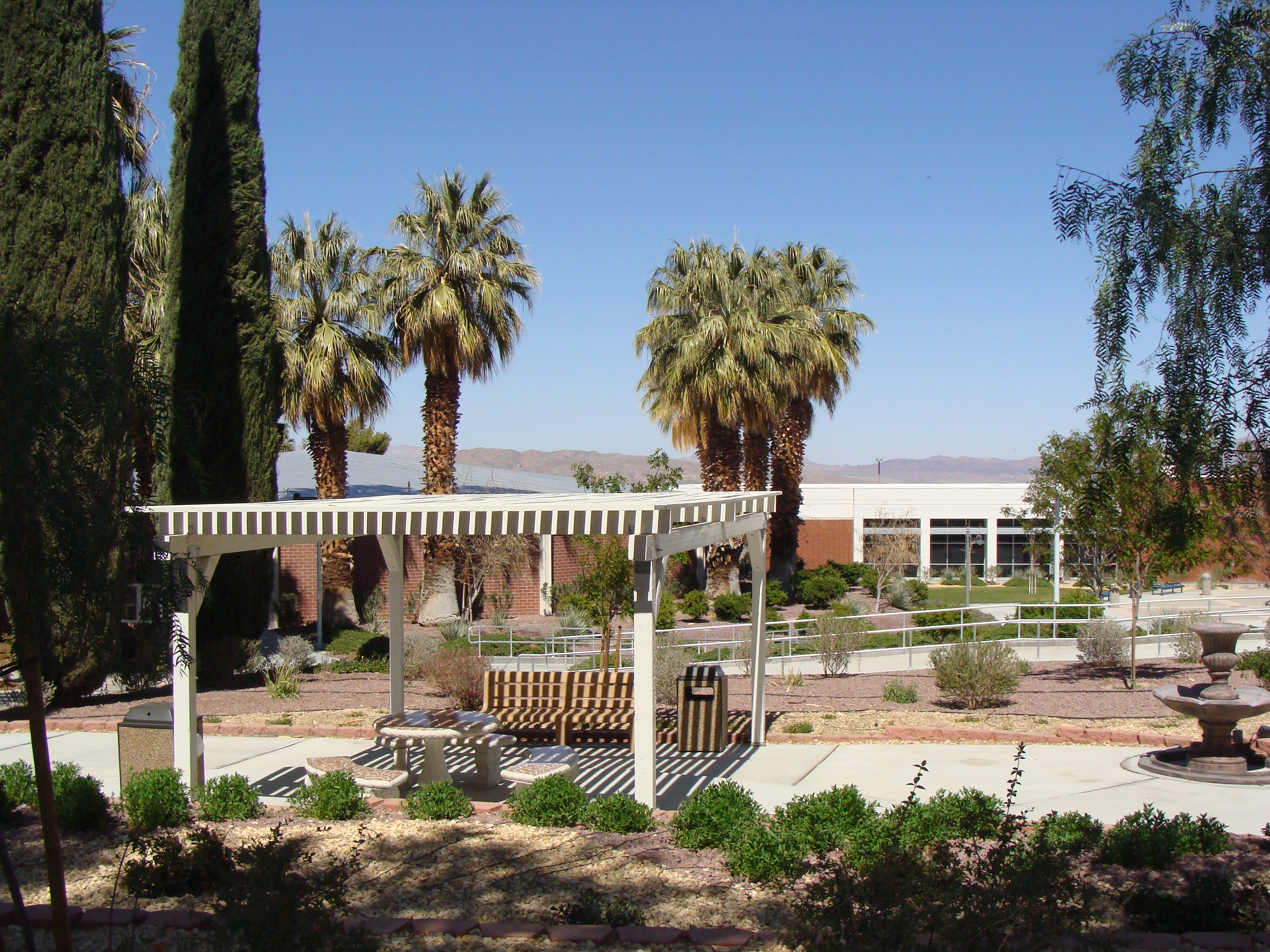
Barstow Community College

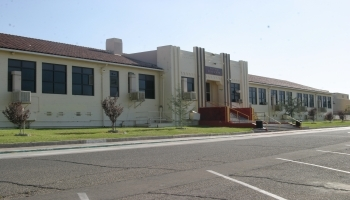
Barstow High School

Barstow Unified School District has eight elementary schools (grades 1–6):

Currently operating:

- Cameron Elementary School
- Crestline Elementary School
- Henderson Elementary School
- Lenwood Elementary School
- Montara Elementary School
- Skyline North Elementary School
- Thomson Elementary School (now Barstow Stem Academy)

Grades 7–8 are taught at Barstow Junior High School and grades 9–12 are taught at Barstow High School.

Charter Schools:

- Excelsior Charter Schools 7th–12th
- Mojave River Academy K-12

Barstow Community College is the only college in the area, and its primary objectives are to enable students to transfer to a four-year college or university and learn vocational trades through career technical education.

Park University has a campus located at the Marine Corps logistics base, which accepts local civilian students as well as military personnel and their dependents. Park also offers classes on the community college campus.

Closed schools:

- Hinkley Elementary School (Hinkley, California. Now closed)

== Media ==
=== Newspaper, books, and radio ===
The town's local newspaper was established in 1910 as the Barstow Printer. It became the Desert Dispatch in 1958, and was merged into the Victorville Daily Press in 2017.

Barstow's main radio station is KDUC (or "K-DUCK"), which plays adult contemporary music and also serves Victorville, Apple Valley, Hesperia and Ridgecrest, California.

"We were somewhere around Barstow on the edge of the desert when the drugs began to take hold" is the opening sentence of Hunter S. Thompson's Fear and Loathing in Las Vegas.

=== Movies and television ===
Barstow City Council has a dedicated film office, which acts as a point of liaison and resources for film locations, equipment and accommodation for filmmakers and their crews. A number of notable motion pictures were shot in the city, including Broken Arrow, Courage Under Fire, From Dusk till Dawn, Gattaca, Erin Brockovich, and Kill Bill: Volume 2. Other notable mentions of Barstow include the 2008 film Leaving Barstow, which tells the story of a high school senior who must choose between his ambitions to leave Barstow or stay in the city to care for his mother. The fictional Brian O'Conner in 2 Fast 2 Furious grew up in Barstow and travels to the city to persuade a former childhood best friend Roman Pearce to join him in an FBI operation.

The film Fear and Loathing in Las Vegas mentions Barstow frequently.

Barstow is also mentioned in the 2009 film The Hangover before the road trip from Los Angeles to Las Vegas. The film version of Hair was partially filmed in Barstow in the late 1970s. Blinkey, cousin of popular 80's alien character ALF, is said to live in Barstow.

In 2015, Barstow was one of the filming locations for the film Sky as well as Bombay Beach, Hinkley, Joshua Tree, Landers, Lenwood, Ludlow, Newberry Springs, and Victorville, California.

Barstow is the topic of the documentary Barstow, California (2018) by German director Rainer Komers featuring voice overs of Spoon Jackson's poems and memoir By Heart.

Barstow was featured by Huell Howser in Road Trip Episode 101.

=== Music ===
"Barstow Cowboy in Old Barstow" was a 1941 song by comedian/musician Spike Jones.

Barstow is mentioned in the lyrics of "Route 66" composed by Bobby Troup.

Composer Harry Partch wrote "Barstow," inspired by eight pieces of graffiti written by hitchhikers on highway railings in the city.

The Residents' song "Death in Barstow" (1979) tells the story of two friends who visit and fall asleep in Barstow. One of the friends awakes to find that his friend has died.

Bill Morrissey's song "Barstow" (1984, the first song on his first record) is about a group of men drinking one night in a Barstow train yard, with the notable line "I can't believe it gets this cold in Barstow".

Sheryl Crow's "Leaving Las Vegas" mentions spending the night in Barstow.

Goodnight, Texas's song "Barstow" is a tale of a gold miner chasing his dream to the town, only to find that Barstow does not have any gold.

== Infrastructure ==
=== Transportation ===
Victor Valley Transit Authority is the local transportation system. It covers the city of Barstow and the surrounding areas in San Bernardino County. BAT operates three fixed city bus routes on an hourly schedule, a dial-a-ride service for seniors and persons with disabilities and two county routes serving Hinkley, Yermo, Daggett, and Newberry Springs. The county services operate on a fixed route with a deviation zone and a flexible time schedule. When requested in advance, the county bus travels off the fixed route to pick up or drop off passengers within the deviation zone. Unless passengers hold a monthly or day pass, there is an additional charge for this service. All city and county buses connect at Barstow City Hall Transport Center. Intercity buses that serve Barstow include Greyhound, Orange Belt Stages, Intercalifornias, TUFESA, and Fronteras del Norte, and FlixBus.

The Harvey House Railroad Depot is served twice daily by Amtrak's Southwest Chief, from Chicago to Los Angeles and reverse. Connections can also be made on multiple Amtrak Thruway bus services to Las Vegas and other destinations. Rail freight is provided by the BNSF Railway and the Union Pacific Railroad.

Barstow-Daggett Airport is the local airport that serves general aviation but has no commercial service.

Roads are the main method of transport. The primary arteries serving Barstow are Interstate 40 (western terminus), Interstate 15, and California State Route 58 (eastern terminus). A Tesla Supercharger station is available.

=== Healthcare ===
Barstow Community Hospital is a 56-bed hospital serving the surrounding High Desert community. Opened in 1958, the hospital was named one of the "100 Top Hospitals in the Nation" for two consecutive years in the late 1990s. The new Barstow Community Hospital, which opened its doors to the community in October 2012, is a 30-bed acute care facility with inpatient and outpatient services, and medical, surgical and emergency care.

=== Public safety ===
Barstow has its own police department, plus a regional station of the San Bernardino County Sheriff's Department, which serves the unincorporated areas around the city, including Newberry Springs, Trona, Baker and Ludlow. Fire prevention and paramedic services are provided by the Barstow Fire Protection District.

=== Cemetery ===
The Mountain View Memorial Park (also called Mt. View Cemetery), located on Irwin Road, was established in 1937; an Independent Special District for the cemetery was created in 1947 as Barstow Cemetery District. Notable burials include MLB pitcher Bob Rhoads. In 2021 the San Bernardino County Local Agency Formation Commission determined that the Cemetery District was fiscally unstable, Which triggered a special study about dissolving the cemetery district.

== Notable people ==
- Nick Barnett, former NFL player for Green Bay Packers and Washington Redskins
- Raquel Beezley, Miss California USA 2008
- Jeanne Crain, Academy Award-nominated film actress
- Dino Ebel, Major League Baseball coach
- Jeremy Gable, playwright
- T. J. Houshmandzadeh, former football player for Cincinnati Bengals and Seattle Seahawks
- Spoon Jackson, convicted murderer and poet
- Mark Johnson, golfer
- Byron Katie, author, speaker
- Joe A. Martinez, ring and cage announcer
- Michael Pelkey, founder of BASE Jumping
- Scott Reeder, drummer, Fu Manchu
- Stan Ridgway, musician, founder of Wall of Voodoo
- Ross Robinson, music producer
- Gloria J. Romero, former majority leader, California State Senate
- Paul Salopek, journalist
- Aaron Sanchez, MLB pitcher for San Francisco Giants, born in Barstow
- Rick Steves, author and television personality focusing on European travel

== See also ==
- Calico Ghost Town
- Death Valley National Park
- Lake Dolores Waterpark
- Marine Corps Logistics Base Barstow
- Mojave Desert
- Mojave National Preserve
- Harry Partch, Barstow: Eight Hitchhikers' Inscriptions
- Route 66
- The Solar Project
