= Newberry Mountains (California) =

Mountain range in California, United States

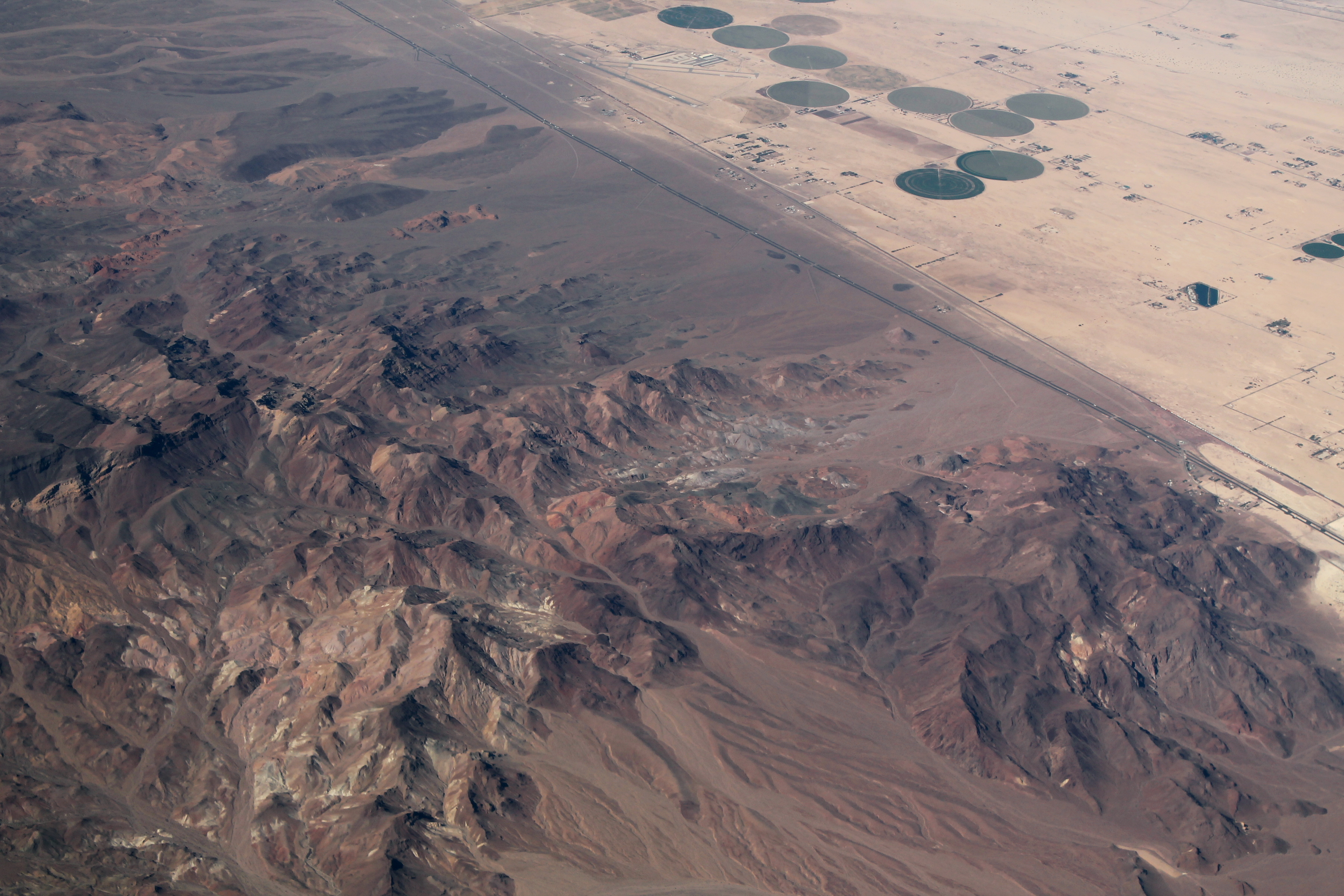
- Aerial view of the Newberry Mountains

Highest point
- Elevation: 1,217 m (3,993 ft)

Geography
- Location within California
- Country: United States
- State: California
- District: San Bernardino County
- Range coordinates: 34°46′29.963″N 116°43′33.114″W
- Topo map: USGS Newberry Springs

The Newberry Mountains of California are located southeast of Barstow in the Mojave Desert, in San Bernardino County, California. The Rodman Mountains lie to the southeast of the range, while the Ord Mountains lie to the southwest.

Historic U.S. Route 66 and contemporary Interstate 40, along with Newberry Springs, California are just to the north.

== Newberry Mountains Wilderness Area ==
The range is home to the Newberry Mountains Wilderness which consists of 26,102 acres. Established in 1994, the wilderness area is managed by the U.S. Bureau of Land Management. Elevations in the area range from 2,200 feet (670 m) to 5,100 feet (1554 m). The Azucar Mine is in the mountains also.
