= Orange Belt Stages =

Company based in the state of California, United States

- Founded: November 30, 1935
- Defunct: March 2020
- Headquarters: Visalia, California, U.S.

Orange Belt Stages was a bus company based in Visalia, California, affiliated with the Trailways Transportation System. The company was incorporated on November 30, 1935, and operated scheduled service in California as well as charter services. The company ceased operations in 2020 as a result of the impact of the COVID-19 pandemic on tourism.

== History ==
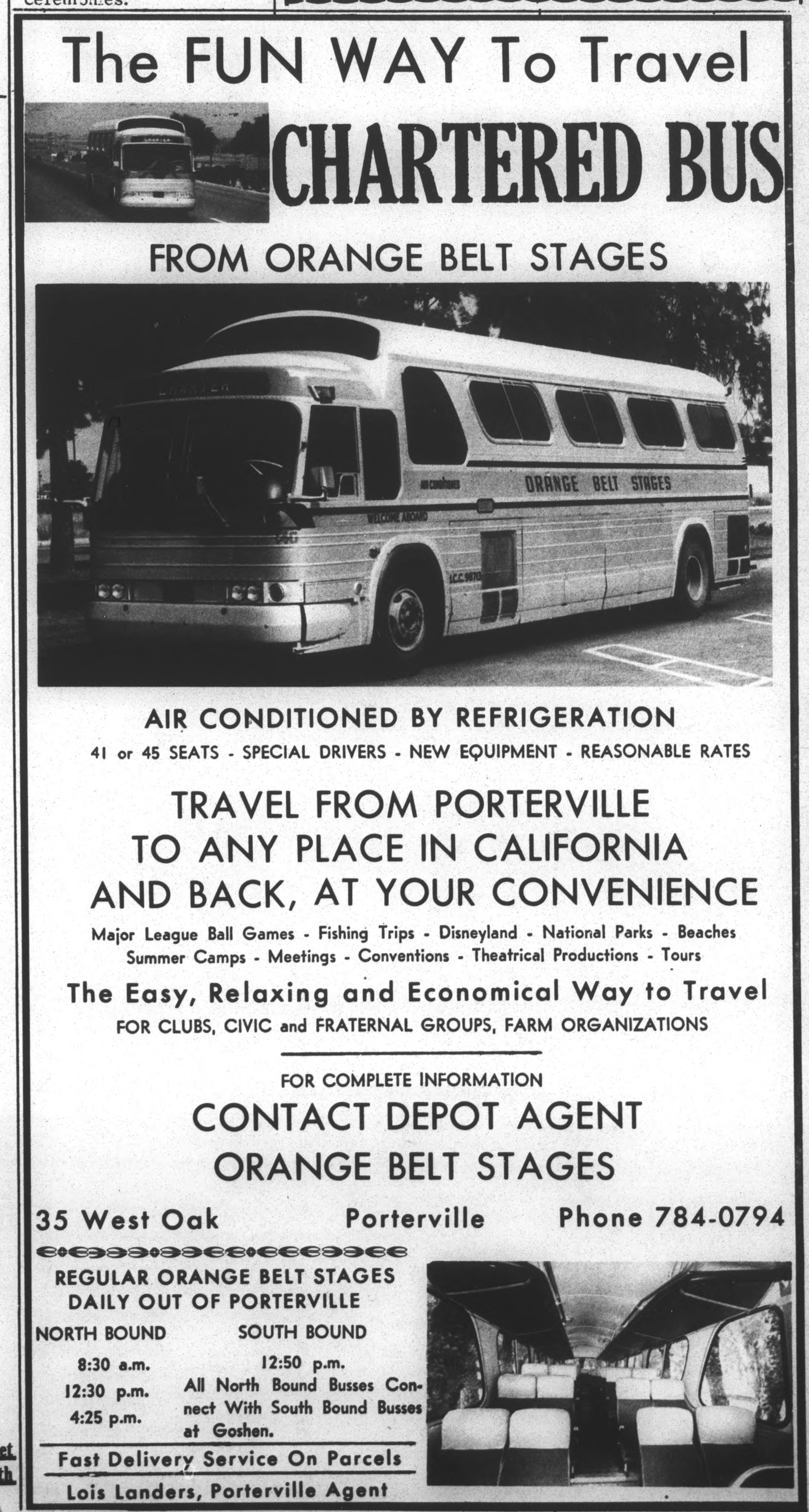
Advertisement for Orange Belt Stages in Porterville, California, 1967

The company began in 1916, when Cyril Haworth started a taxi service in Kern County, California, serving oil field workers in McKittrick, Taft, and Bakersfield. Pickwick Stage Lines leased its Bakersfield–Paso Robles route to Haworth in 1930, who was later granted the right to purchase the Delano–Exeter route (via Ducor, Porterville, and Terra Bella) and to start an Exeter–Hanford route (via Visalia) in 1933. The company was incorporated on November 30, 1935.

Cyril "Pop" Haworth had three sons; two assumed control of the company as partners in 1943: Thoburn (T.S.) and Bryan (B.W.). Cyril retired in 1952 but continued to drive buses. By 1955, OBS was serving routes totaling 400 mi (640 km). Thoburn ran the Visalia branch while Bryan ran the Bakersfield branch until he was bought out in the mid 1970s. Thoburn's son Michael has run the company from Visalia since 1985. The headquarters was in Visalia with branches in Fresno and Bakersfield.

The name Orange Belt Stages came from the route along the foothills of the Sierra Nevada mountains, where lush groves of oranges are found.

In May 1969, a bus carrying a group of Girl Scouts from Universal Studios back to Bakersfield crashed and killed 3 young girls and injured twelve.

The company owned Orange Belt Adventures, a travel agency offering tours and charters.

In 2016, they partnered with CSU Bakersfield Athletics to be the official charter company of the school's teams.

Orange Belt Stages previously ran a route from Visalia to Las Vegas; the route was cancelled in 2017.

Orange Belt Stages operated scheduled routes as part of both the Trailways Transportation System and the Amtrak Thruway system.

The company ceased operations in 2020 as a result of the impact of the COVID-19 pandemic on tourism.
