= Newberry Springs, California =

Unincorporated community in California, United States

- Unincorporated community
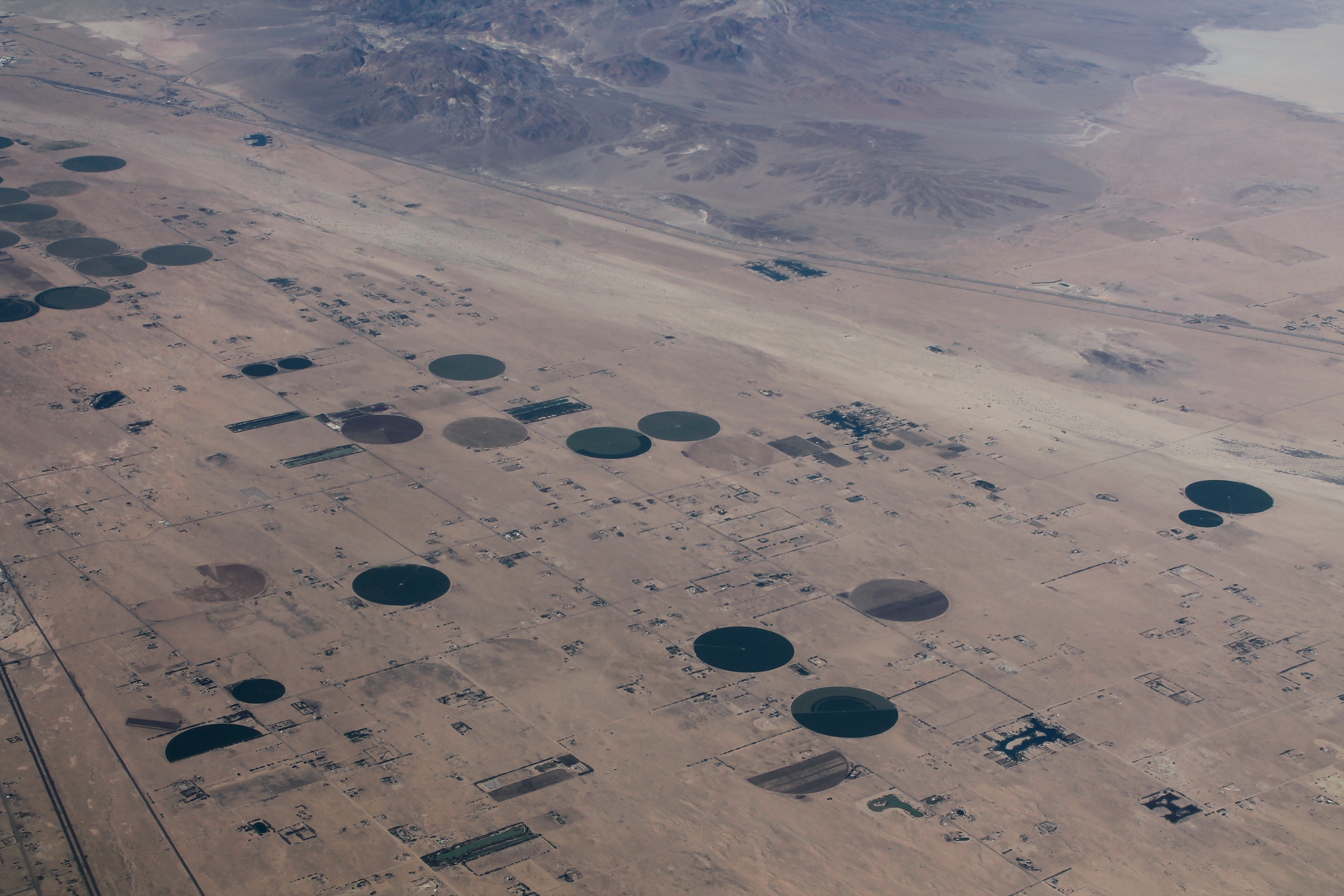
- Aerial view of Newberry Springs

- Location within the state of California Newberry Springs, California (the United States)
- Coordinates: 34°49′40″N 116°41′15″W
- Country: United States
- State: California
- County: San Bernardino
- Founded: 1911

Population (2000)
  - Total: 2,895
- Time zone: UTC-8 (Pacific (PST))
  - Summer (DST): UTC-7 (PDT)
- ZIP codes: 92365
- Area codes: 442 and 760

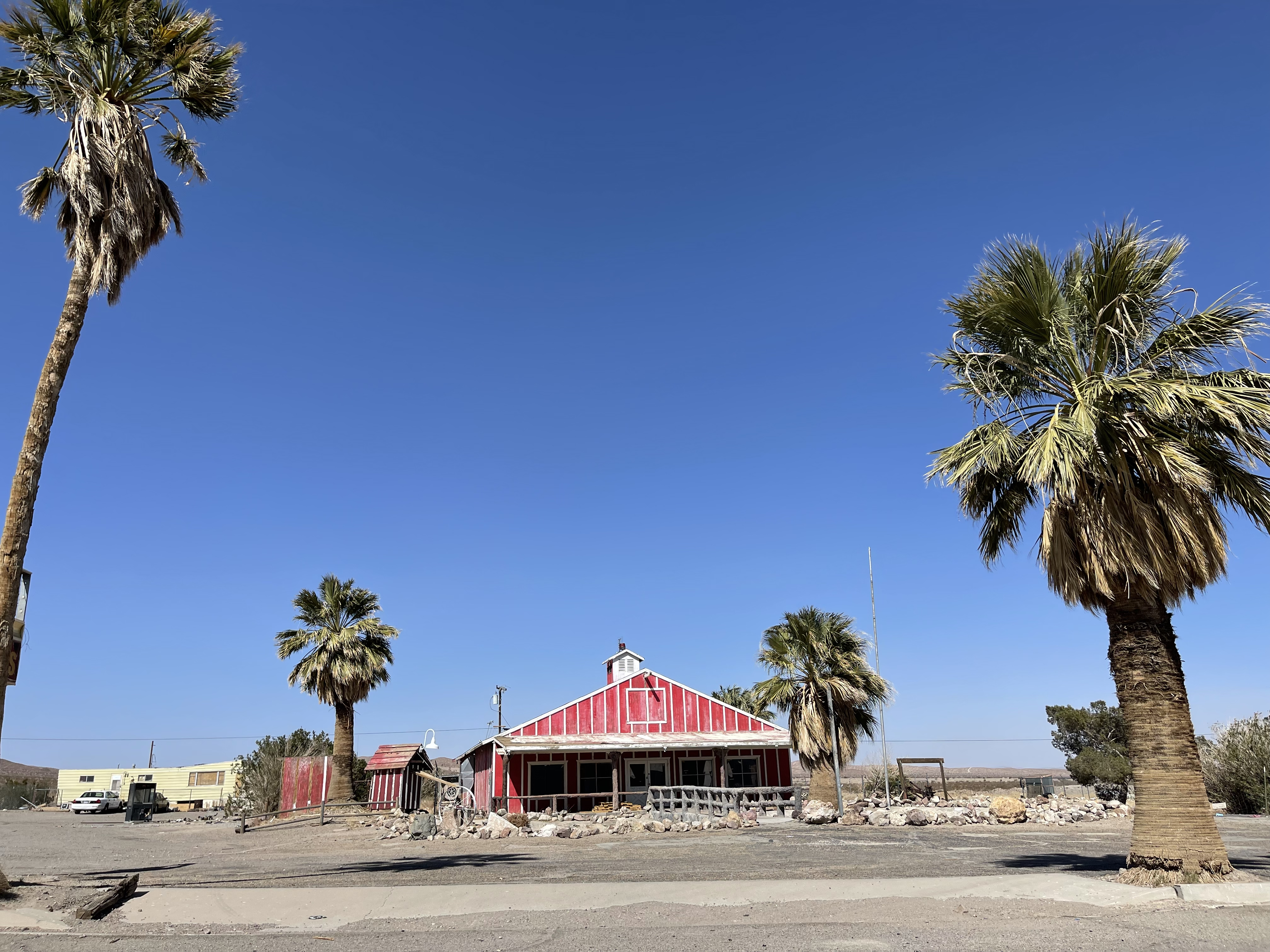
Newberry Springs in 2022

Newberry Springs is an unincorporated community in the western Mojave Desert of Southern California, located at the foot of the Newberry Mountains in San Bernardino County, California, United States. Newberry Spring is a spring that in the 19th century supplied water to the local Santa Fe Railway and originally was a camping place. The population at the 2000 census was 2,895.

== Geography and climate ==
Newberry Springs is located 20 mi (32 km) east of Barstow, approximately 40 mi (64 km) due west of the Mojave National Preserve, and approximately 100 mi (160 km) south of Death Valley National Park. The town is 117 sq mi (300 km^{2}) in area. It is approximately 2,000 ft (610 m) above sea level.

The region maintains an average daytime summer temperature of 107 °F (42 °C). In the winter, lows generally get into the 20s, with a dry, cold climate, the immediate area receiving less than 10 in (250 mm) of rain per year.

Newberry Springs is a typical desert oasis. Ancient volcanic rock formations, lava beds, sand dunes, mineral springs, and hidden mud baths are found in the area.

The area is irrigated by the Mojave Aquifer, the largest aquifer in the Western United States, which makes possible a diverse and abundant agriculture and a number of man-made lakes.

== Transportation ==
Interstates 15 and 40 run through the area. BNSF Railway's transcontinental main line and historic Route 66 both run through the town.

== History ==
The original name of Newberry Springs was, at least briefly, "Watson", with a post office established in Feb 1883, and discontinued later that year in July. The Southern Pacific Railroad then named the location "Newberry", and eventually the post office was re-established under that name in 1899. In 1911 the post office name was changed to "Wagner", and in 1919 to "Water". At some point prior to 1931 the name was changed back to "Newberry", and in 1967 to "Newberry Springs", apparently to avoid confusion with Newbury Park (near Oxnard CA). Since its earliest days the area in and around Newberry Springs has been a source of water for the surrounding arid region. Camp Cady, located at the western terminus of the Mojave Road just 12 miles north of present-day Newberry Springs, was a resting place and watering hole along the Mojave River for wagon trains coming to California in the 1850s on the old Mormon Trail. In the 1880s the Atlantic and Pacific Railroad hauled tank cars of water from Newberry Springs to the stations and towns in the region, making life in this arid land possible.

== Agriculture ==
The climate in Newberry Springs is relatively mild and supports many crops, including pistachios, apricots and alfalfa. Newberry Springs has farms and ranches, which produce ostrich, horse, buffalo, duck, turkey, catfish, and koi.

== Government ==
The community of Newberry Springs is governed by the Newberry Community Services District, which provides parks and firefighting services

== Recreation ==
Water skiing is important to the area. Newberry Springs contains some man-made oval lakes and other water race courses used for water–ski and jetski racing, including the privately owned Cheyenne Lake. The Horton Lakes Water Ski School and Wet Set Village, which have hosted water ski tournaments seen on ESPN, are in Newberry Springs.

There are also desert courses used for motocross, dune buggy, and ATV racing. The area also supports camping, hunting, fishing, wilderness backpacking, and paraflying. Paraflyte Ranch, a paraflying school, is in the area.

== Attractions ==
Near Newberry Springs is the Calico Ghost Town, the Calico Early Man Site, the Camp Cady wildlife reserve and the Solar One green energy project. Every November, the town is the host of the annual Newberry Springs Pistachio Festival.

North of Newberry Springs is the former Lake Dolores/Rock-A-Hoola Waterpark. Newberry Springs is home to the St. Anthony Orthodox Coptic Monastery.

The Newberry Mountains Wilderness Area is nearby.

Another popular attraction in Newberry Springs is Mrs. Orcutt's Driveway, where Car and Driver used to do speed tests due to the 4 mile long driveway built as a concession in exchange of building Interstate 40

== Media ==
=== Film ===
In 1987, the motion picture Bagdad Café was filmed in the area and the truck-stop restaurant featured in the film still stands. The motel in the film has crumbled, but its foundation remains. The cafe is now frequented by locals and visitors, but mostly by French and German tourists who are fans of the film. Prior to the film the restaurant had a different name. The Bagdad cafe was in nearby Bagdad/Chase Mine area. Gold from the Chase Mine helped establish the bank of the same name, Chase Manhattan.

In 2015, Newberry Springs was one of the filming locations for the film Sky.

The 2022 American psychological thriller film Don't Worry Darling, starring Florence Pugh and Harry Styles, was filmed around Newberry Springs, in particular at Volcano House.
