= Lake Dolores Waterpark =

Abandoned park in Newberry Springs, California

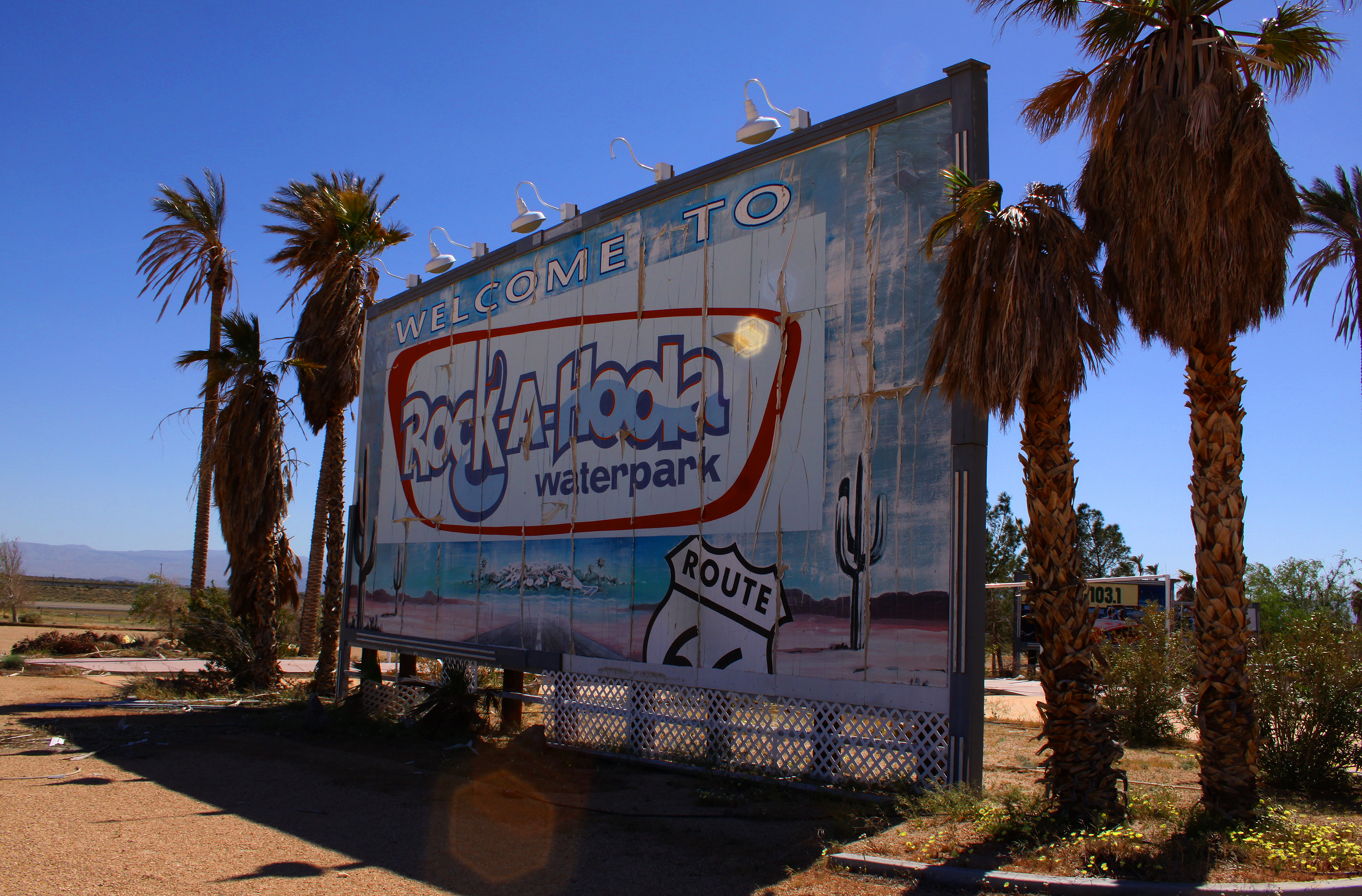
- The Rock-a-Hoola sign that greeted visitors into the park, April 2011.
- Interactive map of Lake Dolores Waterpark
- Location: Newberry Springs, California, United States
- Coordinates: 34°56′54″N 116°41′15″W
- Opened: May 1962
- Closed: 2004
- Previous names: Lake Dolores; Rock–A–Hoola Waterpark; Discovery Waterpark
- Status: Defunct[[]]

Lake Dolores Waterpark is an abandoned waterpark off Interstate 15 in the Mojave Desert in the community of Newberry Springs, California, United States. The waterpark had operated under numerous names in the past, including Lake Dolores, Rock–A–Hoola Waterpark, and Discovery Waterpark.

== History ==
=== Beginnings (1950s–90s) ===
The park was originally designed and built by local businessman Bob Byers for use by his extended family. Lake Dolores was named after Byers' wife.

The initial phases of conception, planning and construction took place in the late 1950s and early 1960s. An expanse of arid land on the eastern edge of the Mojave Desert 100 yards (91 m) from Interstate 15 was chosen for the project. The area contains underground springs fed by the Mojave Aquifer. Lake Dolores, the body of water, is a 273-acre (110 ha) man-made lake fed by underground springs.

In May 1962, a basic campground adjacent to the small lake was opened to the public. Enthusiasts of motocross and people traveling on Interstate 15 between Los Angeles and Las Vegas gave the campground some business.

Over the next 25 years, rides and attractions were added, and the site evolved into a waterpark, which was advertised on television with the slogan "The Fun Spot of The Desert!"

The park featured eight identical 150-foot (46 m) sixty–degree–angle steel waterslides mounted side by side on a man–made hill. Riders rode on small plastic "floaties" which skimmed 40 to 50 yards (37 to 46 m) across the lagoon when they hit the water at the slide's end.

Nearby were two V–shaped waterslides, also roughly 150 feet (46 m) long, which were ridden standing up. The slides ended about 15 feet (4.6 m) above the water, shooting the standing rider out of the end like a human cannonball.

On the "Zip–Cord" ride, riders hung from a hand–held device attached to a guide wire for approximately 200 feet (61 m) at a 30–degree downward angle. At the end of this wire the hand–grip would slam into a blocking mechanism and come to a stop about 20 feet (6.1 m) above the water, with the momentum thrusting the hanging rider 20 feet (6.1 m) forward into the lagoon.

In the middle of a smaller adjacent lake were three high diving boards, and three trapeze-like swings hanging from an A–frame structure mounted on a 20-foot (6.1 m) high platform. Riders launched themselves from these swings into the lake.

The park saw its peak attendance between the early 1970s and the mid-1980s. After a downturn in popularity in the late 1980s, the park closed.

=== Later development (1990–2004) ===
==== Rock–A–Hoola Waterpark ====
Byers sold the defunct park in August 1990 to Lake Dolores Group LLC, a three–member investment group led by Oxnard, California businessman Terry Christensen, who envisioned a more polished park with a 1950s theme.

In 1995, the original water slides were removed and replaced with more modern fiberglass water slides built by WhiteWater West and were painted red white and blue to look like the United States flag to give the park a patriotic feeling. One of the slides was "The Big Bopper" advertised as the world's largest family raft ride, and promotion was contracted to Beachport Entertainment Corporation, and the park reopened under a new name, "Rock–A–Hoola", on July 4, 1998. The new park featured the constant playing of 1950s and 1960s rock and roll music throughout the park along with some compatible graphics. In its "Rock–A–Hoola" incarnation, the park included a river ride on inflated tubes.

An on–premises RV park had been planned but its opening was delayed. In its three seasons, the park amassed three million dollars in debt, one of the three investors experienced financial problems, and an employee paralyzed in a 1999 accident was awarded $4.4 million in damages. That award was affirmed by the California Fourth District Court of Appeal in 2004.

The park filed for Chapter 11 bankruptcy in February 2000. The court–appointed trustee failed to find a buyer and, in August 2000, the bankruptcy filing was changed to Chapter 7 liquidation. The bankruptcy judge overseeing the case returned the property to Dolores Byers (husband Bob Byers died in 1996) with most debts discharged.

Dolores Byers sold the property in September 2001 to S.L. Investment Group LLC of the City of Industry, California. She died a month later.

==== Discovery Waterpark ====
After a $400,000 renovation, the waterpark reopened in May 2002 under a new name: Discovery Waterpark. In 2002 and 2003, the park was only open on weekends. In the summer of 2004, its final summer, the park only operated intermittently.

== After final closing ==
Some of the park installations were sold off in 2009. The Big Bopper and Thunder Road water slides were sold and dismantled and shipped to Cultus Lake Water Park in British Columbia Canada, where they were painted light blue and renamed "Colossal Canyon" and "Zero-60" and installed. Repeatedly vandalized, the park fell into ruins. Much of the park was torn apart by people who salvaged metal and wires from the buildings. Urban explorers frequently visited the waterpark, ignoring the "no trespassing” signs.

=== Redevelopment proposals ===
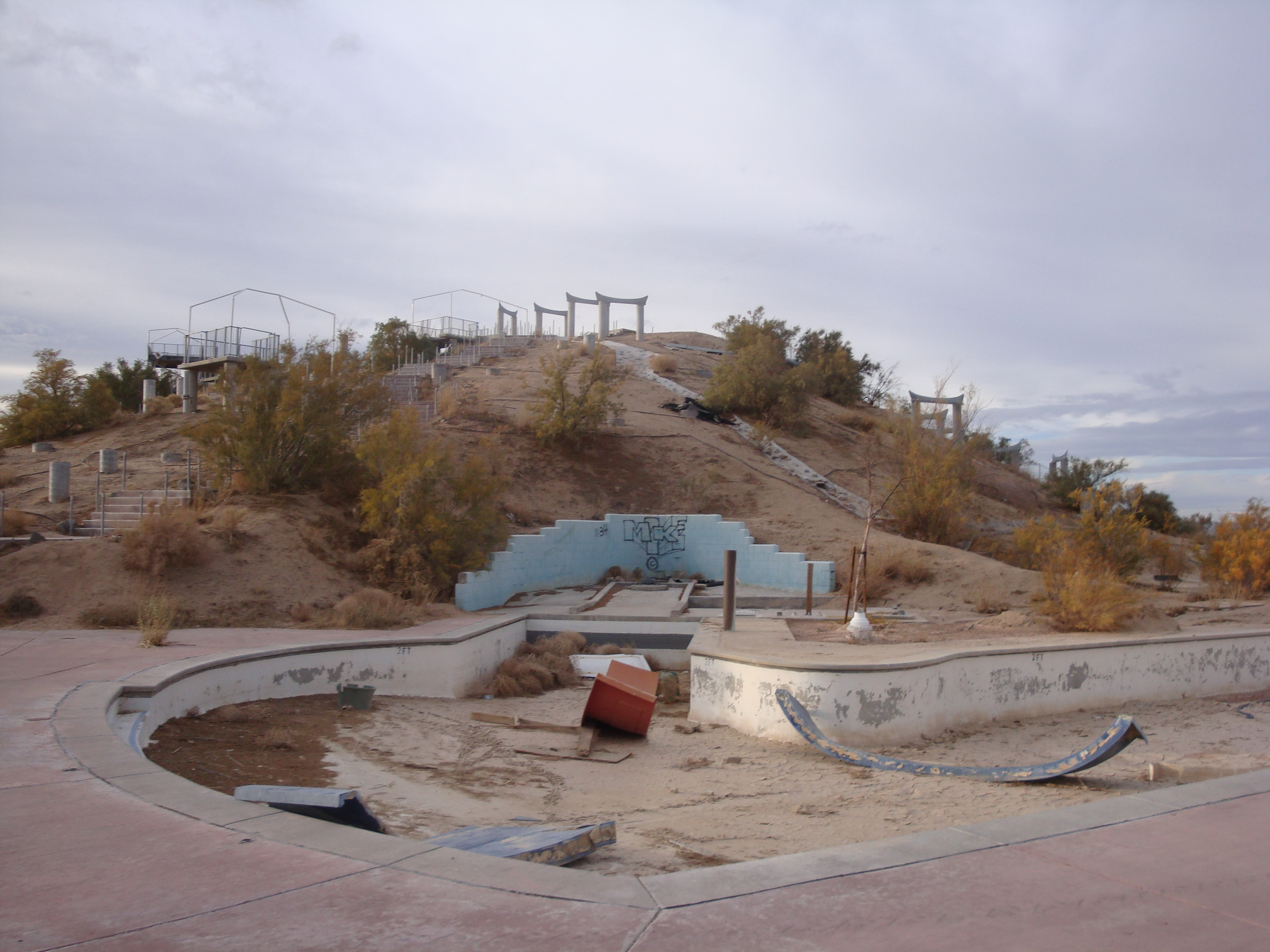
Lake Dolores Waterpark in 2012

In 2003, Olympic Gold Medalist and former professional football player Ron Brown and the Pro Players Network, a group of former and current professional athletes, formulated a proposal to purchase the park and turn it into a camp for disadvantaged youths, but this effort failed. The Oasis Themepark group announced a project in 2011 to renovate and reopen the park, but this effort failed.

The park was purchased in 2013 by G&GF Enterprises, LLC. In 2019, the company sought approval from the San Bernardino County Board of Supervisors to redevelop the water park. The proposal was a five phase plan set for construction to begin in 2020, with an anticipated full park opening in 2026. Project approval was given in March 2020. The project fell through, however, and the property was listed for sale in 2021 for $11 million.

=== Other uses ===
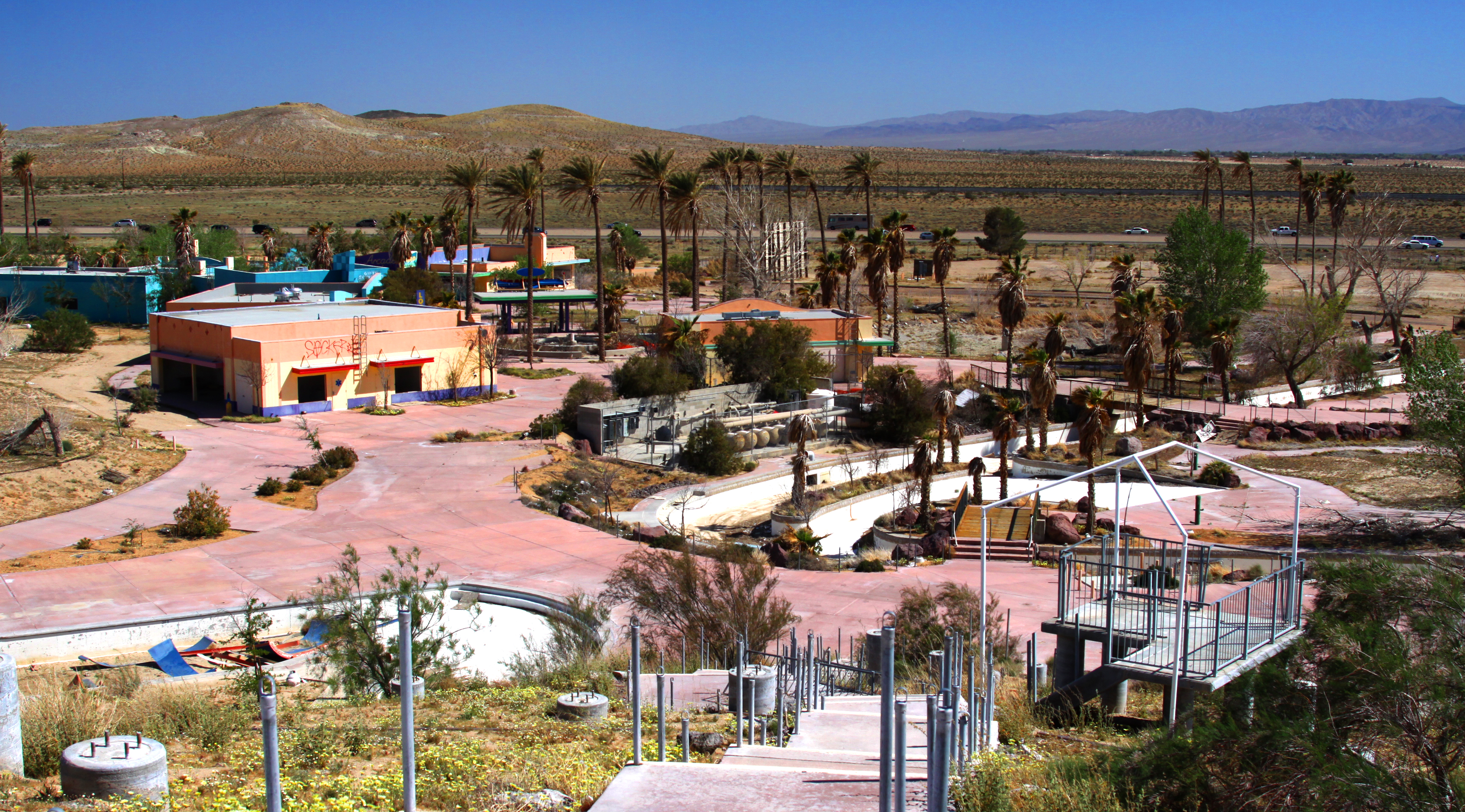
The remnants of Rock-A-Hoola Waterpark in the foreground, and Interstate 15 in the background.

The park was used in the 1998 film Desert Blue, where a rising Hollywood starlet becomes "marooned" in a small desert town while on a roadtrip with her father. There, she gets to know the town's rather eccentric residents, including one whose hobby is pipe bombs and another who is trying to carry out his father's dream of building a waterpark in the desert.

The park appeared in a March 2008 episode of the reality show Rob & Big on MTV. Professional skateboarder Rob Dyrdek and friends used the waterpark and its slides to perform skateboard stunts for the show. In June 2012, another skate film Kilian Martin: Altered Route directed by Brett Novak and sponsored in part by Mercedes-Benz showed the park in its current state while reflecting on its past appearance. TrustoCorp, a group of artists from New York City, transformed the park in 2013 to a "TrustoLand" as an artistic statement, by repainting many signs and buildings with unusual images and messages.

On May 27, 2013, Boards of Canada publicly debuted their album Tomorrow's Harvest by playing it first at Lake Dolores Waterpark. They had previously hinted that it would be played there by tweeting satellite images and uploading a video to YouTube featuring a distorted advertisement for the park titled "Look Sad Reel", an anagram of Lake Dolores.

Top Gear America used the water park in September 2014 as an obstacle course in Season 5 Episode 7 "What Can It Take".

In November 2014, the water park was used as the site of an Operation Lion Claws airsoft event, 'War of Angels'.

The park was a setting for a 2015 Mini Cooper television commercial featuring Tony Hawk.

Lake Dolores appeared on an October 2016 episode of Abandoned, which airs on Viceland network.

In 2018, the abandoned park was the victim of arson, causing the destruction of the Lazy River Cafe and Arcade.

In February 2020, the park appeared in American singer Kesha's music video for her song "High Road".

In April 2022, pop supergroup BTS filmed a mini concert called “Proof Live” on the old waterpark grounds. It aired on YouTube on the 9th anniversary of BTS’s debut, June 13, in celebration of the release of their new anthology album Proof. They performed 3 songs from “Proof” including “Born Singer”, “For Youth”, and their single “Yet to Come (The Most Beautiful Moment)”, which featured surprise guest Anderson .Paak on the drums.

In 2022, the park was featured in a show called "Mysteries of the Abandoned: Hidden America."

In 2025, Lake Dolores Waterpark was featured in an episode of BuzzFeed Unsolved Desert Lore titled "Investigating The Most Dangerous Waterpark in The Desert".

== See also ==
- List of water parks
- Sengme Oaks Water Park, a formerly abandoned water park in San Diego County
