= Santa Clarita, California =

- City
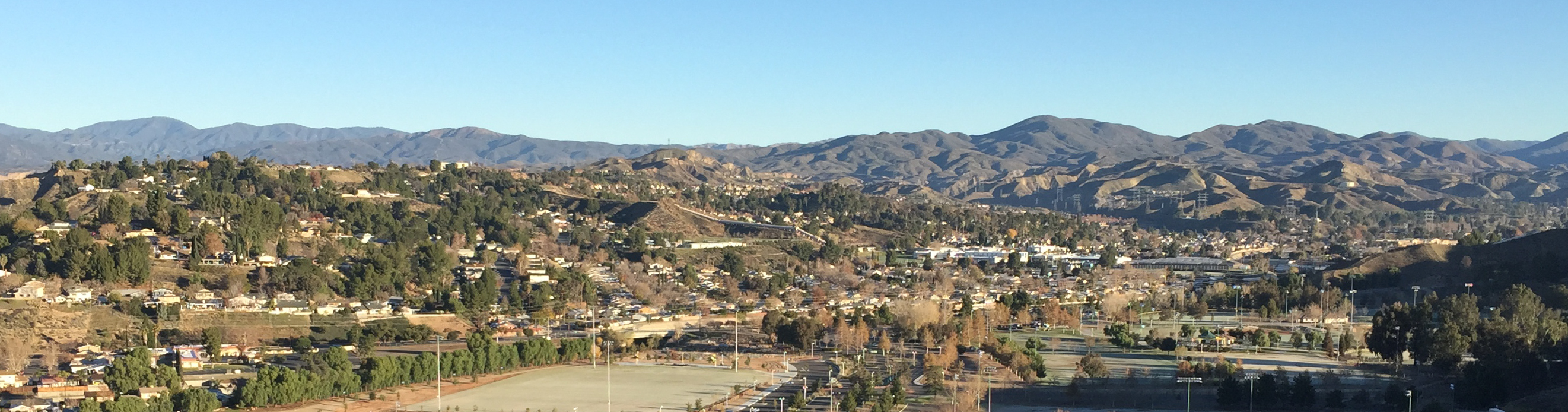
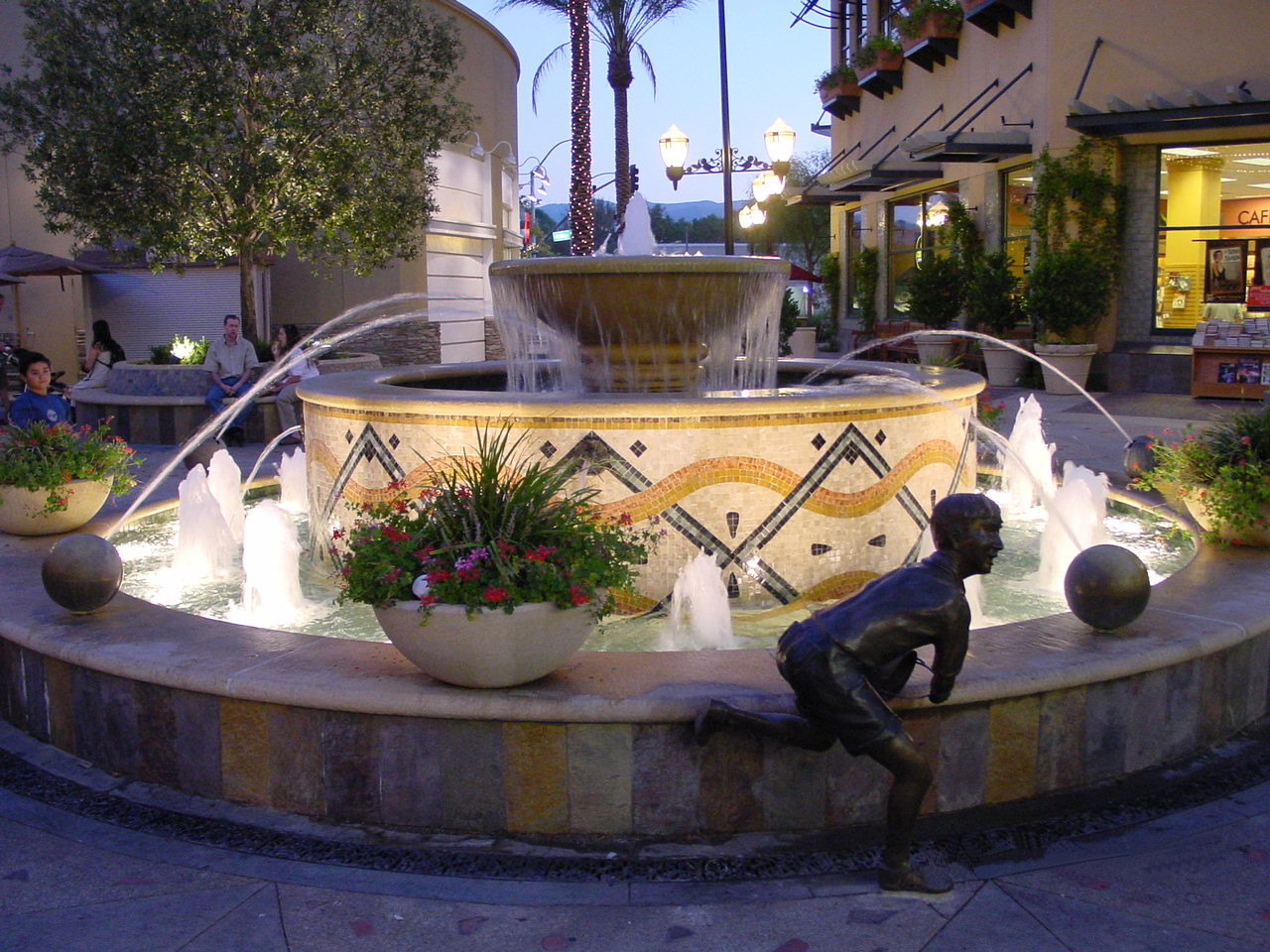
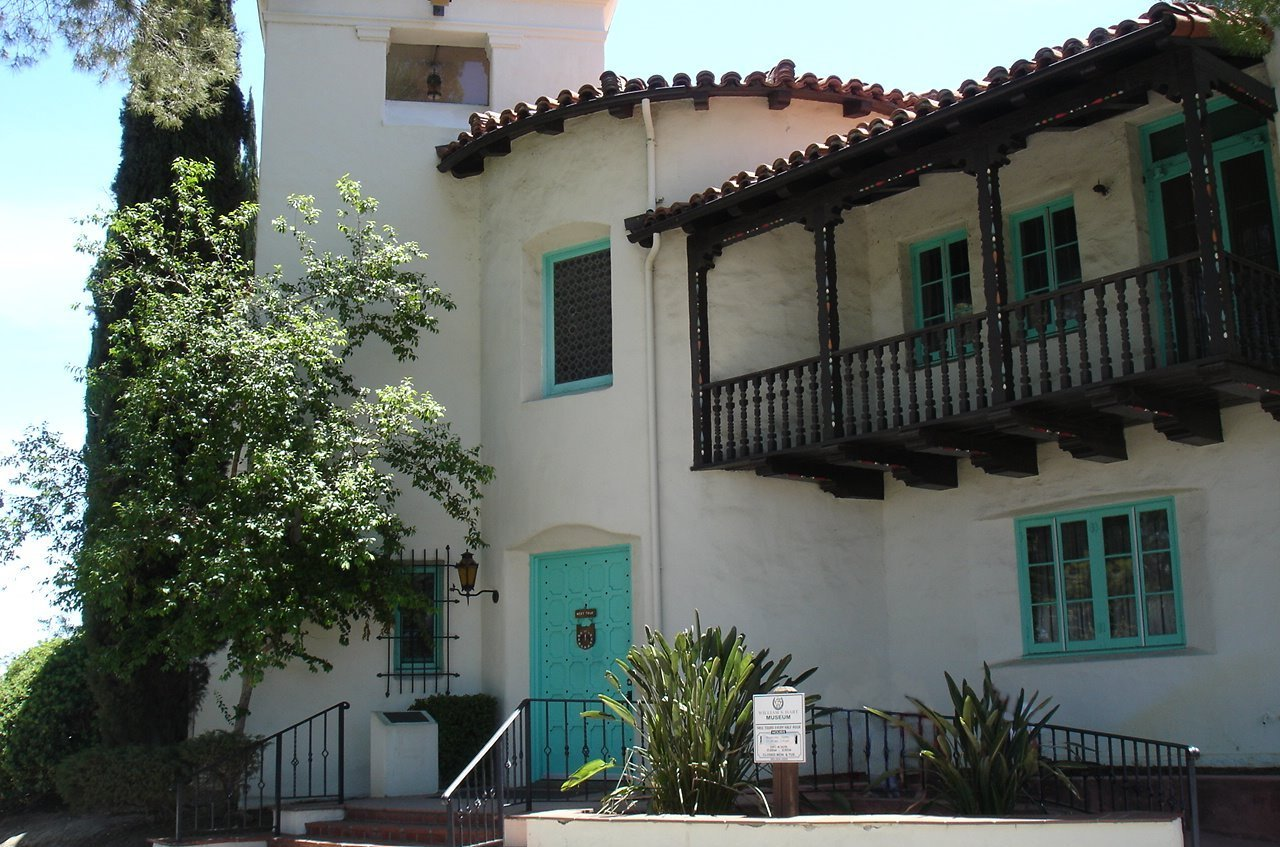
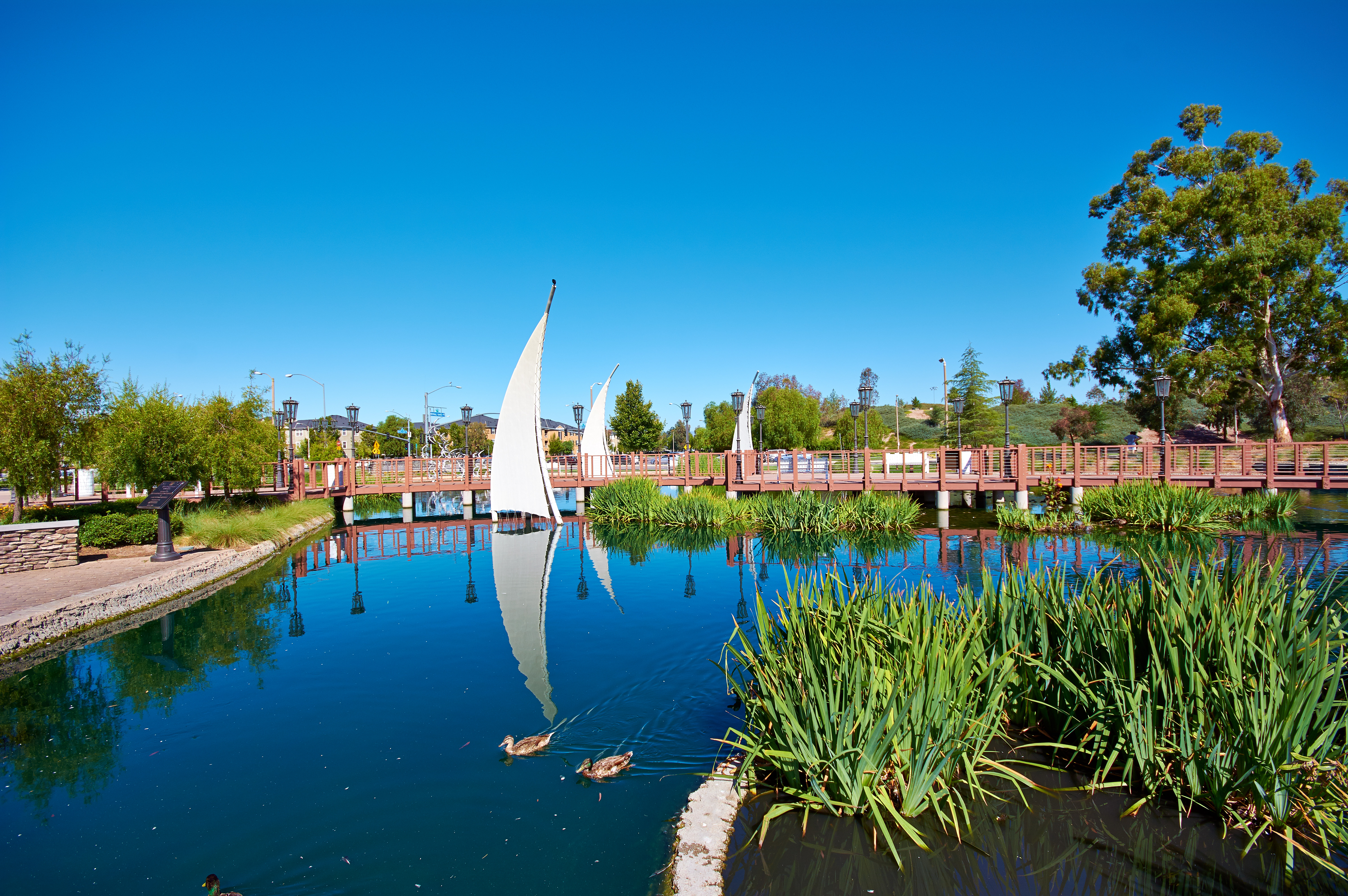
- Central Park Valencia Town Center La Loma de los Vientos Bridgeport Marketplace Lake

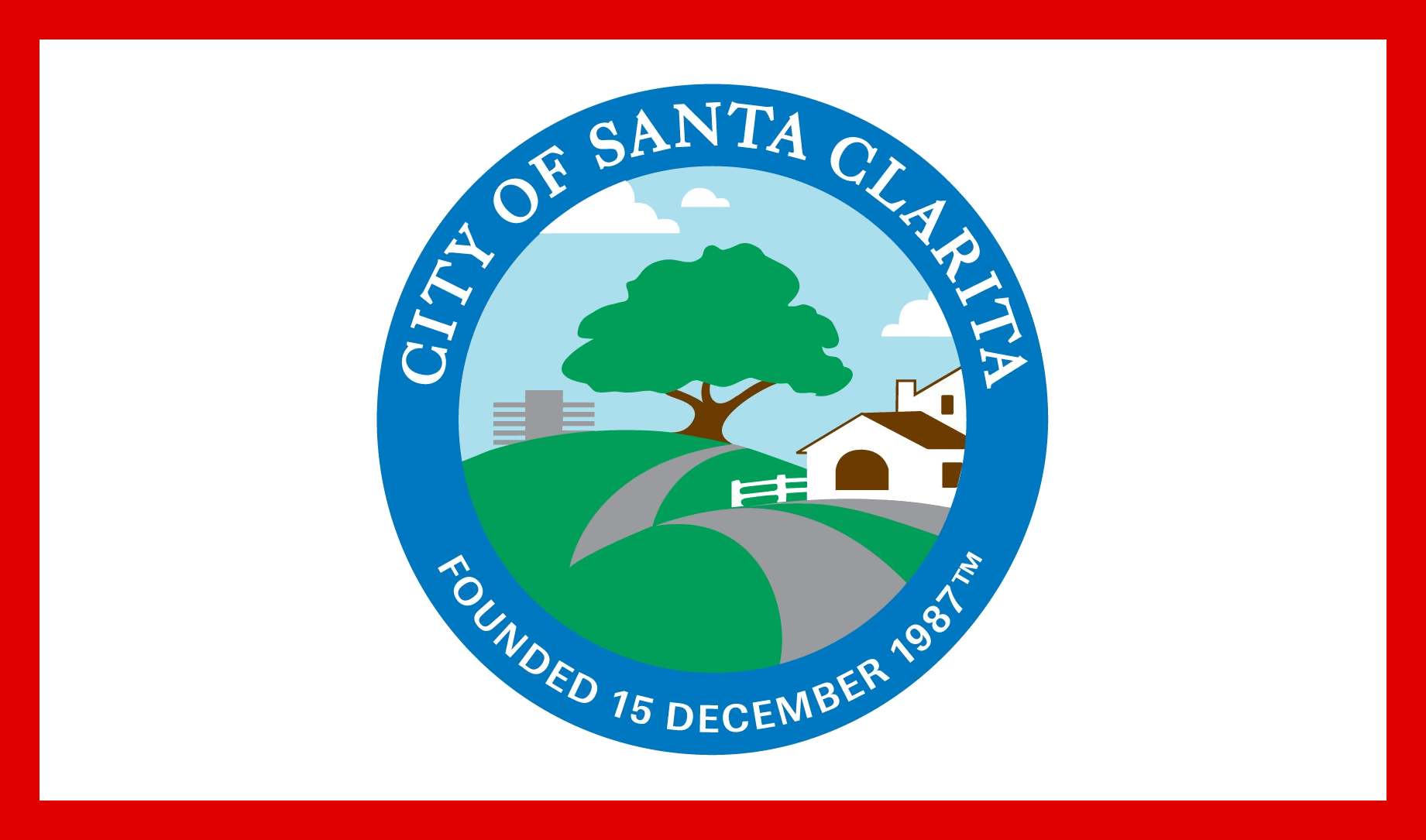
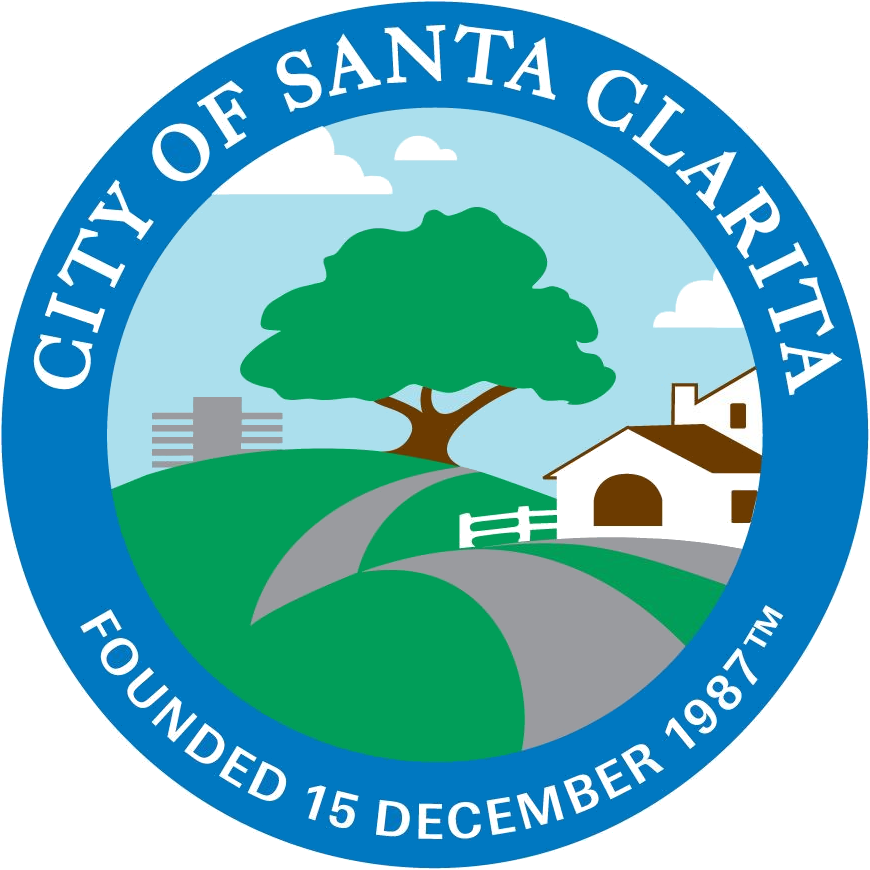
- Flag Seal
- Nickname: SCV
- Motto: Where the Good Life Takes You
- Coordinates: 34.42°N 118.52°W
- Country: United States
- State: California
- County: Los Angeles
- Incorporated: December 15, 1987
- Named for: Santa Clara River and Saint Clare of Assisi

Government
  - Type: Council–Manager
  - Mayor: Laurene Weste (R)
  - Mayor Pro Tem (District 1): Patsy Ayala (N)
  - City council (District 3): Jason Gibbs (R)
  - City Council (At large): Bill Miranda (N)
  - City Council (At large): Marsha McLean (N)
  - City manager: Ken Striplin

Area
  - City: 70.81 sq mi (183.41 km^{2})
  - Land: 70.75 sq mi (183.25 km^{2})
  - Water: 0.062 sq mi (0.16 km^{2}) 0.09%
- Elevation: 1,207 ft (368 m)

Population (2020)
  - City: 228,673
  - Rank: 3rd in Los Angeles County; 17th in California; 103rd in the United States
  - Density: 3,200/sq mi (1,250/km^{2})
  - Urban: 278,031 (US: 146th)
  - Urban density: 3,570/sq mi (1,379/km^{2})
- Demonym: Santa Claritan
- Time zone: UTC−08:00 (Pacific)
  - Summer (DST): UTC−07:00 (PDT)
- ZIP Codes: 91321–91322, 91350–91351, 91354–91355, 91380, 91385–91387, 91390 (Note: This only includes ZIP Codes within the Santa Clarita city limits. Some ZIP Codes in the valley, such as 91381 (Stevenson Ranch) and 91384 (Castaic), have "Santa Clarita" as an acceptable place name, but are entirely outside the city limits.)
- Area code: 661
- FIPS code: 06-69088
- GNIS feature IDs: 1662338, 2411819

Santa Clarita (/ˌsæntə kləˈriːtə/; Spanish for "Little St. Clare") is a suburban city in northwestern Los Angeles County, California, United States. With a 2020 census population of 228,673, it is the third-most populous city in Los Angeles County, the 17th-most populous in California, and the 105th-most populous city in the United States. It is located about 30 miles (48 km) northwest of downtown Los Angeles, and occupies 70.75 square miles (183.2 km^{2}) of land in the Santa Clarita Valley, along the Santa Clara River. It is a classic example of a U.S. edge city, satellite city, or boomburb.

Human settlement of the Santa Clarita Valley dates back to the arrival of the Chumash people, who were displaced by the Tataviam c. 450 AD. After Spanish colonists arrived in Alta California, the Rancho San Francisco was established, covering much of the Santa Clarita Valley. Henry Mayo Newhall purchased the Rancho San Francisco in 1875 and established the towns of Saugus and Newhall. The Newhall Land and Farming Company played a major role in the city's development. In December 1987, the city of Santa Clarita was incorporated, encompassing the communities of Canyon Country, Newhall, Saugus, and Valencia. The four communities retain separate identities, and residents commonly refer to one of them when asked where they are from. Santa Clarita is bounded on the west by the Golden State Freeway (I-5). The Antelope Valley Freeway (CA-14) runs northeast–southwest, forming part of the city's irregular eastern boundary. The two freeways meet at Newhall Pass, near the city's southernmost point.

Santa Clarita is home to three institutions of higher education: California Institute of the Arts, a private art university; The Master's University, a Christian liberal arts university; and College of the Canyons, a community college. Companies headquartered in or near the city include Princess Cruises, Sunkist, Remo, and the Newhall Land and Farming Company. The unincorporated communities of Castaic and Stevenson Ranch, located to the north and west of the Santa Clarita city limits, respectively, are closely associated with the city. Six Flags Magic Mountain, though commonly thought to be in the Valencia part of Santa Clarita, is also west of Interstate 5 and outside of the Santa Clarita city limits.

== Name ==
The Santa Clara River was named by Spanish explorers for Saint Clare of Assisi. The valley and the settlement later became known as "little Santa Clara" ("Santa Clarita" in the Spanish diminutive) to distinguish it from the Northern Californian city of Santa Clara and its accompanying Mission Santa Clara de Asís. The Santa Clarita Valley similarly differentiates itself from the Santa Clara Valley in Northern California. The region was not widely referred to as Santa Clarita until the 1950s; before this, it was unofficially referred to as the "Newhall–Saugus area" and the "Bonelli tract," after a family that owned land in the valley.

== History ==
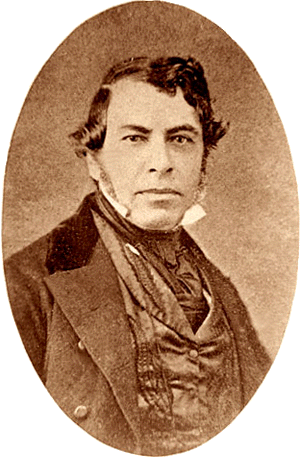
Don Ygnacio del Valle, a Californio ranchero, owned much of Santa Clarita as part of his Rancho San Francisco. He founded the original settlement in Santa Clarita.

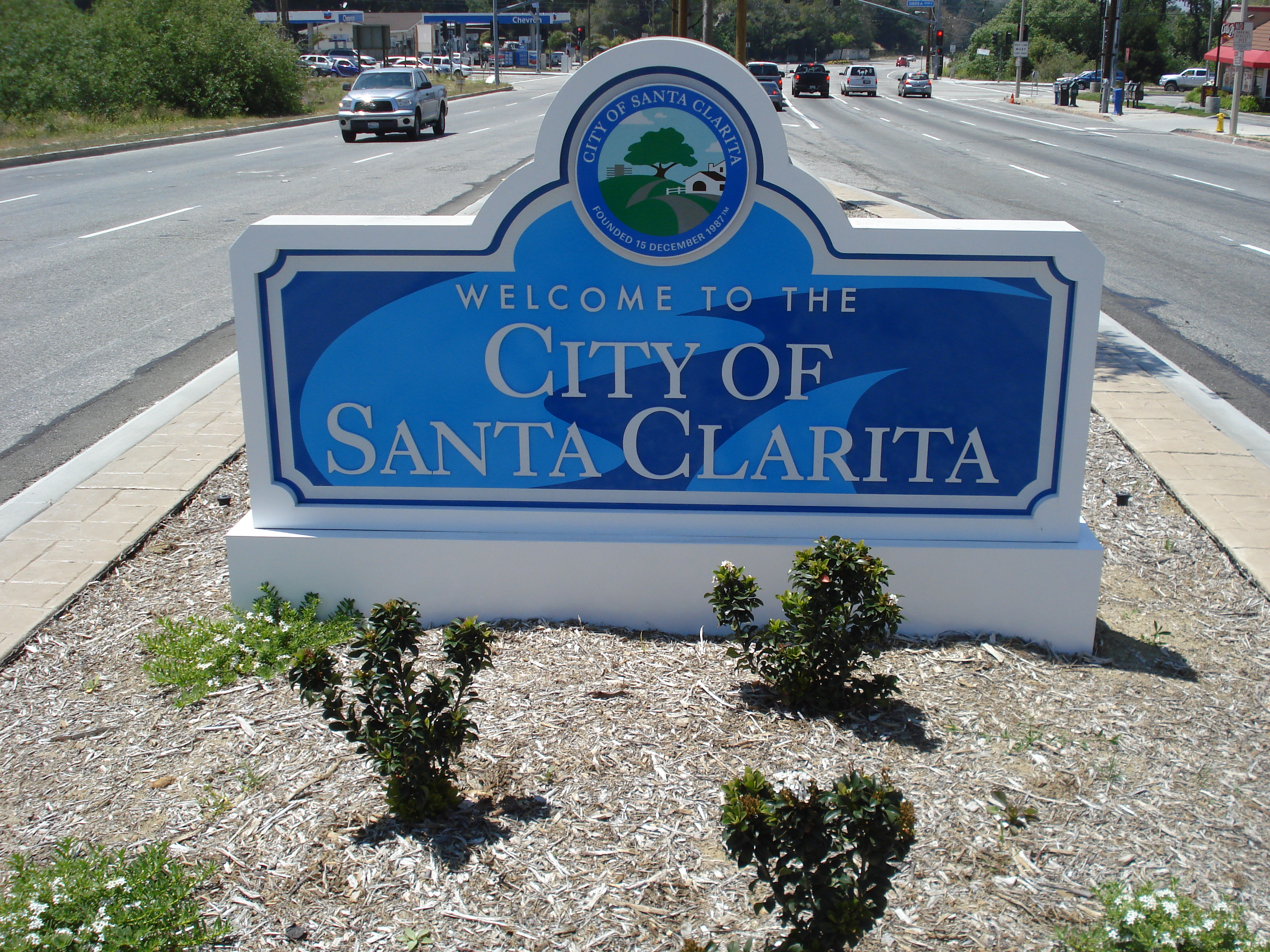
The Santa Clarita welcome sign (on Newhall Avenue in Newhall near the 14 freeway) in May 2010

=== Pre-Columbian and Spanish colonial eras ===
The Santa Clarita Valley has been settled for millennia before European arrival. The oldest archaeological site in the area dates back to roughly 3000 BC. About AD 450, the Tataviam arrived, displacing the Chumash people who previously inhabited the area. The Tataviam lived in approximately 20 villages in the valley and surrounding areas including Piru, Agua Dulce, Elizabeth Lake, and Tochonanga.

In the 18th century, Spanish colonists arrived in southern California including Santa Clarita, founding mission settlements. The Mission San Fernando was founded in 1797 in present-day Mission Hills, just 9.5 miles (15.3 km) south of downtown Newhall. In 1822, Alta California, which included most of the present-day southwestern United States including all of California, became a territory of the newly independent country of Mexico.

The 48,612-acre (196.73 km^{2}) Rancho San Francisco land grant was issued by Juan Bautista Alvarado, governor of Alta California, to Mexican army officer Antonio del Valle. It was an agricultural area serving the nearby Mission San Fernando.

=== 1822–1899: Gold discovery, Mentryville, and Henry Mayo Newhall ===
In 1842, Francisco Lopez discovered gold in Placerita Canyon—the first documented discovery of gold in California. The discovery is commemorated in an 1842 mining claim issued by Governor Alvarado. The Oak of the Golden Dream, which marks the site of the discovery, remains an attraction for tourists. Several places throughout Santa Clarita carry the "Golden Oak" name, including Golden Oak Road in Saugus; Golden Oak Lane, Golden Oak Ranch, and Golden Oak Adult School in Newhall; and Golden Oak Community School in Canyon Country.

The United States acquired California in 1848, after winning the Mexican–American War. The community of Newhall is named after Henry Newhall, an American businessman who made his fortune during the California Gold Rush. He founded the H.M. Newhall & Company, a successful auction house in San Francisco. Newhall had also invested in rail companies that would connect San Francisco to other cities and became president of the San Francisco and San Jose Railroad. In 1870, he and his partners sold the company to Southern Pacific Railroad, and he served on Southern Pacific's board of directors.

From 1858 to 1861, the Santa Clarita Valley was used as a transportation corridor for the Butterfield Overland Mail stagecoach service as part of its first division, stretching from San Francisco to Los Angeles. Two Butterfield Overland Mail stations were located in the area: Lyons Station in Newhall, and King's Station in San Francisquito Canyon. Beale's Cut was constructed in 1859 through what is now known as the Newhall Pass.

After railroads, Newhall turned to real estate and ranching. He purchased a number of the former Spanish and Mexican land grants in the state, amassing a total of 143,000 acres (58,000 ha) between Monterey and Los Angeles counties. The most significant portion was the Rancho San Francisco, which he purchased for $2/acre. It became known as Newhall Ranch after Newhall's death. Within this territory, Newhall granted a right-of-way to Southern Pacific through what is now Newhall Pass. He also sold the railroad part of the land, upon which the company built the town of Newhall, founded just north of the present-day intersection of Magic Mountain Parkway and Railroad Avenue. He moved the town south in 1879, and the original townsite was named Saugus, after Henry Newhall's hometown of Saugus, Massachusetts.

After his death, Newhall's heirs incorporated the Newhall Land and Farming Company in 1883. Since its founding, it has overseen the development of the communities that comprise present-day Santa Clarita, including the master-planned community of Valencia (in which it is headquartered), Canyon Country, Newhall, and Saugus. The company also manages farm land elsewhere in the state.

On September 5, 1876, Charles Crocker, president of the Southern Pacific Company, hammered a ceremonial spike into a railroad tie at Lang Southern Pacific Station in what is now far eastern Canyon Country, marking the completion of the San Joaquin Valley line of the Southern Pacific Railroad, connecting Los Angeles to San Francisco and the rest of the nation for the first time.

In the 1850s and 1860s, businessmen and political leaders including Andrés Pico, Sanford Lyon, Henry Clay Wiley, Darius Towsley, and Christopher Leaming came to the Santa Clarita Valley for its oil reserves. On September 26, 1876, the town of Mentryville was founded by French immigrant Charles Alexander Mentry near present-day Stevenson Ranch. Mentryville's Pico Number 4 oil well was the first commercially successful oil well in the western United States. Oil from Mentryville was refined at Pioneer Oil Refinery in Newhall, the first viable oil refinery in the state. (Pioneer Oil Refinery is currently the only site on the National Register of Historic Places within the city limits of Santa Clarita.) By the early 1900s, most of Pico Canyon's richest oil reserves had been depleted, although Pico Number 4 continued to operate until 1990. Many of the aforementioned oil pioneers have lent their names to streets in the valley, such as Pico Canyon Road, Lyons Avenue, Wiley Canyon Road, and Towsley Canyon Road. Drilling continues to occur in Santa Clarita at the Honor Rancho Oil Field.

The Saugus Cafe was established in 1886 near the present-day intersection of Railroad Avenue and Magic Mountain Parkway. It is the oldest continuously operating restaurant in Los Angeles County.

=== 1900–1987 ===
Los Angeles studios began filming in Santa Clarita shortly after the turn of the 20th century. Actors in these early films included William S. Hart, Tom Mix, Harry Carey, and a young John Wayne. Many movie ranches (see section below) were developed in the Santa Clarita Valley. Hart and Carey made their homes in the valley; today both of their former estates are operated as county parks.

One major contributor to the valley's early development was the Whittaker-Bermite Corporation. From 1934 to 1987, the corporation manufactured, stored, and tested explosives, including bombs and bottle rockets, on a 996-acre site (403 ha) south of Soledad Canyon Road, east of Railroad Avenue, northeast of the Circle J Ranch community, southwest of Centre Pointe Parkway, and west of Golden Valley Road. The first housing tract in the area consisted of company homes along Walnut Street in Newhall. In modern times, the California Department of Toxic Substances Control has made efforts to clean the area of perchlorate and other toxic chemicals left behind by decades of munitions testing. The site is being considered for development.

The Santa Clarita Valley was the scene of the second deadliest disaster in California's history, known as the "worst civil engineering failure of the 20th century." Shortly before midnight on March 12, 1928, the St. Francis Dam collapsed. Water from the St. Francis Reservoir coursed through San Francisquito Canyon and the Santa Clara River in a wave up to 140 feet (43 m) high and 2 miles (3.2 km) wide, destroying buildings in its path. By the time the floodwaters reached the Pacific Ocean near Ventura five hours later, 411 people had died. Some buildings in Newhall became makeshift morgues. After the disaster, engineer William Mulholland resigned from his position as superintendent of the Los Angeles Bureau of Water Works and Supply (now the Department of Water and Power).

On December 27, 1936, United Airlines Trip 34 crashed into a hilltop in Rice Canyon which is near Newhall, killing all twelve people on board.

In 1945, the Santa Clarita Union High School District was created. The following year it was renamed William S. Hart Union High School District after William S. Hart. The district's first high school was William S. Hart High School in Newhall.

The first official use of the name "Santa Clarita" in a housing development appeared in the Rancho Santa Clarita housing tract in Saugus, built in 1947.

On September 17, 1966, William V. Fowler, Grand Cyclops (leader) of the California Knights of the Ku Klux Klan, organized a reactivation rally in Soledad Canyon, on Capra Road around 2 miles (3.2 km) east of the present-day Soledad Canyon Road exit on State Route 14. Fowler sought to reactivate the KKK in California, where it was banned by law since 1946. Estimates of the rally's size range from 30 to 100 people, far fewer than the 5,000 to 10,000 Fowler expected. The rally took place on United States Forest Service property and included a fake cross burning. Just one person was arrested at the rally – for assaulting a police officer he mistook for a Klansman.

On April 5, 1970, four CHP officers were shot dead by two heavily armed career criminals at a Standard Gas Station in present-day Valencia. The shootout was the deadliest attack on law enforcement in California history. As Valencia had barely been developed, it came to be known as the Newhall incident. One of the perpetrators was sentenced to life in prison; the other committed suicide. In the aftermath of the incident, policing was transformed nationwide – police training and weaponry were improved and bullet proof vests became widespread.

In the early morning of July 23, 1982, a helicopter crash occurred at the Indian Dunes amusement park in Valencia during the making of Twilight Zone: The Movie, killing three people.

As early as 1920, there were attempts to incorporate some of the communities of the Santa Clara River Valley. Four years later a chamber of commerce was formed in Newhall, with one of its goals being city formation.

Starting in 1970s, residents, such as educator Carl Boyer III and retired businessman H. Gil Callowhill, began efforts to determine the feasibility of incorporating Newhall, Saugus and Valencia into a city. In 1974, individuals, such as Signal co-editor Ruth Newhall, suggested that the Santa Clarita area should secede from Los Angeles County to form their own county. That December a new committee was formed to lead the fight to break Acton, Agua Dulce, Gorman, Castaic, Val Verde, Canyon Country, Saugus, Valencia and Newhall off from Los Angeles County. The new entity was to be called Canyon County. This effort eventually led to the creation of Proposition F on the 1976 November ballot. Under state law, the creation of the new county would have to be approved by all the voters in the existing county. This effort failed with sixty-eight to thirty-two percent of the county at large rejecting it. The proposed Canyon County voted fifty-five percent in favor of its creation. On November 7, 1978, the area of Canyon County tried again to secede. Proposition K revealed greater support for the creation of a new county, in which fifty-nine percent of local voters voted in favor, but, again, most LA county voters rejected it.

Despite the rejection of "home rule" through the creation of Canyon County, attention turned back to creating a new city. In the mid-1980s, Louis Garasi, president of the Santa Clarita Valley Chamber of Commerce, chaired the city formation committee, with Connie Worden, a veteran of the Canyon County effort, as vice chair. As noted by Jerry Reynolds, "With strong support from the Santa Clarita Valley and Canyon Country chambers of commerce, the committee held lively, well-attended public meetings that revealed a growing interest in home rule and mounting dissatisfaction with inadequate roads." A petition campaign and the filing of the official cityhood application with the Local Agency Formation Commission (LAFCO) requested a 90-square-mile (230 km^{2}) area for the proposed City of Santa Clarita. The LAFCO shrunk the proposed city to just over 39 square miles (100 km^{2}), carving out most of the areas where development was pending.

The city boundaries approved by LAFCO included most of the populated areas of Newhall, Saugus, Canyon Country and Valencia. Left out were Castaic, Agua Dulce, everything west of Interstate 5, and most of the land south of State Route 14 except for Sand Canyon, whose inclusion was championed by three cityhood leaders who lived there – Lou Garasi, Jan Heidt and Howard P. "Buck" McKeon.

=== 1987–present: Incorporation ===
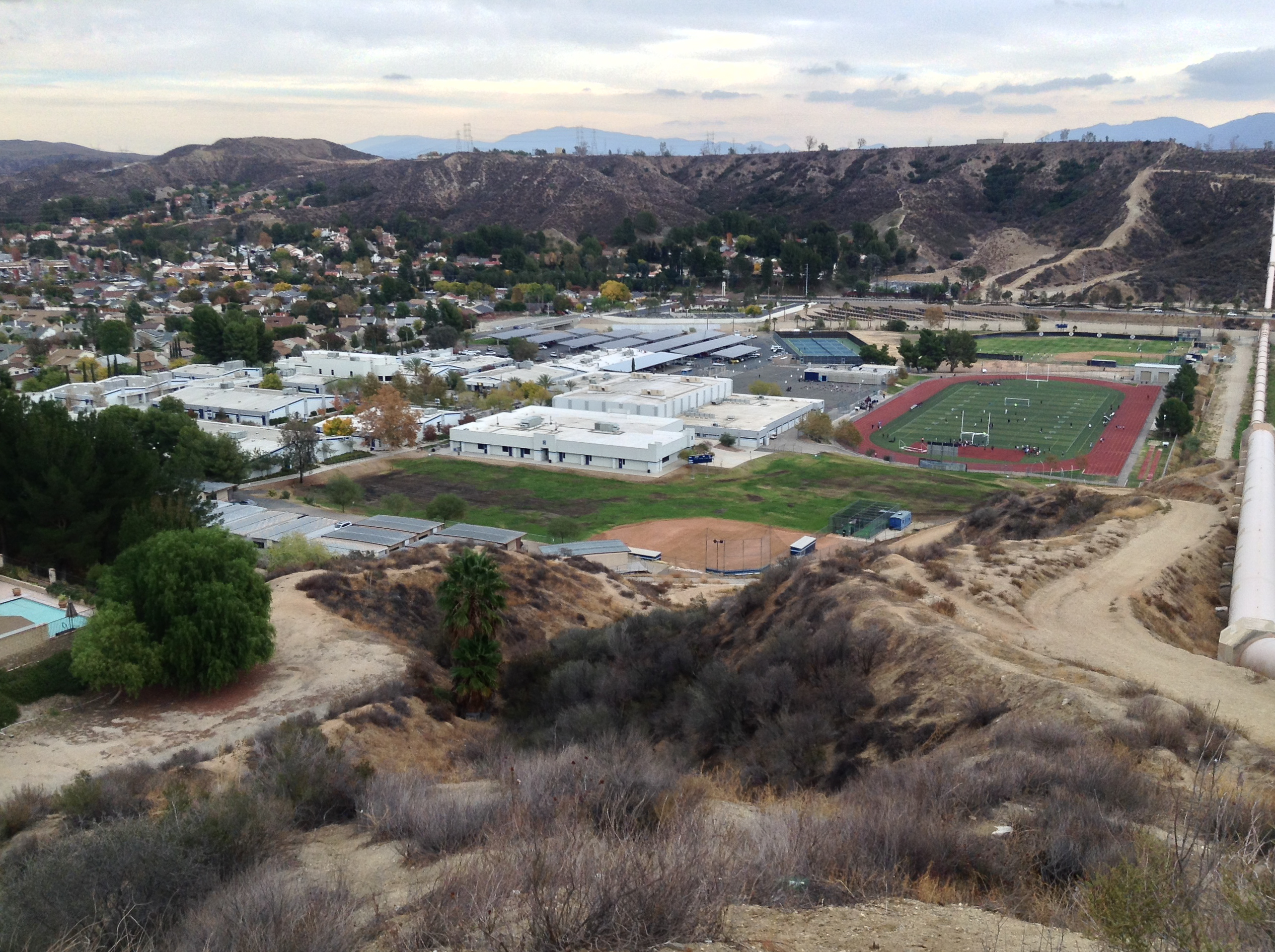
Saugus High School was the site of a deadly mass shooting on November 14, 2019.

After multiple failed attempts to form a city and at least two failed attempts to form a separate county, residents of the Santa Clarita Valley finally incorporated the City of Santa Clarita on December 15, 1987. The proposal passed by a margin of two to one in that year's general election. Other proposed names for the city were "City of the Canyons" and "La Mancha"; "Santa Clarita" narrowly defeated "City of the Canyons." The city's first mayor was future Congressman Buck McKeon.

In 1990, the federal government awarded Cemex a contract to mine millions of tons of sand and gravel in Soledad Canyon, just east of the city. The proposed mine caused controversy due to its potential for air pollution, traffic congestion, and environmental damage to the Angeles National Forest and Santa Clara River. The city of Santa Clarita fought for decades to prevent mining in the canyon. In 2019, the Interior Board of Land Appeals (part of the United States Department of the Interior) upheld a 2015 decision by the Bureau of Land Management, permanently preventing Cemex from mining in Soledad Canyon. Cemex had never mined any sand or gravel in the canyon.

Santa Clarita was devastated by the 1994 Northridge earthquake. The Newhall Pass interchange of I-5 and CA-14 collapsed, and Sierra Highway became the only route in and out of the valley; Sierra Highway was soon closed as well. Several surface streets throughout the city were closed due to structural damage. The Four Corners oil spill led to contamination of the Santa Clara River. Electricity was temporarily shut off for the entire valley, and schools were closed. Shelters opened in Newhall, Saugus, and Canyon Country. The National Guard was sent to the area, and City Hall was temporarily relocated. Water distribution points were set up as residents lost access to running water. The city suffered an estimated $76.8 million in damages.

Santa Clarita was ranked in 2006 by Money magazine as 18th of the 100 best places to live in the United States.

On November 14, 2019, a mass shooting occurred at Saugus High School. That morning, Nathaniel Berhow, a 16-year-old junior at the school, used a semi-automatic pistol to shoot five other students, killing two of them, before turning his gun on himself. The shooting lasted 16 seconds. Survivors were reunited with their parents at nearby Central Park, and injured students were sent to Henry Mayo Hospital in Valencia and Providence Holy Cross Medical Center in Mission Hills. The shooter succumbed to his self-inflicted injuries the following day in the hospital. A vigil honoring the victims was held at Central Park the next day.

In the 21st century, the city's developed area has expanded significantly as Lennar, Tri Pointe Homes, and KB Home have constructed housing developments in the area, including the neighborhoods of West Creek, West Hills, Aliento, River Village, Skyline Ranch, Vista Canyon, and Five Knolls. Just outside the city limits, a large development by the FivePoint company is in construction.

== Geography ==
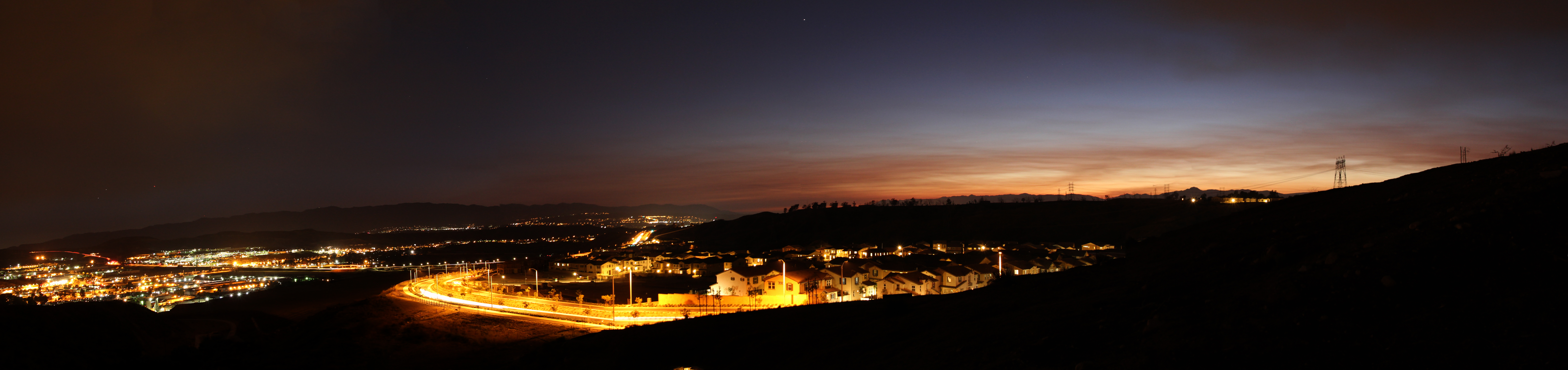
Santa Clarita in July 2016

Santa Clarita, according to the United States Census Bureau, covers an area of 70.82 square miles (183.4 km^{2}), of which 70.75 square miles (183.2 km^{2}) is land and 0.07 square miles (0.18 km^{2}) (0.10%) is water. Nearly half of the city's land area has been acquired via annexations; the city's area at the time of incorporation was just 39.09 square miles (101.2 km^{2}). The Newhall Pass is located at the southern end of the city, south of Newhall and north of the San Fernando Valley communities of Granada Hills and Sylmar.

Map of Santa Clarita, showing neighborhoods, city boundaries, freeways, major surface streets, and the Angeles National Forest

Santa Clarita lies within the Santa Clarita Valley, bounded by the San Gabriel Mountains to the east, the Santa Susana Mountains to the south and west, and the Sierra Pelona Mountains to the north, all part of the Transverse Ranges.

The broad Santa Clara River passes through the city from east to west. Though usually dry, the river exhibits significant surface flow during seasonal episodes of heavy rainfall. The river's numerous tributaries incise the hilly terrain of the valley to form steep canyons after which many of the city's major streets are named. The largest of these canyons are Bouquet Canyon, San Francisquito Canyon, Sand Canyon, and Soledad Canyon.

=== City limits ===
Currently, the city is bounded by Interstate 5 to the west, extending east to include almost all developed areas of the Santa Clarita Valley east of the freeway. Part of the city's eastern boundary follows California State Route 14, although the city limits extend beyond Route 14 to include the communities of Aliento, Fair Oaks Ranch, Vista Canyon, and Sand Canyon; the Plaza at Golden Valley shopping center; and the Whitney Canyon, Elsmere Canyon, Golden Valley Ranch, Walker Ranch, and East Walker Ranch open spaces. Santa Clarita extends as far east as the eastern end of Shenandoah Lane, east of Shadow Pines Boulevard in Canyon Country. The city limits also include a small exclave west of Interstate 5 in Towsley Canyon Park. The Angeles National Forest forms part of the city's northern and eastern boundaries, although parts of northern Saugus (north of Copper Hill Drive and Haskell Canyon Road) and Canyon Country (south of Placerita and Sand Canyon Roads) extend into the national forest.

=== Topography ===
The official elevation of the city is 1,207 feet (368 m), the elevation of the historic Newhall Airport which was northwest of Via Princessa and Railroad Avenue from the 1930s through the 1950s. Elevation varies substantially throughout the city. The lowest point in Santa Clarita is near the junction of CA-126 and I-5 (34.4422°N 118.6029°W), at an elevation of 1,024 feet (312 m). The highest point is in the San Gabriel Mountains south of Placerita and Sand Canyon Roads (34.3599°N 118.4062°W) at an elevation of 3,048 feet (929 m). Most populated areas in the city are 1,100–1,700 feet (340–520 m) above sea level. The highest residential areas of Canyon Country, north of Skyline Ranch Road and east of Shadow Pines Boulevard, exceed 2,000 feet (610 m).

=== Geology ===
Santa Clarita is near the San Fernando fault zone and has been affected by the 1971 San Fernando earthquake and 1994 Northridge earthquake (see above), both of which had epicenters in the San Fernando Valley.

=== Climate ===
Santa Clarita experiences a hot-summer Mediterranean climate (Csa) with hot, dry, sunny summers and cool, rainy winters. Due to its close proximity to the Mojave Desert (High Desert) and Pacific Ocean, and the city's wide range of elevations, varying micro-climates are common. There is a large diurnal temperature variation, especially in the summer.

During the summer (June through August) high temperatures average 90–95 °F (32–35 °C), commonly reaching 110 °F (43 °C) or higher during heat waves. Rain is very rare. Due to the aridity, summer temperatures cool down significantly at night. Summer and fall carry significant wildfire risk due to the presence of dry brush. The hottest temperature recorded in the city is 118 °F (48 °C) on July 5, 2024.

During winter, temperatures are mild to cool. In most winters, there are a few days with highs above 80 °F (27 °C) and a few days that stay below 50 °F (10 °C). Temperatures rarely fall below freezing. Rain falls primarily from December through March. Snowfall is very rare; the most recent snow was a light dusting in February 2023. Santa Clarita lies within USDA plant hardiness zone 10a, except for the far eastern part of the city, which is in zone 9b.

In Santa Clarita, the sun is above the horizon for 9 hours, 51 minutes on the winter solstice (December 20–22) and 14 hours, 28 minutes on the summer solstice (June 20–22).

Climate data for Santa Clarita, California
Month	Jan	Feb	Mar	Apr	May	Jun	Jul	Aug	Sep	Oct	Nov	Dec	Year
Record high °F (°C)	88 (31)	92 (33)	96 (36)	102 (39)	108 (42)	114 (46)	118 (48)	115 (46)	115 (46)	108 (42)	96 (36)	87 (31)	118 (48)
Mean maximum °F (°C)	81 (27)	81 (27)	85 (29)	91 (33)	95 (35)	102 (39)	110 (43)	108 (42)	104 (40)	96 (36)	85 (29)	78 (26)	112 (44)
Mean daily maximum °F (°C)	61.0 (16.1)	65.1 (18.4)	70.4 (21.3)	75.0 (23.9)	78.5 (25.8)	89.0 (31.7)	100.4 (38.0)	96.0 (35.6)	84.0 (28.9)	76.9 (24.9)	70.3 (21.3)	61.3 (16.3)	77.3 (25.2)
Daily mean °F (°C)	53.2 (11.8)	54.3 (12.4)	56.8 (13.8)	60.6 (15.9)	65.6 (18.7)	71.4 (21.9)	78.0 (25.6)	78.6 (25.9)	74.7 (23.7)	66.8 (19.3)	57.9 (14.4)	52.9 (11.6)	64.2 (17.9)
Mean daily minimum °F (°C)	42.1 (5.6)	43.4 (6.3)	45.2 (7.3)	48.1 (8.9)	52.6 (11.4)	56.4 (13.6)	62.1 (16.7)	62.5 (16.9)	59.3 (15.2)	53.1 (11.7)	45.4 (7.4)	41.5 (5.3)	51.0 (10.5)
Mean minimum °F (°C)	28 (−2)	32 (0)	35 (2)	38 (3)	44 (7)	49 (9)	56 (13)	54 (12)	48 (9)	43 (6)	34 (1)	30 (−1)	28 (−2)
Record low °F (°C)	22 (−6)	24 (−4)	26 (−3)	31 (−1)	36 (2)	40 (4)	48 (9)	47 (8)	37 (3)	32 (0)	25 (−4)	21 (−6)	21 (−6)
Average precipitation inches (mm)	3.32 (84)	3.61 (92)	2.85 (72)	1.12 (28)	0.35 (8.9)	0.05 (1.3)	0.02 (0.51)	0.04 (1.0)	0.18 (4.6)	0.58 (15)	1.25 (32)	2.76 (70)	16.13 (409.31)
Average relative humidity (%)	62	65	61	57	56	52	46	47	49	51	55	59	55
Average dew point °F (°C)	40 (4)	42 (6)	43 (6)	45 (7)	49 (9)	52 (11)	55 (13)	56 (13)	54 (12)	48 (9)	41 (5)	39 (4)	47 (8)
Source: National Weather Service / NOAA Climate Archives

=== Wildfires ===
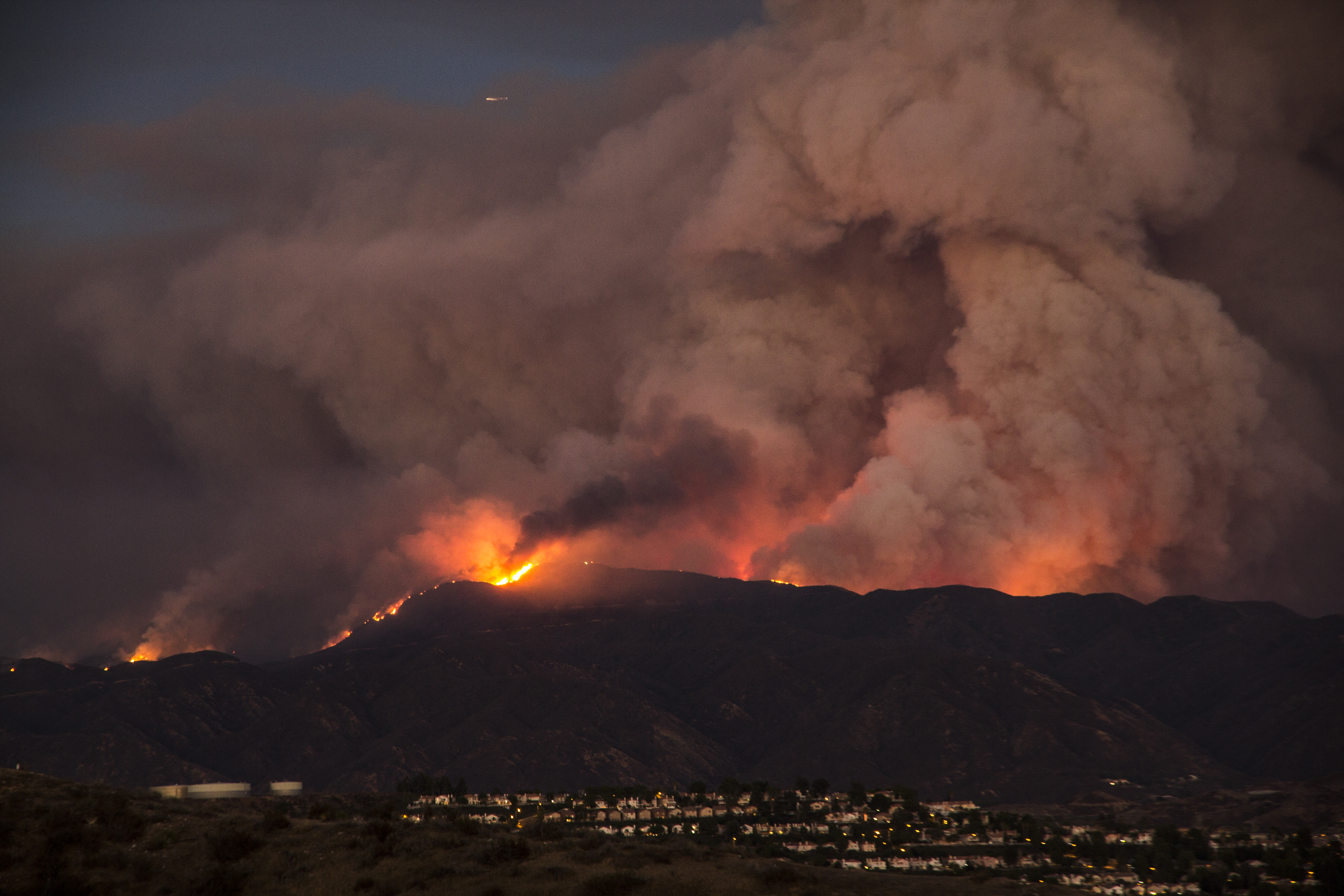
The Sand Fire burning in the foothills of the San Gabriel Mountains in July 2016. Wildfires of varying sizes occur periodically around the valley.

Characterized by dry hills covered in brush and chaparral, Santa Clarita is susceptible to wildfires. Although wildfires are most common in summer and fall, they can occur throughout the year during drought conditions, such as in December 2017 and January 2025. Wildfire risk is highest when Santa Ana winds blow through the area from the Mojave Desert.

Notable wildfires in the Santa Clarita Valley include the Rye Fire, Buckweed Fire, Sand Fire, and Tick Fire.

=== Ecology ===
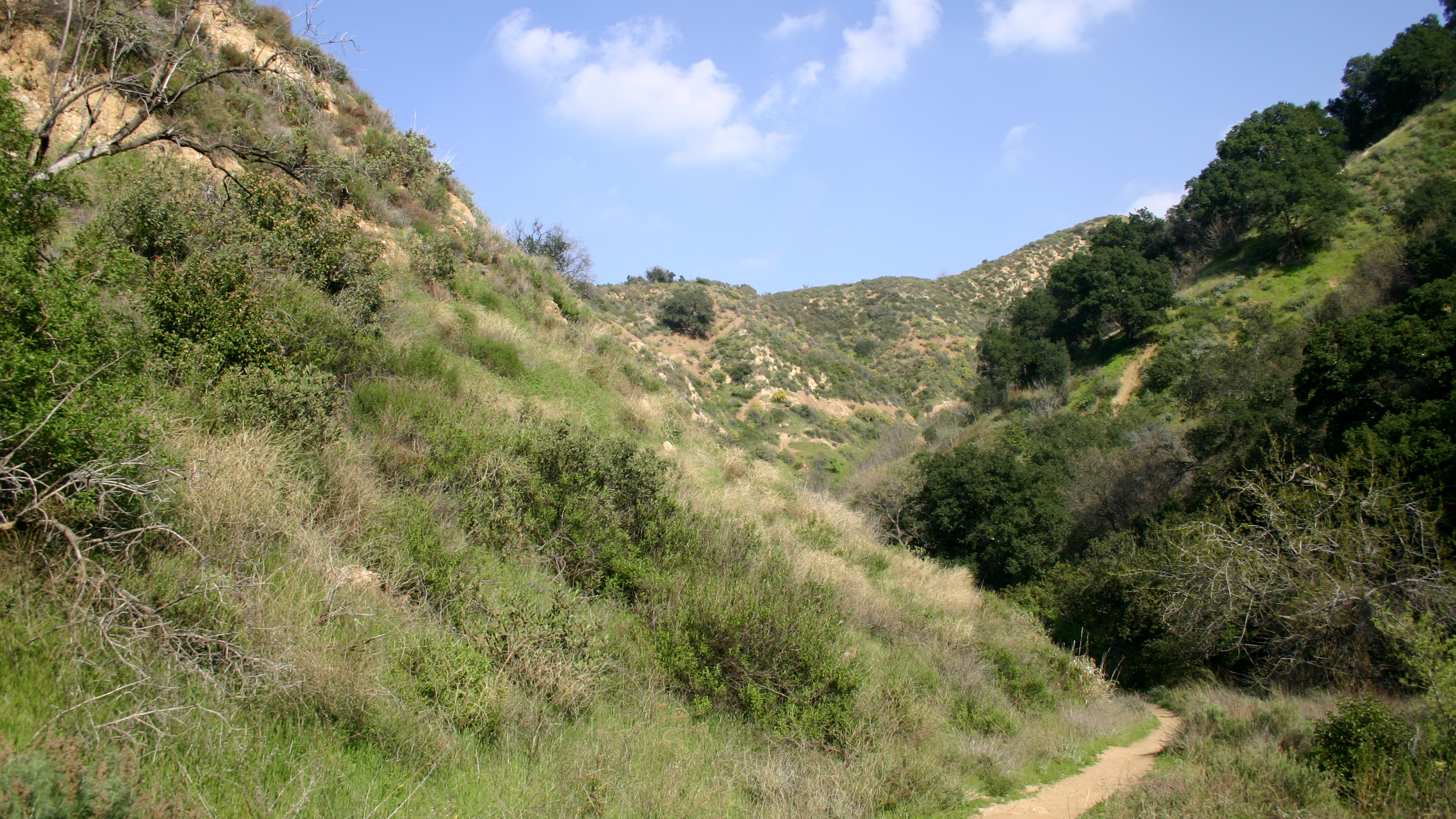
Coastal sage and chaparral typical of the southwestern and central portions of the city

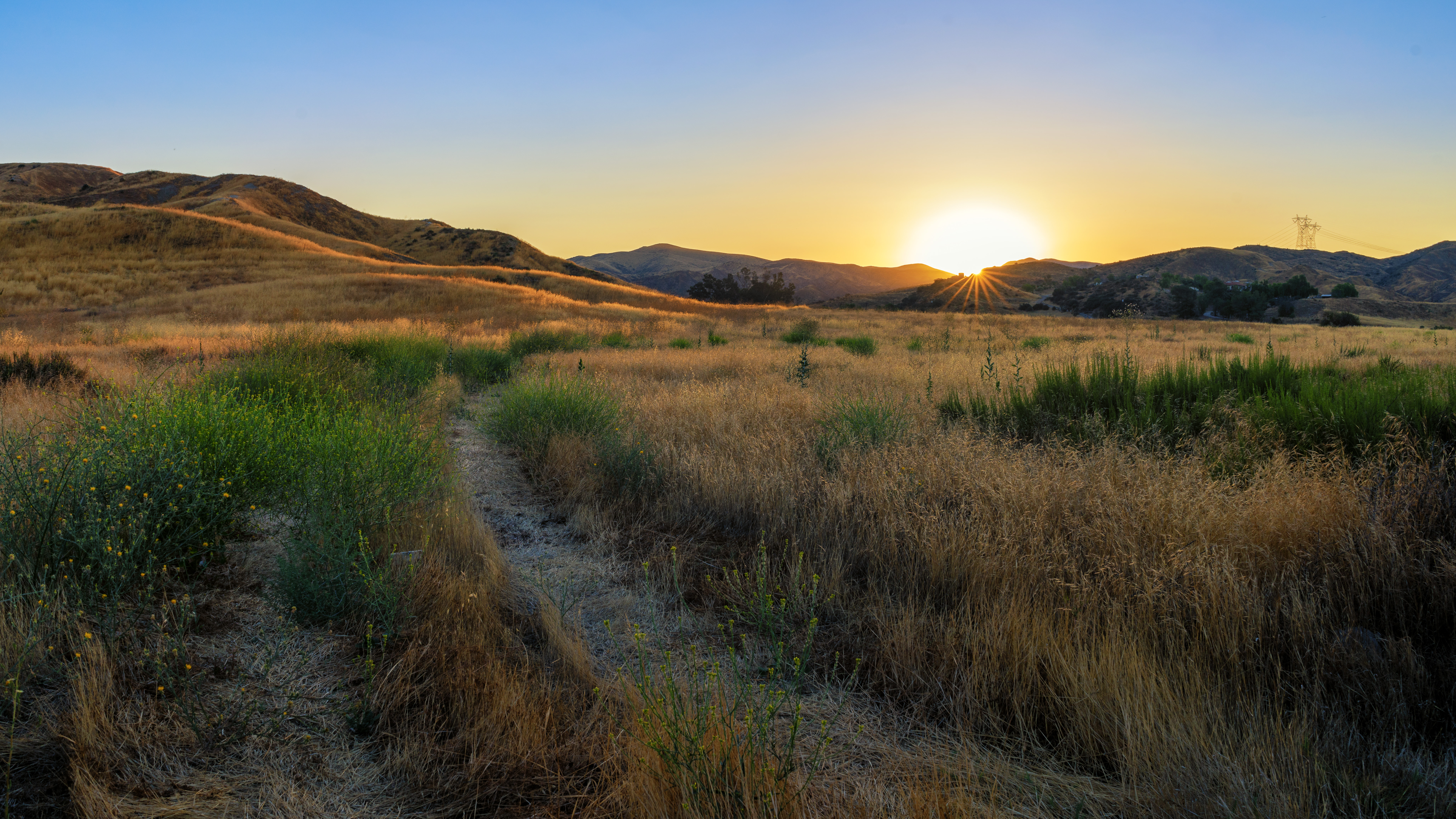
Montane chaparral typical of the northern and eastern foothills

Santa Clarita is located along the boundary between the WWF-designated California coastal sage and chaparral ecoregion to the southwest, and California montane chaparral and woodlands ecoregion to the northeast.

=== Cityscape ===
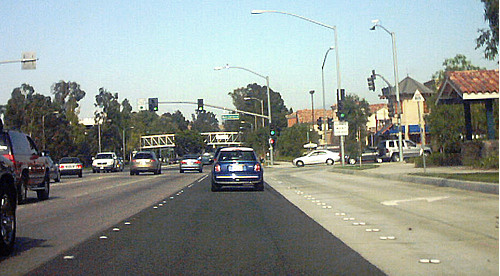
A stretch of Valencia Boulevard in July 2004, near the Valencia Town Center. The bridge in the distance carries a paseo (a type of dedicated pedestrian pathway) over the roadway.

Although generally considered a large suburb of Greater Los Angeles, the city of Santa Clarita consists of four distinct communities: Canyon Country, Newhall, Saugus, and Valencia. Each community is characterized by a mixture of single-family homes, townhomes, apartment buildings, condominiums, and commercial and industrial areas. Valencia, a master-planned community, contains the city's largest shopping center (Valencia Town Center) and most of the city's corporate headquarters, government buildings, hotels, and tallest buildings. The neighborhoods in Canyon Country and Saugus are characterized by a wide age range, from older developments dating from the 1960s or earlier to new developments built in the 21st century. Newhall, the oldest area of the city, has also experienced new commercial and industrial development. Throughout the city, single-family suburban tract housing predominates, with apartment and condominium complexes along major thoroughfares. Many communities in Santa Clarita, especially in newer areas, have homeowner associations, and some are gated. Placerita Canyon and Sand Canyon are equestrian communities with large custom ranch homes.

Communities just outside the city limits include Agua Dulce, Castaic, Stevenson Ranch, unincorporated Valencia, and Val Verde. All residents of the Santa Clarita Valley, both inside and outside the city, may use either their neighborhood or "Santa Clarita" for their mailing addresses.

== Demographics ==
Historical population
Census	Pop.	Note	%±
1950	2,895		—
1960	15,212		425.5%
1970	50,086		229.3%
1980	66,730		33.2%
1990	110,642		65.8%
2000	151,088		36.6%
2010	176,320		16.7%
2020	228,673		29.7%
2024 (est.)	229,159	▲	0.2%
U.S. Decennial Census; 1850–1870 1880-1890; 1900 1910 1920; 1930 1940 1950; 1960 1970 1980; 1990 2000 2010 2020

Santa Clarita, California – Racial and ethnic composition Note: the US Census treats Hispanic/Latino as an ethnic category. This table excludes Latinos from the racial categories and assigns them to a separate category. Hispanics/Latinos may be of any race.
Race / Ethnicity (NH = Non-Hispanic)	Pop 1990	Pop 2000	Pop 2010	Pop 2020	% 1990	% 2000	% 2010	% 2020
White alone (NH)	89,203	104,646	98,838	101,794	80.62%	69.26%	56.06%	44.52%
Black or African American alone (NH)	1,654	2,957	5,157	9,046	1.49%	1.96%	2.92%	3.96%
Native American or Alaska Native alone (NH)	573	528	435	458	0.52%	0.35%	0.25%	0.20%
Asian alone (NH)	4,277	7,758	14,689	26,797	3.87%	5.13%	8.33%	11.72%
Pacific Islander alone (NH)	x	198	235	291	x	0.13%	0.13%	0.13%
Some Other Race alone (NH)	216	337	458	1,309	0.20%	0.22%	0.26%	0.57%
Mixed Race or Multi-Racial (NH)	x	3,696	4,567	10,243	x	2.45%	2.59%	4.48%
Hispanic or Latino (any race)	14,564	30,968	51,941	78,735	13.16%	20.50%	29.46%	34.43%
Total	110,642	151,088	176,320	228,673	100.00%	100.00%	100.00%	100.00%

Historically, Santa Clarita's population has been predominantly non-Hispanic White. Starting in the 1960s and continuing into the 1990s, white Americans, primary those from affluent backgrounds, began migrating from Los Angeles to suburban cities such as Santa Clarita, Calabasas, Malibu, Thousand Oaks, and Camarillo. However, from 1980s onward, the city's population has become increasingly diverse. The non-Hispanic White percentage of the population has dropped from 80.6% in 1990 to 44.5% in 2020. The total White population (including those of Hispanic heritage) has proportionately decreased from 87.3% in 1990 to 50.8% in 2020. Nevertheless, non-Hispanic Whites remain the largest ethnic group in the city, and Santa Clarita's non-Hispanic white percentage is higher than the California statewide average of 34.7%, but lower than the national average of 57.8%.

Santa Clarita's population growth rate has historically outpaced county, state, and national averages. In 2019, Santa Clarita was ranked 20th out of 515 U.S. cities in population and economic growth, and was second among California cities. During the 2010 census, Santa Clarita was the fourth-largest city in Los Angeles County; however, it has since surpassed Glendale as the county's third-largest city. However, in 2021, the United States Census Bureau estimates showed a 2% decline in the city's population, in line with the rest of Los Angeles County. It is the largest city in Los Angeles County north of the Newhall Pass.

As in many United States cities, different ethnic groups in Santa Clarita are concentrated in different areas. The Hispanic population is somewhat higher in Canyon Country and Newhall, while the non-Hispanic white population is somewhat higher in Saugus and Valencia. Median household income is highest in Valencia, Stevenson Ranch, northern Saugus, and select areas of Canyon Country such as Fair Oaks Ranch and Sand Canyon. The lowest median household incomes are around Newhall Avenue in Newhall and Jakes Way in Canyon Country.

As a part of Los Angeles County, Santa Clarita is located within the Los Angeles-Long Beach-Anaheim, CA metropolitan statistical area and the Los Angeles-Long Beach, CA combined statistical area.

=== 2024 ===
As of the 2024 American Community Survey, the city's estimated population was 229,175. The city's population was 68.9% white (42.8% white alone, 37.3% non-Hispanic white), 17.0% Asian, 8.8% black or African American, and 3.4% Native American. 36.3% of the population were Hispanic or Latino of any race. The median age was 39.5 years.

The median household income in Santa Clarita in 2024 was $123,011. 24.3% of the city's population was born outside the United States. 41.9% of residents age 25 or older had a bachelor's degree or higher. Among residents 5 years of age or older, 61.0% spoke English as their primary language at home, 25.1% spoke Spanish, 4.4% spoke other Indo-European languages, 7.6% spoke Asian or Pacific island languages, and 2.0% spoke other languages.

=== 2020 ===
As of the 2020 United States census, Santa Clarita had a population of 228,673. The city's racial makeup was 50.8% white (44.5% non-Hispanic white), 12.0% Asian (11.7% non-Hispanic), 4.2% black or African American (4.0% non-Hispanic), 1.0% Native American, and 0.1% Pacific Islanders. 34.4% of the population were Hispanic or Latino of any race. Of the city's 78,586 housing units, 1,894 (2.4%) were vacant.

Approximately 129,905 residents (56.8% of the city population) lived north of the Santa Clara River, and 98,768 residents (43.2%) lived south of the river.

=== 2010 ===
The 2010 United States census reported that Santa Clarita had a population of 176,320. The population density was 3,340.6 inhabitants per square mile (1,289.8/km^{2}). The racial makeup of Santa Clarita was 125,005 (70.9%) White (56.1% Non-Hispanic White), 5,623 (3.2%) African American, 1,013 (0.6%) Native American, 15,025 (8.5%) Asian (3.4% Filipino, 1.7% Korean, 0.8% Indian, 0.8% Chinese, 0.6% Japanese, 0.3% Vietnamese, 0.9% Other Asian), 272 (0.2%) Pacific Islander, 21,169 (12.0%) from other races, and 8,213 (4.7%) from two or more races. There were 51,941 people of Hispanic or Latino origin, of any race (29.5% of the population).

The census reported that 174,910 people (99.2% of the population) lived in households, 1,281 (0.7%) lived in non-institutionalized group quarters, and 129 (0.1%) were institutionalized. There were 59,507 households, out of which 24,677 (41.5%) had children under the age of 18 living in them, 34,126 (57.3%) were opposite-sex married couples living together, 6,888 (11.6%) had a female householder with no husband present, 3,322 (5.6%) had a male householder with no wife present. There were 3,134 (5.3%) unmarried opposite-sex partnerships, and 484 (0.8%) same-sex married couples or partnerships. 11,634 households (19.6%) were made up of individuals, and 4,335 (7.3%) had someone living alone who was 65 years of age or older. The average household size was 2.94. There were 44,336 families (74.5% of all households); the average family size was 3.37.

In terms of age, the population included 46,180 people (26.2%) under the age of 18, 17,565 people (10.0%) aged 18 to 24, 47,788 people (27.1%) aged 25 to 44, 47,936 people (27.2%) aged 45 to 64, and 16,851 people (9.6%) who were 65 years of age or older. The median age was 36.2 years. For every 100 females, there were 97.1 males. For every 100 females age 18 and over, there were 94.0 males.

There were 62,055 housing units at an average density of 1,175.7 per square mile (453.9/km^{2}), of which 42,335 (71.1%) were owner-occupied, and 17,172 (28.9%) were occupied by renters. The homeowner vacancy rate was 1.4%; the rental vacancy rate was 6.0%. 124,532 people (70.6% of the population) lived in owner-occupied housing units and 50,378 people (28.6%) lived in rental housing units.

According to the Census Bureau, Santa Clarita had a median household income of $82,607, with 9.5% of the population living below the federal poverty line.

=== Religion ===
Religion in Santa Clarita
religion	percent
Christianity	50.5%
Roman Catholicism	37%
Baptist	2%
Pentecostalism	1.8%
Mormonism	1.6%
Methodism	1.2%
Other Christians	5.2%
Judaism	1.1%
Islam	0.7%
Eastern religions	1.1%

According to bestplaces.net, 53.4% of Santa Clarita's population is religious. Christians comprise 50.5% of the city's population. Of these, 37% are Catholic, 2% are Baptist, 1.8% are Pentecostal, 1.6% are Mormon, 1.2% are Methodist, and 5.2% were other Christians. Among non-Christians, 1.1% of Santa Clarita residents are Jewish, 0.7% are Muslim, are 1.1% follow Eastern religions.

Christianity is the dominant religion in Santa Clarita, and the city has over 40 Christian churches of the Catholic, Baptist, Lutheran, Methodist, Seventh-day Adventist, Episcopal, Orthodox, Pentecostal, and Reformed denominations as well as non-denominational churches. There are also smaller communities of Jews, Muslims, and Hindus.

=== Homelessness ===
In June 2020, the Los Angeles Homeless Services Authority reported 168 homeless people in Santa Clarita, down from 258 in 2019. The Bridge to Home organization provides assistance for homeless people in the valley. Its administrative offices are located on Newhall Avenue in Newhall, and its client housing shelter is on Drayton Street in Saugus. Santa Clarita's percentage of homeless people is low compared to Los Angeles County as a whole. (Note: The CBS Los Angeles article in the previous reference reported 66,436 homeless people in Los Angeles County in January 2020, 0.66% of the county's total 2019 population of 10,039,107. Santa Clarita's 2020 homeless population was 168, which when divided by the city's 2019 population of 212,979 yields a homeless percentage of just 0.078%.)

=== Crime ===
Santa Clarita has a relatively low crime rate. The city's violent crime rate is about one-third of the national average and 51% of the California statewide average. In 2020, the home security site Safety ranked Santa Clarita the seventh-safest city in California, specifically mentioning the low property crime rate. Then-mayor Cameron Smyth credited this to the "diligence" of the Santa Clarita Valley Sheriff's Station.

Nevertheless, some of the poorer neighborhoods of Santa Clarita have struggled with crime. The apartment and condominium complexes along Jakes Way in Canyon Country (south of the Santa Clara River, east of Sierra Highway, north of the Metrolink railroad line, and west of State Route 14) have seen some of the highest crime rates in the city. Gangs such as Brown Familia and Newhall 13 are active in parts of Canyon Country and Newhall.

Other past incidents have included a shootout in 1970 known as the Newhall incident, the Stevenson Ranch shootout in 2001, and the Saugus High School shooting in 2019.

== Government and politics ==
According to the California Secretary of State, as of February 10, 2019, Santa Clarita has 135,052 registered voters. Of those, 46,096 (34.1%) are registered Democrats, 45,725 (33.9%) are registered Republicans, and 35,764 (26.5%) have declined to state a political party.

In presidential elections, Santa Clarita has historically been a Republican stronghold. However, it has shifted toward the Democratic Party in recent years. Democrats Hillary Clinton, Joe Biden, and Kamala Harris won the city in 2016, 2020, and 2024 respectively, even as Harris lost both the election and the popular vote. Santa Clarita remains one of the most conservative cities in Los Angeles County, having voted Democratic by much smaller margins than the county and state as a whole.

Santa Clarita city vote by party in presidential elections
Year	Democratic	Republican	Other
2024	49.95% 57,583	47.21% 54,413	2.84% 3,273
2020	53.07% 63,507	44.93% 53,768	1.99% 2,388
2016	48.53% 42,316	45.33% 39,523	6.14% 5,355
2012	45.10% 32,789	52.32% 38,033	2.58% 1,874
2008	47.57% 35,379	50.32% 37,422	2.1% 1,564
2004	39.26% 25,657	59.68% 39,007	1.06% 695
2000	41.76% 18,607	54.79% 24,411	3.45% 1,538
1996	38.2% 15,136	48.56% 19,240	13.24% 5,246
1992	33.87% 14,780	36.94% 16,120	29.18% 12,733
1988	29.97% 11,722	68.9% 26,947	1.12% 439

=== Local government ===
The City of Santa Clarita is a general law city and as such is governed by a council–manager form of government. The city council is made up of five council members. Each year the council selects one of its members to serve as mayor, a largely ceremonial position. Mayors are not directly elected. In March 2020, the city council declared its intention to switch to district-based elections. In 2024, Santa Clarita held its first district-based election for Districts 1 and 3. In 2026, the remaining three at-large elected councilmembers will switch to district-based voting.

The city hall is located at 23920 Valencia Boulevard, across the street from the Valencia Town Center.

The city council has five members.

Position	Name
Mayor	Laurene Weste
Mayor Pro Tem (District 1)	Patsy Ayala
Councilmember (District 3)	Jason Gibbs
Councilmember (At-large)	Marsha McLean
Councilmember (At-large)	Bill Miranda

According to the city's Comprehensive Annual Financial Report for fiscal year 2019–20, the city's various funds included $116.3 million in revenues, $112.6 million in expenditures, $1.482 billion in total assets, and $217.2 million in total liabilities.

The structure of the management and coordination of city services

City Department	Director
City Manager	Ken Striplin
Assistant City Manager	Frank Oviedo
City Attorney	Joe Montes
Director of Administrative Services	Jerrid McKenna
Director of Community Development	Jason Crawford
Director of Economic Development	Tom Cole
Director of Human Resources & Library Services	Kristi Hobrecker
Director of Neighborhood Services	Michael Villegas
Director of Parks, Recreation & Community Services	Janine Prado
Director of Public Works	Mike Hennawy

==== List of mayors ====
Santa Clarita has had 15 mayors since its incorporation, serving 35 terms.

Name	Term
Howard P. "Buck" McKeon	December 1987 – December 1988
Janice "Jan" Heidt	December 1988 – December 1989
Jo Anne Darcy	December 1989 – December 1990
Carl Boyer III	December 1990 – December 1991
Jill Klajic	December 1991 – December 1992
Janice "Jan" Heidt	December 1992 – December 1993
George Pederson	December 1993 – December 1994
Jo Anne Darcy	December 1994 – December 1995
Carl Boyer III	December 1995 – December 1996
Hamilton "Clyde" Smith	December 1996 – December 1997
Janice "Jan" Heidt	December 1997 – December 1998
Jo Anne Darcy	December 1998 – December 2000
Laurene Weste	December 2000 – December 2001
Frank Ferry	December 2001 – December 2002
Cameron Smyth	December 2002 – December 2003
Robert "Bob" Kellar	December 2003 – December 2004
Cameron Smyth	December 2004 – December 2005
Laurene Weste	December 2005 – December 2006
Marsha McLean	December 2006 – December 2007
Robert Kellar	December 2007 – December 2008
Frank Ferry	December 2008 – December 2009
Laurene Weste	December 2009 – December 2010
Marsha McLean	December 2010 – December 2011
Laurie Ender	December 2011 – April 2012
Frank Ferry	April 2012 – December 2012
Robert Kellar	December 2012 – December 2013
Laurene Weste	December 2013 – December 2014
Marsha McLean	December 2014 – December 2015
Robert Kellar	December 2015 – December 2016
Cameron Smyth	December 2016 – December 2017
Laurene Weste	December 2017 – December 2018
Marsha McLean	December 2018 – December 2019
Cameron Smyth	December 2019 – December 2020
Bill Miranda	December 2020 – December 2021
Laurene Weste	December 2021 – December 2022
Jason Gibbs	December 2022 – December 2023
Cameron Smyth	December 2023 – December 2024
Bill Miranda	December 2024 – December 2025
Laurene Weste	December 2025 – present

=== County, state and federal representation ===
In the Los Angeles County Board of Supervisors, Santa Clarita is in the 5th district which is represented by Republican Kathryn Barger.

In the United States House of Representatives, Santa Clarita is in California's 27th congressional district, represented by Democrat George T. Whitesides.

In the California State Legislature, Santa Clarita is in the 23rd senatorial district, represented by Republican Suzette Martinez Valladares, and California's 40th State Assembly district, represented by Democrat Pilar Schiavo.

California is represented by US Senators Adam Schiff and Alex Padilla, both Democrats.

== Education ==
=== Elementary schools ===
Santa Clarita elementary school students (grades TK/K-6) are served by four elementary school districts.

- Castaic Union School District: serves Castaic, Val Verde, and a small residential and mostly commercial/industrial portion of northwestern Valencia.
- Newhall School District: serves Stevenson Ranch, Newhall, and southern Valencia.
- Saugus Union School District: serves Saugus, northern and central Valencia, and western Canyon Country.
- Sulphur Springs School District: serves the majority of Canyon Country.

These four school districts include 37 elementary schools and one middle school (Castaic Middle School, administered by Castaic Union School District).

=== Junior high and high schools ===
With the exception of Castaic Middle School, all junior high and high schools (grades 7–12) serving Santa Clarita are part of the William S. Hart Union High School District. The district includes seven general-education high schools (Canyon, Castaic, Golden Valley, Hart, Saugus, Valencia, and West Ranch) and six general-education junior high schools (Arroyo Seco, La Mesa, Placerita, Rancho Pico, Rio Norte, and Sierra Vista). All Hart District schools are located within Santa Clarita city limits, except for Castaic High School in unincorporated Castaic, and Rancho Pico Junior High and West Ranch High School in unincorporated Stevenson Ranch; however, these schools also serve portions of the city. The seven aforementioned high schools in the Hart District compete in the Foothill League athletic conference. U.S. News & World Report has ranked Hart District high schools in the top 12% in the nation. The district's headquarters are located along Centre Pointe Parkway.

Hart District also includes seven special schools: a middle college high school (Academy of the Canyons), on the College of the Canyons campus; the alternative high schools Bowman and Learning Post, with adjacent campuses along Centre Pointe Parkway; Santa Clarita Valley International Charter School (SCVi) in Castaic; the Opportunities for Learning (OFL) charter school, with campuses in Canyon Country and Valencia; and Golden Oak Adult School.

=== Private schools ===
Private schools in Santa Clarita include Santa Clarita Christian School, Trinity Classical Academy, Legacy Christian Academy, La Petite Academy, Our Lady of Perpetual Help School, Guidepost Montessori, and Tutor Time. Guidepost Montessori and Tutor Time have two campuses in the city.

=== Colleges and universities ===
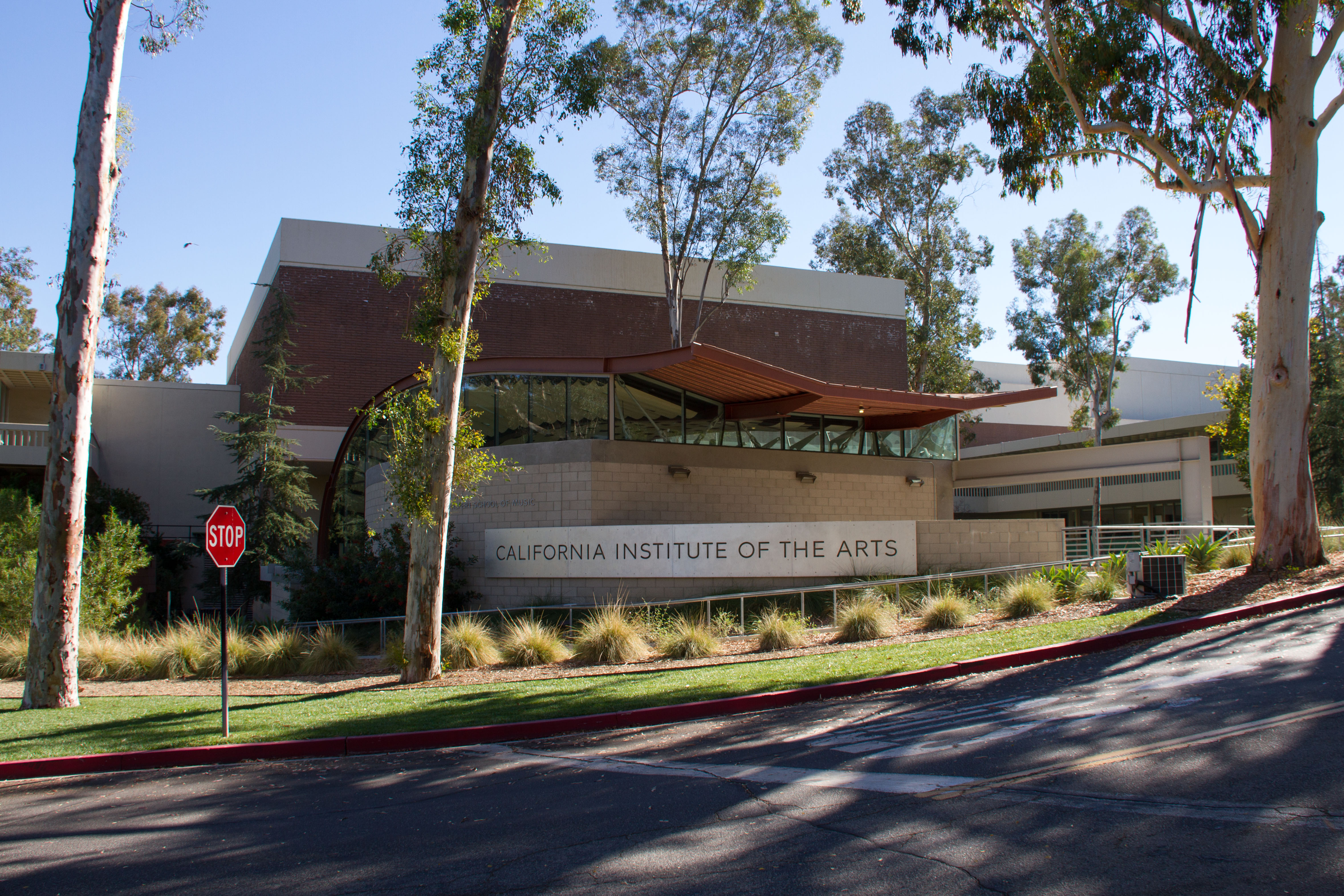
California Institute of the Arts in Valencia

The city is home to California Institute of the Arts (CalArts), a private art university. Founded in 1961 by Walt Disney, Roy O. Disney, and Nelbert Chouinard, CalArts was the first college or university created specifically for students of visual and performing arts. It was created by the merger of Chouinard Art Institute and the Los Angeles Conservatory of Music. It relocated to its current Valencia campus in 1971, on McBean Parkway near Interstate 5. CalArts has produced numerous renowned actors and musicians including Brad Bird, Tim Burton, Julia Holter, John Lasseter, Marina Rosenfeld, Andrew Stanton, and Carl Stone among others. CalArts is currently administered by president Ravi Rajan.

The Master's University is a non-denominational, Christian liberal arts university based in the Placerita Canyon neighborhood of Newhall. Founded as Los Angeles Baptist College and Seminary in 1927, it moved to Santa Clarita in 1961 and later adopted the name The Master's College and then The Master's University. The university also operates The Master's Seminary in Sun Valley, Los Angeles. The university is currently led by Interim President Abner Chou, following the resignation of Dr. Sam Horn in February 2021. John F. MacArthur served as president from 1985 to 2019; he currently serves as chancellor.

College of the Canyons (COC) is a public community college with two campuses. The main campus is located in Valencia, at the southwest corner of Rockwell Canyon Road and Valencia Boulevard. The secondary Canyon Country campus is located on Sierra Highway between Skyline Ranch Road and Sand Canyon Road. The two COC campuses comprise the Santa Clarita Community College District of California Community Colleges.

Charter College has a campus at the intersection of Soledad Canyon Road and Hidaway Avenue in Canyon Country.

== Parks and recreation ==
=== Six Flags Magic Mountain ===
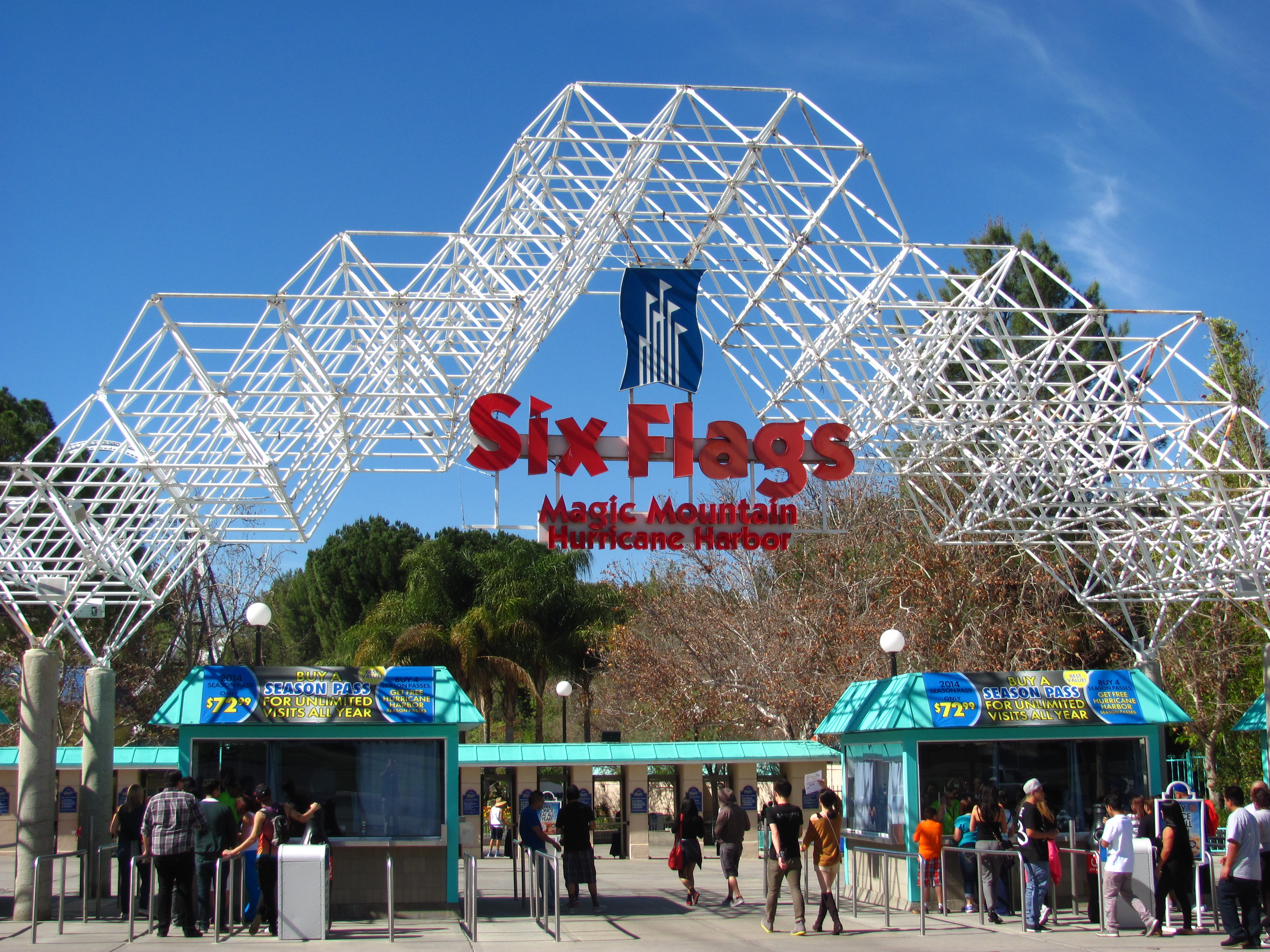
Entrance to Six Flags Magic Mountain in Valencia in 2014

One of the most well-known attractions in the Santa Clarita Valley is the Six Flags Magic Mountain theme park, located just outside the city limits. Six Flags occupies 262 acres of land on the west side of the valley, in unincorporated Valencia. It opened on May 29, 1971, as a development of the Newhall Land and Farming Company and SeaWorld Inc. It was sold to Six Flags in 1979. Six Flags Magic Mountain has 20 roller coasters, the most of any amusement park in the world. The park received an estimated 3.365 million visitors in 2017. It is one of 26 Six Flags properties in North America. The park's property also includes the 25-acre waterpark, Six Flags Hurricane Harbor, which operates from late spring to early fall.

=== City parks and facilities ===
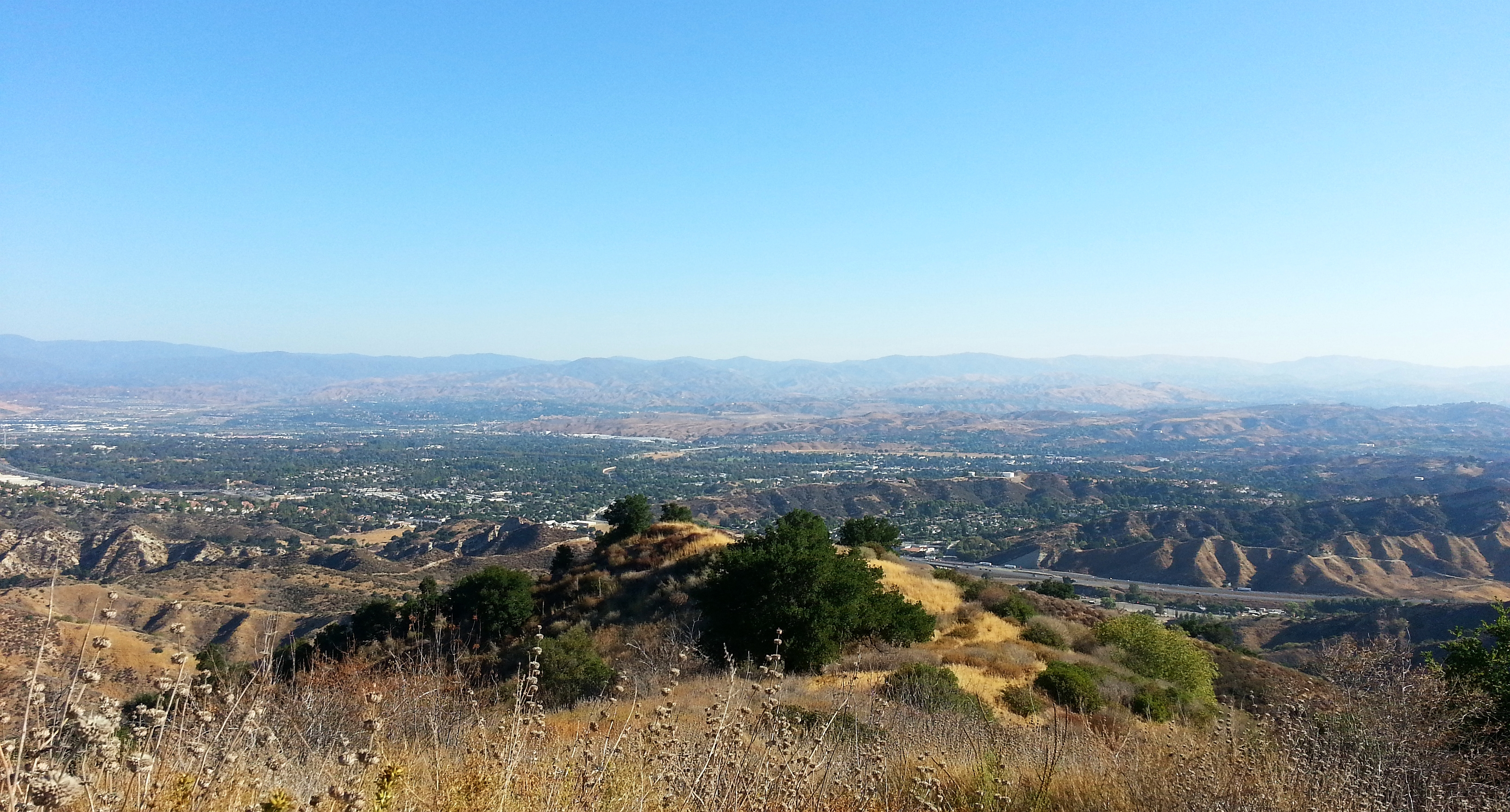
Overlooking Santa Clarita from Ed Davis Park in Newhall and Towsley Canyon

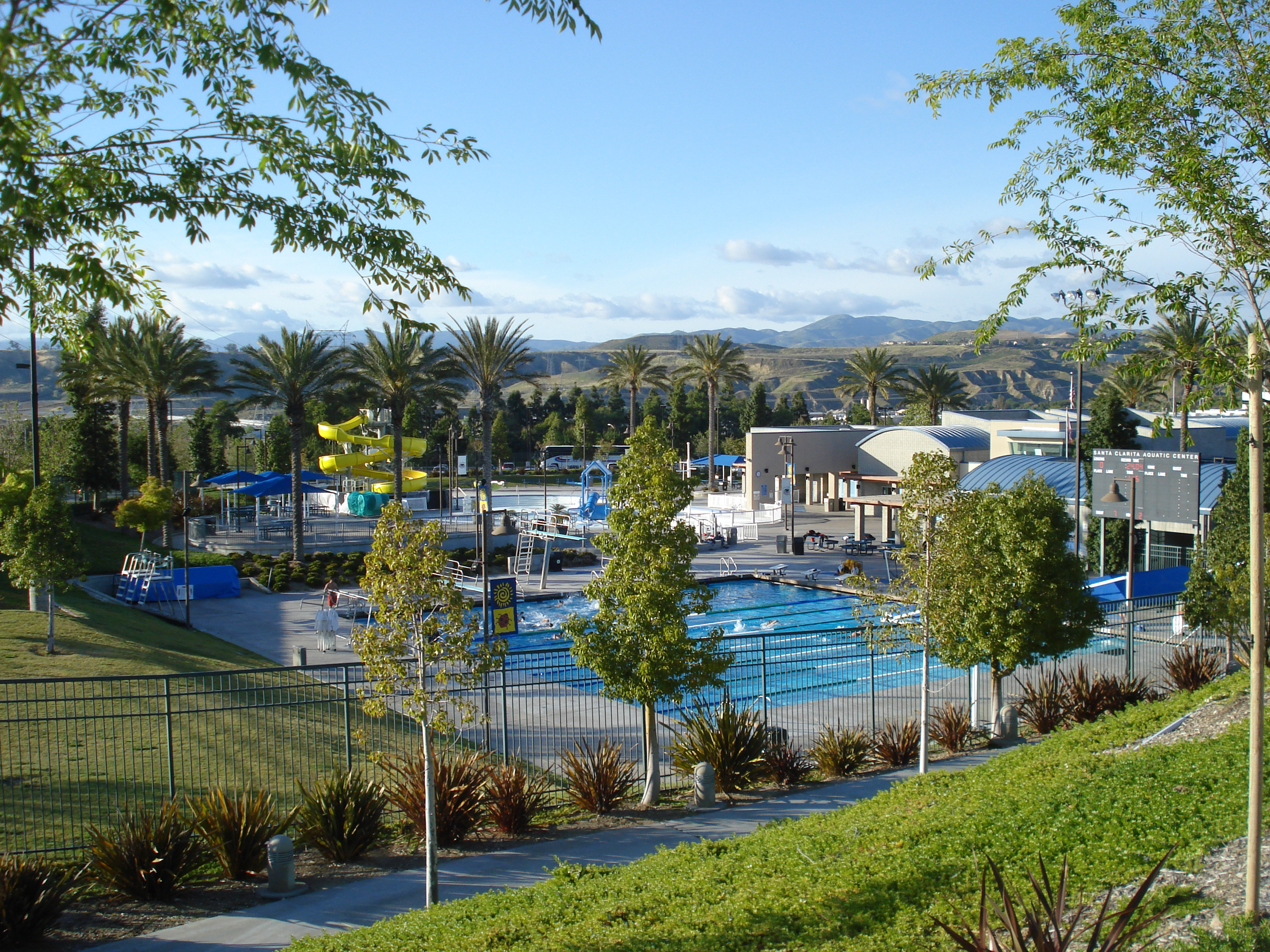
Santa Clarita Aquatics Center, part of the larger George A. Caravalho Sports Complex in Canyon Country

Since incorporation, the City of Santa Clarita's leadership has placed a priority on offering recreational facilities and programs. The city operates a park system which includes 38 parks scattered throughout the city. Many of the parks have lighted basketball and tennis courts as well as baseball, softball, and soccer fields. The largest city park in Santa Clarita is Central Park in Saugus, on the south side of Bouquet Canyon Road, which includes four outdoor basketball courts; several baseball, softball, and soccer fields; a community garden; disc golf course; cross country course; and the Central Bark dog park.

The George A. Caravalho Sports Complex, located near the intersection of Golden Valley Road and Centre Pointe Parkway in Canyon Country, includes a gymnasium with two indoor, full-sized basketball courts, four pickleball courts, two volleyball courts, two futsal courts, and four racquetball courts. The Sports Complex includes the City of Santa Clarita Activities Center (a.k.a. The Centre) which contains rooms for banquets and meetings. The Sports Complex also includes the Santa Clarita Aquatic Center, which includes three large swimming pools and several water slides; the Trek Bike Park of Santa Clarita covering 7 acres including BMX and mountain biking trails; the Santa Clarita Skate Park; and the Canine Country dog park. Many of the city's recreational programs are held at the Sports Complex.

Tesoro Adobe Historic Park was the home of actor Harry Carey, and has been described as "the first tourist attraction in Santa Clarita." It is located within the City of Santa Clarita in the community of Tesoro del Valle. In June 2005, Montalvo Properties LLC, the developer of Tesoro del Valle, donated the park to Los Angeles County which was subsequently transferred to the City of Santa Clarita in 2022 after Tesoro Del Valle was annexed into the City of Santa Clarita.

Over the past several years, the city has cosponsored a summer concert series in cooperation with various local businesses. These concerts, offering a variety of musicians, are offered free of charge and take place on weekends in Central Park. The concert was canceled in 2020 due to the COVID-19 pandemic. The city offers a wide variety of fee-based and free classes and programs in a variety of locations throughout the year.

The city operates three community centers: the Newhall Community Center, adjacent to the Newhall Metrolink station; the Canyon Country Community Center (CCCC), at the northeast corner of Sierra Highway and Soledad Canyon Road; and the Valencia Community Center located on McBean Parkway at the former YMCA. The Canyon Country Community Center was located at Sierra Highway and Flying Tiger Drive before its relocation in October 2021.

City-sponsored recreational programs are listed in the quarterly magazine Seasons, which is delivered to all residences within the city limits via mail.

The Santa Clarita Marathon is an annual race through the city's streets and paseos. First run in 1995, it is now considered a qualifying race for the Boston Marathon. Previously held in November, starting in 2022 it was permanently moved to February. Both the 2020 and 2022 marathons were canceled due to the COVID-19 pandemic; there was no 2021 marathon.

Santa Clarita was picked to host stages in the AMGEN Tour of California for a total of 9 years. It has hosted a total of 14 stages as of 2019.

Surrounded by three mountain ranges, the Santa Clarita area contains numerous hiking trails, in areas such as Agua Dulce Canyon, Central Park, East Walker Ranch, Elsmere Canyon, Golden Valley Ranch, Newhall Pass Open Space, Haskell Canyon Open Space, Quigley Canyon, East Canyon, Fish Canyon, San Francisquito Open Space, Tapia Canyon, Towsley Canyon, and Wildwood Canyon.

=== County parks ===
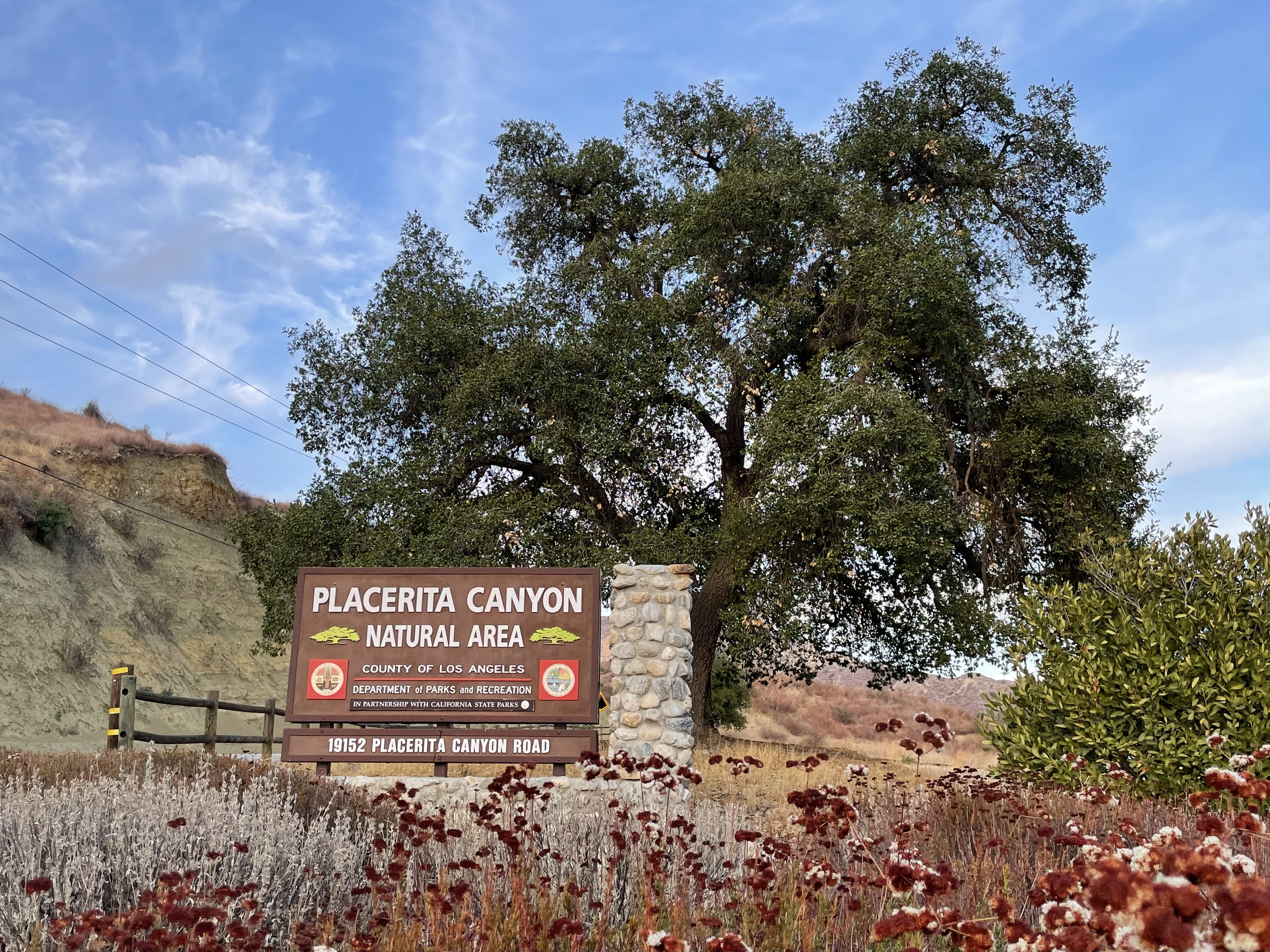
Entrance sign of Placerita Canyon State Park

The Los Angeles County Department of Parks and Recreation operates one park within the city of Santa Clarita, and one other within the city's sphere of influence.

William S. Hart Regional Park (effective July 1, 2025 the City of Santa Clarita will take over operations of the park) in Newhall includes the estate of silent film star William S. Hart, known as La Loma de los Vientos (The Hill of the Winds) and has hosted the annual Santa Clarita Cowboy Festival since 1994. The William S. Hart Museum, one of three Natural History Museums of Los Angeles County, is located on the grounds of Hart Park. It is the only Los Angeles County park located within the Santa Clarita city limits.

Placerita Canyon State Park is in an unincorporated area east of Newhall, in the western San Gabriel foothills on the southeast side of the Santa Clarita Valley. It is administered by the Los Angeles County Department of Parks and Recreation, in partnership with California State Parks. It features eight hiking trails, equestrian trails, waterfalls, the Oak of the Golden Dream, and the Walker Cabin. Its visitor center, known as Placerita Canyon Nature Center includes exhibits and descriptions of the flora and fauna of the region.

=== Other ===
The city is home to an ice rink known as The Cube—Ice and Entertainment Center (formerly Ice Station Valencia). It is used for ice skating and hockey. In 2020, Ice Station Valencia was on the brink of permanent closure due to COVID-19, until the city council unanimously voted to acquire the building for $14.2 million. On February 23, 2021, the city council reached an agreement with American Sports Entertainment Company and the Los Angeles Kings to operate the facility. The city renovated The Cube to include two large ice rinks (one NHL-size rink and one Olympic-sized rink) and one small ice rink known as The Pond. The rinks, covered with insulated floors, can also be used for conventions, business meetings, concerts, birthday parties, and filming. The Cube opened on April 12, 2021, with a ribbon-cutting ceremony. It is the home arena for the UCLA Bruins men's ice hockey team and is located along Smyth Drive in Valencia, across the street from Valencia High School.

MB2 Entertainment, previously known as Mountasia Family Fun Center, is an entertainment and recreation center located in Saugus, along Golden Triangle Road (a frontage road of Soledad Canyon Road) near its intersection with Golden Oak Road. It first opened in August 1995, and currently offers miniature golf, go-karts, bumper boats, laser tag, and video games. On March 15, 2020, it was forced to close due to the COVID-19 pandemic. In September, after nearly six months of closure, the owners sold the center. MB2 Group, which operates go-kart racing tracks, purchased the center in February 2021.

== Sports ==
The Santa Clarita Blue Heat is a women's pre-professional soccer team which plays in the USL W League. It was founded as the Ventura County Fusion in 2008 and played in the city of Ventura before relocating to Santa Clarita. Their home games are played at College of the Canyons.

The city is home to the Santa Clarita Flyers Hockey Club, a youth travel ice hockey program which competes in the Southern California Amateur Hockey Association and California Amateur Hockey Association and is based at The Cube Ice and Entertainment Center in Valencia. The UCLA Bruins men's ice hockey team also plays its home games at The Cube.

The Canyons Aquatic Club is a competitive swim team based in Santa Clarita affiliated with USA Swimming. Its home pool is located at College of the Canyons, with practice locations at the Santa Clarita Aquatics Center, Santa Clarita Park, Castaic Aquatic Center, North Oaks Park, and Newhall Park.

The Saugus Speedway, located along Soledad Canyon Road in Saugus, was a 0.33-mile (0.53 km) race track covering 35 acres (14 ha). It first opened in 1939 as Bonelli Stadium. The first stock car racing event on the speedway occurred in 1957. In 1995, the track was permanently closed. The speedway served as the venue for the Santa Clarita Swap Meet prior to its closure and planned redevelopment of the site.

Central Park contains a 3.1-mile (5.0 km) cross country course used by high school and college athletes to train and race.

The city includes four golf courses: Vista Valencia Golf Course and Valencia Country Club in Valencia, and Sand Canyon Country Club and Friendly Valley Golf Course in Canyon Country. The Oaks Club at Valencia is located in the Westridge area of Stevenson Ranch, adjacent to the city.

The Canyon Country Little League baseball and softball teams play their games on a field along Sierra Highway in unincorporated Canyon Country.

== Services ==
=== Law enforcement ===
Santa Clarita is a contract city, meaning it does not have its own police department and instead relies on county services. The Los Angeles County Sheriff's Department (LASD) operates the Santa Clarita Valley Sheriff's Station at 26201 Golden Valley Road, just south of the intersection of Golden Valley Road and Centre Pointe Parkway. Prior to its October 2021 relocation, the Santa Clarita Valley Sheriff's Station was located on Magic Mountain Parkway in Valencia.

The California Highway Patrol's Newhall office patrols the highways and streets of the Santa Clarita Valley. Despite being referred to as the Newhall office, its headquarters are actually located in unincorporated Valencia, along The Old Road just south of State Route 126. Its service area covers 772 square miles (2,000 km^{2}), including most of northwestern Los Angeles County, containing 204 miles (328 km) of freeways and 296 miles (476 km) of unincorporated roadways.

=== Water ===
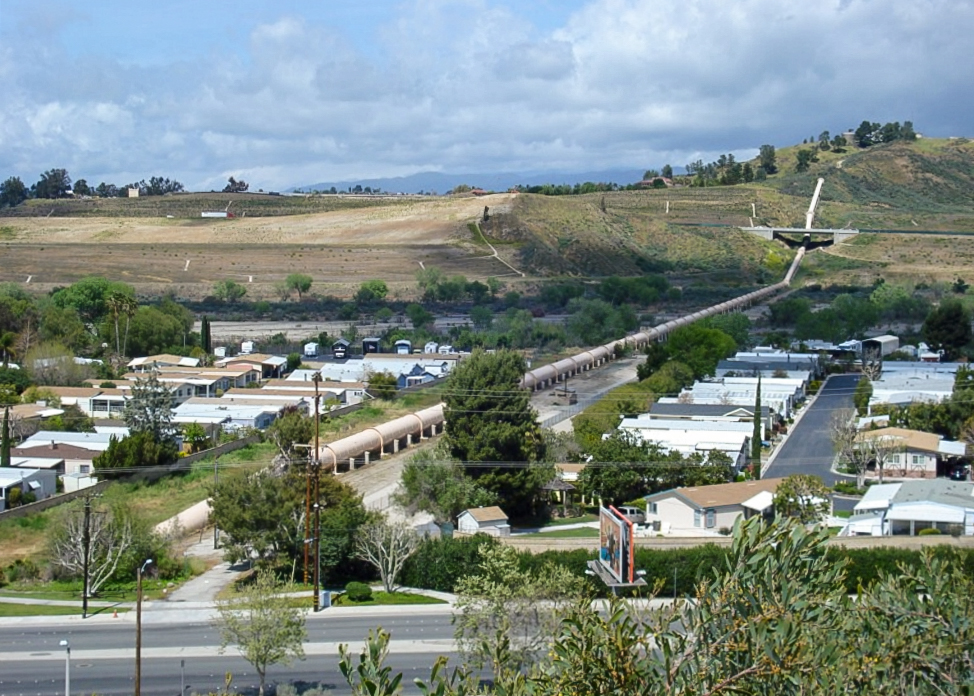
The Los Angeles Aqueduct emerges from beneath the Santa Clarita Valley Water Agency in Saugus (top right) and crosses the Santa Clara River.

Santa Clarita receives its water from the Santa Clarita Valley Water Agency, also known as SCV Water. The agency was formed on January 1, 2018, through the merger of three agencies: Castaic Lake Water Agency, Newhall County Water District, and the Valencia Water Company. The agency's service area covers about 195 square miles (510 km^{2}) and is home to 273,000 people. It is split into three water divisions—Santa Clarita, Newhall, and Valencia—descendants of the three original agencies. Its headquarters, adjacent to Central Park in Saugus, include a conservatory garden and learning center with over 350 plant species. The SCV Water Agency sources its water from the California Aqueduct, Castaic Lake, alluvial wells, and the Saugus Aquifer. The SCV Water Agency is currently involved in removing hazardous material from the Saugus Aquifer left behind by decades of munitions testing at the Whittaker-Bermite site (see History section above).

The Los Angeles Aqueduct passes through Santa Clarita on its way from the Owens Valley to Granada Hills, Los Angeles. It passes next to, and is visible from, the north-bound Golden State Freeway (Interstate 5); Saugus High School; and the Centre Pointe Business Park. However, Santa Clarita does not receive Los Angeles Aqueduct water–all of the aqueduct's water goes to the city of Los Angeles.

=== Public libraries ===
The city operates the Santa Clarita Public Library system, consisting of three libraries: the main office in Valencia, the Old Town Newhall Library in Newhall, and the Jo Anne Darcy Library in Canyon Country. The libraries offer books ranging from preschool to adult reading levels. In addition, each library has a variety of services for students, teachers, and home schoolers, including homework help, mental health, and employment resources, as well as community events. Passport acceptance services are also offered at each library branch. In addition to its three properties, the system includes an eLibrary. The main office in Valencia has a sculpture that says "IMAG NE"; when a person stands between the G and the N the word "IMAGINE" is spelled. The Santa Clarita library began a new Library Express mobile library experience on April 26th, 2025. This is a repurposed Santa Clarita Transit GO! Bus. It visits various locations within the city considered underserved by the three brick-and-mortar branches. It also appears at city events or upon request.

=== Health services ===
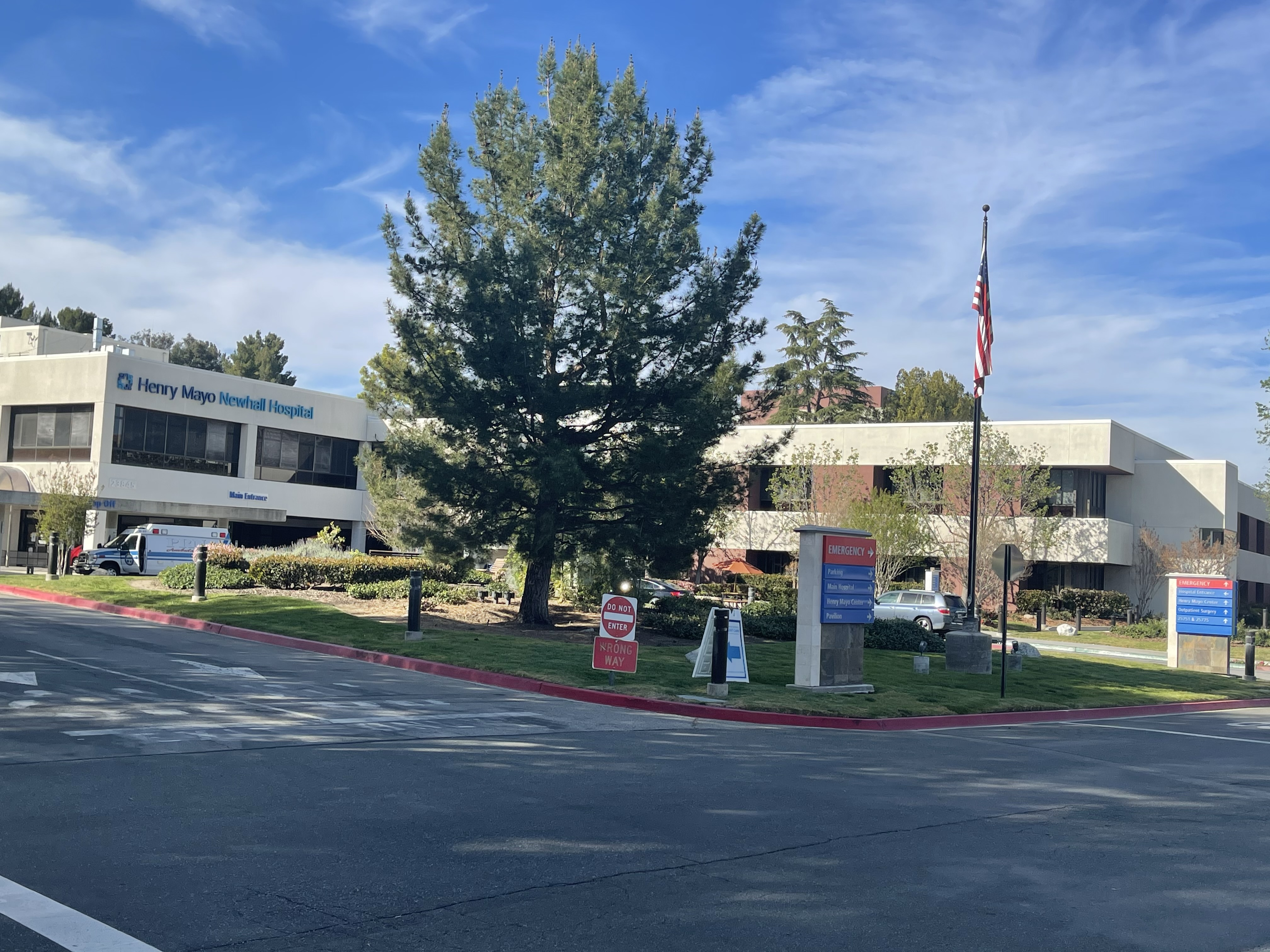
Henry Mayo Newhall Memorial Hospital in Newhall

Henry Mayo Newhall Memorial Hospital (commonly referred to as Henry Mayo Hospital), founded in 1975, is a Level II trauma center and hospital. It includes 357 beds, as well as a helipad, an urgent care center, inpatient facilities, a catheterization lab, a breast imaging center, disaster resource center, outpatient surgery center, and cardiac rehabilitation center. It is located in Valencia, along McBean Parkway at its intersections with Avenida Navarre and Orchard Village Road. The complex which contains Henry Mayo Hospital also includes medical institutions not affiliated with the hospital, such as Valencia Perinatal Services, Advanced Pain Management, UCLA Health, and an office of Heritage Sierra Medical Group. Henry Mayo also runs a fitness center along Town Center Drive, about 2 miles (3.2 km) north of the hospital.

Santa Clarita is also served by private health care providers such as Exer Urgent Care, Facey Medical Group, Kaiser Permanente, Concentra Urgent Care, and Providence Health & Services.

As part of Los Angeles County, Santa Clarita is under the jurisdiction of the Los Angeles County Department of Public Health. It does not have its own public health agency.

American Medical Response is contracted to service Santa Clarita, providing emergency medical transport, BLS-level care, and ALS-level care in conjunction with the Los Angeles County Fire Department. The company has four stations in the City of Santa Clarita, one in unincorporated Castaic, and one in Acton.

=== Electricity and gas ===
Santa Clarita does not have its own electricity or natural gas utilities. The city's electricity comes from Southern California Edison, and its natural gas comes from SoCalGas.

=== Fire ===
The city contracts with the Los Angeles County Fire Department for fire protection. The agency has eleven fire stations in the city of Santa Clarita, as well as one station in unincorporated Valencia, two in unincorporated Castaic, one in Val Verde, one in Stevenson Ranch, and one in Agua Dulce.

=== Post offices ===
The United States Postal Service operates four post offices in the city: at Creekside Road and McBean Parkway in central Valencia, on Tournament Road in southern Valencia, at Lyons Avenue near Peachland Avenue in Newhall, and at Soledad Canyon Road east of Sierra Highway in Canyon Country. Two post offices are located in the Santa Clarita Valley just outside the city limits, at The Old Road, which serves as the main post office for the area, and Towsley Canyon Road in unincorporated Newhall, and on Franklin Parkway in the Valencia Commerce Center. There is also a Contract Postal Unit located in the Saugus Drugs store at Bouquet and Haskell Canyon Roads.

=== Other ===
The California Department of Motor Vehicles has an office in Newhall, at the southwest corner of Lyons Avenue and Newhall Avenue, serving the entire Santa Clarita Valley.

== Economy ==
Companies based in Santa Clarita include Princess Cruises, Honda Performance Development, Precision Dynamics Corporation, HASA, and the American division of Advanced Bionics. Sunkist, Mechanix Wear, Remo, Newhall Land and Farming Company and WayForward are headquartered just outside the city in unincorporated Valencia.

=== Largest employers ===
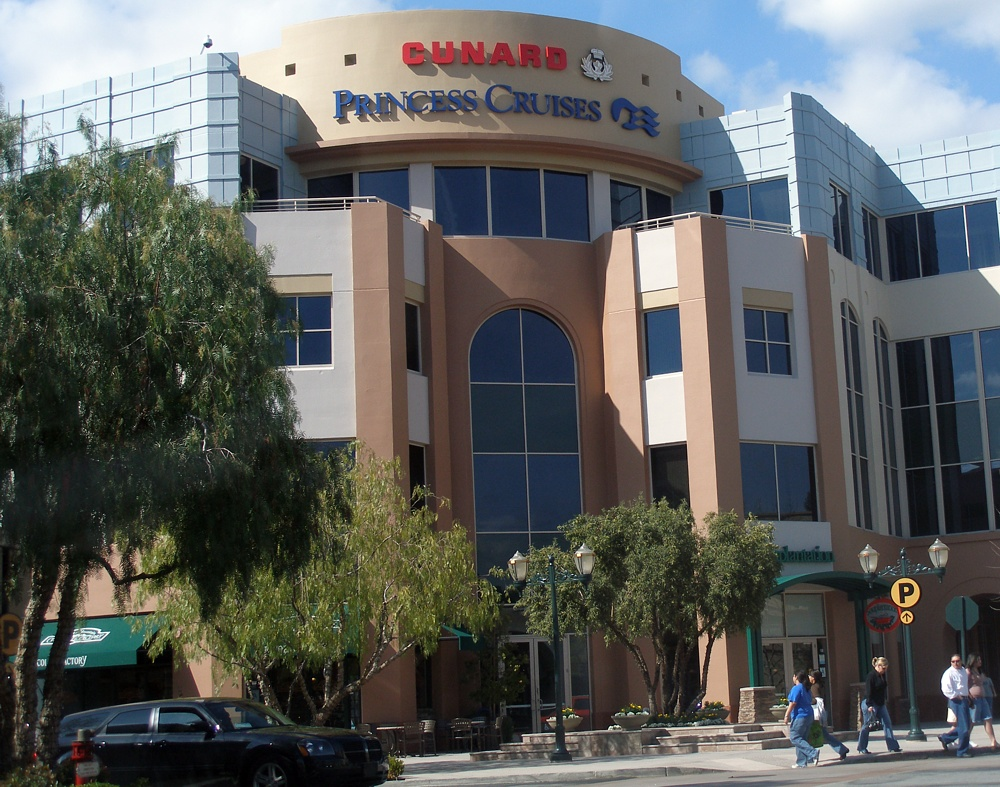
Princess Cruises headquarters in Valencia

According to the city's Comprehensive Annual Financial Report, for the fiscal year ending June 30, 2023, here are the top employers in the city.

#	Employer	# of Employees
1	Six Flags Magic Mountain	2,500
2	Henry Mayo Newhall Memorial Hospital	1,775
3	Princess Cruises	1,100
4	The Master's University	916
5	Boston Scientific	742
6	Logix	694
7	Advanced Bionics	693
8	Woodward HRT	647
9	Amazon	580
10	AMS Fulfillment	498

=== Industrial centers ===
Santa Clarita includes several industrial areas and office parks.

The Valencia Industrial Center is the largest business park in the Santa Clarita Valley, with 11,000,000 square feet (1,000,000 m^{2}) of office space. Stretching from Valencia High School to the I-5/CA-126 interchange, it includes the headquarters of the Saugus Union School District and The Santa Clarita Valley Signal, offices of Advanced Bionics, Aerospace Dynamics International, Woodward, ATK Audiotek, and other businesses.

Other industrial areas in the city include Saugus Station, on the east side of Railroad Avenue; Valencia Corporate Center, on Tourney Road just east of Interstate 5; Needham Ranch, on Sierra Highway south of Newhall Avenue; and Vista Canyon, on Lost Canyon Road west of Sand Canyon Road. The unincorporated area of Valencia west of Interstate 5 also contains several business parks, such as the Valencia Commerce Center.

=== Commercial centers ===
==== Valencia Town Center ====
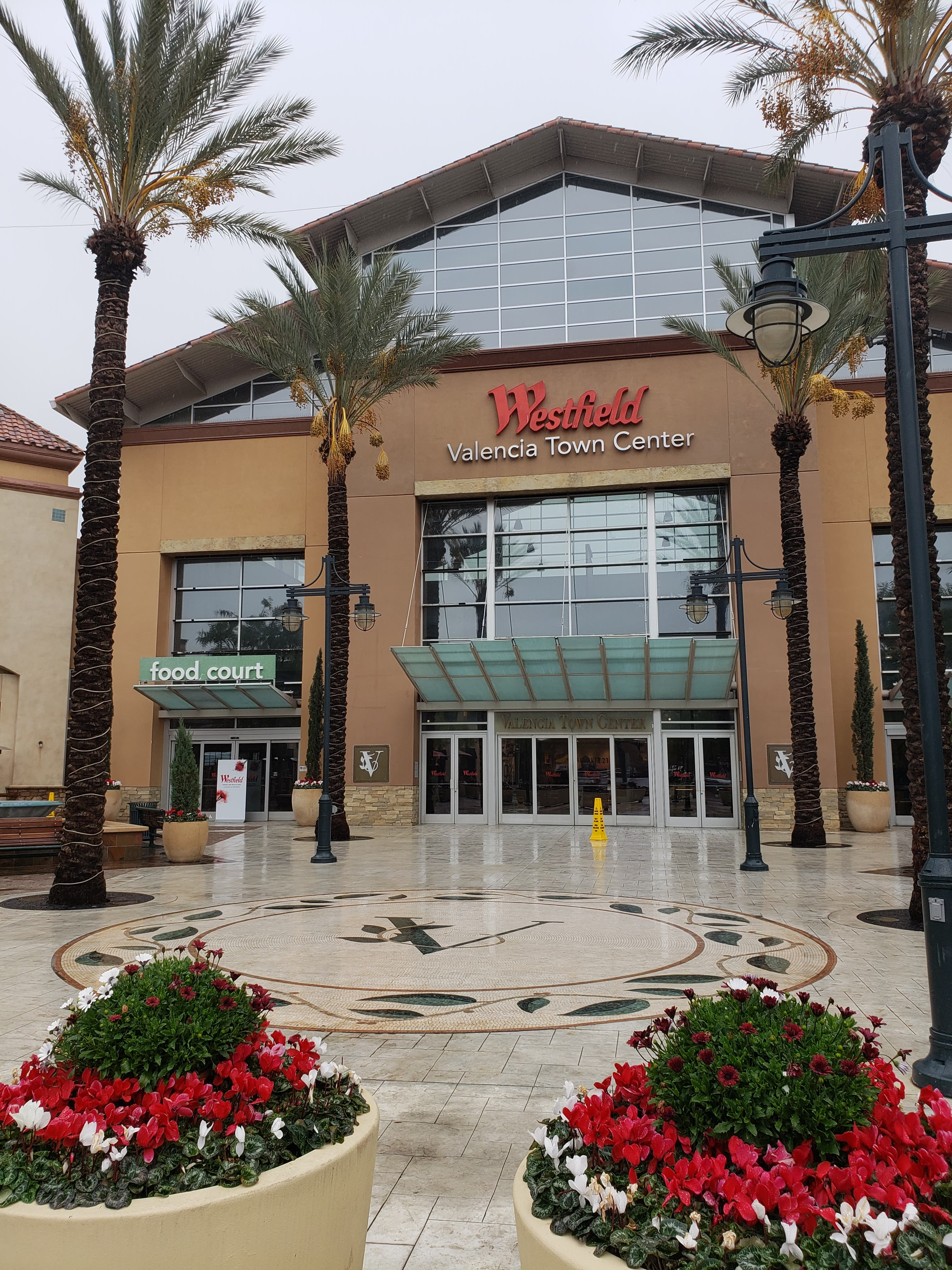
Valencia Town Center in Valencia

The largest shopping center in Santa Clarita is the Valencia Town Center. This large shopping mall occupies an area bounded by Valencia Boulevard to the south, McBean Parkway to the west, Magic Mountain Parkway to the north, and Citrus Street to the east. It includes over 1,000,000 square feet (93,000 m^{2}) of retail space and contains 134 stores and 46 restaurants. Town Center Drive circles the interior of the mall. Valencia Town Center and the surrounding area functions as one of the city's major business districts — within the area are the headquarters of Princess Cruises, the Santa Clarita City Hall, Santa Clarita Courthouse, and Santa Clarita Valley Medical Plaza. Six of the city's ten tallest buildings, including the three tallest, are in or adjacent to the Town Center; the two tallest buildings are 24305 Town Center Drive (headquarters of Princess Cruises) and the Hyatt Regency Valencia, both of which are 72 feet (22 m) tall. Most of the city's car dealerships are just north of the Town Center, near Magic Mountain Parkway, Creekside Road, and Auto Center Drive.

==== Old Town Newhall ====
The historic district of Old Town Newhall (aka. Downtown Newhall) is a major cultural and business center. It contains many independent restaurants, stores, and theaters, as well as a public library. The areas surrounding Old Town Newhall are predominantly Hispanic, and there are many Mexican restaurants there. Theaters in Old Town Newhall include Canyon Theater Guild, The Main, and Laemmle. The Old Town Newhall Farmers Market is located on the grounds of the public library. Other notable sites in the area include the William S. Hart Regional Park; Newhall DMV; Newhall Elementary School (part of the Newhall School District); Newhall Metrolink station; Newhall Terrace, Newhall Crossings, and Californian apartment complexes; Veterans Historical Plaza; First Presbyterian Church of Newhall; Unity Center mosque; Newhall Community Center; and the historic Saugus Train Station (Heritage Junction). The official Old Town Newhall website describes it as "Santa Clarita's premier arts and entertainment district." The Hart and Main wedding and event venue is scheduled to open in spring 2022. Some of the recent developments in Old Town Newhall have been described as gentrification.

Numerous other shopping centers are scattered throughout the city along major thoroughfares. These shopping centers include both chain stores and small businesses. The Centre Pointe Business Park is located near the city's geographic center, south of Soledad Canyon Road on both sides of Golden Valley Road. It includes the Centre Pointe Village and Centre Pointe Marketplace shopping centers.

== Media ==
The City of Santa Clarita and surrounding communities are served by several local media organizations.

=== Newspapers ===
Santa Clarita is served by the Los Angeles Daily News and The Santa Clarita Valley Signal. The Daily News primarily focuses on news, sports and entertainment stories in the city of Los Angeles and adjacent areas, but also covers Santa Clarita periodically. Daily News circulation numbers within the Santa Clarita Valley are not known.

==== The Santa Clarita Valley Signal ====
The primary daily newspaper, The Santa Clarita Valley Signal, was founded in 1919. In 2012, it had a weekday circulation of 10,454 and a Sunday circulation of 11,598. Until 2018, the newspaper focused almost exclusively on local news, sports, entertainment and features. In October 2016, the Signal moved its headquarters from Creekside Road in Valencia to Diamond Place near Centre Pointe Parkway; since October 2021, it has been headquartered on Avenue Stanford in the Valencia Industrial Center.

From 1979 to 2016, the Signal was owned by Morris Multimedia which is a company based in Savannah, Georgia. In 2016, Morris Multimedia sold the Signal to Paladin Multi-Media Group. In June 2018, Richard and Chris Budman purchased Paladin and began to publish a new free Sunday magazine, featuring a column by editor-in-chief Tim Whyte under the byline "Black and Whyte". According to an October 9, 2018, article in the Columbia Journalism Review (CJR), the new management led to a conservative shift in the paper's editorial stance, which prompted a group of progressives in the Santa Clarita Valley to start their own news outlet, the Proclaimer.

=== Radio ===
The primary radio station serving the Santa Clarita Valley is the Hometown Station, or KHTS. KHTS broadcasts on FM 98.1 and AM 1220. The KHTS transmitters are located along Sierra Highway in unincorporated northern Canyon Country, and its studios have been in Old Town Newhall since June 2015. KHTS was founded as KBET in 1984 and was renamed KIIS and later KHTS. KHTS is a full-service station—it covers local news, including talk shows, high school and college sports, as well as professional sports in the Los Angeles area.

The region is also served by FM-101.5 KZNQ-LP, Santa Clarita's first local FM radio station. It features a non-profit country music format owned and is operated by Santa Clarita Public Broadcasters Corporation, transmitting from Round Mountain in the city of Santa Clarita since 2015.

In addition to KHTS and KZNQ-LP, Santa Clarita and its surrounding communities are indirectly served by a number of major market Los Angeles FM and AM radio stations.

There are also several other Internet-based radio stations that serve the public in the Santa Clarita Valley.

=== Television ===
All local programming for Santa Clarita is carried on a single public-access television cable TV channel, which is operated by SCVTV, a tax-exempt 501(c)(3) nonprofit corporation. It is available to Spectrum Cable customers throughout the Santa Clarita Valley on Channel 20 and to AT&T U-verse customers under local programming (Channel 99/Santa Clarita). SCVTV carries public, educational and government programming, including Santa Clarita City Council and Planning Commission meetings, history shows, high school and college news programs, talk shows, football games, and other programs of local interest. SCVTV also runs the local news website scvnews.com and the history website scvhistory.com, the latter of which contains archives of the Santa Clarita Valley Historical Society.

There are no commercial over-the-air television stations in the Santa Clarita Valley. The city is part of the Los Angeles media market. Digital signals from the Los Angeles stations are available on local cable television systems, DirecTV, and Dish Network.

=== Podcasts ===
Local podcast studios serving the Santa Clarita Valley include Podcast SCV, Command Creative Studios and Arcay Studios.

=== Magazines ===
Magazines serving the Santa Clarita Valley include Seasons (which covers city-sponsored recreational programs), élite, Santa Clarita Magazine, and Inside SCV.

== Transportation ==
=== Highways ===
- The only interstate highway in the city is Interstate 5, which defines the city's western border. Interstate 5 is one of the main arteries of the western United States, and connects Santa Clarita with the rest of greater Los Angeles to the south and the Central Valley to the north.
- California State Route 14 passes through the east side of the city and connects Santa Clarita to the Antelope Valley cities of Palmdale and Lancaster. Route 14 merges with Interstate 5 at the large Newhall Pass interchange just south of the city. This interchange is the primary route used by Santa Claritans commuting to Los Angeles. Due to the rugged terrain of the Santa Susana and San Gabriel Mountains, it is one of the few routes (and the only freeway) connecting northern Los Angeles County with the rest of the county.
- California State Route 126 follows the Santa Clara River from I-5 in Santa Clarita to Ventura, passing through Piru, Fillmore, and Santa Paula. The Santa Clarita Veterans' Parkway, formerly the Cross Valley Connector, connects Route 126 in Valencia to Route 14 on the city's eastern edge. It includes the entirety of Newhall Ranch Road, and Golden Valley Road from Newhall Ranch Road to State Route 14.
- Sierra Highway passes through the east side of the city, parallel to and west of Route 14, providing an alternate route to the Sierra Pelona Mountains and Antelope Valley, as well as to the Los Angeles Basin. Although named a highway, it is actually a surface street in the Santa Clarita area.

=== Bus service ===
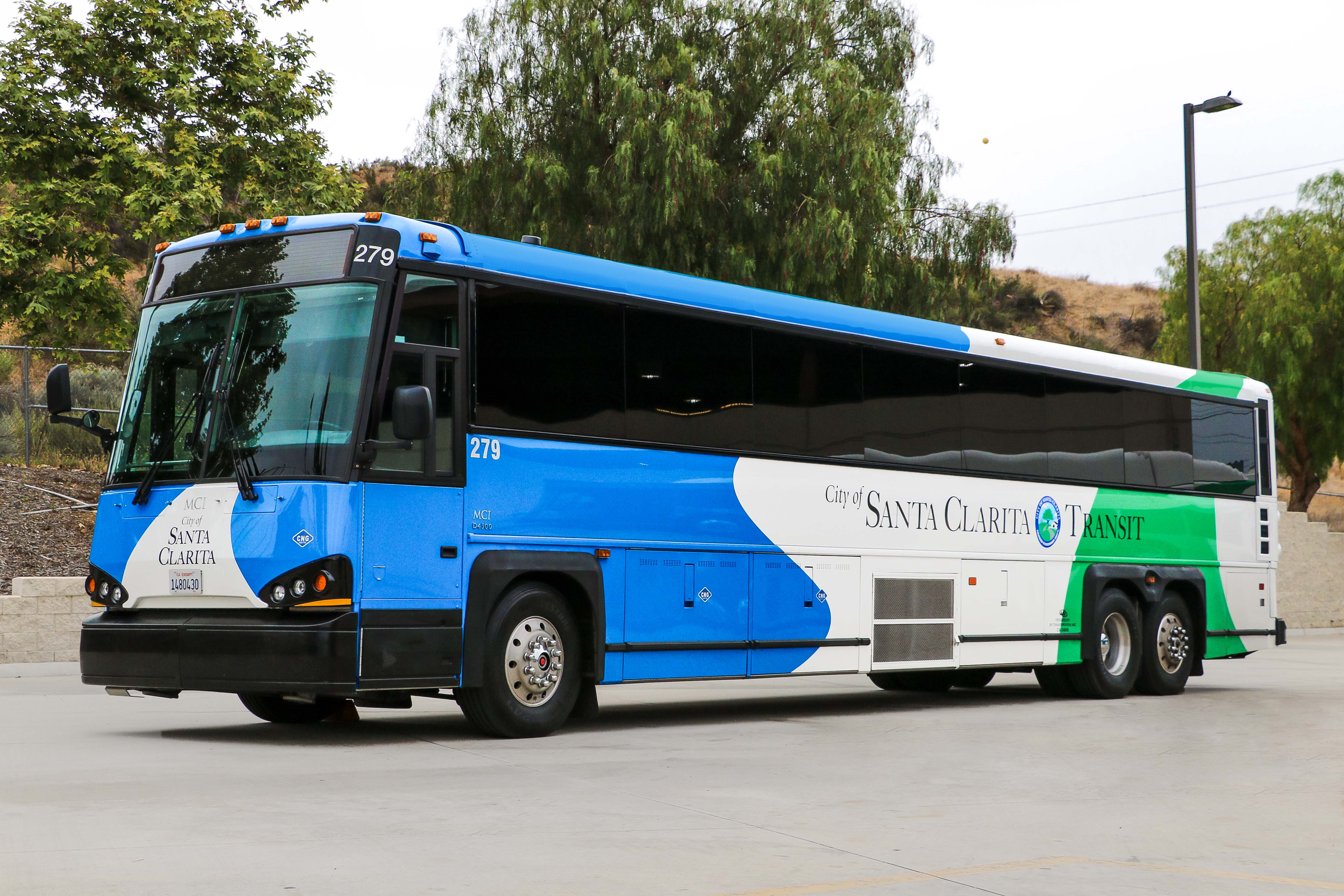
City of Santa Clarita Transit provides "Commuter Express Service" between Santa Clarita and various destinations throughout Greater Los Angeles.

City of Santa Clarita Transit, formerly known simply as Santa Clarita Transit, provides extensive bus service within the Santa Clarita Valley and to/from North Hollywood in the San Fernando Valley. City of Santa Clarita Transit is operated by MV Transportation, under contract with the city of Santa Clarita.

On weekdays, City of Santa Clarita Transit operates commuter buses to/from Union Station in downtown Los Angeles and North Hollywood Station (operating seven days per week as the "NoHo Express/757"), allowing riders to access Metro Los Angeles rapid transit subway and light rail services, as well as Warner Center, Burbank, Van Nuys, Century City, and UCLA. During the summer, the city provides a limited express service to the Santa Monica Pier.

On weekdays when school is in session, City of Santa Clarita Transit operates supplemental school-day service with routes and scheduled stops designed around various schools within the Santa Clarita Valley.

City of Santa Clarita Transit also operates Dial-A-Ride service for seniors and the disabled. The service allows for pick-up and drop-off at any address within the City of Santa Clarita and within a three-quarter mile radius of the nearest fixed route bus stop in unincorporated areas.

City of Santa Clarita Transit operates weekdays from 4:55 a.m.–10:30 p.m., Saturdays from 6:30 a.m.-9:45 p.m., and on Sundays from 7:15 a.m. to 9:00 p.m. Service operates as frequently as every 10 minutes during peak periods to every 85 minutes during off-peak hours. Typically buses operate every 25 to 60 minutes.

=== Rail ===
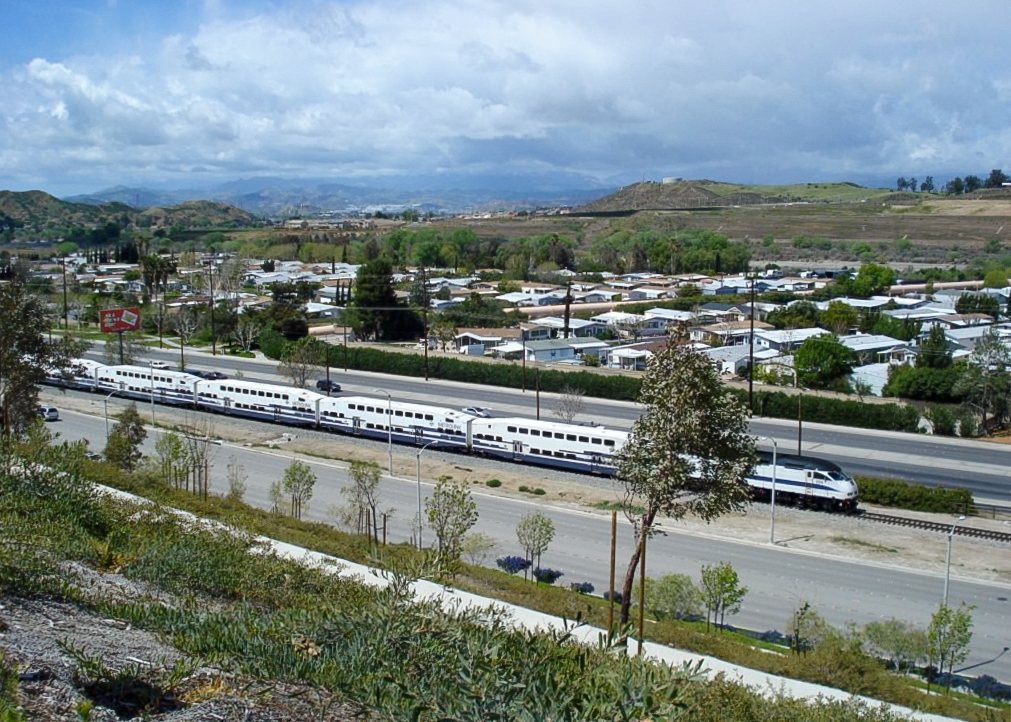
A Metrolink Antelope Valley Line train passing through Santa Clarita

Metrolink provides commuter rail service to the Santa Clarita Valley along its Antelope Valley Line, which runs between Lancaster station in Lancaster and Union Station in Downtown Los Angeles, where transfers can be made to further destinations in Southern California and beyond. There are three Metrolink stations in the city: Via Princessa station in Canyon Country, Santa Clarita station in Saugus (near the geographic center of the city), and Newhall station in Newhall. All stations have large parking lots to allow commuters to park and ride. An additional infill station, Vista Canyon Multi-Modal Center, opened on October 23, 2023 in Canyon Country, east of Via Princessa station. Metrolink service operates 7 days a week, with reduced service on Saturdays and Sundays.

=== Bicycle and walking ===
There are a series of bike trails and walking paths threaded throughout the city. Bicyclists can ride from the eastern end of the city in Canyon Country along a paved path which is independent from automobile traffic all the way to Valencia on the Santa Clara River Trail. This path closely follows the Santa Clara River and Soledad Canyon Road. There are many jumping-off points along this route providing access to neighborhoods, Metrolink stations and commerce. In Valencia, there are several pedestrian bridges called paseos connected to the bike path network. The paseos keep riders and walkers above and away from automobile traffic. The neighborhoods in Valencia were planned to include an ample amount of walking and riding paths that connect to this overall network. Santa Clarita contains over 77 miles (124 km) of bicycle routes. In 2007, the League of American Bicyclists awarded Santa Clarita its bronze designation as a bicycle friendly community.

=== Air travel ===
There are no airports in the city of Santa Clarita. The nearest airports are the small Agua Dulce Airpark in Agua Dulce and Whiteman Airport in Pacoima. Commercial airlines fly into Bob Hope Airport in Burbank which is about 23 miles (37 km) and Los Angeles International Airport in Los Angeles, approximately 42 miles (68 km) from Santa Clarita.

== Culture ==
=== Films ===
Santa Clarita, along with other foothill regions in Greater Los Angeles is known for its movie ranches. The valley contains multiple movie ranches including Melody Ranch, Sable Ranch, Rancho Deluxe, Golden Oak Ranch, Blue Cloud Movie Ranch, and Veluzat Movie Ranch. These movie ranches lie within the studio zone, the area within a 30-mile (48 km) radius of the intersection of Beverly and La Cienega Boulevards in West Los Angeles. Movie ranches are a major contributor to Santa Clarita's economy, and the valley has been nicknamed "Hollywood North." Movies and TV shows filmed in Santa Clarita include Django Unchained, NCIS, Franklin & Bash, Jane by Design, Make It or Break It, Mighty Morphin Power Rangers, The Muppets, Pirates of the Caribbean, 24, and Old Yeller.

Other filming locations in the Santa Clarita Valley include CalArts, Castaic Lake, College of the Canyons, Westfield Valencia Town Center, Placerita Canyon State Park, Southern California Innovation Park (an office park in Valencia), Saugus Cafe, and Halfway House Cafe which is on the outskirts of Canyon Country. Vasquez Rocks, located in Agua Dulce about 10 miles (16 km) northeast of the city, has also been used as a filming location for many movies and shows.

Santa Clarita was the setting of the horror-comedy show Santa Clarita Diet, which debuted on February 3, 2017 and was canceled on April 26, 2019. The show revolves around the careers of real estate agents Joel and Sheila Hammond. Sheila Hammond becomes undead and starts craving human flesh. As Joel and the family try helping Sheila during her metamorphosis, they deal with neighbors and cultural norms.

==== Western films ====
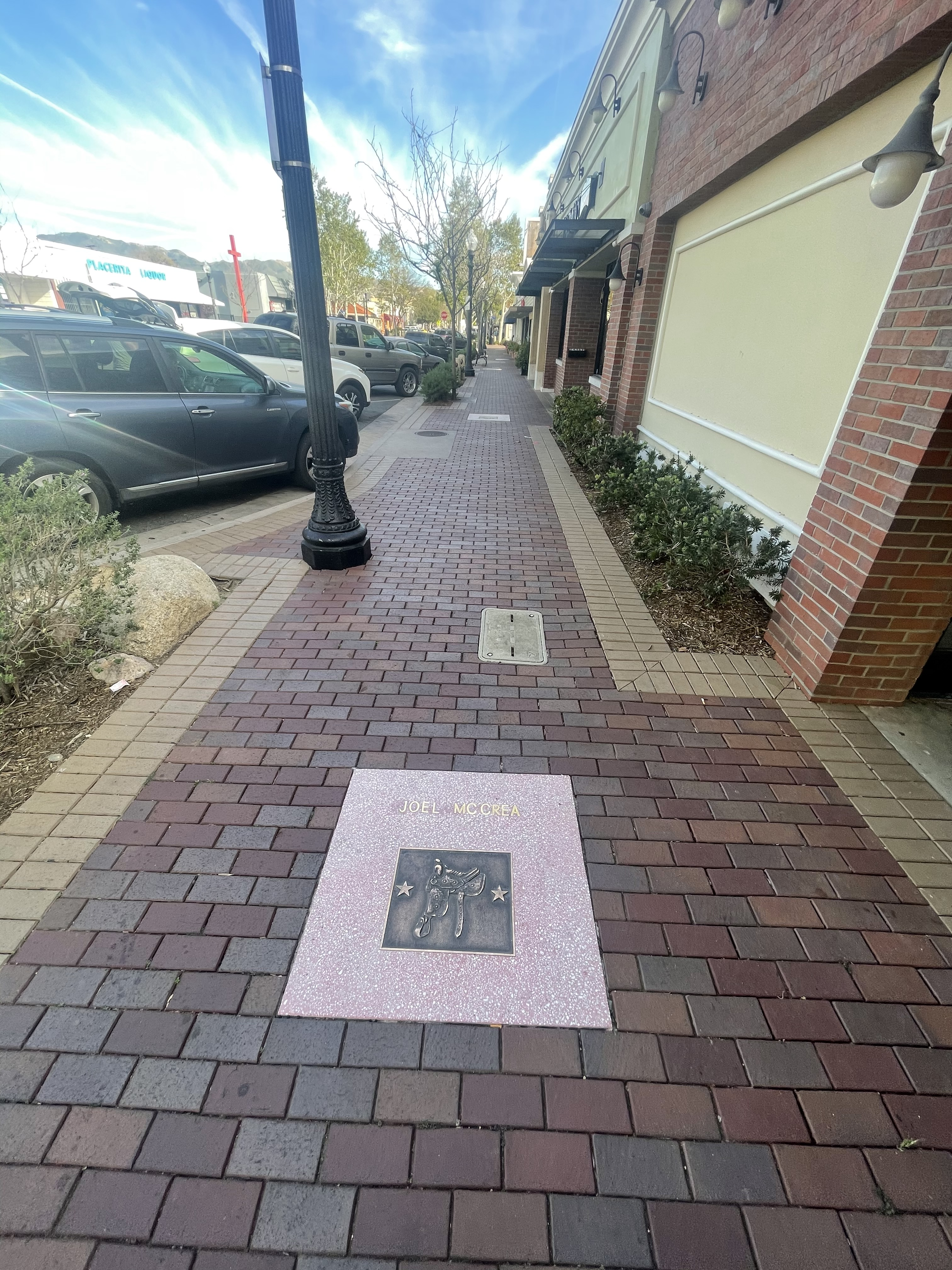
Walk of Western Stars in Newhall

Santa Clarita has been the home of many well-known stars of Western film, including William S. Hart, Harry Carey, John Ford, and Gene Autry. Western film, television, and radio figures are honored at the Walk of Western Stars, located along Main Street in Old Town Newhall. Each April, the city of Santa Clarita inducts one or two new honorees into the Walk of Western Stars. The walk was founded in 1981; previous honorees have included Roy Rogers, Dale Evans, John Wayne, Sam Elliott, Richard Farnsworth, and Bruce Dern. The induction ceremony is held in conjunction with the Santa Clarita Cowboy Festival at William S. Hart Park.

==== Packard Humanities Institute ====
The Packard Humanities Institute, headquartered in Los Altos, also has a campus in Santa Clarita. The campus, which opened in 2014, is located in Valencia directly south of College of the Canyons. It includes a film preservation facility which houses more than 400,000 films from Paramount Pictures, Warner Brothers, Columbia Pictures, 20th Century Fox, and Republic Pictures.

== Sister cities ==
The city is a member of Sister Cities International.

- Tena, Napo, Ecuador
- Sariaya, Quezon, Philippines
