= Saugus, Santa Clarita, California =

Saugus
- Neighborhood of Santa Clarita
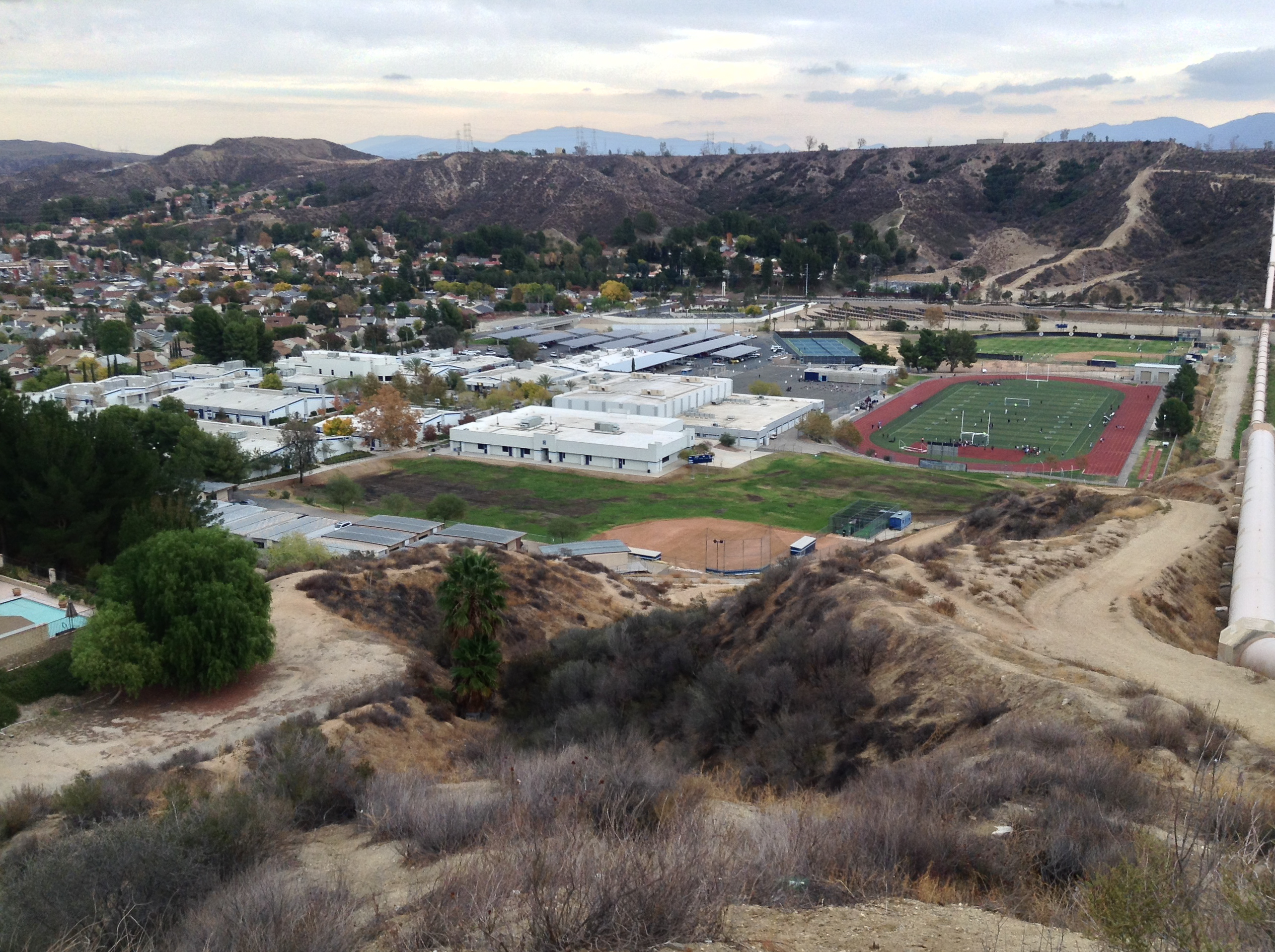
- Saugus High School

- Position in Los Angeles County Saugus (the Los Angeles metropolitan area) Saugus (California)
- Coordinates: 34.44°N 118.52°W
- Country: United States of America
- State: California
- County: Los Angeles
- City: Santa Clarita
- Elevation: 1,266 ft (386 m)
- Time zone: UTC-8 (Pacific (PST))
  - Summer (DST): UTC-7 (PDT)
- ZIP Code: 91350, 91390
- Area code: 661
- GNIS feature ID: 1661408
- Website: santaclarita.gov

Baker Ranch Rodeo, Saugus, c. 1926

Saugus is a neighborhood in Santa Clarita, California. It was one of four communities (with Valencia, Newhall and Canyon Country) that merged in 1987 to create the city of Santa Clarita. Saugus includes the central and north-central portions of the city. It is named after Saugus, Massachusetts, the hometown of Henry Newhall, upon whose land the town was originally built.

== History ==
Saugus was first named Newhall by Henry Mayo Newhall, who bought the eastern half of the Del Valle family's Rancho San Francisco from a series of speculators. After he moved the town south in 1879, he renamed the original site for his birthplace, Saugus, Massachusetts.

The Saugus Cafe was established in 1886 on San Fernando Road (now Railroad Avenue). It was the oldest continuously operating restaurant in Los Angeles County.

The Saugus Speedway first opened in 1939, initially known as Bonelli Stadium. It was the venue for several NASCAR races before its closure in 1995. The Saugus Speedway continued to be the venue for the Santa Clarita Swap Meet until October 2024.

In 1987, the city of Santa Clarita was incorporated, encompassing Saugus and the neighboring communities of Canyon Country, Newhall, and part of Valencia.

On November 14, 2019, a mass shooting took place at Saugus High School. That morning, Nathaniel Berhow, a 16-year-old junior at the school, used a semi-automatic pistol to shoot five other students, killing two of them, before turning his gun on himself. The shooting lasted 16 seconds. Survivors were reunited with their parents at nearby Central Park, and injured students were sent to Henry Mayo Hospital in Valencia and Providence Holy Cross Medical Center in Mission Hills. The shooter succumbed to his self-inflicted injuries the following day in the hospital. A vigil honoring the victims was held at Central Park the next day.

== Education ==
Elementary school students in Saugus attend schools in the Saugus Union School District. Junior high and high school students attend schools in the William S. Hart Union High School District. Most junior high and high school students in Saugus attend Arroyo Seco Junior High School and Saugus High School; some attend nearby Golden Valley, Hart, and Valencia High Schools and the corresponding junior high schools.

== Transportation ==
Saugus is located on the path of the Metrolink Antelope Valley Line. The line's Santa Clarita station is located in Saugus on the south side of Soledad Canyon Road. Bouquet Canyon Road is a major thoroughfare through Saugus, running northeast-southwest from the Angeles National Forest north of the city to Magic Mountain Parkway on the border with Valencia. Other major thoroughfares in Saugus include Seco Canyon Road, Haskell Canyon Road, Plum Canyon Road, Soledad Canyon Road, Newhall Ranch Road, Copper Hill Drive, and Golden Valley Road. All aforementioned streets except for Copper Hill Drive and Golden Valley Road intersect Bouquet Canyon Road; Copper Hill Drive is connected to Bouquet Canyon Road by David Way, a short residential street.

== Demographics ==
As of 2019, the population of the 91350 zip code (which encompasses most of Saugus) was 36,173. The median household income in 91350 was $117,707. The part of Saugus north of Copper Hill Drive is in zip code 91390, shared with parts of unincorporated Canyon Country and all of Agua Dulce and Green Valley.

== Notable people ==
- Luca Bombino, soccer player
- Red Callender, jazz musician
- Harry Carey, actor
- Harry Carey Jr., actor
- Frank Coghlan Jr., actor and naval aviator
- Mandy Gonzalez, actress and singer
- Ross Lonsberry, professional hockey player
- Nick Nickson, Los Angeles Kings announcer
- Ruby Rose Turner, actress
- Abbey Weitzeil, Olympic swimmer

== See also ==
- Central Park - the largest city park in Santa Clarita, located in Saugus
- San Gabriel Fault
- Santa Clarita Valley
- Saugus Speedway
- Saugus station
