= Canyon High School (Santa Clarita, California) =

Coordinates: 34.4287°N 118.4724°W

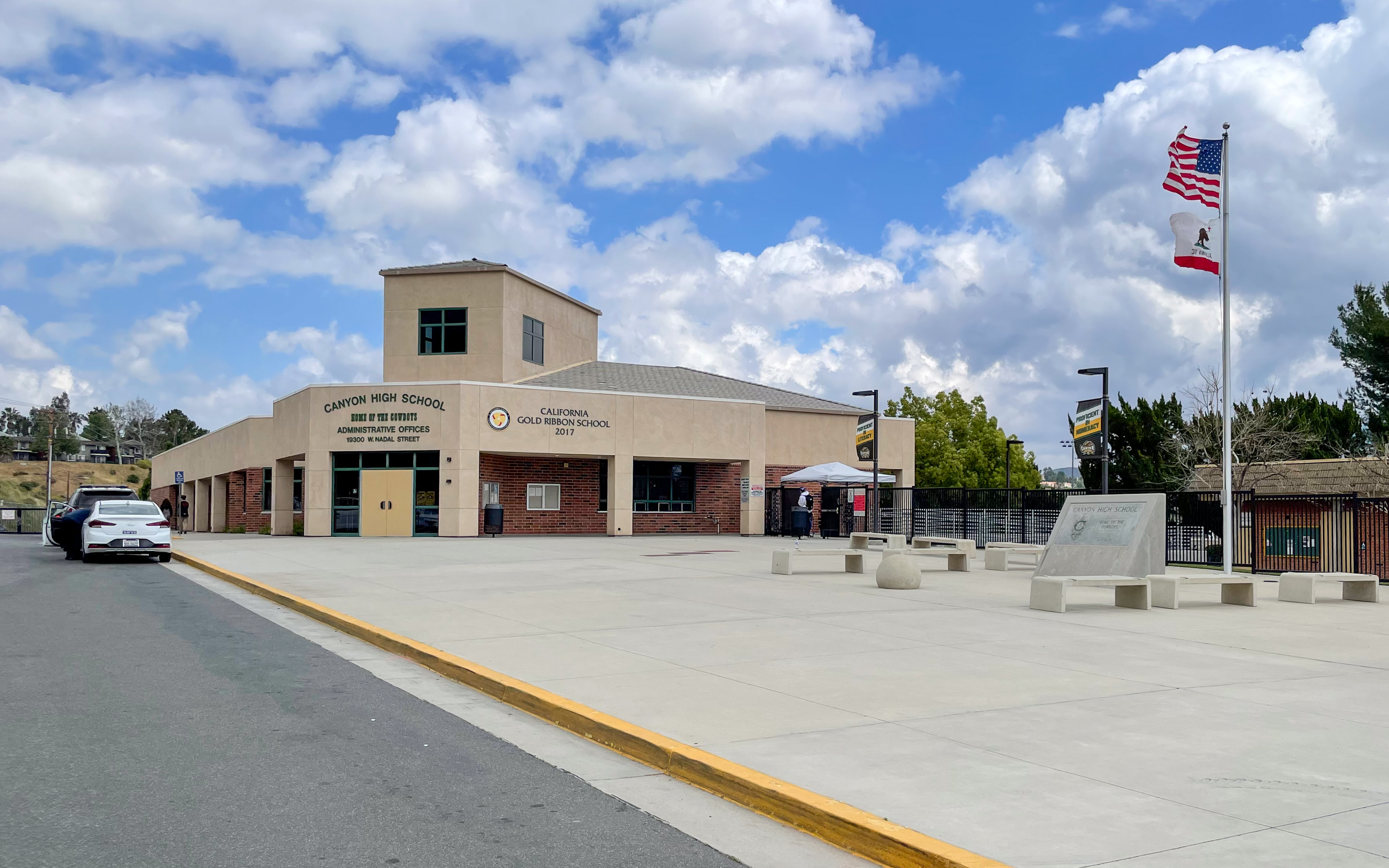
- Canyon High School, May 2023

Location
- 19300 Nadal Street; Canyon Country, California 91351; United States

Information
- Type: Public
- Established: 1968
- Principal: Shellie Holcombe
- Teaching staff: 82.24 (FTE)
- Grades: 9 - 12
- Enrollment: 1,966 (2023-2024)
- Student to teacher ratio: 23.91
- Color
- Athletics conference: CIF Southern Section; Foothill League
- Mascot: Cowboy
- Yearbook: Trails
- Website: www.canyonhighcowboys.org

Canyon High School (CHS or CNHS to avoid confusion with Castaic High School) is a high school in the William S. Hart Union High School District in Canyon Country, Santa Clarita, California.

== History ==
The school opened in September 1968 in three phases at a cost of $3.6 million. It started with five buildings and a library, with administrative offices in portable buildings. C.T. Haan was both the first principal and superintendent of the Hart School District.

== Academics ==
The sign in front of Canyon High School

Canyon High School has an academic program with emphasis on preparation for higher education. All preparatory courses required by the University of California and other institutions of higher learning are offered.

Honors and AP courses are offered in science, mathematics, social studies, foreign languages, and fine arts. The AVID (Advancement Via Individual Determination) program encourages students from non-academic backgrounds to undertake the college preparatory curriculum and provides them with resources to increase their chance of success in strong academic programs.

Canyon High School supports a Career Paths program which prepares students for careers in theater arts, health science, video production, engineering, and industrial technology. Students engaged in the Career path programs attend tailored classes and are afford internship opportunities in their chosen fields. The Career Paths programs ties into the William S. Hart district's Regional Occupational Program (ROP) which offers real-world experiences for students in 30 career fields ranging from forensics to floristry.

In 2026, Canyon High School was recognized as a California Distinguished School by the California Department of Education.

== Athletics ==
Canyon High School is governed by the California Interscholastic Federation (CIF) Southern Section as a member of the Foothill League. Its athletic mascot is the Cowboy and its colors are hunter green and gold. Canyon's main rival is William S. Hart High School in Newhall, dating back to 1968. Canyon High School competes in the Foothill League, which also includes Castaic, Golden Valley, Hart, Saugus, West Ranch, and Valencia High Schools.

State Championship
Sport			Year
Football	Division I	Canyon (Santa Clarita) def. De La Salle (Concord) 27-13	2006
Boys Cross Country			2001
Girls Cross Country			1995

Canyon High School has 23 Sport Teams as of the 2026-2027 school year.

- Baseball
- Softball
- Boys Basketball
- Girls Basketball
- Boys Cross Country
- Girls Cross Country
- Flag Football
- Football
- Boys Golf
- Girls Golf
- Boys Soccer
- Girls Soccer
- Girls Swim & Dive
- Boys Swim & Dive
- Boys Tennis
- Girls Tennis
- Boys Track & Field
- Girls Track & Field
- Boys Volleyball
- Girls Volleyball
- Traditional Cheer
- Competitive Dance
  - Canyon High's Dance Team went to WCE Nationals in Long Beach, California in March 2026. Ean Williams placed 6th in Grade 12 Solo's (Gold), and Canyon High placed 5th in Silver Varsity Duet/Trio.
- Marching Band (The Gold Star Brigade)
  - At the Simi Valley Field Tournament in October 2026, Canyon High School's Gold Star Brigade ranked 2nd in the total of the 4A division. They ranked 2nd in music performance, 1st in GE(Music/Visual), 3rd in visual performance, 4th in auxiliary, and 3rd in percussion.

== Student demographics ==
As of the 2021-22 school year, 1,959 students were enrolled at Canyon High School. Of those, 62.3% were Hispanic, 22.9% were non-Hispanic white, 6.1% were Asian American, and 4.1% were African American. As of 2020-21, 956 students (48.1%) were eligible for free or reduced-price lunch.

As of the 2025-26 school year, 1,846 students were enrolled at Canyon High School. Of those, 65% were Hispanic, 25% were White, 3.7% were African American, 3.5% were Filipino and 1.0% were Asian.

Of the 1,846 student enrolled at Canyon High School for the 2025-26 school year; 24.8% were in Grade 9, 26.2% were in Grade 10, 23.1% were in Grade 11, and 25.9% were in Grade 12.

== Notable alumni ==
- Vanessa Atler - former elite gymnast
- Printz Board - Grammy-winning musician, most notably with The Black Eyed Peas
- Zach Britton - Major League Baseball pitcher for the New York Yankees
- Crystl Bustos - twice Olympic gold medalist on the USA softball team and three times gold medalist at the Pan-American Games.
- Fred Cornwell - National Football League tight end (Dallas Cowboys, 1984–85)
- Lauren Fleshman - professional track and field athlete and U.S. 5000m champion.
- Jonathan Hatami - American lawyer, best known for his appearance in the Netflix documentary The Trials of Gabriel Fernandez.
- Erik Hiljus - Major League Baseball pitcher
- Nate Longshore - college football quarterback, for the California Golden Bears.
- Jesse McClure- television personality Storage Hunters, Storage Hunters UK, and British Treasure, American Gold
- Kevan Miller - National Hockey League defenseman for the Boston Bruins
- Alysia Montaño - US Olympic middle-distance runner
- Chuck Osborne - DT NFL 1996-2001. Played at University of Arizona, 1992-96.
- Kelly Packard - American actress and television personality
- Mohammed Roknipour - professional soccer player for the Los Angeles Blues
- Chris Seddon - Major League Baseball pitcher
- Keith Smith - former Major League Baseball Shortstop
- Cory Snyder - former Major League Baseball utility player
- Justin K. Thompson - Animation director
- Daryn Tufts - director, writer, and actor. Wrote and directed My Girlfriend's Boyfriend (2010 film) and Inside (2012 American film).
- Jane Wells - television personality
- Drew Wolitarsky - Canadian Football League wide receiver for the Winnipeg Blue Bombers
