= Valencia High School (Santa Clarita, California) =

Public high school in California, United States

Coordinates: 34.4426°N 118.5636°W

Location
- 27801 Dickason Drive; Valencia, California 91355; United States

Information
- Type: Public
- Motto: Learning For Life
- Established: 1994
- Principal: Kullen *Welch
- Teaching staff: 102.54 (FTE)
- Grades: 9–12
- Enrollment: 2,258 (2023-2024)
- Student to teacher ratio: 22.02
- Colors: Purple and gold
- Athletics: Wrestling; Basketball; Football; Cross country Golf; Soccer; Softball; Swimming; Track and field Tennis; Volleyball; Dance; Lacrosse; Cheerleading; Baseball
- Athletics conference: CIF Southern Section; Foothill League
- Mascot: Vick the Viking
- Nickname: Vikings
- Newspaper: The Viking Vision
- Yearbook: The Viking Voyager
- Website: Valencia High School

Valencia High School is a public secondary school located in the neighborhood of Valencia in the city of Santa Clarita, California, United States. It is a part of the William S. Hart Union High School District.

Valencia High School is ranked in Newsweek's 2012 list of America's Best High Schools. The list is based on six components provided by school administrators: graduation rate (25 percent), college matriculation rate (25 percent), AP/IB/AICE tests taken per student (25 percent), average SAT/ACT scores (10 percent), average AP/IB/AICE scores (10 percent), and AP courses offered per student (5 percent).

== History ==
Valencia High School opened on September 1, 1994. The school received its first full accreditation from WASC in 1998. In 2001, Dr. Paul A. Priesz was named California Principal of the Year. This was the year that Valencia High School's student population reached over 3,500 students.

== Controversies ==
In 2008 four Valencia high school students reached a settlement for $300,000 over racial discrimination. In 2020 during quarantine Principal Stephen Ford resigned after a petition received 600 signatures in response to Ford comparing wearing masks to the Holocaust. On March 15, 2023, a student was caught on video driving around the school parking lot and singing "I don't like n-". This video sparked outrage from the NAACP and representatives from the William S. Hart School District.

== Principals ==
In chronological order:

- Dr. Paul A. Priesz
- John Costanzo
- Stephen Ford
- Mr. Welch (2025)

== Activities ==
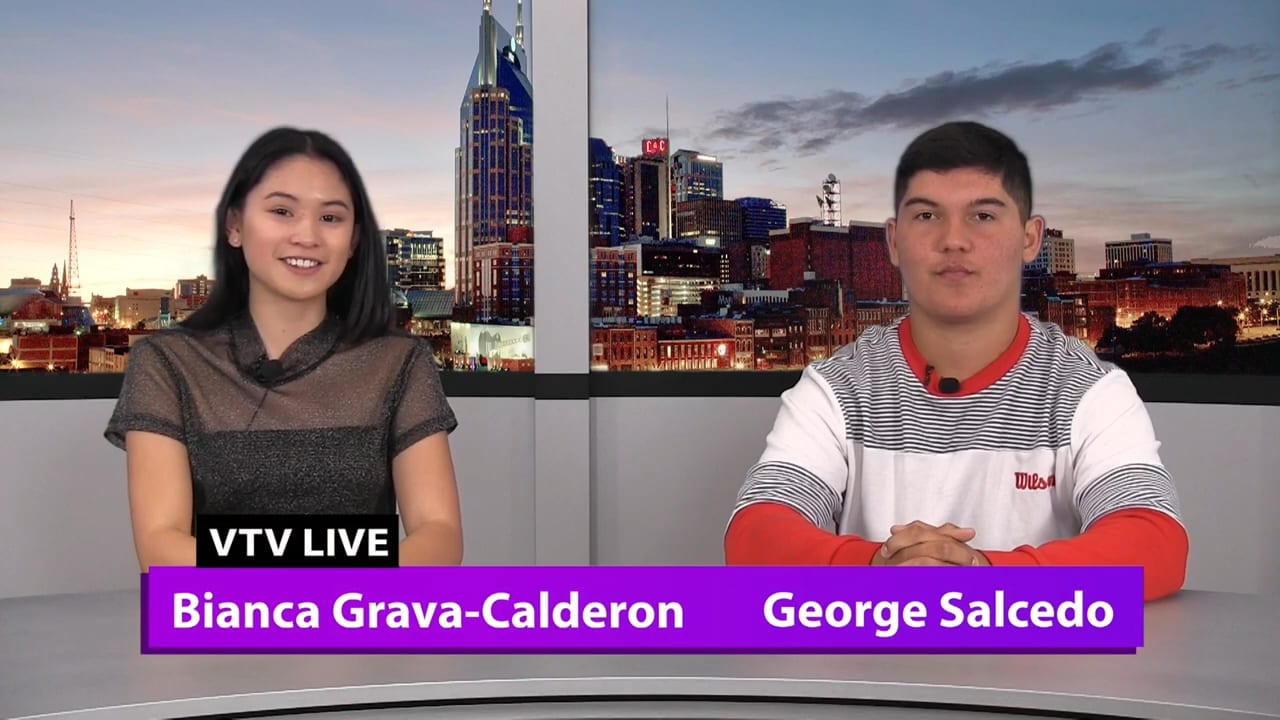
VTV anchors Bianca Grava-Calderon and George Salcedo

=== VTV ===
VTV is an early morning news broadcast to the school. Valencia High School's video program has entered their productions into competitions such as STN, NFFTY, All American High School Film Festival (AAHSFF), and the Santa Clarita Valley Film Festival.

=== Choir ===
The Concert Choir has repeatedly achieved the ratings of "Gold Choir" and "Choir of the Festival".

=== Band ===
The band performs at home football games, school rallies, community events, and several competitive regional marching band competitions. The band has won gold medals in the Southern California School Band and Orchestra Association (SCSBOA) three times. The band has performed at Bands of America events as well as Hawaii, Carnegie Hall, and Florida.

=== Color Guard ===
The color guard performs at home football games and at school rallies. It also has competitive seasons for both the first and second semester of the school year. Within the first semester, the team performs with the Valencia High School marching band. During the second semester, the team takes part in WGASC and WGI competitions. In 2022 Valencia won gold at the SCSBOA Championships in the 2A Division.

=== AFJROTC ===
AFJROTC’s goal is to train high school cadets in citizenship. The other goals are to instill responsibility, character, and self-discipline.

== Athletics ==
Valencia High School Softball - National Champions 2007

=== Foothill League Champions ===
Valencia High School competes in the Foothill League athletic conference. The other schools in the league are Canyon, Castaic, Golden Valley, Hart, Saugus, and West Ranch High Schools. The schools that no longer participate are John Burroughs High School and Burbank High School.

=== State Champions ===
- Softball - 2007
- Boys' Volleyball - 2008
- Track & Field - 2009
- Boys' Basketball - 2023

=== National Champions ===
- Dance Team - 2003
- Boys Volleyball - 2006
- Softball - 2007
- Dance Team - 2007
- Dance Team - 2008
- Boys Volleyball - 2008
- Dance Team - 2009
- Dance Team - 2010
- Dance Team - 2011

== Student demographics ==
As of the 2021–22 academic year, Valencia was the most populous school in the Hart District, with 2,484 students. 44.2% of students were non-Hispanic white, 23.6% were Hispanic, 20.8% were Asian American, and 3.9% were African American. As of 2020–21, 395 students (15.0%) were eligible for free or reduced-price lunch.

== Notable alumni ==
- Lulu Antariksa, actor and singer (Class of 2011)
- Taylor Dooley, actor (Class of 2011)
- Kyle Ensing, professional volleyball player and member of the 2020 Olympic roster (Class of 2015)
- Keston Hiura, MLB player for the Milwaukee Brewers (Class of 2014)
- Max Homa, professional PGA golfer (Class of 2009)
- Taylor Lautner, actor (Class of 2010)
- Tanner Miller, college football player (Class of 2019)
- Jared Oliva, MLB player for the Pittsburgh Pirates (Class of 2013)
- Naya Rivera, actress (Class of 2005)
- Mackenzie Rosman, actress (Class of 2007)
- Tedric Thompson, former NFL safety for the Seattle Seahawks (Class of 2013)
- Ashley Tisdale, actress (Class of 2003)
- Shane Vereen, former NFL player for the New York Giants (Class of 2007)
- Manuel White, former NFL player for the Washington Redskins (Class of 2000)
- Danny Worth, former MLB player for the Detroit Tigers (Class of 2004)

== Filming location ==
Valencia High School was used as a set for the films Bio-Dome, Romy and Michelle's High School Reunion, and Pleasantville. It was also used for filming the TV series Sweet Valley High and Masked Rider. In 2019, George Salcedo's two short films Witness to Murder and Winger were also filmed on campus.
