= Southern California School Band and Orchestra Association =

Musical organization in Southern California

- Formation: October 9, 1937; 89 years ago
- Type: Performing arts organization
- Tax ID no.: 95-2500091
- Legal status: 501(c)(3) organization
- Region served: Southern California
- Members: 1,000 schools (2026)
- President: Cathy Olinger
- Revenue: ▼US$1.4 million (2026)
- Expenses: ▲US$1.3 million (2026)
- Website: scsboa.org

The Southern California School Band and Orchestra Association (SCSBOA) is a performing arts association and governing body which serves scholastic instrumental music programs in Southern California. Founded in 1937, the association's activities include honor ensembles and band festivals, as well as marching band competitions.

== Concert band ==
=== Honor ensembles ===
The association organizes honor ensembles for elementary, middle, and high school students selected through auditions. These include concert bands, string orchestras, full orchestras, and jazz bands. The ensembles have commissioned numerous musical works, including Double Helix, published by CPP Belwin.

=== Festivals ===
The association's festivals evaluate instrumental ensembles through performances of three prepared pieces and a sight-reading selection, typically one difficulty level below the prepared repertoire.

== Marching band ==
The association sanctions parade and field show competitions throughout Southern California. Adjudicators are selected for their experience directing competitive ensembles and are generally peers of the participating band directors.

=== Parade ===
Parade competitions are typically hosted by municipalities, community organizations, or school bands. Specialized events known as band reviews feature primarily competing bands, sometimes preceded by dignitaries in automobiles.

Participants are adjudicated in four categories: Band, Drill Team, Auxiliary, and Drum Major. Bands may be classified by school enrollment, ensemble size, or rankings from the previous season, at the discretion of the event chair.

=== Field show ===
Field show competitions are typically hosted by high school bands, which generally do not compete in their own events.

The season culminates in the SCSBOA Field Show Championships, held annually in mid-November. The twelve highest-ranked bands in each division qualify based on the sum of their three highest scores during the season.

== Past field show champions ==
Below is an incomplete list of class champions at the annual SCSBOA Field Show Championships:

Year	1A	2A	3A	4A	5A	6A
2002	Arlington	Capistrano Valley	William S. Hart	Valencia	John W. North	Etiwanda
2003	West Hills	Santa Margarita Catholic	William S. Hart	Valencia	John W. North	Etiwanda
2004	Bellflower	La Puente	Santa Margarita	William S. Hart	Fountain Valley	El Dorado
2005	Los Angeles	La Puente	San Marcos	William S. Hart	Carlsbad	Chino
2006	Capistrano Valley	Los Alamitos	Chino Hills	William S. Hart	Fountain Valley	Chino
2007	Charter Oak	San Marcos	West Ranch	William S. Hart	Los Osos	Chino
2008	San Marcos	Eastlake	West Ranch	William S. Hart	Murrieta Valley	Chino
2009	Los Angeles	Azusa	Carlsbad	William S. Hart	Savanna	Chino
2010	San Marcos	Patriot	Carlsbad	William S. Hart	Nogales	Chino
2011	Charter Oak	Colony	Azusa	South Hills	Vista	Chino
2012	Los Angeles	San Marcos	Azusa	West Ranch	Los Osos	Etiwanda
2013	San Marcos	Patriot	Valencia	William S. Hart	Fountain Valley	Rancho Bernardo
2014	Saddleback	Moorpark	Palisades	William S. Hart	Fountain Valley	Arcadia
2015	San Pedro	Buena	Valencia	William S. Hart	Vista	Mt. Carmel
2016	San Pedro	Chaffey	Aliso Niguel	William S. Hart	Vista	Mt. Carmel
2017	Highland	San Pedro	Aliso Niguel	Warren	Chino Hills	Mt. Carmel
2018	Monrovia	San Pedro	Aliso Niguel	William S. Hart	Warren	Mt. Carmel
2019	Grover Cleveland	University City	San Pedro	Aliso Niguel	West Ranch	Mt. Carmel
2020	Field Band Championships cancelled due to COVID-19 Pandemic					
2021	Grover Cleveland	Westlake	South Hills	West Ranch	Chino	Rancho Bernardo
2022	Castaic	Valencia	Vista	William S. Hart	Chino	Rancho Bernardo
2023	Damien	Moorpark	Thousand Oaks	West Ranch	Arroyo	Rancho Bernardo
2024	Damien	Valencia	Grover Cleveland	William S. Hart	Chino	Rancho Bernardo
2025	Charter Oak	Valencia	Thousand Oaks	Grover Cleveland	West Ranch	Arcadia
