= Stevenson Ranch shootout =

Shootout in Stevenson Ranch, California

- Location: Stevenson Ranch, California
- Date: August 31, 2001; 25 years ago, United States
- Attack type: Shootout, murder-suicide
- Weapon: Firearm
- Deaths: 2 (Kuredjian and the perpetrator)
- Injuries: 0
- Perpetrator: James Allen Beck

On August 31, 2001, a shootout occurred in Stevenson Ranch, an unincorporated community in Santa Clarita Valley, California. It resulted in the immediate deaths of James Allen Beck, a convicted felon, and Hagop "Jake" Kuredjian, a sheriff's deputy. Ten years later, ATF agent Jeff Ryan committed suicide resulting from the traumatic ordeal.

== Background ==
James Allen Beck (January 12, 1966 – August 31, 2001) attended Palisades High and later the Rio Hondo College police academy. He worked for the Arcadia, California Police Department before being fired during the probationary period. Subsequently, he impersonated law enforcement officers, typically a U.S. marshal. Beck worked at odd jobs. He was convicted in separate instances of burglary, receiving stolen property, and possession of an assault weapon. The Bureau of Alcohol, Tobacco and Firearms (ATF) had conducted a search of Beck's residence, at another address, prior to 2001 without any resistance.

Beck's mother purchased a home for him in Stevenson Ranch, California. He was known for having a large collection of guns at his home. Neighbors noticed surveillance vans targeting him. One tip resulted in the confrontation.

== Shootout ==
ATF received information in 2000 that Beck, a felon, was buying large amounts of ammunition for assault weapons. On August 31, 2001, eight ATF agents, two U.S. marshals, and three Los Angeles County sheriff's deputies visited Beck's home to serve a search warrant. Beck refused to come out and started firing upon the officers. Early in the gunfight one of the deputies, Hagop "Jake" Kuredjian, was shot by Beck from a 2nd floor window and was killed instantly.

A SWAT team responded. During the gunfight, law enforcement officers fired an estimated 555 rounds at Beck and at neighbors' houses. Beck himself is estimated to have shot "hundreds if not thousands" of rounds. He fired on sheriff and news helicopters with large caliber ammunition.

Four hours into the standoff, a fire broke out in Beck's home, probably resulting from a hot tear-gas canister. Firefighters worked to prevent the fire's spread to other homes. Because of the ongoing threat, they did not dare try to put out the fire in Beck's house. Shots continued to be fired by Beck until the roof collapsed.

The rubble of Beck's burned-out home was too compromised for coroners to determine the cause of his death.

Critics of the ATF's actions, including members of the Los Angeles County Board of Supervisors, said that the bureau had failed to prepare for a violent response and did not properly warn the County Sheriff's Department of the potential risks, including Beck's stockpile of weapons.

== Legacy ==
=== Hagop "Jake" Kuredjian ===
Hagop "Jake" Kuredjian (June 5, 1961 – August 31, 2001), born in Aleppo, Syria, to an Armenian family, was a 17-year veteran of the Sheriff's Department. He had received a medal for saving the life of a woman dangling from a cliff in Malibu. The family of slain deputy Kuredjian received a $650,000 settlement from Beck's home-owner's insurance for a wrongful death claim.

In Stevenson Ranch a six-acre park has been named "Jake Kuredjian Park". A street in Newhall, Santa Clarita, California was named Deputy Jake Drive after him. The City of Malibu created the "Jake Kuredjian Citizenship Award", given annually to "outstanding individuals who give their time and resources to enhance the quality of recreation programs." Seventeen rosebushes, one for each year of his service, were planted in his memory at the Santa Clarita Valley Sheriff's Station. An 11-year old neighbor and three of his friends collected over $8,000 for the family. Donated money went to open a library in a village in Armenia, and to fund scholarships for students interested in law enforcement.

=== Jeff Ryan ===
Jeffrey P. Ryan (March 17, 1972 – September 19, 2011) had joined the ATF as an agent just 37 days before the shootout. He formerly served with US Air Force from 1990 to 1994 during both of the Gulf Wars and the Bosnian War and served with U.S. Border Patrol from 1996 to 2001. He was next to Kuredjian when the deputy was shot, and the gunfire forced him to stay beside Kuredjian for ten minutes before they could be moved to safety. Ryan suffered from severe post-traumatic stress disorder as a result. Ten years later, he committed suicide, leaving behind a widow and two children.

=== Neighbors ===
The house adjoining Beck's home was mistakenly targeted by law enforcement officers, resulting in more than 100 rounds being fired into the structure. The residents, a married couple with their newborn infant, took shelter on their bathroom floor during the barrage. Unhurt, they subsequently filed a $500,000 claim against the county, alleging "deliberate indifference". They settled for $200,000. $32,500 was given to another neighbor who had been trapped in his home during the shootout and whose home was hit by about 30 rounds.

== See also ==
- List of homicides in California
