= Saugus High School (California) =

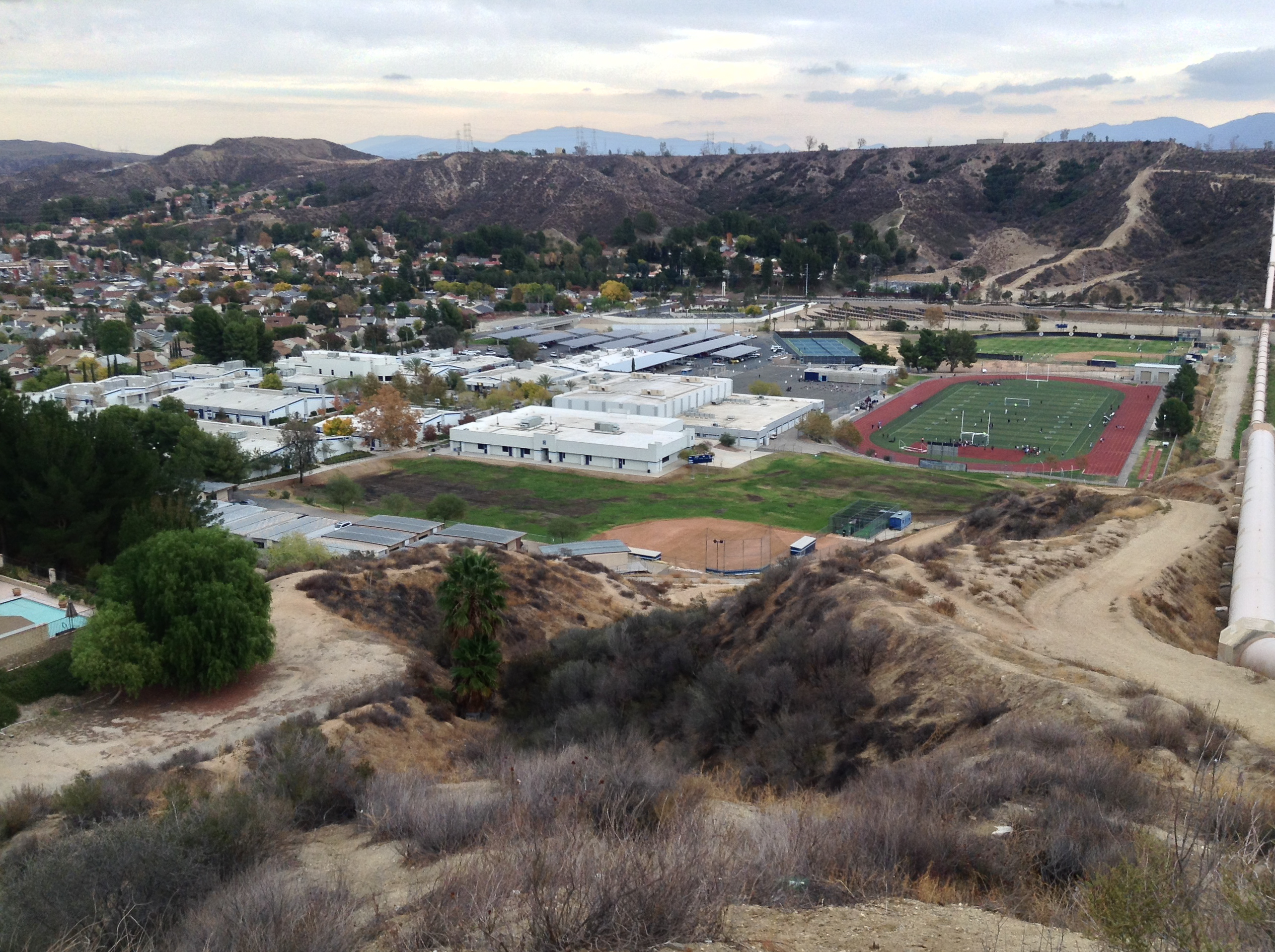
- View from a ridge overlooking campus, 2014

Location
- 21900 Centurion Way; Santa Clarita, California 91350; US; 34.4408°N 118.5178°W

Information
- Type: Comprehensive school
- Established: September 6, 1975
- School district: William S. Hart Union High School District
- NCES District ID: 0642510
- NCES School ID: 064251006961
- Principal: Genevieve Peterson-Henry
- Teaching staff: 95.15 (FTE)
- Grades: 9 - 12
- Enrollment: 2,295 (2023–2024)
- Student to teacher ratio: 24.12
- Campus: Suburban
- Colors: Blue; Silver
- Athletics: Baseball, Basketball, Cheer, Cross Country, Football, Golf, Lacrosse, Soccer, Softball, Swim and Dive, Tennis, Track and Field, Volleyball
- Athletics conference: CIF Southern Section; Foothill League
- Nickname: Centurions
- Newspaper: The Saugus Scroll
- Yearbook: Sword & Shield
- Website: www.sauguscenturions.com

Saugus High School is a public high school located in the neighborhood of Saugus in the city of Santa Clarita, California, United States. It is part of the William S. Hart Union High School District.

== Campus and facilities ==
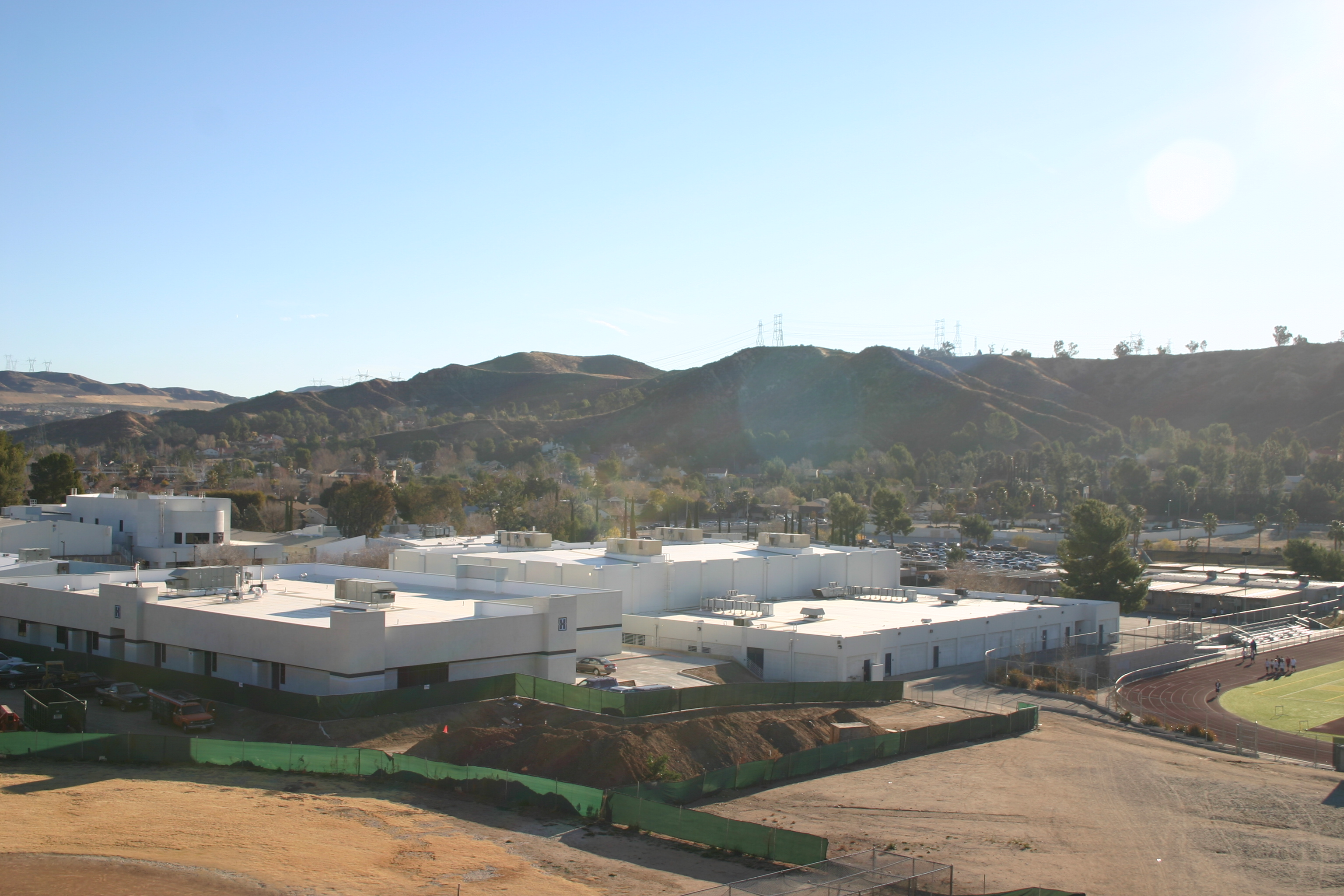
Saugus campus in 2007. Note the plowing of a new grass field in the foreground.

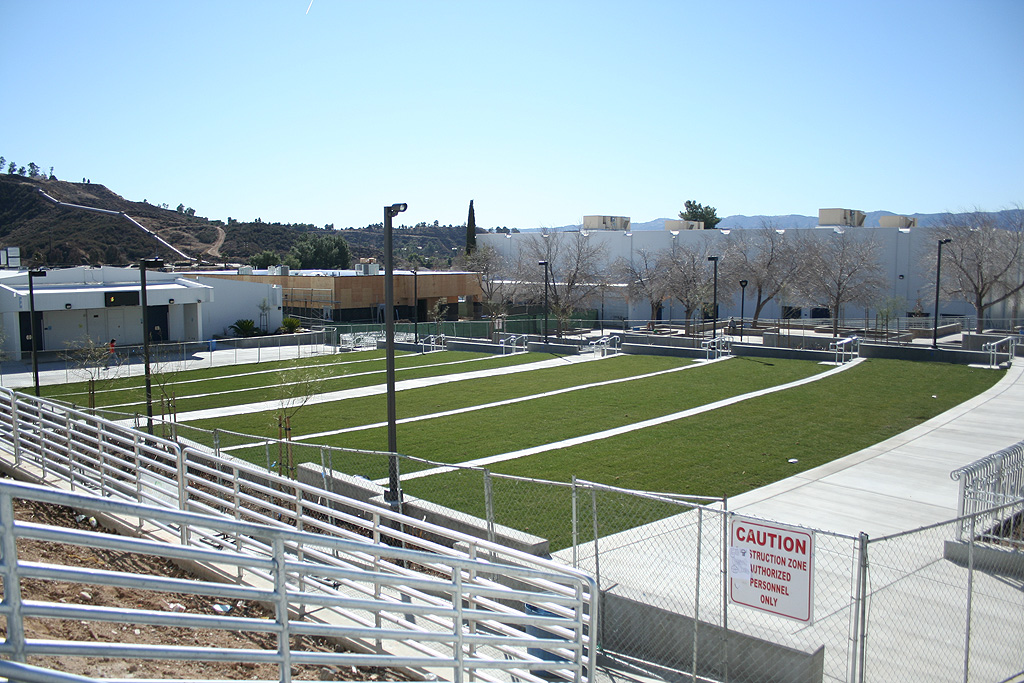
The quad, a grassy knoll with paved footpaths located at the center of the campus.

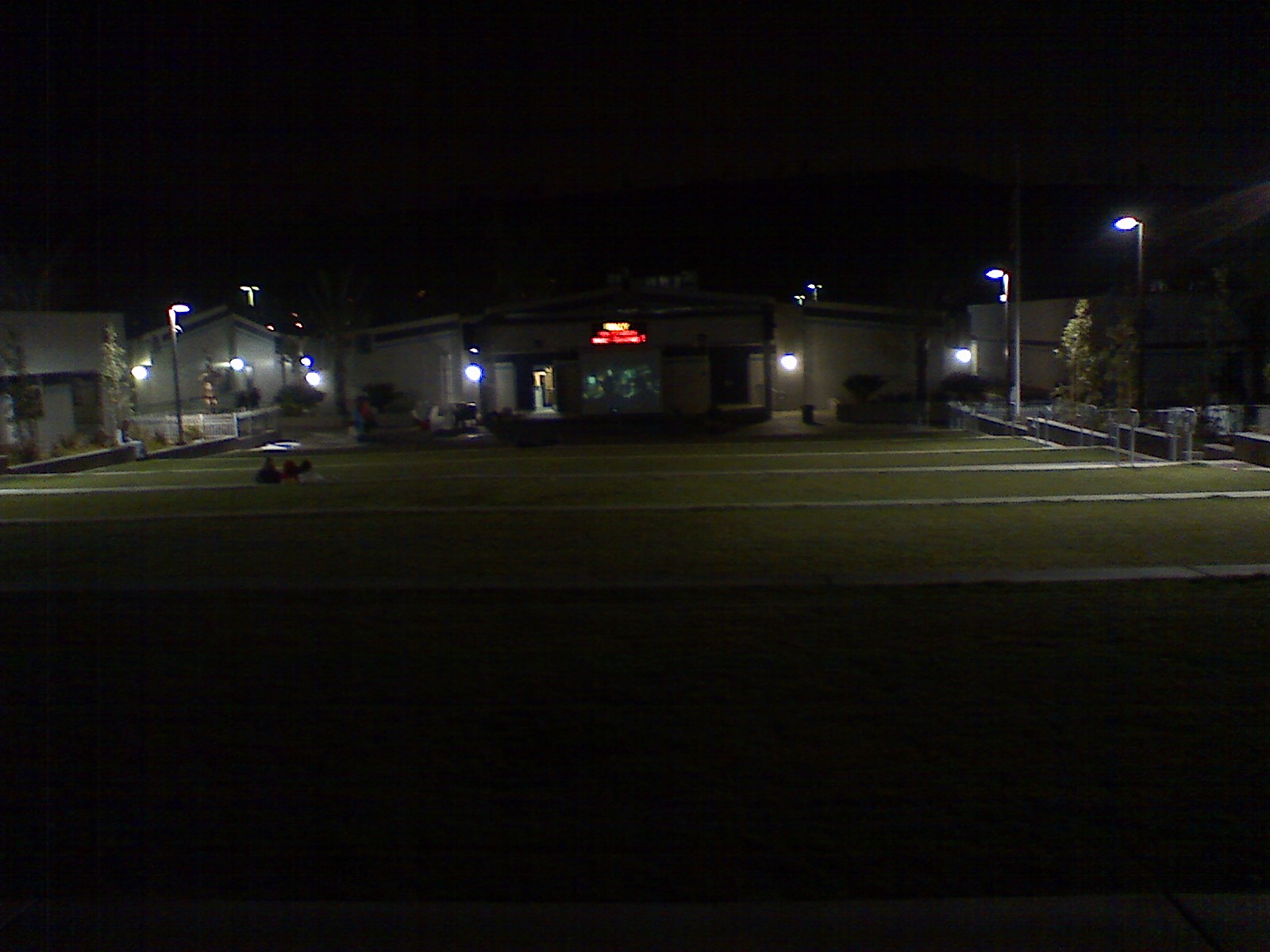
Quad at night

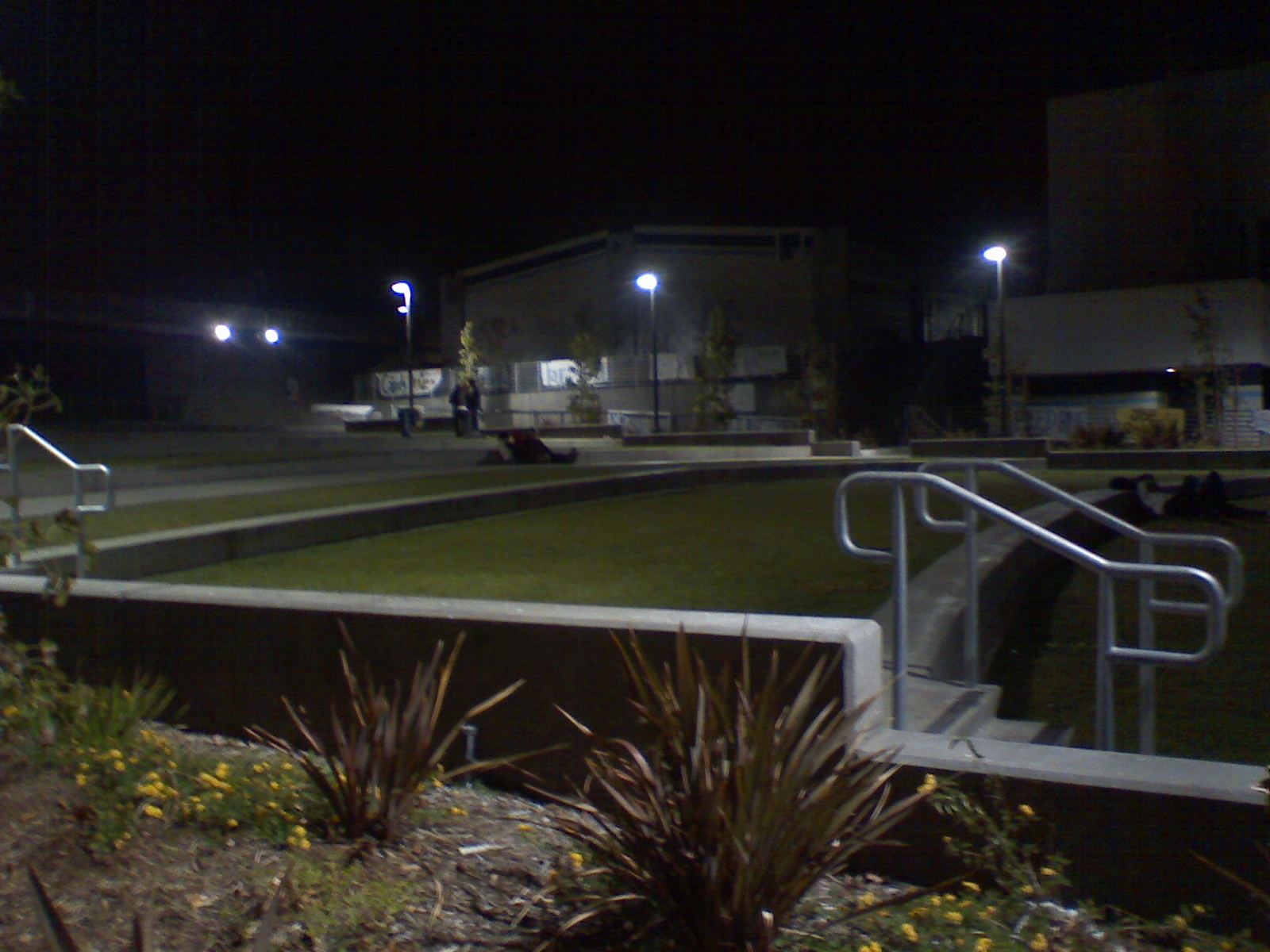
Saugus' quad

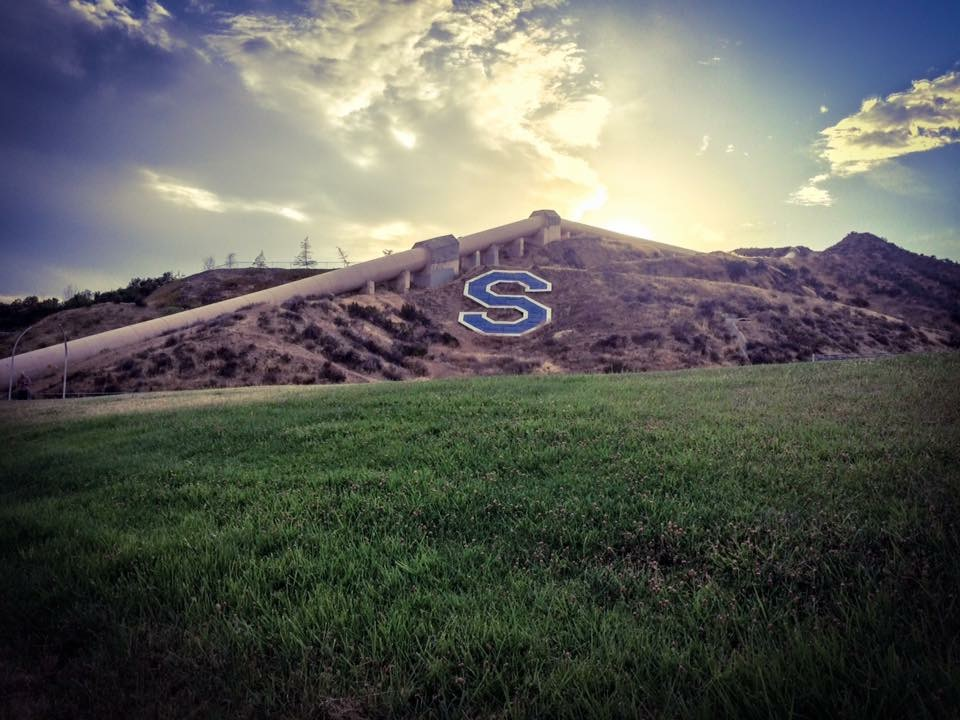
This is the hill behind Saugus High School, commonly deemed as the "S" hill for the letter that stands upon it, abbreviating the school it represents. The pipe in the photo is the Los Angeles Aqueduct.

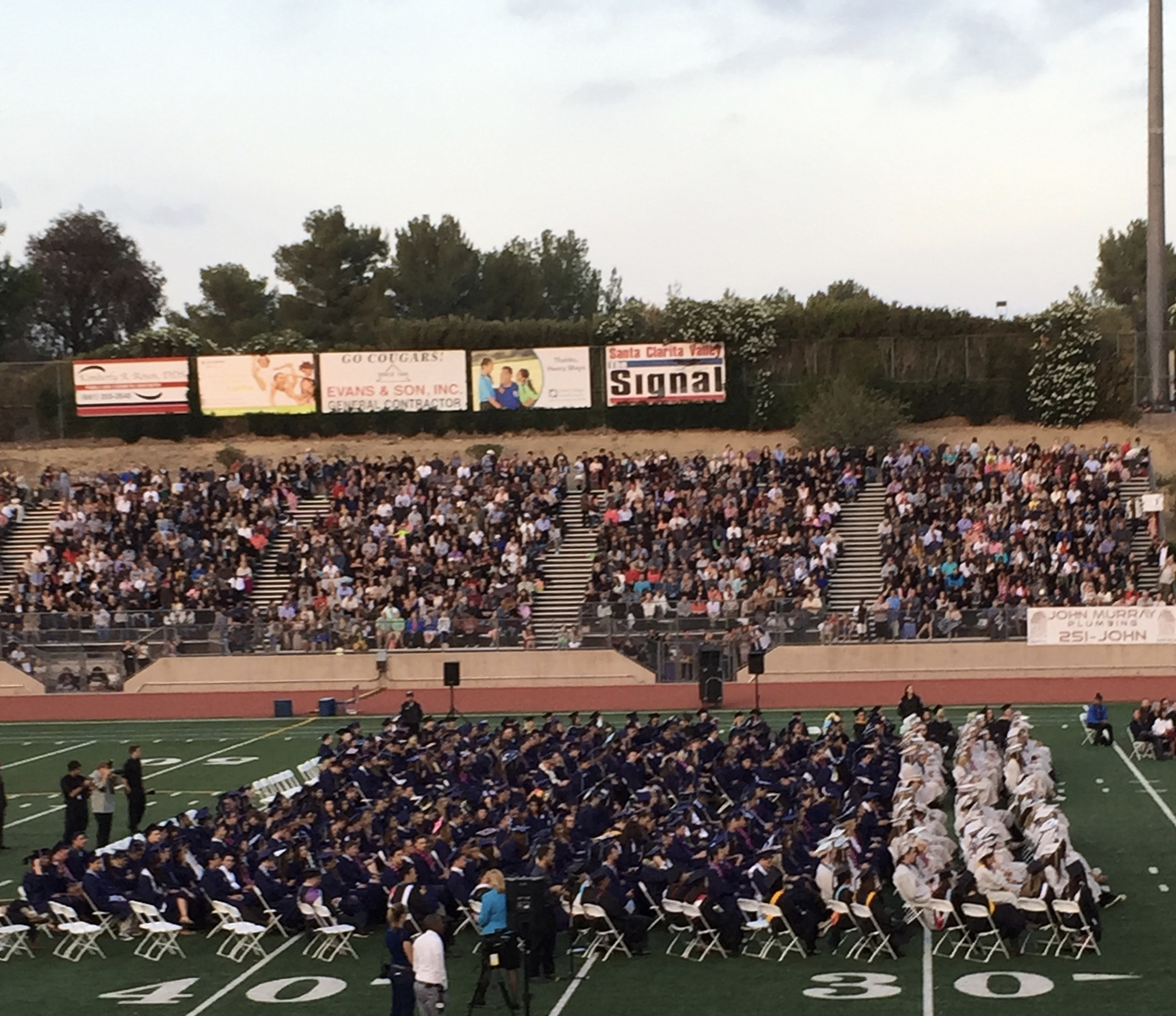
The College of the Canyons football stadium is a venue for many of Saugus High School's events, including football games and graduations

Saugus High School is located just north of the geographic center of Santa Clarita. The school's campus is built on a hill, with a leveled upper and lower campus and a sloped quad in between the two campuses. The A, B, C, D, E, F, and G buildings are located on the lower campus. Generally speaking, elective classes are located on the lower campus. The theater arts, choir, and band classes are housed in building E. The ASB and student store are housed in the A building, art and ceramics classes in the B building, and computer and business classes in the C building. Video, wood, auto shop, and other elective classes are in the D building. Some core classes are scattered throughout the lower campus nonetheless. The campus is bounded on the east by Centurion Way, on the south by Bouquet Creek, and on the west by the Los Angeles Aqueduct.

The upper campus is larger than the lower campus and houses teachers that teach core subjects. Teachers who teach an elective alongside their core class also teach their elective class here. It houses the H, J, K, L, M, P, Q, R, S, and X buildings. In buildings H, K, and Q are English classes, although some English classes are scattered in the L, P, and A buildings due to a lack of space. In building J is the math department, in L are social studies classes, in M is the world language department, in P and R are history classes, and in the S building is the S lecture hall.

The two-story Y building is located on both upper and lower campus, with the offices portion on the first floor, in the lower campus, and the library located on the second floor in the upper campus.

Saugus High has multiple entrances. The main entrance is at Centurion Colonnade located between the Y and A buildings in the lower campus, next to Centurion Way. Other lower campus entrances include the student parking lot D gate, auto compound gate, basketball courts gate, and the gate located towards the end of the football field. There are two entrances on the upper campus. The "driveway" is located behind the K and J buildings, leading up to Centurion Way.

Many of Saugus's renovations were completed in September 2007. These renovations included a new X building, the football field, the gym, the amphitheater, the refurbishing of the A, B, C, E, F, H, J, L, K, Q, M, P, R, and S buildings, a new cafeteria, a new student store, ASB office, library and administration building. During the modernization, the D building in the lower campus and the W weight room building next to the field were not altered, except for the new exterior paint the D building got to match the school's new and modern look. During the summer of 2011, the D building went through extensive renovation in order to modernize the current electives up to today's standards. Room D5 which houses video production, and TV production (SNN) will expand and receive a new television studio. Wood shop and the auto compound will also expand and receive new equipment. New facilities and accommodations continue to arise on campus including a 1,900 square feet (177 m^{2}) performing arts center which includes a large performance stage, 468 audience seats, catwalks, a fly room for lights and set rigging, spaces for drama rooms, and a large lobby and ticketing area.

The school newspaper is known as the Saugus Scroll.

== 2019 mass shooting ==
On November 14, 2019, a school shooting occurred at the high school. That morning, Nathaniel Berhow, an 11th-grade student at the school, pulled a semi-automatic pistol from his backpack and opened fire on the school's quad, killing two students (a 15-year-old girl and 14-year-old boy) and injuring three others. Berhow concluded the attack by shooting himself in the head; he died from his injuries the following day. The shooter carried out the attack on his 16th birthday.

On May 26, 2022, two days after the Robb Elementary School shooting in Uvalde, Texas, dozens of Saugus High School students walked out of class and protested in the school's quad, advocating for stronger gun control laws. Some students left the school entirely and staged a protest at the corner of Centurion Way and Bouquet Canyon Road. The walkout was led by Mia Tretta, a survivor of the Saugus shooting and junior at the school.

== Curriculum ==
Saugus High School runs on a block schedule. There are 4 class periods per day, A rotation of periods 1, 2, and 3 and 4, 5, and 6 on blue and silver days respectively, with period 7 happening every day. Period 1/4 begins at 8:30 a.m. and runs to 10:20 a.m., followed by a 20-minute brunch. Period 2/5 begins at 10:45 a.m. and runs to 12:25 p.m., with a 35-minute lunch, running to 1:00 p.m. Lastly, period 3/6 begins at 1:05 p.m. and runs to 2:45 p.m. This is typically the end of the school day, except for students who have 7th period from 2:50 p.m. to 3:40 p.m. Mondays are usually late start and begin at 9:19 a.m., with all classes occurring in shorter periods. These days end at 2:53 p.m. Saugus offers basic courses as well as many Honors and Advanced Placement (AP) courses. Each morning (except for Mondays), Saugus News Network (SNN) is shown. AFJROTC is offered as well to students.

Advanced Placement classes are offered in the following subjects: English Language and Composition, English Literature, Government, US History, European History, World History, Human Geography, Environmental Science, Chemistry, Biology, Physics, Calculus AB, Calculus BC, Statistics, Art History, Studio Art, Computer Science Principles, Spanish, French, and Chinese.

== Activities ==
The school colors are blue and silver and its mascot is the centurion. Saugus competes in football, cross country, basketball, softball, track and field, golf, volleyball, tennis, soccer, baseball, swim and dive, and lacrosse.

=== Band ===
The Saugus High School Band includes multiple ensembles, being marching, concert, orchestra, jazz, salsa, winter guard, and winter percussion.

=== Cheer ===
Saugus High School's competitive cheer team under the leadership of head coach Candace Rodgers has competed at the national level in the last 5 years. Their championships include the following 2023: Orlando Florida National Champion Junior Varsity Non Tumbling 1st place, National Gameday 3rd place, National Varsity Worlds 3rd place Anaheim CA Usa Nationals 1st Place. JV Grand Champions Cheerpros USA Pasadena CA 2021-2024 4x CIF Champions https://www.saugushighschoolcheer.com/ https://www.varsity.com/uca/school/competitions/high-school-nationals/ https://www.instagram.com/p/C4wQavePxwZ/ https://www.instagram.com/p/C2oLNDhr2Lx/?img_index=1 https://signalscv.com/2024/02/saugus-cheer-brings-home-cif-national-titles/

=== Cross country ===
Saugus's girls cross country team competes on a national level. The team took first in the Division 1 California State Championships in 2006 and 2007 while winning the Division II title in 2008, 2009, 2010, and 2011 finishing second overall in the Nike Nationals competition in 2007 and 2008. They hold the course record on the renowned Mt. Sac cross country course and 6 of the top 10 all-time team times on the course.

=== Dance ===
The Saugus dance team has won regional and national awards. They compete in national, state, and regional competitions, earning national titles from the years 2003 to 2008 and 2010 to 2016. In the 2015–2016 competition season, they won national titles in the Small, Medium, and Intermediate categories at the USA Dance Nationals and were also awarded the highest score in the dance category. The team also earned the title of National Grand Champions and National Intermediate Champions at the West Coast Elite Nationals (WCE). The dance team has been named state champions and most recently been named 2017 National Champions in the Large Lyrical category at WCE.

=== Football ===
Saugus High School's football team, long overshadowed by surrounding high schools Hart, Canyon, and Valencia, had a turnaround season in 2006, in which they made it into the second game of playoffs. Their talent continued as the Centurions advanced to the semi-finals of the CIF Southern Section championship in the 2007 season. The team was ousted by St. Bonaventure High School on December 1, 2007, by a score of 55–36. The football team won the Foothill League Championship for the first time in 2008.

== Student demographics ==
As of the 2022–3 school year, 2,378 students were enrolled at Saugus High. Of those, 44.4% were non-Hispanic white, 38.6% were Hispanic, 9.3% were Asian American, and 3.2% were African American. As of 2020–21, 484 students (19.5% of the student body) were eligible for free or reduced-price lunch.

== In popular culture ==
Saugus High School was used as the filming location for "Hubert Humphrey High" in the 1990 film Pump Up The Volume. It was also shown in a couple of episodes of the show Recovery Road and the Lifetime movie The Wrong Crush.

== Notable alumni ==
- Shawn Barton (1981) – former MLB pitcher for the Seattle Mariners and San Francisco Giants
- Tyler Blackburn (2004) – actor (best known as Caleb Rivers on Freeform's Pretty Little Liars)
- Mike Garcia (1994) – former U.S. representative for California's 27th congressional district
- Mandy Gonzalez (1996) – actress and singer (Broadway: Aida, Lennon, In the Heights, Wicked)
- Katie Hill (2004) – former U.S. representative for California's 25th congressional district
- C. Thomas Howell (1984) – actor, E.T. the Extra-Terrestrial, The Outsiders, Red Dawn, The Hitcher
- Tessa Ludwick (2006) – actress (Disney's Movie Surfers)
- Tommy Milone (2005) – former professional baseball pitcher
- Sara Niemietz (2010) – actress and singer (movie: Akeelah and the Bee, television: Glee)
- Roger Salkeld (1989) – former MLB pitcher for the Seattle Mariners and Cincinnati Reds
- David Smith (2003) - U.S. Olympic Team Men's Volleyball
- Bobby Trendy (1991) – interior designer
- Katie Volding (2007) – actress (movies: Smart House, Au Pair, Au Pair II, Au Pair 3: Adventure in Paradise)
- Abbey Weitzeil (2014) – 2016 U.S. Olympic Team, swimmer specializing in sprint freestyle; two-time Olympic medallist

== See also ==
- Central Park – a nearby public park
