= Darryl Ingram =

American football player (born 1966)

No. 86, 83, 88
- Position: Tight end

Personal information
- Born: May 2, 1966 (age 60); Lubbock, Texas, U.S.
- Listed height: 6 ft 3 in (1.91 m)
- Listed weight: 228 lb (103 kg)

Career information
- High school: Hart (Newhall, California)
- College: California
- NFL draft: 1989: 4th round, 108th overall pick

Career history
- Minnesota Vikings (1989); San Francisco 49ers (1991)*; Cleveland Browns (1991); Green Bay Packers (1992–1993)
- * Offseason or practice squad member only

Career NFL statistics
- Receptions: 5
- Receiving yards: 47
- Touchdowns: 1
- Stats at Pro Football Reference

Darryl Ingram (born May 2, 1966) is an American former professional football player who was a tight end in the National Football League (NFL). He played college football for the California Golden Bears.

== Biography ==
Ingram was born on May 2, 1966, in Lubbock, Texas.

== Career ==
He played for William S. Hart High School in Newhall, California.

He played at the collegiate level at the University of California, Berkeley.

Pre-draft measurables
Height	Weight	40-yard dash	10-yard split	20-yard split	20-yard shuttle	Vertical jump	Broad jump	Bench press
6 ft 2 3/4 in (1.90 m)	228 lb (103 kg)	4.79 s	1.65 s	2.83 s	4.49 s	30.0 in (0.76 m)	9 ft 6 in (2.90 m)	16 reps
All values from NFL Combine

Ingram was selected 108th overall by the Minnesota Vikings in the fourth round of the 1989 NFL draft and spent his first season with the team. After a year away from the NFL, he spent the 1991 NFL season with the Cleveland Browns and the next two with the Green Bay Packers.
