= Pico, California =

Pico, California may refer to:

- A settlement near Whittier, California that is now the northern portion of Pico Rivera, California
- Pico-Union, Los Angeles, California
- Pico Canyon, California; now part of Stevenson Ranch, California
