= Cole Roederer =

American baseball player (born 1999)

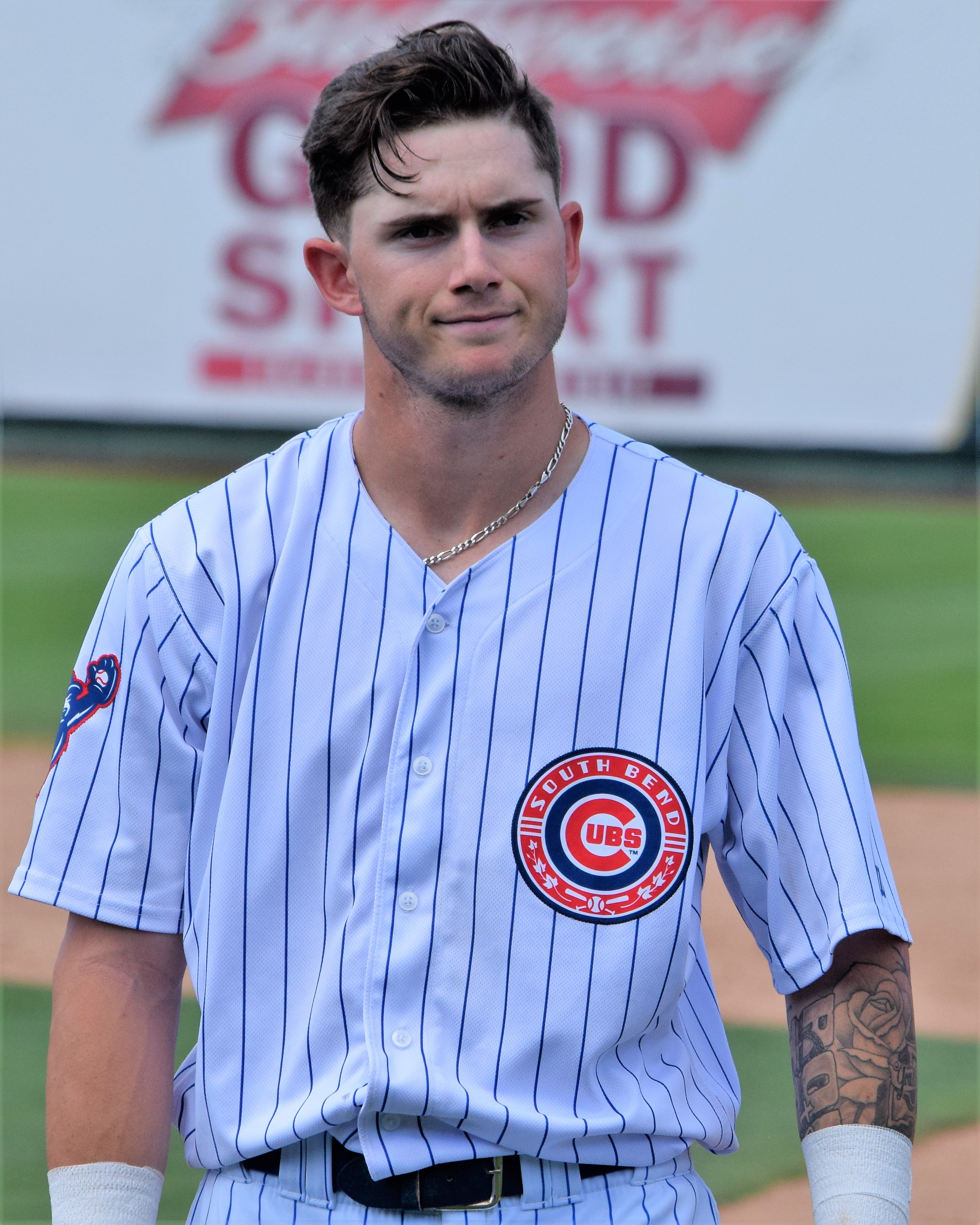
- Roederer in 2019 with the South Bend Cubs

Gastonia Ghost Peppers – No. 4
- Outfielder
- Born: September 24, 1999 (age 26); Newhall, California, U.S.
- Bats: Left Throws: Left

Cole Roederer (born September 24, 1999) is an American professional baseball outfielder for the Gastonia Ghost Peppers of the Atlantic League of Professional Baseball.

== Career ==
=== Chicago Cubs ===
Roederer attended William S. Hart High School in Santa Clarita, California. In 2018, as a senior, he batted .392 with seven home runs and 19 RBI. After his senior year, the Chicago Cubs drafted Roederer with the 77th overall pick of the 2018 Major League Baseball draft. He signed with the Cubs, forgoing his commitment to play college baseball at UCLA.

After signing, Roederer was assigned to the Rookie-level Arizona League Cubs. He homered in his first at-bat of his first professional game. He finished the year in Arizona batting .275 with five home runs, 24 RBI, and 13 stolen bases in 36 games. Roederer spent the 2019 season with the South Bend Cubs of the Single-A Midwest League, slashing .224/.319/.365 with nine home runs, sixty RBI, and 16 stolen bases over 108 appearances.

Roederer did not play in a game in 2020 due to the cancellation of the minor league season because of the COVID-19 pandemic. To begin the 2021 season, he returned to South Bend, now members of the High-A Central. Roederer underwent Tommy John surgery on his left arm in July, forcing him to miss the remainder of the season. Over seventy at-bats for the 2021 season, Roederer hit .229 with eight RBI, five doubles, and four stolen bases. He opened the 2022 season with the Myrtle Beach Pelicans of the Single-A Carolina League and was promoted to South Bend after four games. After 14 games with South Bend, Roederer was promoted to the Tennessee Smokies of the Double-A Southern League. Over 71 games between the three affiliates, he slashed .245/.314/.412 with nine home runs, 37 RBI, and eight stolen bases.

Roederer returned to Tennessee to open the 2023 season and was promoted to the Iowa Cubs of the Triple-A International League. Over 93 games played, Roederer batted .249 with 13 home runs and 53 RBI. He split the 2024 season between Tennessee and Iowa, hitting .186/.306/.311 with six home runs, 33 RBI, and seven stolen bases across 92 total appearances. Roederer elected free agency following the season on November 4, 2024.

=== Gastonia Ghost Peppers ===
On December 16, 2024, Roederer signed a minor league contract with the San Diego Padres organization. He was released prior to the start of the season on March 23, 2025.

On May 2, 2025, Roederer signed with the Gastonia Ghost Peppers of the Atlantic League of Professional Baseball. He made 113 appearances for the Ghost Peppers, batting .258/.375/.463 with 20 home runs, 70 RBI, and 26 stolen bases.

=== Saraperos de Saltillo ===
On April 14, 2026, Roederer signed with the Saraperos de Saltillo of the Mexican League. In 39 appearances for the Saraperos, he batted .216/.375/.392 with three home runs, nine RBI, and seven stolen bases. On June 11, Roederer was released by Saltillo.

=== Gastonia Ghost Peppers (second stint) ===
On June 24, 2026, Roederer signed with the Gastonia Ghost Peppers of the Atlantic League of Professional Baseball.
