= Fred Cornwell =

American football player (born 1961)

No. 85
- Position: Tight end

Personal information
- Born: August 7, 1961 (age 65); Osborne, Kansas, U.S.
- Listed height: 6 ft 6 in (1.98 m)
- Listed weight: 240 lb (109 kg)

Career information
- High school: Canyon (Santa Clarita, California)
- College: USC
- NFL draft: 1984: 3rd round, 81st overall pick

Career history
- Dallas Cowboys (1984–1985); Green Bay Packers (1987)*
- * Offseason or practice squad member only

Awards and highlights
- Second-team All-Pacific-10 (1983)

Career NFL statistics
- Receptions: 8
- Receiving yards: 100
- Touchdowns: 2
- Stats at Pro Football Reference

Frederick Keith Cornwell (born August 7, 1961) is an American former professional football player who was a tight end in the National Football League (NFL). He was selected by the Dallas Cowboys in the third round of the 1984 NFL draft. He played college football at the University of Southern California.

== Early life ==
Cornwell attended Canyon High School, where he practiced football, basketball and track (shot put).

He accepted a scholarship from the University of Southern California, where he contributed as a three-year starter with his blocking at the tight end position. As a senior, he registered 22 receptions for 236 yards and one touchdown.

He is mostly known for catching a touchdown pass from quarterback John Mazur with two seconds left, that gave his team a 28-24 victory over second ranked Oklahoma. Prior to this play, he only had one reception in his college career.

== College statistics ==
- 1981: 3 catches for 19 yards and 1 touchdown.
- 1982: 8 catches for 69 yards.
- 1983: 22 catches for 236 yards and 1 touchdown.

== Professional career ==
Cornwell was selected by the Dallas Cowboys in the third round (81st overall) of the 1984 NFL draft, with the team looking to improve the depth of the tight end position after the retirement of Billy Joe Dupree. He was also selected by the Los Angeles Express in the 1984 USFL Territorial Draft.

As a rookie, he missed 2 games with a back injury and was mainly used for blocking on short yardage situations. He didn't have much experience as a receiver and struggled executing the offense. He started against the Green Bay Packers as the second tight end.

In 1985, he appeared in 16 games. Against the Houston Oilers with the score tied at 10, he caught a one-yard touchdown pass with 1:51 minutes remaining to seal the win. He was released on August 25, 1986.
