= Stevenson Ranch, California =

Unincorporated community in California, United States

- Unincorporated community
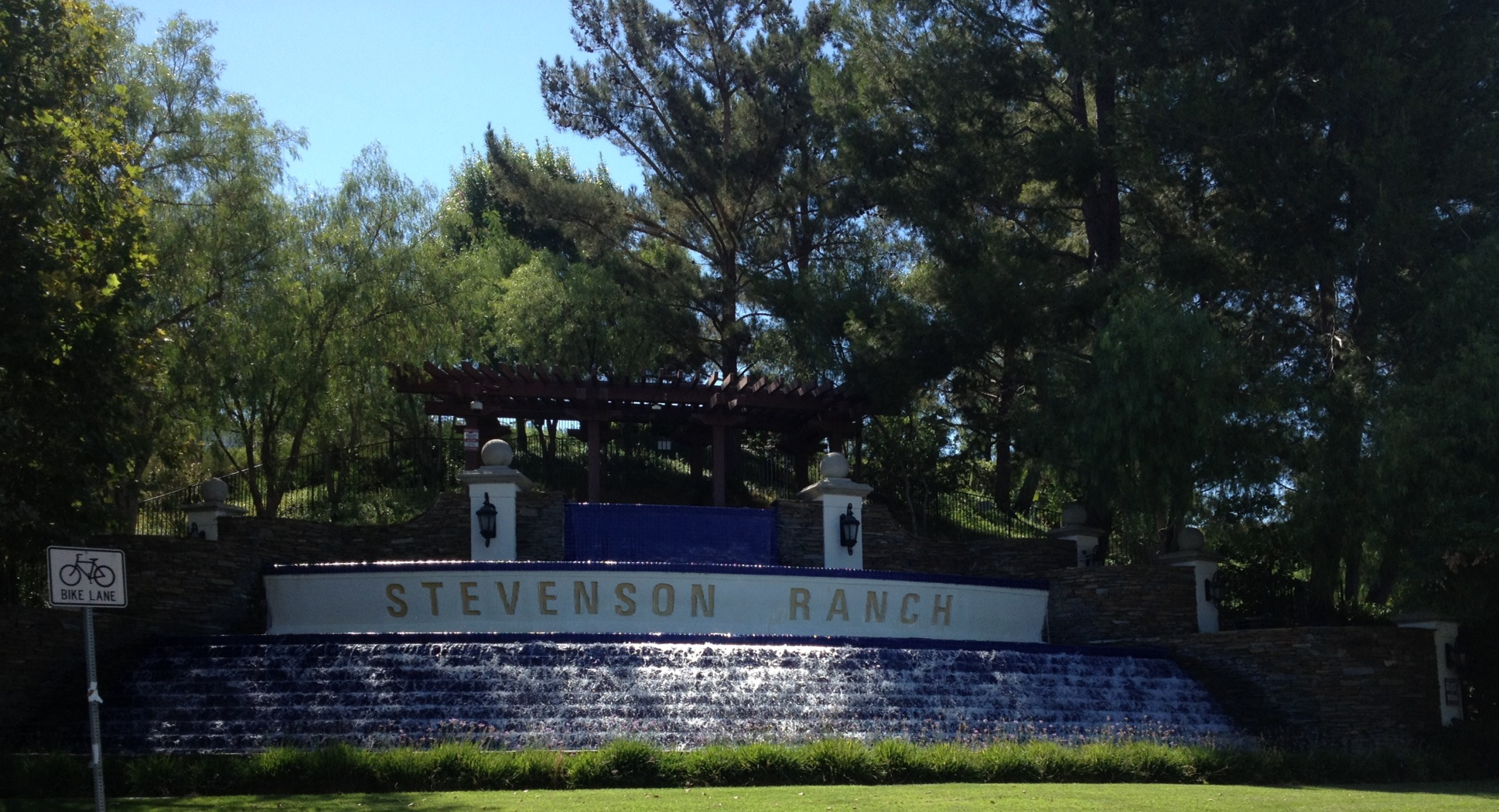
- Stevenson Ranch Fountain in 2012
- Interactive map of Stevenson Ranch, California
- Position in Santa Clarita Valley. Stevenson Ranch (the Los Angeles metropolitan area) Stevenson Ranch (California)
- Coordinates: 34.39°N 118.59°W
- Country: United States
- State: California
- County: Los Angeles

Area
  - Total: 6.413 sq mi (16.610 km^{2})
  - Land: 6.412 sq mi (16.608 km^{2})
  - Water: 0.00077 sq mi (0.002 km^{2}) 0.01%
- Elevation: 1,529 ft (466 m)

Population (2020)
  - Total: 20,178
  - Density: 3,146.7/sq mi (1,215.0/km^{2})
- Time zone: UTC-8 (Pacific (PST))
  - Summer (DST): UTC-7 (PDT)
- ZIP Code: 91381
- Area code: 661
- GNIS feature ID: 2583151
- Website: Official website

Stevenson Ranch is an unincorporated community in the Santa Clarita Valley of Los Angeles County, California, United States. Stevenson Ranch is set in the foothills of the Santa Susana Mountains and lies west of Interstate 5 and the city of Santa Clarita. Stevenson Ranch encompasses approximately 6.4 square miles (17 km^{2}). About 1,000 acres (4.0 km^{2}) are set aside as parks, recreation areas, and open space. A master-planned community, it was approved by the county Board of Supervisors in 1985. The population was 20,178 at the time of the 2020 census. For statistical purposes, the Census Bureau has designated it a census-designated place (CDP).

It is home to Stevenson Ranch, Pico Canyon, and Oak Hills elementary schools (part of the Newhall School District), and Rancho Pico Junior High and West Ranch High School (part of the William S. Hart Union High School District). The Valencia Marketplace and Stevenson Ranch Shopping Center are popular shopping areas in the community. Six Flags Magic Mountain, an amusement park, is located about three miles (4.8 km) north of Stevenson Ranch. The area backs up to the historic oil-mining town of Mentryville, founded in 1875.

It is also the filming location of several film and television productions, including the television show Weeds, a Showtime original series, as well as the feature film Pleasantville. Its master-planned nature is at the heart of the suburban commentary of Weeds, such as the "Little Boxes" song and sprawling development portrayed in the opening of the show.

== History ==
=== 1980s–2000s: Dale Poe and Development ===
In the early 1980s, land in what is now known as Stevenson Ranch was purchased by Dale Poe and his real estate agency Dale Poe Development Corp. (DPDC), which was based in Agoura. Born in New Mexico, Poe later moved to San Diego and married his wife Margaret in 1957. In the mid-1970s, he founded DPDC (formerly D&M; Construction), which became one of Southern California's biggest developers of master-planned communities. As explained by the website SCVHistory.com, "In late 1985, the Los Angeles County Board of Supervisors approved the first phase of 4,378 single-family homes, condominiums and apartments on 3,057 acres. Envisioned as an eventual 10,000-home community, construction started in 1988." In addition, Poe and his company agreed with the county "to donate 13 acres and $2.4 million for a new school in the fast-growing Newhall School District. The company will [also] donate more money and land as other phases of the project are approved." At the time, "donations ultimately could total $22 million." The timing of Poe's Stevenson Ranch development aligned with the rapid growth of the Santa Clarita Valley in the 1980s and 1990s. Poe broke ground on this subdivision in 1986.

As development began, the Stevenson Ranch complex saw controversies. Poe's company was sued by homeowners, "alleging faulty construction and failure to complete roads and build a promised swimming pool." In 1990, the city of Santa Clarita filed a lawsuit against DPDC by challenging "the adequacy of the environmental impact report prepared for the Stevenson Ranch expansion". There were concerns brought up by the Santa Clarita City Council over the amount of traffic, noise, and air pollution brought in by the new developments. In April 1991, DPDC agreed to pay Santa Clarita $675,000 for traffic improvements to settle the lawsuit.

Along with disputes over development, there was political disagreements between Santa Clarita and Poe. In the fall of 1989, the city attempted to place Stevenson Ranch in its "sphere of influence" in order to make the area eligible for annexation, but was rejected by the Local Agency Formation Commission (LAFCO). At the same time, vice president of DPDC, Jeff Stevenson, led a drive to incorporate Stevenson Ranch and other neighborhoods into a city called Sunset Hills, which was also rejected by the LAFCO due to a small tax base. As reported by the Los Angeles Times, "Santa Clarita council members bitterly dubbed the proposed city “Poe-dunk” and said the incorporation drive was launched only to keep Stevenson Ranch out of Santa Clarita."

On May 17, 1993, Poe and his wife were killed in a car accident near Delano, California, in Kern County. Three years later, "Poe's heirs sold their interest in Stevenson Ranch to Florida-based home builder Lennar Corp. — which gained a controlling interest in Newhall Land a few years later." By 1996, 1,500 homes were built in the community and it continued to grow until the mid-2000s. Poe Parkway, in Stevenson Ranch, with eventual plans to extend into Valencia, is named after him in legacy.

=== 2001: Stevenson Ranch Shootout ===
On August 31, 2001, a shootout occurred in Stevenson Ranch. After an attempt to serve a warrant to James Allen Beck, a convicted felon, he started firing upon ATF agents and police officer. During the gunfight, a sheriff's deputy, Hagop "Jake" Kuredjian, was shot by Beck and was killed instantly. Four hours into the standoff, a hot tear-gas canister was shot into Beck's home, probably starting a fire. The house eventually collapsed, which killed Beck in the process.

== Geography ==
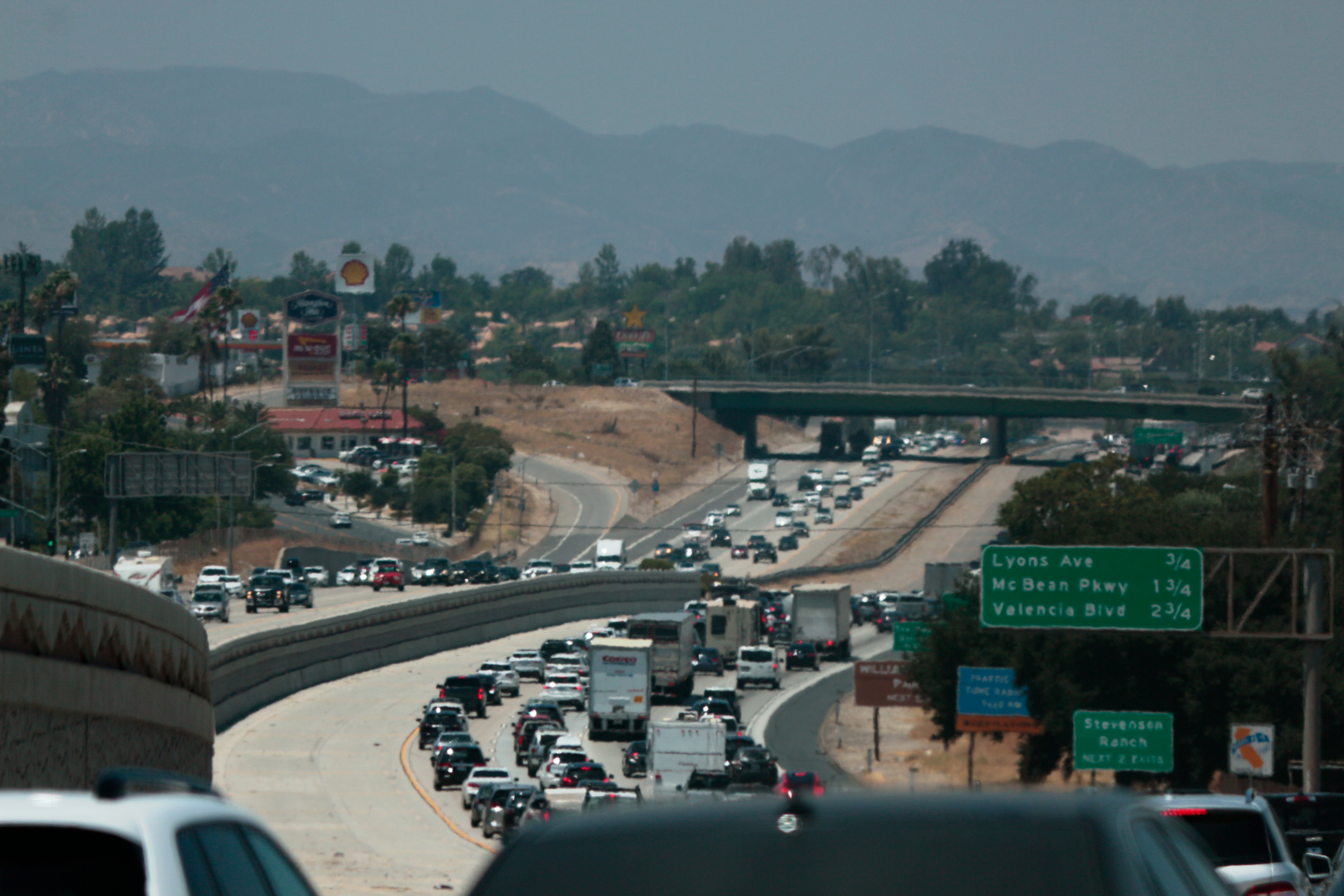
The southernmost part of Stevenson Ranch can be seen to the left of I-5 northbound in a July 2021 photo

The Stevenson Ranch census-designated place includes two major subdivisions: Westridge and Stevenson Ranch proper.

Stevenson Ranch proper occupies the central and southern parts of the census-designated place. It includes the Valencia Marketplace and two elementary schools (Stevenson Ranch and Pico Canyon). Major thoroughfares in the community include Poe Parkway, Hemingway Avenue, Pico Canyon Road, and Stevenson Ranch Parkway. Pico Canyon Road and Stevenson Ranch Parkway continue east into the city of Santa Clarita as Lyons Avenue and McBean Parkway, respectively.

Westridge occupies the northern part of the CDP. It includes Oak Hills Elementary School, Rancho Pico Junior High, and West Ranch High School. The Oaks Club at Valencia, a country club and golf course, is located in Westridge. The major east-to-west thoroughfare is Valencia Boulevard. It is a wealthy community, with some of the Santa Clarita Valley's most expensive real estate. Although Westridge lies in the Stevenson Ranch CDP and zip code 91381, it was developed as part of Valencia.

The two subdivisions are connected by The Old Road. Both subdivisions are located west of Interstate 5. The Valencia neighborhood of the city of Santa Clarita lies to the east and northeast, Newhall lies to the southeast, and unincorporated Valencia lies to the north.

== Government and infrastructure ==
The Los Angeles County Sheriff's Department (LASD) operates the Santa Clarita Valley Station in Santa Clarita, serving Stevenson Ranch for law enforcement. Traffic enforcement is handled by the California Highway Patrol (CHP). The city of Santa Clarita has tried unsuccessfully to annex Stevenson Ranch.

The names of many streets in Stevenson Ranch are those of authors (e.g., Thackeray, Hemingway, Shakespeare, and Poe).

== Demographics ==
Historical population
Census	Pop.	Note	%±
2010	17,557		—
2020	20,178		14.9%
U.S. Decennial Census; 2000 2010; 2020

Stevenson Ranch first appeared as a census designated place in the 2010 U.S. census.

=== Racial and ethnic composition ===
Stevenson Ranch CDP, California – Racial and ethnic composition Note: the US Census treats Hispanic/Latino as an ethnic category. This table excludes Latinos from the racial categories and assigns them to a separate category. Hispanics/Latinos may be of any race.
Race / Ethnicity (NH = Non-Hispanic)	Pop 2010	Pop 2020	% 2010	% 2020
White alone (NH)	9,469	9,094	53.93%	45.07%
Black or African American alone (NH)	571	790	3.25%	3.92%
Native American or Alaska Native alone (NH)	52	37	0.30%	0.18%
Asian alone (NH)	3,983	5,402	22.69%	26.77%
Native Hawaiian or Pacific Islander alone (NH)	25	26	0.14%	0.13%
Other race alone (NH)	59	157	0.34%	0.78%
Mixed race or Multiracial (NH)	571	1,043	3.25%	5.17%
Hispanic or Latino (any race)	2,827	3,629	16.10%	17.98%
Total	17,557	20,178	100.00%	100.00%

=== 2020 census ===
As of the 2020 census, Stevenson Ranch had a population of 20,178. The population density was 3,146.9 inhabitants per square mile (1,215.0/km^{2}), and 99.6% of residents lived in urban areas while 0.4% lived in rural areas.

The median age was 40.2 years. 24.4% of residents were under the age of 18 and 10.3% were 65 years of age or older. For every 100 females there were 95.8 males, and for every 100 females age 18 and over there were 93.1 males age 18 and over.

There were 6,804 households, of which 41.3% had children under the age of 18 living in them. Of all households, 62.5% were married-couple households, 4.6% were cohabiting couple households, 20.1% were households with a female householder and no spouse or partner present, and 12.9% were households with a male householder and no spouse or partner present. About 17.2% of all households were made up of individuals and 5.5% had someone living alone who was 65 years of age or older. The average household size was 2.97, and all residents lived in households.

There were 5,280 families (77.6% of all households).

There were 7,040 housing units at an average density of 1,097.9 units per square mile (423.9 units/km^{2}), of which 6,804 (96.6%) were occupied. Of these, 66.2% were owner-occupied and 33.8% were occupied by renters; 3.4% of all units were vacant, with a homeowner vacancy rate of 0.4% and a rental vacancy rate of 6.8%.

Racial composition as of the 2020 census
Race	Number	Percent
White	9,852	48.8%
Black or African American	832	4.1%
American Indian and Alaska Native	102	0.5%
Asian	5,447	27.0%
Native Hawaiian and Other Pacific Islander	29	0.1%
Some other race	1,355	6.7%
Two or more races	2,561	12.7%
Hispanic or Latino (of any race)	3,629	18.0%

=== 2010 census ===
The 2010 United States census reported that Stevenson Ranch had a population of 17,557. The population density was 2,759.6 inhabitants per square mile (1,065.5/km^{2}). The racial makeup of Stevenson Ranch was 11,271 (64.2%) White (53.9% Non-Hispanic White), 606 (3.5%) African American, 65 (0.4%) Native American, 4,028 (22.9%) Asian, 34 (0.2%) Pacific Islander, 765 (4.4%) from other races, and 788 (4.5%) from two or more races. Hispanic or Latino of any race were 2,827 persons (16.1%).

The Census reported that 17,557 people (100% of the population) lived in households, 0 (0%) lived in non-institutionalized group quarters, and 0 (0%) were institutionalized.

There were 5,663 households, out of which 3,006 (53.1%) had children under the age of 18 living in them, 3,761 (66.4%) were opposite-sex married couples living together, 533 (9.4%) had a female householder with no husband present, 231 (4.1%) had a male householder with no wife present. There were 251 (4.4%) unmarried opposite-sex partnerships, and 42 (0.7%) same-sex married couples or partnerships. Of the households, 828 (14.6%) were made up of individuals, and 227 (4.0%) had someone living alone who was 65 years of age or older. The average household size was 3.10. There were 4,525 families (79.9% of all households); the average family size was 3.48.

The population was spread out, with 5,659 people (32.2%) under the age of 18, 1,261 people (7.2%) aged 18 to 24, 4,871 people (27.7%) aged 25 to 44, 4,668 people (26.6%) aged 45 to 64, and 1,098 people (6.3%) who were 65 years of age or older. The median age was 36.5 years. For every 100 females, there were 95.2 males. For every 100 females age 18 and over, there were 91.0 males.

There were 5,842 housing units at an average density of 918.2 units per square mile (354.5 units/km^{2}), of which 4,171 (73.7%) were owner-occupied, and 1,492 (26.3%) were occupied by renters. The homeowner vacancy rate was 1.3%; the rental vacancy rate was 5.1%. Of the population, 13,819 (78.7%) lived in owner-occupied housing units, and 3,738 people (21.3%) lived in rental housing units.

=== Income ===
In 2023, the US Census Bureau estimated that the median household income was $146,404, and the per capita income was $60,011. About 3.3% of families and 4.8% of the population were below the poverty line.

== Education ==
The CDP is served by the Newhall Elementary School District and the William S. Hart Union High School District.

== Notable people ==
- Ryan Newman, actor
- El Hefe (Aaron Abeyta), guitarist
- Hunter Greene, professional baseball pitcher for Cincinnati Reds
