= C. J. Ravenell =

American football player (born 2000)

Profile
- Position: Defensive tackle

Personal information
- Born: July 7, 2000 (age 26); Santa Clarita, California, U.S.
- Listed height: 6 ft 5 in (1.96 m)
- Listed weight: 300 lb (136 kg)

Career information
- High school: Golden Valley (Santa Clarita)
- College: Missouri Western (2018–2023)
- NFL draft: 2024: undrafted

Career history
- Baltimore Ravens (2024)*; Tennessee Titans (2025); New York Giants (2026)*
- * Offseason or practice squad member only

Awards and highlights
- 2× Second-team All-MIAA (2022, 2023); Third-team All-MIAA (2021)

Career NFL statistics as of 2025
- Total tackles: 5
- Forced fumbles: 1
- Stats at Pro Football Reference

C. J. Ravenell (born July 7, 2000) is an American professional football defensive tackle. He played college football for the Missouri Western Griffons, who are in the NCAA Division II, before being picked up by the Baltimore Ravens as an undrafted free agent after the 2024 NFL draft.

== Early life ==
Ravenell was born on July 7, 2000, in Santa Clarita, California. He attended Golden Valley High School.

== College career ==
Ravenell played five seasons for the Missouri Western Griffons, and redshirting his first year in 2018. He earned various honors for the Division II program, including three academic awards, one All-MIAA 3rd team selection in 2021, and 2 All-MIAA 2nd team selections in 2022 and 2023.

=== College statistics ===
Legend
**Bold**	Career high

Year	Team	Games		Tackles					Fumbles		Interceptions		
Year	Team	GP	GS	Cmb	Solo	Ast	TFL	Sck	FF	FR	Int	Yds	PD
2019	Missouri Western	**12**	**12**	39	22	17	8.5	2	**2**	**1**	0	0	**1**
2021	Missouri Western	9	9	33	22	11	**12**	**7**	**2**	0	0	0	0
2022	Missouri Western	11	11	**47**	**31**	16	6.5	2.5	1	0	0	0	0
2023	Missouri Western	11	11	45	20	**25**	11	3	0	**1**	0	0	0
Career		43	43	164	95	69	38	14.5	5	2	0	0	1

== Professional career ==
Pre-draft measurables
Height	Weight	Arm length	Hand span	Wingspan	40-yard dash	10-yard split	20-yard split	20-yard shuttle	Three-cone drill	Vertical jump	Broad jump	Bench press
6 ft 5 1/4 in (1.96 m)	280 lb (127 kg)	32 7/8 in (0.84 m)	9 1/4 in (0.23 m)	6 ft 9 5/8 in (2.07 m)	5.07 s	1.75 s	2.93 s	4.83 s	7.75 s	30.5 in (0.77 m)	8 ft 1 in (2.46 m)	11 reps
All values from Missouri Western's Pro Day

=== Baltimore Ravens ===
Ravenell was picked up by the Ravens as an undrafted free agent. He played for them during the preseason, recording a sack on Kenny Pickett. He signed a reserve/futures contract on February 12, 2025.

On August 26, 2025, Ravenell was waived by the Ravens as part of final roster cuts.

=== Tennessee Titans ===
On August 27, 2025, Ravenell was claimed off waivers by the Tennessee Titans. Set to become a exclusive-rights free agent in the 2026 offseason, he re-signed with the Titans on March 5, 2026. On July 6, Ravenell was waived by the Titans with an injury designation.

=== New York Giants ===
On July 7, 2026, Ravenell was claimed off waivers by the New York Giants, reuniting him with head coach John Harbaugh and defensive coordinator Dennard Wilson. He was waived by the Giants on July 25. On September 22, Ravenell was re–signed to the team's practice squad. On October 14, he was released.
