= Newhall School District =

School district in Santa Clarita, California

Address
- 25375 Orchard Village Road Valencia, California, 91355; United States
- Coordinates: 34.3892°N 118.5475°W

District information
- Type: Public
- Grades: K–6
- Established: 1876
- Superintendent: Leticia Hernandez
- Schools: 10
- NCES District ID: 0627180

Students and staff
- Students: 5,834 (2021–2022)
- Teachers: 238.01 (FTE)
- Staff: 287.08 (FTE)
- Student–teacher ratio: 24.51:1

Other information
- Website: www.newhallschooldistrict.com

The Newhall School District is an elementary school district in the Santa Clarita Valley that serves the Valencia and Newhall communities within the city of Santa Clarita, California, as well as the Stevenson Ranch community in unincorporated Los Angeles County. It also includes the Westridge area. It currently includes ten schools.

== History ==
The first school in the district was Newhall Elementary. The school opened in 1876, near the current location of the Saugus Cafe. The school is named for Henry Mayo Newhall, as is the town. The school and the town of Newhall moved two years later, to a location 2 miles south of its original location. An oil boom in the Santa Clarita Valley brought the families of 53 students to area and the school was placed where the current Valencia Marketplace (Target store) currently stands. One year later, in 1879, a proper school house was built at the corner of 9th and Walnut streets, in the current town of Newhall. The building was a wooden, two-story building. The second story was used on weekends, for Sunday school classes. This original building succumbed to a fire in 1890.

A new two-story school was built on the same site as the first two-story building. Those students who continued on to high school faced a long horseback ride to San Fernando High School, in the San Fernando Valley, once that school was built in 1896. In 1914, a fire struck Newhall Elementary School again. Another building was built at the northwest corner of Lyons and Newhall Avenues. The older students were able to catch a ride in a converted automobile to San Fernando High School. In 1932, an actual bus was purchased. As the town grew, so did its school-aged population. The schoolhouse at Lyons and Newhall Ave. was not able to be expanded and so a new school was built in 1928 at the corner of 11th and Walnut streets. Fire hit the school again in 1939; however, the school was rebuilt where it stood. The school re-opened in 1940. This is the current location of Newhall Elementary School (2012).

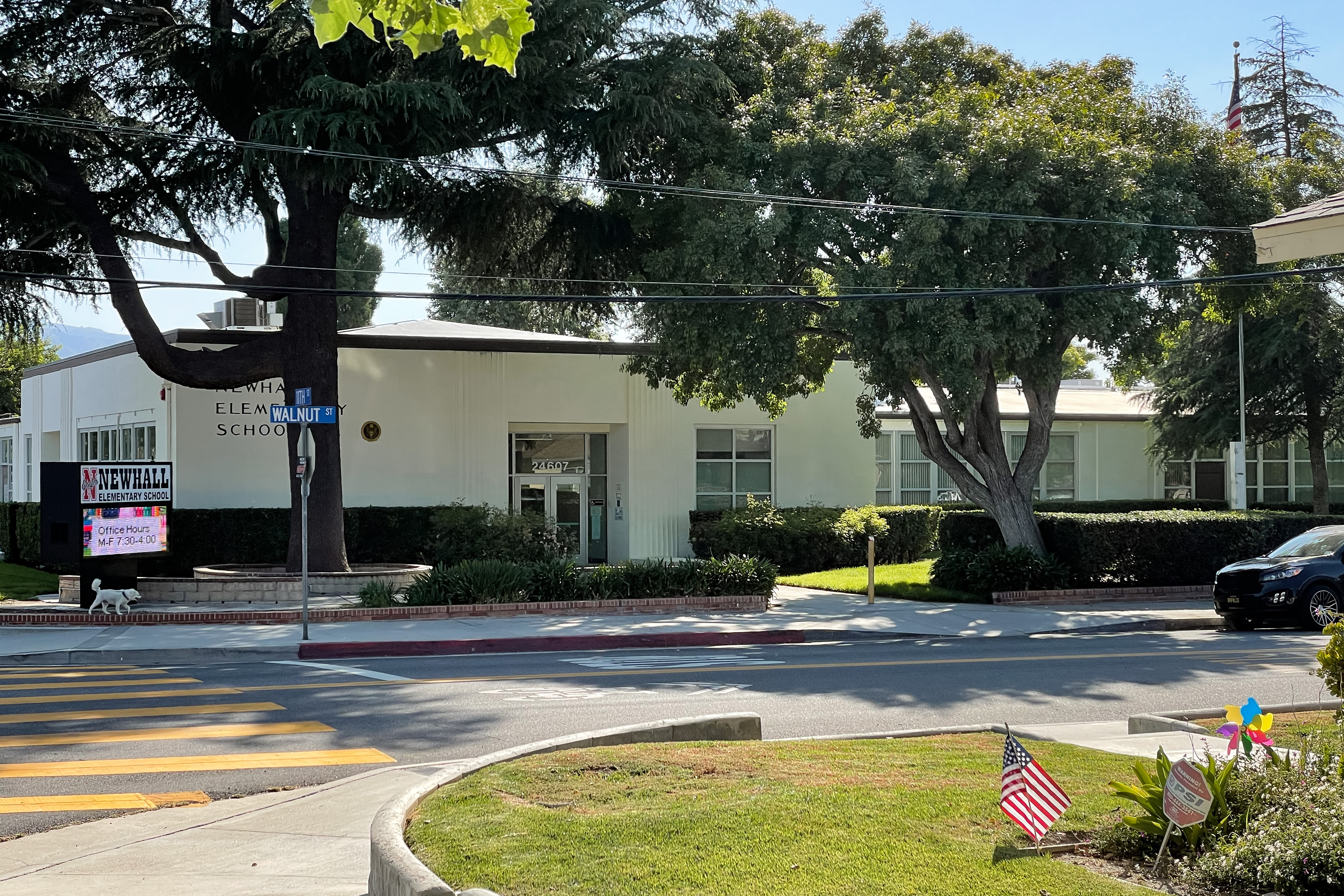
Newhall Elementary School, located on the corner of Walnut and 11th streets. The current school buildings date to 1940.

As for the older students, they would continue to travel until 1945 when Hart High School opened. The original grades were 9th–12th. In 1948, the 7th and 8th graders moved to Hart High School. Hart High stayed a 7th–12th grade school until Placerita Junior High School opened in 1961.

The second school in the Newhall School District was Peachland Elementary School which opened in 1959. The third was Wiley Canyon Elementary School which opened in 1966.

On January 13, 1945, the California State Board of Education approved the petitions of five Santa Clarita Valley school districts — Newhall, Saugus, Castaic, Mint Canyon and Sulphur Springs — to form the Santa Clarita Union High School District, later renamed the William S. Hart Union High School District. Two weeks later, on January 29, local voters approved a bond measure to build the valley's first high school on a 27-acre parcel on Newhall Avenue, just down the street from Newhall School (Hart High School).

The first Hart District school board was composed of school board members from each of the elementary districts. Tom Frew III and S.S. Donaldson represented the Newhall district. Donaldson was a sitting Newhall school board member, while Frew had already retired from a lengthy tenure on the Newhall board which included several years as president.

== Schools ==
All schools within the Newhall School District are located within the Newhall neighborhood of Santa Clarita or the unincorporated community of Stevenson Ranch.

Newhall School District elementary schools
School	Address	Founded	Enrollment (2022–23)
Dr. J. Michael McGrath Elementary	21501 Deputy Jake Drive, Santa Clarita, CA 91321	2003	492
Meadows Elementary	25577 Fedala Road, Santa Clarita, CA 91355	1975	672
Newhall Elementary	24607 Walnut Street, Santa Clarita, CA 91321	1879	536
Oak Hills Elementary	26730 Old Rock Road, Stevenson Ranch, CA 91381	2005	567
Old Orchard Elementary	25141 Avenida Rondel, Santa Clarita, CA 91355	1969	504
Peachland Avenue Elementary	24800 Peachland Avenue, Santa Clarita, CA 91321	1959	450
Pico Canyon Elementary	25255 Pico Canyon Road, Stevenson Ranch, CA 91381	1988	808
Stevenson Ranch Elementary	25820 Carroll Lane, Stevenson Ranch, CA 91381	1995	746
Valencia Valley Elementary	23601 Carrizo Drive, Santa Clarita, CA 91355	1988	741
Wiley Canyon Elementary	24240 La Glorita Circle, Santa Clarita, CA 91321	1966	409

== Student demographics ==
As of the 2022–23 school year, 5,927 students were enrolled in Newhall District schools. 45.9% of students were Hispanic or Latino, 29.7% were non-Hispanic white, 10.7% were Asian American, 6.1% were multiracial, 3.4% were Filipino, 1.7% were African American, 0.3% were Indigenous American, and 0.1% were Pacific Islander.

== See also ==
- Los Angeles Unified School District
- Saugus Union School District
- Sulphur Springs School District
