= Foothill League =

The Foothill League is a high school athletic conference in the Santa Clarita Valley area of Los Angeles County, California that is affiliated with the CIF Southern Section. All current members are part of the William S. Hart Union High School District.

== Schools ==
As of 2018, the schools in the league are:

- Canyon High School
- Castaic High School
- Golden Valley High School
- Hart High School
- Saugus High School
- Valencia High School
- West Ranch High School

=== Former members ===
- Burbank High School (through 2006; joined Pacific League
- Burroughs High School (through 2006; joined Pacific League)
- Glendale High School (through 1982; joined Pacific League)
- Herbert Hoover High School (through 1982; joined Pacific League)
- Blair High School (through 1982; joined Rio Hondo League)
- Alhambra High School (through 1992; joined Almont League)
- San Gabriel High School (through 1992; joined Almont League)
- Schurr High School (Montebello, California) (through 1992; joined Almont League)

== Sports ==
The Foothill League sponsors the following sports:

=== Fall season ===
- Football
- Cross country
- Girls' golf
- Girls' tennis
- Girls' volleyball

=== Winter season ===
- Basketball
- Soccer

=== Spring season ===
- Baseball
- Boys' golf
- Lacrosse
- Softball
- Swimming/Diving
- Track and field
- Boys' tennis
- Boys' volleyball

== History ==
The Foothill League is one of the earliest CIF-SS leagues in existence. Membership has historically included schools throughout Los Angeles County, including in the Santa Clarita Valley, Burbank, Glendale, and the San Gabriel Valley. In the 1930s, the league's footprint extended as far south as Fullerton.

In 2006, Burbank and Burroughs high schools in Burbank left the Foothill League to join the Pacific League to reduce travel expenses and become more competitive. Since then, the Foothill League has been composed exclusively of Hart District schools.
