= Central Park (Santa Clarita) =

Municipal park in Santa Clarita, California, United States

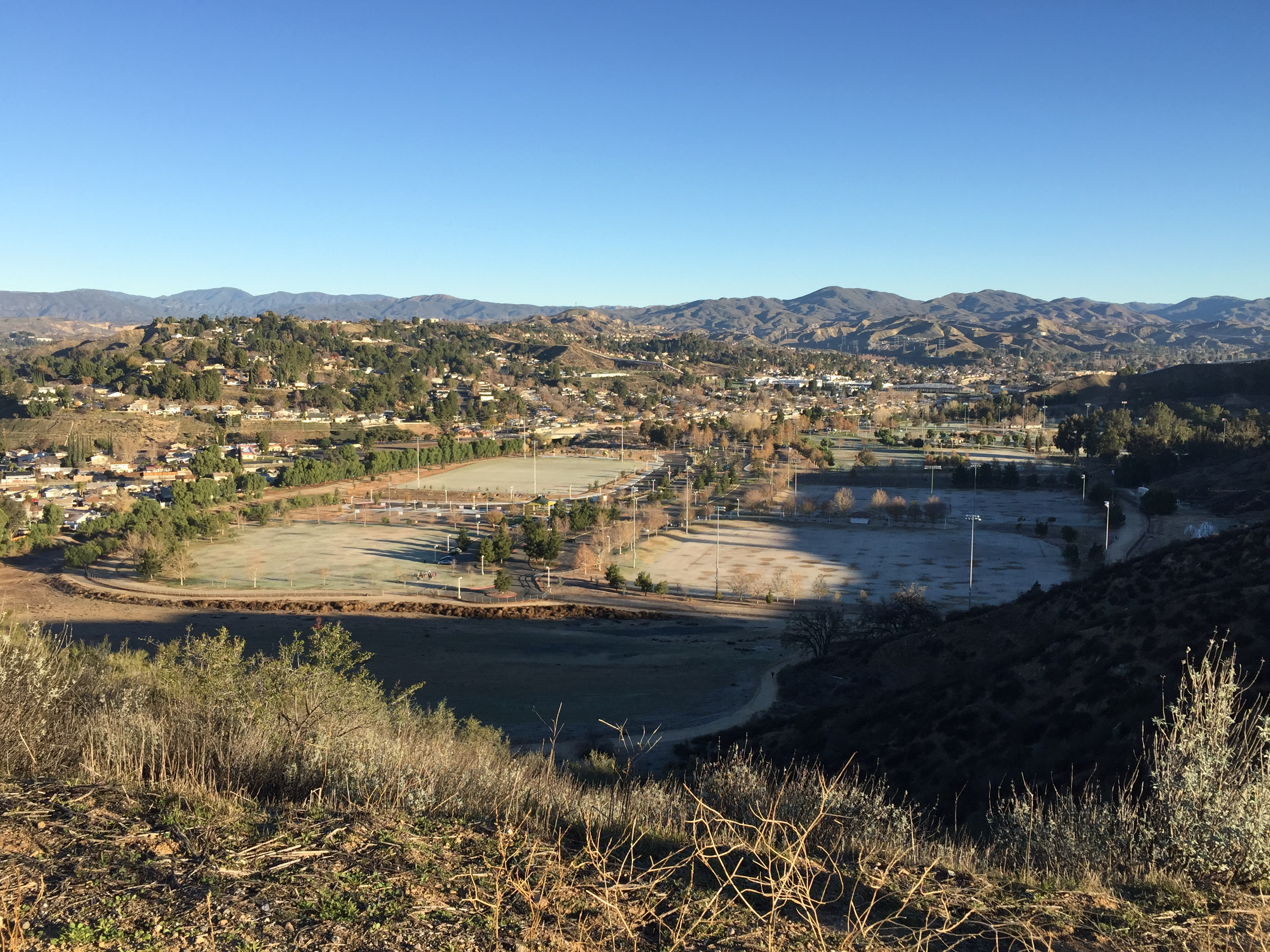
- Central Park, looking northeast toward Saugus High School

- Location within Santa Clarita
- Interactive map of Central Park
- Location: 27150 Bouquet Canyon Road; Santa Clarita, California 91350
- Coordinates: 34.433°N 118.521°W
- Area: 105 acres (42 ha)
- Operator: City of Santa Clarita

Central Park is a large municipal park located near the geographic center of Santa Clarita, California. The park was developed on 105 acres (42 ha) of land leased by the Santa Clarita Valley Water Agency to the City of Santa Clarita. It is accessible via Bouquet Canyon Road, which parallels Bouquet Creek along the northern edge of the park.

== Facilities ==
The park features a variety of recreational facilities, including four outdoor basketball courts, four baseball diamonds, several multipurpose fields, and a children's playground. In addition, the park features an extensive trail system linking the park with the surrounding highlands and the city's bikeway network.

=== Conservatory garden ===
Near the top of the Central Park hill lies the headquarters of the Santa Clarita Valley Water Agency, which include a Conservatory Garden and Learning Center with over 350 species of drought-resistant plants including flowers and grasses. The facility overlooks Newhall Ranch Road.

== Memorials ==
=== Youth Grove ===
The Santa Clarita Youth Grove is a memorial dedicated to local youth who were the victims of various traffic-related incidents. The memorial was built in 2005 and takes the form of a large plinth surrounded by over 50 canted wood pillars bearing the names of each victim. An annual "Evening of Remembrance" is held at the memorial to honor the victims and promote safe driving habits.

=== Saugus High School shooting ===
On February 18, 2021, the words "In Memoriam Gracie Muehlberger and Dominic Blackwell" were added to the sign at the entrance to the park to honor the victims of the 2019 Saugus High School shooting, following a decision by the Santa Clarita Water Board on December 15, 2020. Saugus High School is across Bouquet Canyon Road from Central Park.

== See also ==
- Placerita Canyon State Park
