= William S. Hart Union High School District =

School district in California, United States

Coordinates: 34.4104°N 118.5109°W

Address
- 21380 Centre Pointe Parkway Santa Clarita, California, 91350; United States
- Coordinates: 34.46917,-118.8904846

District information
- Type: Public
- Motto: One Hart: Every Student - Opportunity Ready
- Grades: 7–12
- Established: 1945; 81 years ago
- Superintendent: Michael Vierra
- NCES District ID: 0642510

Students and staff
- Students: 22,135 (2023–24)
- Teachers: 939.81 (2023–24)
- Staff: 2093.08 (2023–24)
- Student–teacher ratio: 23.6 (2023–24)
- Athletic conference: Foothill League

Other information
- Website: www.hartdistrict.org

The William S. Hart Union High School District (commonly referred to simply as the Hart District) is a school district in the Santa Clarita Valley of Los Angeles County, California. It serves all of the valley's public high school students (grades 9–12) and most of its junior high school students (grades 7–8). As of 2023–24, the total number of enrolled students (in 16 schools) was 22,135. The district's superintendent is Michael Vierra. The district is named after William S. Hart, one of the first western film stars, who lived in Newhall and was a local benefactor. The region served by the Hart District is also served by the Sulphur Springs, Saugus, Castaic, and Newhall elementary school districts.

== History ==
Prior to the establishment of William S. Hart High School in 1945, students in the Santa Clarita Valley continuing after elementary school would attend San Fernando High School in the Pacoima neighborhood of Los Angeles.

=== Enrollment decline ===
Between the 2015 and 2019, student enrollment within the Hart District declined 11.7% from an all-time high of 27,155 students during the 2015–16 academic year to 23,968 students during the 2019–2020 academic year. The COVID-19 pandemic continued this downward trend, with student enrollment declining a further 6.5% to 22,469 students during the 2022–23 academic year. During the 2023–24 academic year, the district's total student enrollment was 22,135, down 1.5% from the previous year. Despite a number of new housing developments being constructed throughout the Santa Clarita Valley, overall student enrollment is still expected to continue declining for the foreseeable future.

== High schools ==
Eight of the district's ten high schools are located within the city of Santa Clarita, with Castaic High School and West Ranch High School being located in the unincorporated communities of Castaic and Stevenson Ranch, respectively.

Jereann Bowman High School serves as the district's continuation high school. The Academy of the Canyons and Learning Post Academy offer students alternative education pathways.

Hart District high schools
| School | Address | Founded | Enrollment (2023–24) |
|---|---|---|---|
| Academy of the Canyons | 26455 Rockwell Canyon Road, Santa Clarita, CA 91355 | 2000 | 390 |
| Canyon High School | 19300 Nadal Street, Canyon Country, CA 91351 | 1968 | 1,966 |
| Castaic High School | 31575 Valley Creek Road, Castaic, CA 91384 | 2019 | 1,193 |
| Golden Valley High School | 27051 Robert C. Lee Parkway, Santa Clarita, CA 91350 | 2004 | 1,993 |
| Jereann Bowman High School | 21508 Centre Pointe Parkway, Santa Clarita, CA 91350 | 1969 | 307 |
| Learning Post Academy | 24825 Newhall Avenue, Santa Clarita, CA 91321 | 1980 | 363 |
| Saugus High School | 21900 Centurion Way, Santa Clarita, CA 91350 | 1975 | 2,295 |
| Valencia High School | 27801 Dickason Drive, Valencia, CA 91355 | 1994 | 2,258 |
| West Ranch High School | 26255 Valencia Boulevard, Stevenson Ranch, CA 91381 | 2004 | 1,843 |
| William S. Hart High School | 24825 Newhall Avenue, Santa Clarita, CA 91321 | 1945 | 1,930 |

== Junior high schools ==
Five of the district's six junior high schools are located within the city of Santa Clarita, with Rancho Pico Junior High being located in the Unincorporated community of Stevenson Ranch.

Hart District junior high schools
| School | Address | Founded | Enrollment (2023–24) | Feeds to |
|---|---|---|---|---|
| Arroyo Seco Junior High | 27171 Vista Delgado Drive, Santa Clarita, CA 91354 | 1974 | 1,240 | Saugus High |
| La Mesa Junior High | 26623 May Way, Santa Clarita, CA 91351 | 1995 | 1,023 | Golden Valley High |
| Placerita Junior High | 25015 Newhall Avenue, Santa Clarita, CA 91321 | 1961 | 888 | Hart High |
| Rancho Pico Junior High | 26250 Valencia Boulevard, Stevenson Ranch, CA 91381 | 2004 | 920 | West Ranch High |
| Rio Norte Junior High | 28771 Rio Norte Drive, Santa Clarita, CA 91354 | 2003 | 1,110 | Valencia High |
| Sierra Vista Junior High | 19425 Stillmore Street, Santa Clarita, CA 91351 | 1964 | 974 | Canyon High |

== Student demographics ==
As of the 2023–24 school year, 22,135 students were enrolled in Hart District schools. 45.4% of students were Hispanic or Latino, 32.2% were non-Hispanic white, 8.0% were Asian American, 5.1% were Filipino, 4.6% were multiracial, 4.3% were African American, 0.2% were Pacific Islander, and 0.1% were Indigenous American.

=== 2015–16 ===
During the 2015–16 school year, an all-time high of 27,155 students were enrolled in Hart District schools. 39.8% were non-Hispanic white, 39.6% of students were Hispanic or Latino, 6.0% were Asian American, 5.0% were African American, 4.7% were multiracial, 4.3% were Filipino, 0.2% were Indigenous American, and 0.1% were Pacific Islander.

== Feeder districts ==
- Castaic Union School District: serves Castaic, Val Verde, and a small portion of northwestern Valencia.
- Newhall School District: serves Stevenson Ranch, southern Valencia, and almost all of Newhall.
- Saugus Union School District: serves Saugus, northern Valencia, and western Canyon Country.
- Sulphur Springs School District: serves the majority of Canyon Country and part of northeastern Newhall.

The Castaic, Newhall, and Saugus Union school districts have offices in Valencia, while the Sulphur Springs School District's office is in Canyon Country. Castaic Union School District serves grades K–8; the other districts serve grades K–6.

== Governing board ==
Hart District governing board members are composed of five members, elected to a four-year term, by geographical district. The elections are held on a Tuesday after the first Monday in November of even numbered years.

The Hart District governing board is made of up; Dr. Aakash Ahuja representing Trustee Area 1, and is serving from 2024 to 2028; CPA Bob Jensen representing Trustee Area 2, serving from 2022 to 2026; Dr. Cherise G Moore representing Trustee Area 3, serving from 2022 to 2026; Erin Wilson representing Trustee Area 4, serving from 2024 to 2028; and Joe Messina for Trustee Area 5, serving from 2022 to 2026.
