= Castaic High School =

High school in Castaic, California, U.S.

Location
- 31575 Valley Creek Road; Castaic, California 91384; United States
- 34.4939°N 118.6535°W

Information
- Type: Public comprehensive high school
- Established: August 13, 2019; 6 years ago
- School district: William S. Hart Union High School District
- Principal: Ben Wobrock
- Grades: 9 - 12
- Enrollment: 1,193 (2023-24)
- Campus: Suburban
- Colors: Charcoal; White; Burnt orange
- Athletics conference: CIF Southern Section; Foothill League
- Nickname: Coyotes
- Newspaper: The Daily Howl
- Website: www.castaichighschool.org

Castaic High School (CHS or CSHS to avoid confusion with Canyon High School) is a high school in the unincorporated community of Castaic, California, in the Santa Clarita Valley. It is part of the William S. Hart Union High School District. The school officially opened on August 13, 2019.

== History ==
On March 28, 2018, the William S. Hart Union High School District named Melanie Hagman as the first principal of Castaic High School, its newest campus.

The district announced on October 10, 2018 that the school's new mascot would be the coyote and the colors would be charcoal gray, white, and texas orange. Input was solicited from community stakeholders, including students from Castaic Middle School who would attend CHS.

Castaic High School opened its doors on August 13, 2019, to a freshman class of 325 students. The school has a capacity of 2,600.

On July 18, 2022, Superintendent Mike Kuhlman announced that Vince Ferry, former principal of Rio Norte Junior High School and Saugus High School, would be taking over as principal.

On February 20, 2025, the Hart District announced that Ben Wobrock, former assistant principal of Rancho Pico Junior High School and West Ranch High School, would be taking over as principal, effective immediately.

== Academics ==
The Castaic High School campus hosts the iCAN Academy at Castaic High School, a middle college program operated by the Hart District in partnership with College of the Canyons (COC). The program consists of a rigorous curriculum that allows students to earn college credit all four years of high school. Unlike the district's other such program, Academy of the Canyons on the COC campus, iCAN students may participate in a full range of extracurricular activities including interscholastic athletics.

== Student demographics ==
As of the 2023-24 school year, 1,193 students were enrolled at Castaic High School. Of those, 44.4% were Hispanic, 37.7% were white, 4.7% were African American, 4.7% were Two or more races, 4.2% were Filipino, 3.7% were Asian, and 0.3% were American Indian or Alaska Native. As of 2020-21, 203 students (27.7%) were eligible for free or reduced-price lunch.

== Athletics ==
Castaic High School athletic teams are nicknamed the Coyotes. The school competes in the Foothill League with its fellow Hart District schools. The school fielded 17 teams in its first school year, all at the freshman level only.
