= Academy of the Canyons =

Public school in Santa Clarita, California, United States

Coordinates: 34.4050°N 118.5682°W

Location
- 26455 Rockwell Canyon Road; Santa Clarita, California 91355; United States

Information
- Type: Public
- Established: 2000
- School district: William S. Hart High School District
- Principal: Juliet Fine
- Grades: 9 to 12
- Enrollment: 390 (2023-2024)
- Colors: navy blue and maroon
- Slogan: Your Future Today
- Nickname: AOC
- Website: www.academyofthecanyons.com

Academy of the Canyons (AOC) is a public middle college high school in Santa Clarita, California, United States. The school, which enrolls students from 9th to 12th grade, is part of the William S. Hart High School District. It is located on the Valencia College of the Canyons campus, where students of AOC are concurrently enrolled. Students attending Academy of the Canyons take high school classes at the University Center and college courses at the College of the Canyons campus. During grades 9–12, students can earn up to 80 college units. A significant number of students at Academy of the Canyons have received one or more associate degrees by or before their high school graduation.

The school's motto/slogan is "Your Future Today". The symbol or mascot of the school is the Golden Oak Tree. Students often refer to themselves as "AOC Oak Trees" or "Acorns."

== Student demographics ==
As of the 2021–22 academic year, 395 students were enrolled at Academy of the Canyons. Of those students, 39.7% were Asian, 28.9% were non-Hispanic white, 21.5% were Hispanic or Latino, and 2.8% were African American. As of 2020–21, 59 students (14.3%) were eligible for free- or reduced-price lunch.
