= Golden Valley High School (Santa Clarita, California) =

High school in Santa Clarita, California, United States

Coordinates: 34.3997°N 118.4937°W

Location
- 27051 Robert C. Lee Parkway; Santa Clarita, California 91350; United States

Information
- Type: Public
- Established: 2004
- Status: Open
- School district: William S. Hart Union High School District
- NCES School ID: 064251010912
- Principal: Jennifer Ambrose
- Grades: 9–12
- Enrollment: 1,993 (2023-2024)
- Colors: Black and gold
- Athletics conference: CIF Southern Section; Foothill League
- Mascot: Graham the Grizzly
- Newspaper: The Grizzly Gazette
- Yearbook: The Growler
- Website: Golden Valley High School

Golden Valley High School is a school in the William S. Hart Union High School District in the Canyon Country neighborhood of Santa Clarita, California, United States. The school first opened in 2004 with a new campus, admitting freshmen and sophomores; the first class graduated in 2006.

== History ==
Golden Valley High School opened on August 16, 2004, as a new campus within the William S. Hart Union High School District, serving the Canyon Country neighborhood of Santa Clarita, California. The campus is located on Robert C. Lee Parkway, named for a former superintendent of the Hart Union High School District. Golden Valley High School was built with grants from the state of California's Financial Hardship Assistance program. After initially sitting dormant after construction, the school's theater was finished around 2010.

== Activities ==
=== Marching Band and Color Guard ===
The Golden Valley High School Grizzly Marching Band and Color Guard plays at home football games which are located at Canyon High School and they participate in SCSBOA competitions. They are continuously breaking records.

=== Choir ===
The school has four choirs, Show choir, Jazz choir, Concert choir, and Advanced concert choir".

=== Video production ===
In 2019, the school's GVTV (Golden Valley Television) won Best Daily Live Announcement Show on the West Coast from Student Television Network.

=== Junior Reserve Officers' Training Corps ===
The school is host to the Air Force Junior Reserve Officer Training Corps unit CA-20063.

== Athletics ==
Golden Valley started its athletics program when the school first opened in 2004.

In 2011, the boys' cross country team won the CIF Division II state championship and placed 11th at the Nike Cross Nationals in Portland, Oregon.

== Student demographics ==
As of the 2021-22 school year, 2,138 students were enrolled at Golden Valley High School. 60.1% of students were Hispanic, 16.4% were non-Hispanic white, 11.0% were Asian American, and 8.3% were African American. As of 2019-20, 1,058 students (49.3%) were eligible for free or reduced-price lunch.

== Notable alumni ==
- Maverick Ahanmisi (2009), basketball player
- Scott Barlow (2011), baseball player
- Leon Jacobs (2014), football player
- Blueface (2015), rapper
- Nikkita Lyons (2017), professional wrestler
- C. J. Ravenell (2018), NFL football defensive end for the Tennessee Titans
- ppcocaine (2019), rapper, singer, and songwriter
- Azaria Hill, bobsleder and 2026 Olympian
