= West Ranch High School =

Public high school in California, United States

Coordinates: 34.4037°N 118.5964°W

Location
- 26255 Valencia Boulevard; Stevenson Ranch, California 91381; United States

Information
- Type: Public
- Motto: "Relationships, Rigor, and Relevance."
- Established: 2004
- Principal: Robert Fisher
- Teaching staff: 72.18 (FTE)
- Grades: 9–12
- Enrollment: 1,777 (2024-2025)
- Student to teacher ratio: 24.62
- Color
- Athletics conference: CIF Southern Section; Foothill League
- Nickname: Wildcats
- Newspaper: The Paw Print
- Yearbook: "The Pride"
- Website: WRHS

West Ranch High School is a public high school in the William S. Hart Union High School District located in Stevenson Ranch, California. The school mascot is the Wildcat, and navy blue and gold are the school's official colors. The Paw Print is the school's official newspaper.

During its first year of operation (2004-2005 school year), the school was located on the campus of Rancho Pico Junior High School, housing only 9th grade students and faculty. Since the high school did not have a mascot at the time, the class of 2008 chose the wildcat to represent the school and because the movie High School Musical, which had come out 2 years prior to West Ranch’s first graduating class. It has since moved to its own campus, housing students 9th through 12th grade. The class of 2008 was the first graduating class in the history of the high school.

West Ranch High School has been the filming site for several television shows and movies, including The Unit and the movie Stay Cool.

The school houses Team 691, a FIRST Robotics Competition team.

== Student demographics ==
As of the 2021-22 academic year, 2,209 students were enrolled at West Ranch High School. 40.7% of students were non-Hispanic white, 26.1% were Asian American, 22.6% were Hispanic, and 3.9% were African American. As of 2020-21, 344 students (15.5%) were eligible for free or reduced-price lunch.

== Notable alumni ==
- Jake Bird (2014), pitcher for the New York Yankees
- R.J. Gordon (2020), pitcher in the New York Mets organization
- Walker Eget (2021), quarterback for the Duke Blue Devils
- Ryan Staub (2023), quarterback for the Tennessee Volunteers
