= Newhall, Santa Clarita, California =

Newhall
- Community of Santa Clarita
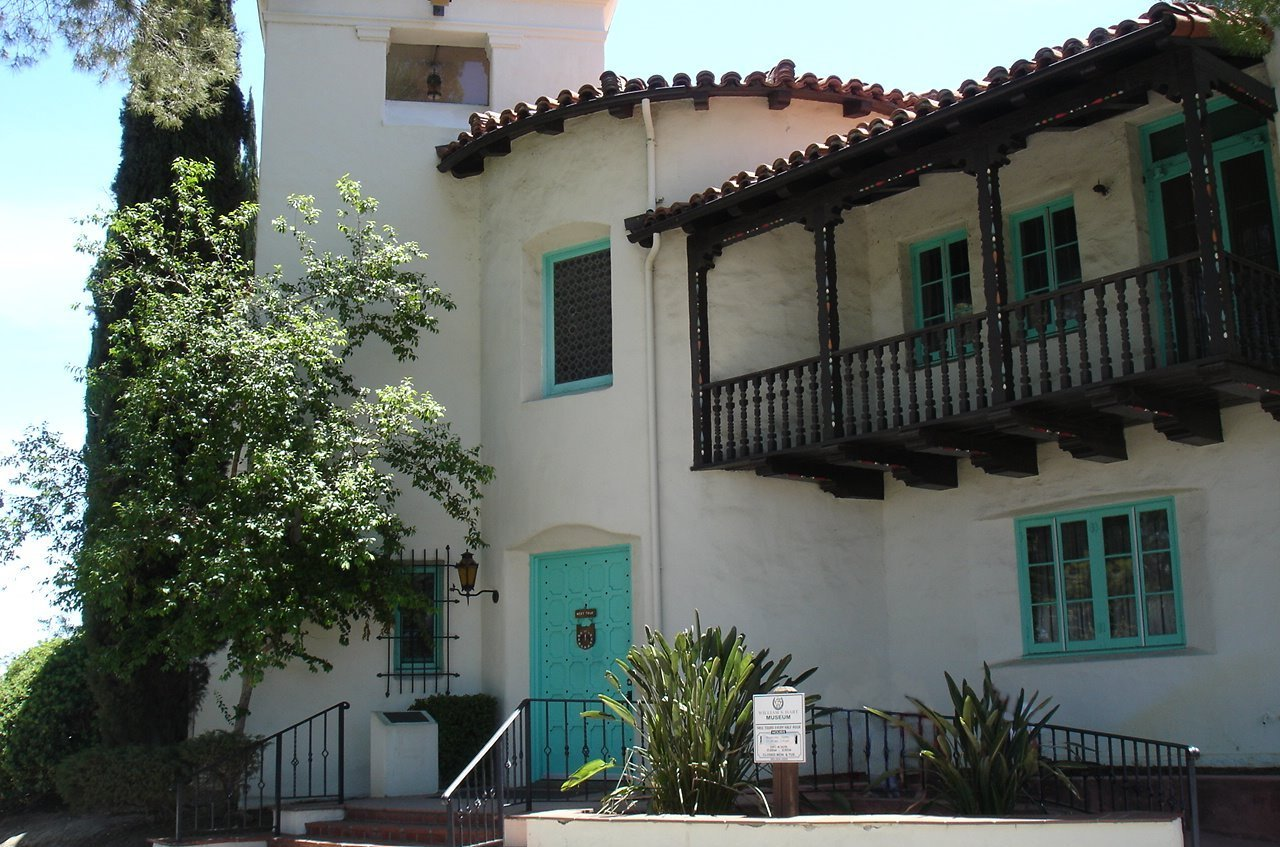
- William S. Hart Museum (La Loma de los Vientos)

- Position in Santa Clarita Valley Newhall (the Los Angeles metropolitan area) Newhall (California)
- Coordinates: 34.38°N 118.53°W
- Country: United States of America
- State: California
- County: Los Angeles
- City: Santa Clarita
- Elevation: 1,306 ft (398 m)
- Time zone: UTC-8 (Pacific (PST))
  - Summer (DST): UTC-7 (PDT)
- ZIP Code: 91321, 91355, 91381
- PO box: 91322
- Area code: 661
- GNIS feature ID: 272642

Newhall is the southernmost and oldest community in the city of Santa Clarita, California. Prior to the 1987 consolidation of Canyon Country, Saugus, Newhall, and Valencia into the city of Santa Clarita, it was an unincorporated area. It was the first permanent town in the Santa Clarita Valley.

== History ==
The Tataviam village of Tochonanga was located at the area where Newhall stands today. Fifty villagers were brought to Mission San Fernando from 1797 to 1811. Descendants of the village continued to live in the Newhall area.

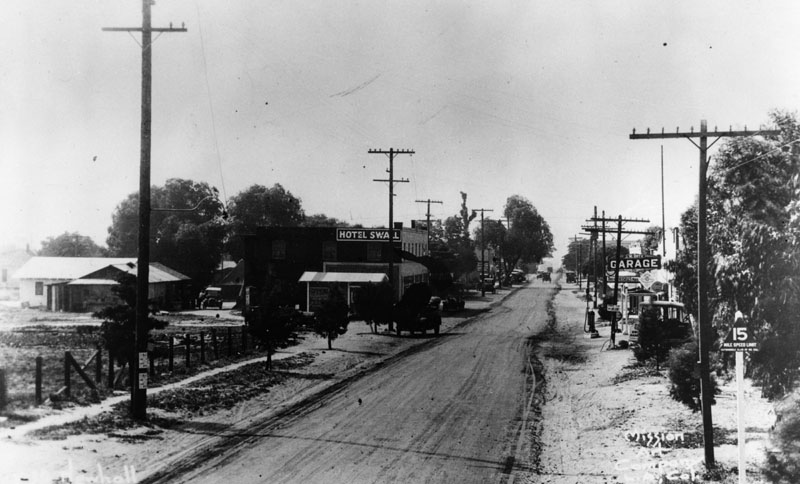
Street in Newhall, 1919, showing the Hotel Swall in the middle distance on the left side of the street, the later site of the Newhall Pharmacy

Named after businessman Henry Mayo Newhall, Newhall is home to the William S. Hart Regional Park, featuring tours of famous silent movie maker William S. Hart's mansion. Newhall is also home to the Pioneer Oil Refinery (California Historical Landmark, No. 172), the oldest surviving oil refinery in the world and the first commercially successful refinery in California. Over the years, Newhall has been the location for many movies, including Suddenly (1954) and Disney's The World's Greatest Athlete (1973). The TV series The Magnificent Seven was also for the most part filmed in Newhall.

The Lyons Station Stagecoach Stop was located at what is now Eternal Valley Cemetery near the intersection of Newhall Avenue and Sierra Highway in east Newhall.

On April 6, 1970, four California Highway Patrol officers were shot dead during a traffic stop of two heavily armed career criminals. The incident was known as the Newhall incident, although it took place in present-day Valencia. This led to increased emphasis on officer safety both within the CHP and nationwide.

== Education ==
The Master's University, a non-denominational Christian liberal arts university, is located in Newhall.

At the elementary school level, Newhall is almost entirely served by the Newhall School District, except for the far northeastern portion (bordering Canyon Country) which is served by the Sulphur Springs School District. At the middle and high school levels, Newhall is served by Placerita and La Mesa Junior High Schools, and Hart and Golden Valley High Schools, all part of the William S. Hart Union High School District.

== Old Town Newhall ==
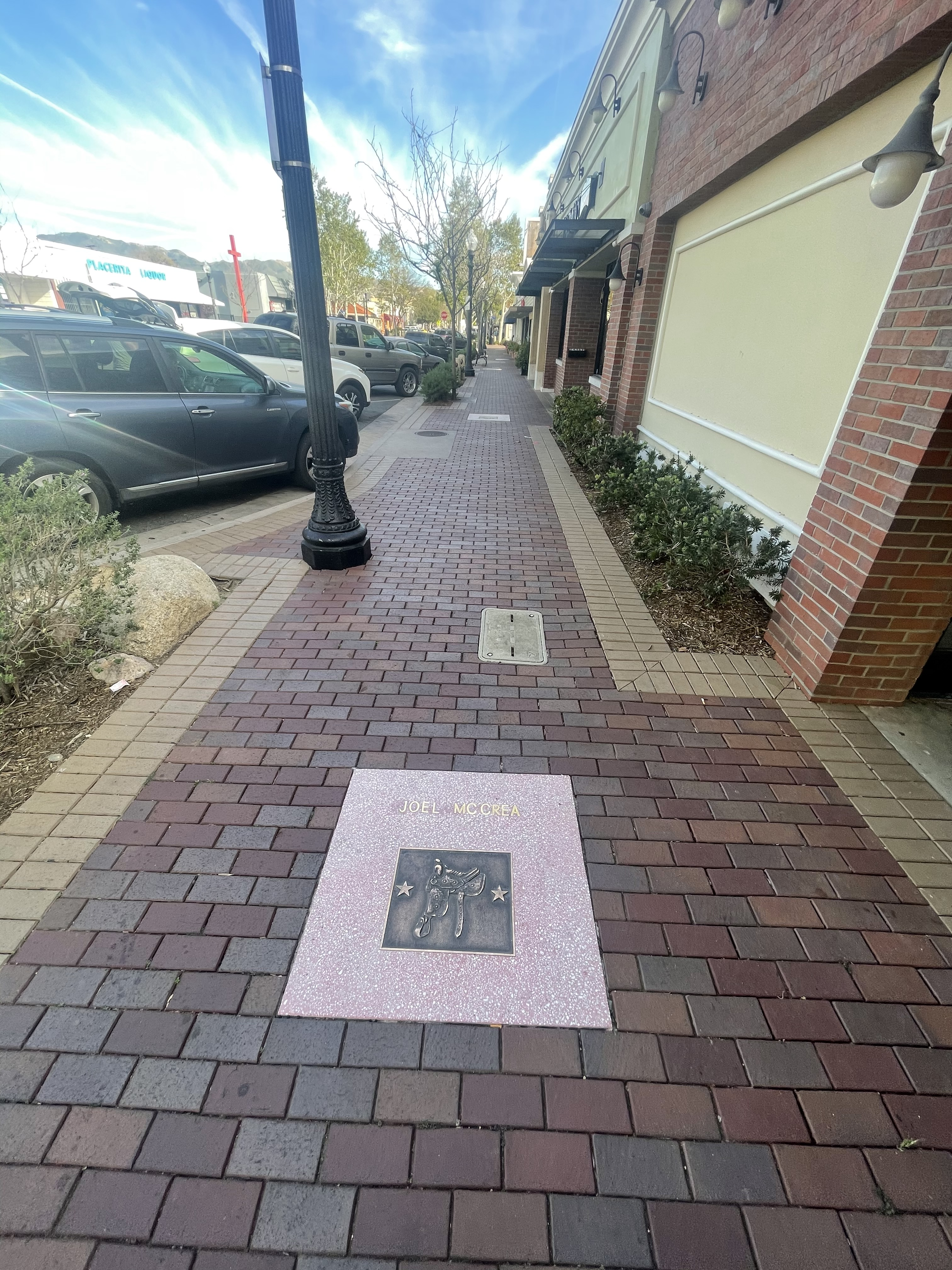
Walk of Western Stars

The historic district of Old Town Newhall (a.k.a. Downtown Newhall) is a major cultural and business center. It contains many independent restaurants, stores, and theaters, as well as a public library. The areas surrounding Old Town Newhall are predominantly Hispanic, and there are many Mexican restaurants. The Old Town Newhall Farmers Market is located on the grounds of the public library. Other notable sites in the area include the William S. Hart Park; Newhall DMV; Newhall Elementary School (part of the Newhall School District); Newhall Metrolink station; Veterans Historical Plaza; First Presbyterian Church of Newhall; Unity Center mosque; Newhall Community Center; and the historic Saugus Train Station (Heritage Junction). The Walk of Western Stars is also a popular attraction. The official Old Town Newhall website describes it as "Santa Clarita's premier arts and entertainment district." The Hart and Main wedding and event venue is scheduled to open in spring 2022. Some of the recent developments in Old Town Newhall have been described as gentrification.

== Climate ==
This region experiences hot and dry summers, along with mild, rainy winters. According to the Köppen Climate Classification system, Newhall has a warm-summer Mediterranean climate, abbreviated "Csa" on climate maps.

Climate data for Newhall, California (1989-1997 averages)
Month	Jan	Feb	Mar	Apr	May	Jun	Jul	Aug	Sep	Oct	Nov	Dec	Year
Mean daily maximum °F (°C)	61.6 (16.4)	65.2 (18.4)	69.5 (20.8)	76.5 (24.7)	79.2 (26.2)	88.1 (31.2)	92.2 (33.4)	92.2 (33.4)	89.4 (31.9)	79.4 (26.3)	69.7 (20.9)	62.0 (16.7)	77.1 (25.0)
Mean daily minimum °F (°C)	40.3 (4.6)	42.7 (5.9)	43.8 (6.6)	47.9 (8.8)	51.0 (10.6)	56.1 (13.4)	59.7 (15.4)	59.3 (15.2)	57.0 (13.9)	51.0 (10.6)	44.6 (7.0)	40.0 (4.4)	49.4 (9.7)
Average precipitation inches (mm)	5.67 (144)	5.20 (132)	3.94 (100)	0.27 (6.9)	0.21 (5.3)	0.11 (2.8)	0.02 (0.51)	0.00 (0.00)	0.06 (1.5)	0.46 (12)	0.39 (9.9)	1.85 (47)	18.18 (461.91)
Average snowfall inches (cm)	0.0 (0.0)	0.1 (0.25)	0.0 (0.0)	0.0 (0.0)	0.0 (0.0)	0.0 (0.0)	0.0 (0.0)	0.0 (0.0)	0.0 (0.0)	0.0 (0.0)	0.0 (0.0)	0.0 (0.0)	0.1 (0.25)
Source: "Western Regional Climate Center".

== Notable people ==
- Gene Autry, singing cowboy actor
- Jake Bird (born 1995), Major League Baseball pitcher for the Washington Nationals
- Trevor Brown, former Major League Baseball catcher
- Tyler Glasnow, Major League Baseball pitcher for the Los Angeles Dodgers
- William S. Hart, silent film star
- Andrew Lorraine, former Major League Baseball pitcher
- Eddie Mekka, actor
- James Shields, former Major League Baseball pitcher
- Brady White, college football quarterback
