= William S. Hart High School =

Hart High School

Location
- 24825 Newhall Avenue; Santa Clarita, California 91321; United States; 34.3845°N 118.5378°W

Information
- Type: Public high school
- Motto: Alive with Pride
- Established: 1945
- School district: William S. Hart Union High School District
- Principal: John Turner
- Teaching staff: 86.83 (FTE)
- Grades: 9–12
- Enrollment: 1,930 (2023–2024)
- Student to teacher ratio: 22.23
- Colors: Red; Black; White
- Athletics conference: CIF Southern Section; Foothill League
- Nickname: Hawks
- Newspaper: The Smoke Signal
- Yearbook: The Tomahawk
- Website: www.harthighschool.org

William S. Hart High School is a four-year public high school in the Newhall neighborhood in the city of Santa Clarita, California, United States. Founded in 1945, it is the oldest high school in the Santa Clarita Valley. Named for local Western actor William S. Hart, it is part of the William S. Hart Union High School District.

== Student demographics ==
As of the 2021-22 academic year, 2,146 students were enrolled at Hart High School. 57.3% of students were Hispanic, 32.0% were non-Hispanic white, 5.6% were Asian American, and 1.3% were African American. As of 2020-21, 844 students (39.2%) were eligible for free or reduced-price lunch.

== Activities ==
Hart High School was formerly the host of the Hart Invitational Quiz Bowl, a quiz bowl competition for teams from Los Angeles, Orange, Riverside, and San Bernardino counties. Lori Huenink coached the quiz bowl team for 21 years from 1974 to 1995. The school was also the scene of filming of the 1982 made for television anti-drug abuse movie Desperate Lives starring Diana Scarwid and guest starring Dr. Joyce Brothers using its then current students and administration.

== Mascot controversy ==
Hart High School's mascot had been an Indian since the school's foundation in 1945, until June 2020, when students urged principal Jason d'Autremont to discontinue the mascot, which they characterized as outdated and offensive. An online petition to change the mascot gathered thousands of signatures. D'Autremont, with help from the Santa Clarita City Council, acted on these complaints.

In a student survey conducted on March 12, 2021, 49% of students favored keeping the mascot, 26% favored changing it, and 25% had no preference. On July 14, 2021, the board of the William S. Hart Union High School District voted 4-1 to retire the mascot by 2025. On March 19, 2024, after an election amongst staff and students, it was decided that the new mascot would be the Hawks, starting with the 2024-25 school year.

== Notable alumni ==
- Trevor Bauer, MLB Cy Young Award winning pitcher
- Kyle Boller, NFL quarterback, Baltimore Ravens 2003–2007, St. Louis Rams 2009, Oakland Raiders 2010–11, signed by San Diego Chargers in 2012, retired; married to former Miss California Carrie Prejean
- Steve Borden, professional wrestler Sting
- Trevor Brown, MLB catcher, San Francisco Giants
- Laura Diaz, KTTV journalist
- Anthony Ervin, 4-time Olympic gold medalist swimmer and 2-time world champion
- Tyler Glasnow, MLB pitcher, Los Angeles Dodgers
- Mark-Paul Gosselaar, actor on Saved by the Bell and NYPD Blue
- Delano Howell, NFL strong safety, Buffalo Bills 2012, Indianapolis Colts 2013–14
- Darryl Ingram, NFL tight end for Minnesota Vikings, Cleveland Browns, and Green Bay Packers
- Trenton Irwin, NFL wide receiver, Miami Dolphins 2019, Cincinnati Bengals 2019–24
- Joe Kapp, NFL and CFL quarterback, led Minnesota Vikings to Super Bowl IV
- Gary Lockwood, actor, played astronaut Frank Poole in 2001: A Space Odyssey
- Andrew Lorraine, MLB pitcher
- Kevin Millar, professional baseball first baseman, analyst for MLB Network and New England Sports Network
- Mike Montgomery, MLB pitcher for 2016 World Series champion Chicago Cubs
- Matt Moore, NFL quarterback for Miami Dolphins and backup quarterback for Kansas City Chiefs in Super Bowl LIV
- Dee Dee Myers, political analyst, press secretary to President Bill Clinton (January 1993 – December 1994), consultant on The West Wing
- Micah Ohlman, KTLA News Anchor
- Jerry Owens, MLB outfielder for Chicago White Sox, wide receiver for UCLA
- Tyler Posey, actor on MTV's Teen Wolf
- Kyle Reynish, professional soccer player for the Chicago Fire
- Cole Roederer, 2018 2nd Round Draft Pick by the Chicago Cubs
- James Shields, MLB starting pitcher for Chicago White Sox, formerly of San Diego Padres (2014–2016), Kansas City Royals (2013–14) and Tampa Bay Rays (2006–2012)
- Juliet Sorci, actress in the TV movie A Mom for Christmas
- Chris Valaika, MLB infielder, Cincinnati Reds 2010–2012, Miami Marlins 2013, Chicago Cubs 2014; coach
- Pat Valaika, MLB infielder, Baltimore Orioles
- Derek Waldeck, professional soccer player for the Spokane Velocity
- Bob Walk, former MLB pitcher, nicknamed "The Whirly Bird", Philadelphia Phillies 1980, Atlanta Braves 1981–1983, and Pittsburgh Pirates 1984–1993
- Brady White, quarterback who played college football for the Memphis Tigers
- Todd Zeile, former MLB infielder for St. Louis Cardinals, Los Angeles Dodgers and other teams

== Notable faculty ==
Film composer Paul Hertzog formerly worked at Hart as the AP Music Theory teacher. Hertzog also taught 10th-grade Honors English.
