= Magic Mountain (California) =

Mountain in California, United States

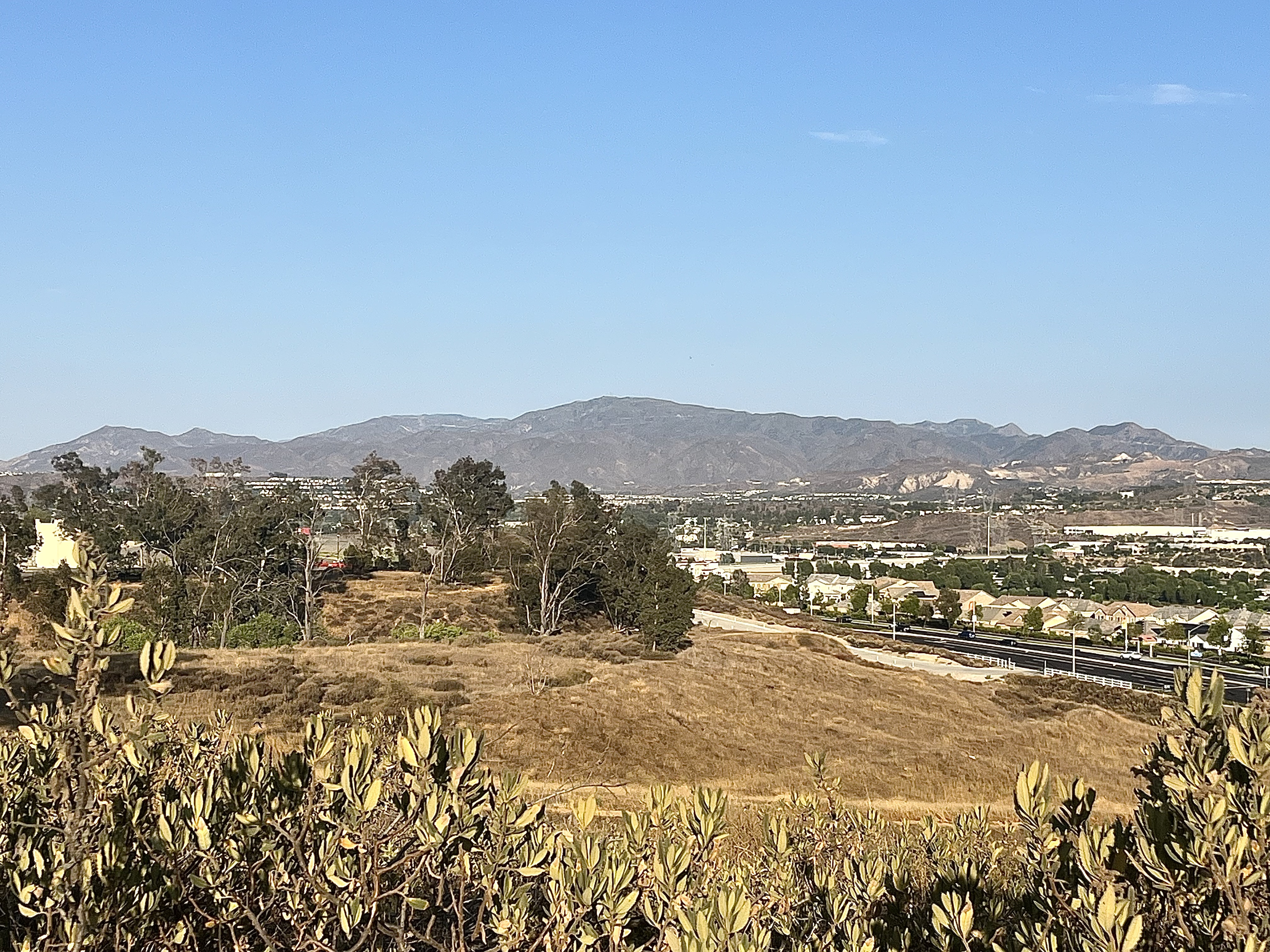
- Magic Mountain as viewed from Central Park in Santa Clarita, California.

Highest point
- Elevation: 4,864 ft (1,483 m)
- Prominence: 549 feet (168 m)
- Isolation: 3.02 miles (4.87 km)
- Coordinates: 34°23′12″N 118°19′47″W

Geography
- Location within the Los Angeles metropolitan area Location within California Location within the United States
- Parent range: San Gabriel Mountains
- Topo map: USGS Agua Dulce

Climbing
- Easiest route: Forest Route 3N17 from Bear Divide, Class 1

Magic Mountain is a mountain in the western San Gabriel Mountains in Los Angeles County, California, at the eastern edge of the Santa Clarita Valley. It can be seen to the east of Canyon Country, to the southeast of Soledad Canyon, and to the south of Agua Dulce. It is in both the San Gabriel Mountains National Monument and the Angeles National Forest. A U.S. Wilderness area of the same name was established in 2009 on its north slopes. The mountain is also the namesake of Six Flags Magic Mountain in Santa Clarita.

In the mid-20th century, the mountain hosted integrated fire control facilities related to Project Nike as part of the Los Angeles Nike Missile Ring, bearing the name LA-98-C, with the missile launch station located at the base of the mountain in Soledad Canyon next to the Lang Southern Pacific Station. After the station's closure, the infrastructure on the peak was later reused as a rocket fuel laboratory by the Marquardt Corporation for a number of space exploration projects, including the Apollo program.

== History ==
=== Name and early history ===
The area around Magic Mountain is part of the ancestral territory of the Tataviam people, who made several footpaths in the region south of the peak which were used for hunting and gathering. The Tataviam still consider the region important, and it is possible that the name "Magic Mountain" is of Tataviam origin.

Magic Mountain was originally known as Iron Mountain on the United States Geological Survey topographic maps, first appearing in the year 1900. The name Magic Mountain first appeared on these maps in 1939. Six Flags Magic Mountain, an amusement park in nearby Valencia, is named after the mountain.

=== Nike missile site (1955–1963) ===
In 1955, Magic Mountain was selected by Project Nike to be an Integrated Fire Control (IFC) targeting site for Nike Ajax missiles as part of the Los Angeles Defense Area. The land surrounding the mountain was acquired by the Army Corps of Engineers from the US Forest Service following the signing of a special use permit on October 17, 1955. Construction included the improvement of the access road to the peak from Bear Divide, installation of water infrastructure, and construction of a transmission line. These projects, along with the IFC technology itself, were completed by the end of 1956 and the base was given the designation LA-98-C. The missile launch site itself was constructed in Lang, just east of Canyon Country.

Army housing for the families of soldiers stationed at Magic Mountain (as well as nearby Los Pinetos) was completed in Sand Canyon in 1959. The site atop Magic Mountain was operational from 1957 until 1961, when the missile launch site at Lang was upgraded to use Nike Hercules missiles but control was transferred to another nearby IFC site. Both sites were considered for addition to the National Register of Historic Places, but the degradation of the sites led to them being passed over.

=== Marquardt Corporation laboratory (1964–1970) ===
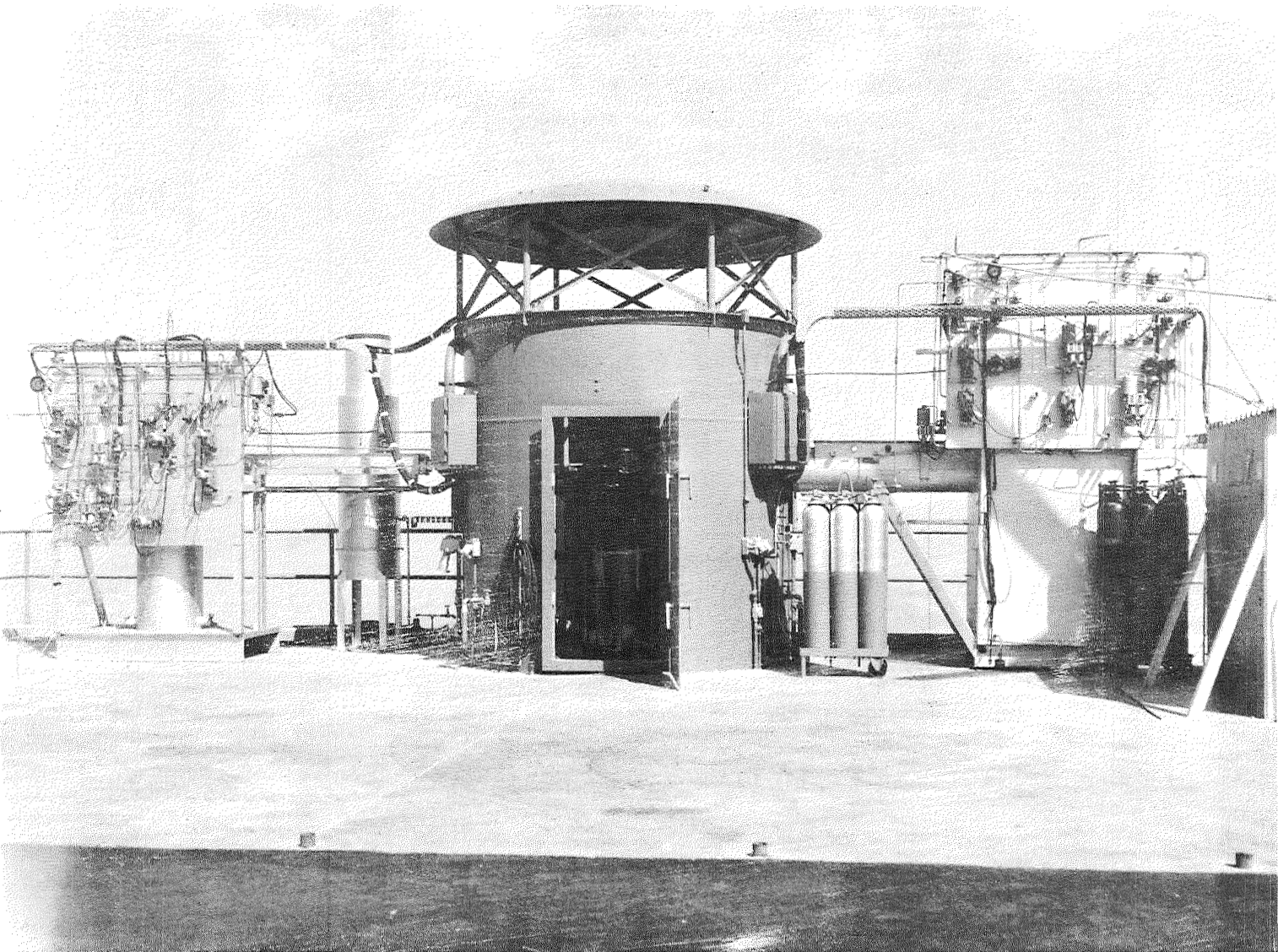
A test cell located at the Marquardt laboratory, seen no later than June 1969.

The former IFC site was transferred back to the US Forest Service after 1962, before being leased out to the Marquardt Corporation, who constructed their Rocket Test Laboratory on the peak. They chose this site to test "highly reactive or toxic propellants" at a safe distance from the populated areas their existing test sites were located in, such as Saugus and Van Nuys. The lab was dedicated on October 30, 1964. While in operation, various tests were conducted at the site as part of the Apollo program.

In December 1967, three residents of the San Fernando Valley died in a plane crash on the mountainside.

=== Recent history (1970–present) ===
In the 1980s, Phil Gillibrand of the P.W. Gillibrand Company made plans to strip mine ilmenite and magnetite at multiple sites in what would later become the Magic Mountain Wilderness between the peak and Soledad Canyon. These plans were approved in 1991 but never materialized.

Following the closure of the Marquardt lab, management of the peak was once again returned to the Forest Service. The Magic Mountain Wilderness area and the San Gabriel Mountains National Monument were established in 2009 and 2014, respectively.

The region has been affected by a number of wildfires. In 2009, the Magic Mountain Wilderness was closed following the Station Fire and did not reopen until May 2010. In January 2025, an evacuation was ordered for the area around the mountain due to the nearby Lidia Fire.

== Geography ==
Magic Mountain is located in the western San Gabriel Mountains, as well as the Angeles National Forest and the San Gabriel Mountains National Monument. It is one of the mountains that borders the Santa Clarita Valley, located to the east of Canyon Country, southeast of Soledad and Sand Canyons, and south of nearby Agua Dulce. The most common ascent route starts at Bear Divide, a mountain pass between Canyon Country and the San Fernando Valley, and follows Forest Service Road 3N17. This road was first paved by the United States Army Corps of Engineers as part of the construction of the Nike station. Route 3N17 is currently closed to motor vehicles indefinitely due to unstable conditions, but remains passable to non-motorized transportation such as hikers or mountain bikers. Although there are a number of alternative routes to the top that traverse the wilderness area, these are mostly either abandoned roads or visitor-made social trails.

Magic Mountain is one of the windiest areas in Los Angeles County. In 2023, the Los Angeles National Weather Service Forecast Office reported wind gusts of over 100 miles per hour (161 km/h) at the Magic Mountain Truck Trail wind monitoring station located on the peak on two occasions, both during Santa Ana wind events. In 2025, the same NWS station reported wind gusts of 86 miles per hour (138 km/h) leading up to the January 2025 Southern California wildfires.

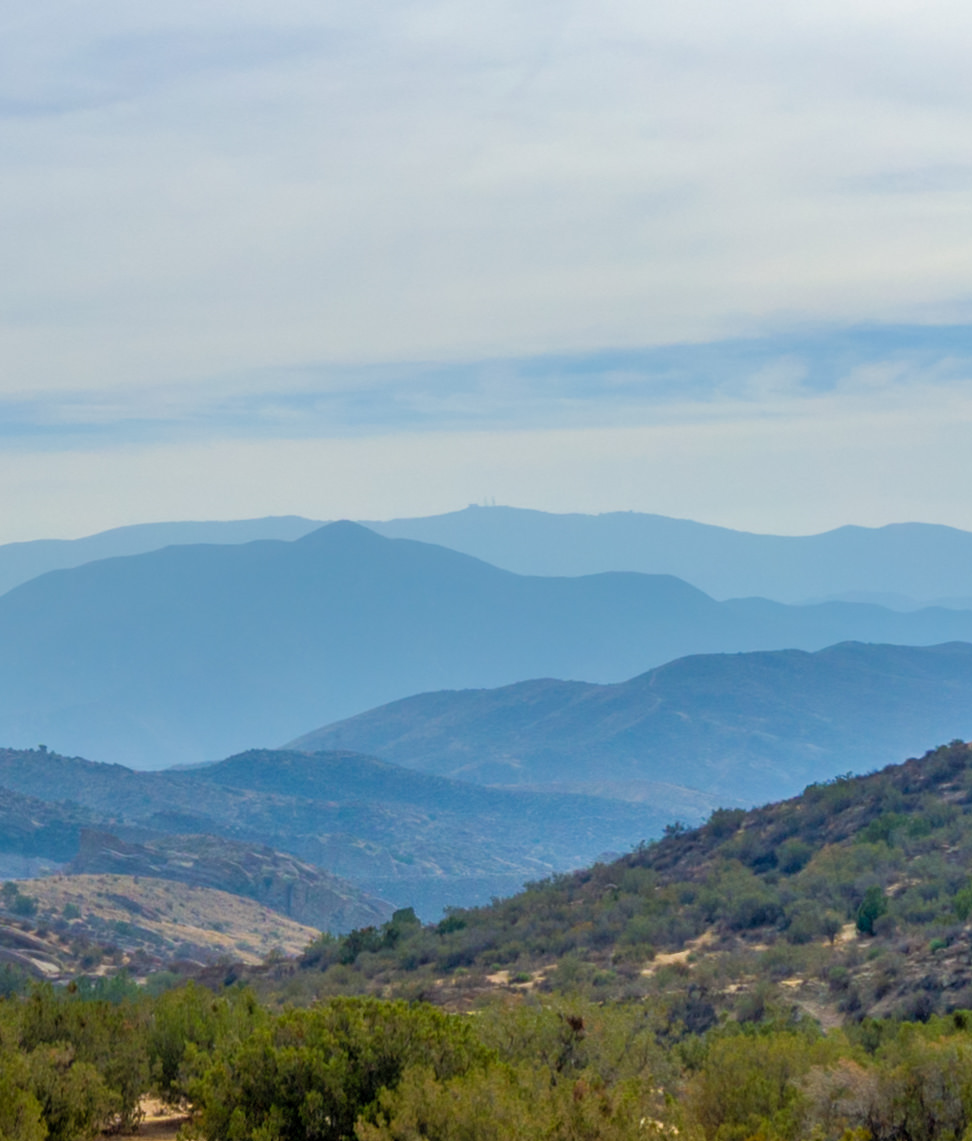
Magic Mountain viewed in the distance from Vasquez Rocks Natural Area Park in Agua Dulce, California.

== Magic Mountain Wilderness ==
Two regions comprising 12,282 acres (49.7 square kilometers) of undisturbed land on the north slopes of the mountain, separated by an abandoned road, were designated as the Magic Mountain Wilderness on March 30, 2009 as part of the Omnibus Public Land Management Act of 2009. U.S. Representative Buck McKeon of California's 25th congressional district and U.S. Senator Barbara Boxer led a last-minute bipartisan effort to add the mountain to the bill, which protected over 700,000 acres of land in California. The declaration of a wilderness area on Magic Mountain was first advocated for by the Sierra Club in early 2001 as part of the California Wild Heritage Campaign. Boxer introduced related legislation in the Senate as early as May 2002, while an identical House bill was introduced one month later by Representative Hilda Solis of California's 31st congressional district.

In a press conference following the passage of the bill by Congress, McKeon described the land around Magic Mountain as "some of the most magnificent in California and the country." The declaration of a wilderness area on Magic Mountain was championed by Dianne Erskine-Hellrigel, the leader of a local Santa Clarita hiking club, as well as the Sierra Club. Erskine-Hellrigel, who wrote an environmental report on the region prior to its designation as a national wilderness, described Magic Mountain as "one of the most beautiful natural areas around Santa Clarita." The wilderness area's designation was also praised by the City of Santa Clarita, The Wilderness Society, and the Fernandeño Tataviam Band of Mission Indians.

The Magic Mountain Wilderness has a number of unique flora and fauna, owing to its mixture of chaparral and coniferous forests. Local scrubland flora include chamise, manzanita, scrub oak, and ceanothus, while the more wooded areas feature oaks, willows, alders, and sycamores. Local endangered fauna include the California condor, the least Bell's vireo, the southwestern willow flycatcher, the arroyo toad, and the mountain yellow-legged frog. The mountain is considered to be a good place to spot California condors.

The peak itself is excluded from the wilderness area due to the developments made by Project Nike and Marquardt, as is the abandoned road on the north side of the mountain which divides the wilderness in two.
