= Placerita Canyon State Park =

State park in Los Angeles County, California, United States

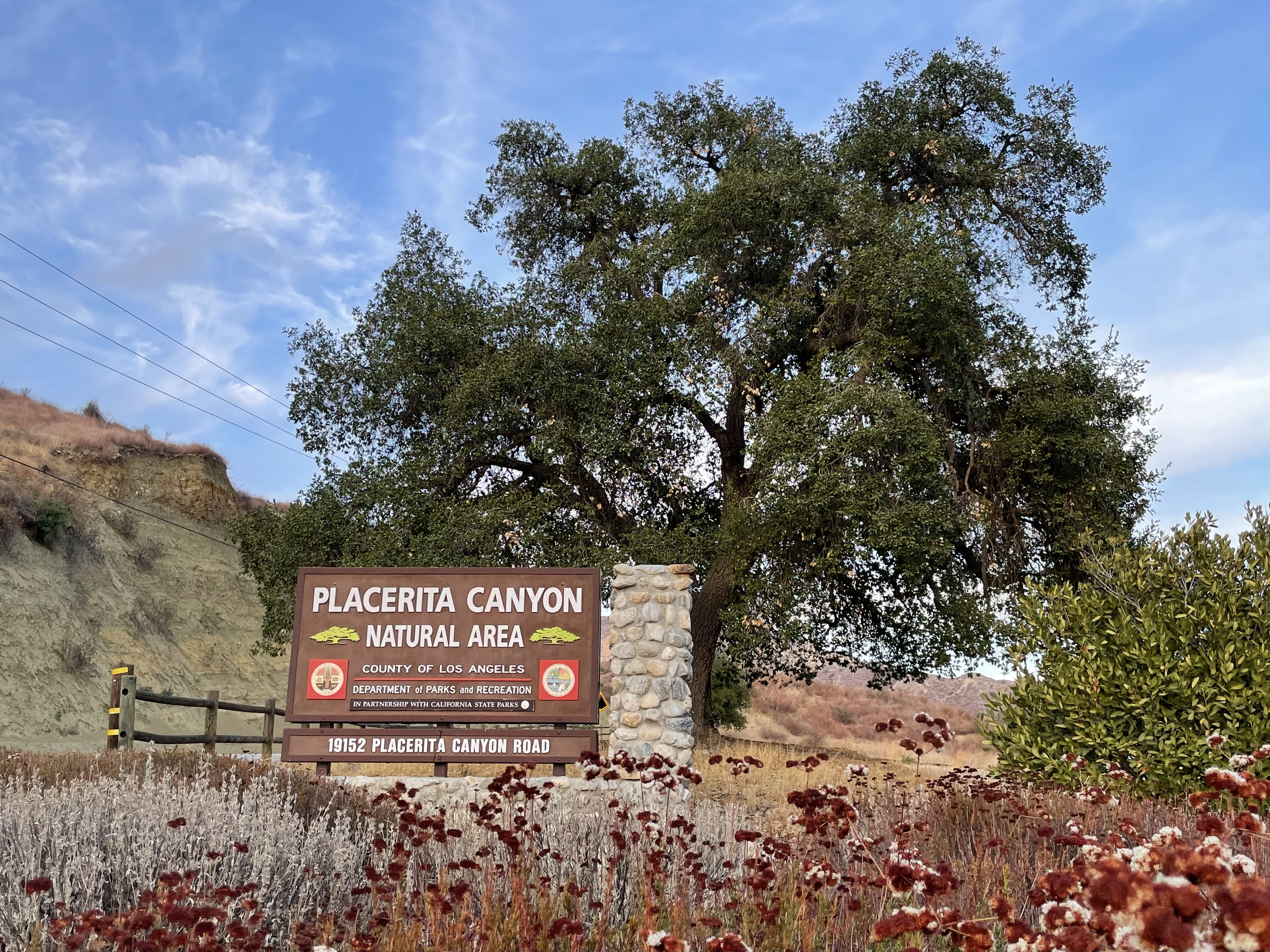
- Welcome sign of Placerita Canyon State Park

- Location within Santa Clarita Location within California Location within the United States
- Location: 19152 Placerita Canyon Road; Newhall, California 91321; United States
- Coordinates: 34°22′33″N 118°26′45″W
- Established: 1950
- Governing body: California Department of Parks and Recreation

Placerita Canyon State Park is a California State Park located on the north slope of the western San Gabriel Mountains, in an unincorporated rural area of Los Angeles County, near the city of Santa Clarita. The park hosts a variety of historic and natural sites, as well as serving as a trailhead for several hiking trails leading into the San Gabriel Mountains.

== Cultural history ==
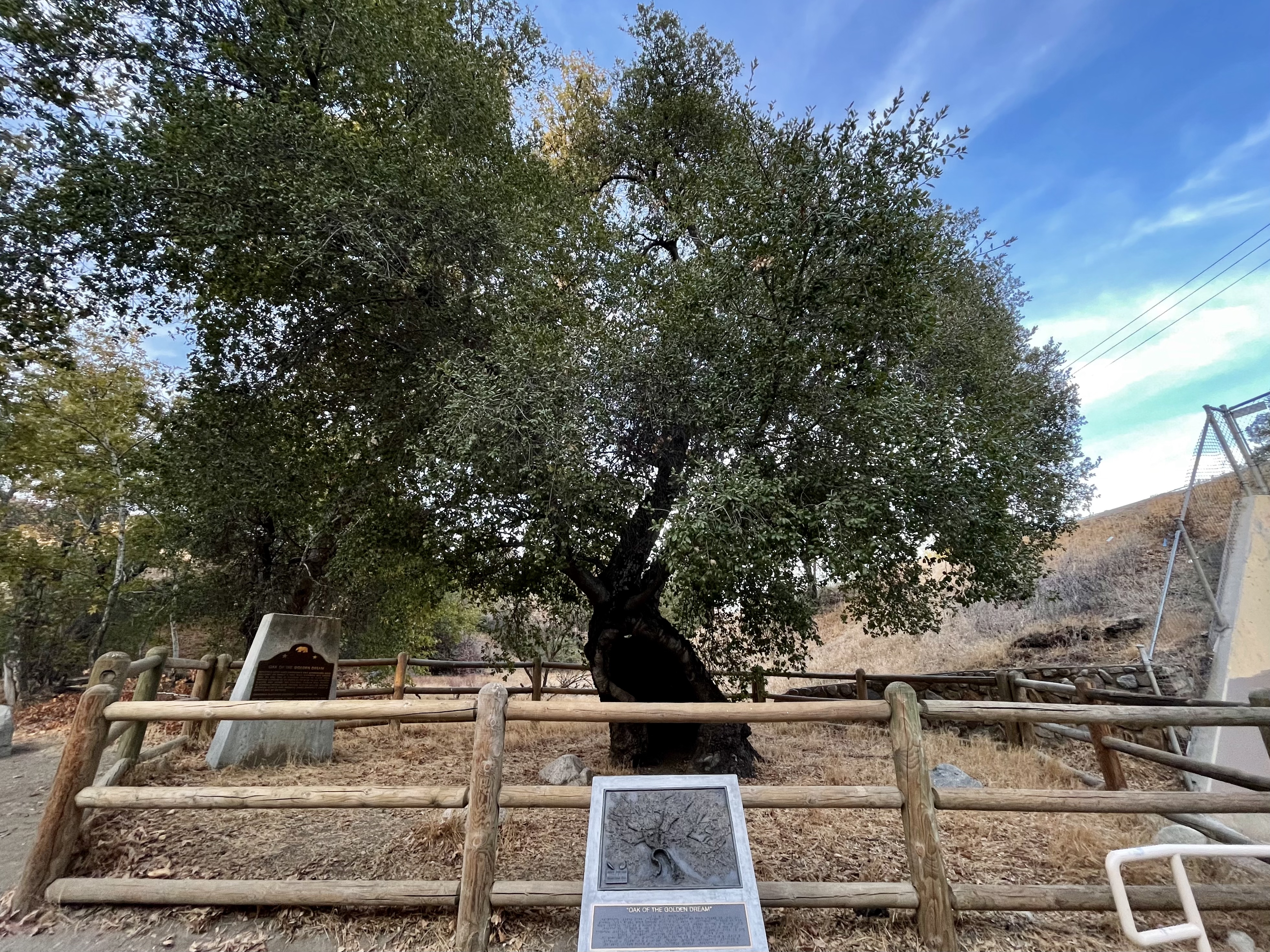
Oak of the Golden Dream, 2021

The area of Placerita Canyon, in addition to the Santa Clarita Valley and the surrounding mountains, have been inhabited by the native Tataviam since time immemorial.

In 1842, the region was annexed under Rancho San Francisco, part of the larger Mexican land grant system that was dissolved 8 years later with California statehood inside the United States. The park preserves the site of the first documented discovery of gold in California where in 1842, Francisco Lopez found gold flakes on wild onion roots under the "Oak of the Golden Dream".

In 1900, oil was discovered within the valley.

The park is near several movie ranches, all historic and active, including the Monogram Movie Ranch—Melody Ranch and the Disney—Golden Oak Ranch.

- The "Oak of the Golden Dream" is California Historical Landmark #168.

== Geography ==
Placerita Canyon State Park is located along Placerita Creek in the southeastern Santa Clarita Valley, just outside the city limits of Santa Clarita but within its sphere of influence. It lies between the Santa Clarita neighborhoods of Newhall and Sand Canyon.

The park, under the name Placerita Canyon Natural Area, is currently managed by the Los Angeles County Department of Parks and Recreation. The Placerita Canyon Nature Center is the park's visitor center and museum. The park also contains the Walker Cabin (a restored and furnished 1920s cabin of the Walker family), and hiking and nature trails.

=== Geology ===
The park is also notable for a seepage of 'white' oil - unknown anywhere else in the world. This late 19th century discovery of oil surprised the prospectors because it is naturally filtered so that it is not black but transparent. A small pool of it continues to be active by the trailside leading up from the Nature Center to the Walker Ranch.

== Ecology ==
Located in the transition zone between the San Gabriel Mountains' California montane chaparral and woodlands ecoregion, and the Mojave's Deserts and xeric shrublands Biome in the California Floristic Province, the Placerita Canyon Flora is complex. Placerita Canyon State Park is in the east-west trending Placerita Canyon on the Placerita Fault and contains sandstone and metamorphic formations, and seasonal streams. Chaparral and Coast Live Oak woodland plant communities are represented.

Riparian woodlands at the park include three species of native trees including arroyo willow, cottonwood, and native California sycamore.

== Gallery ==
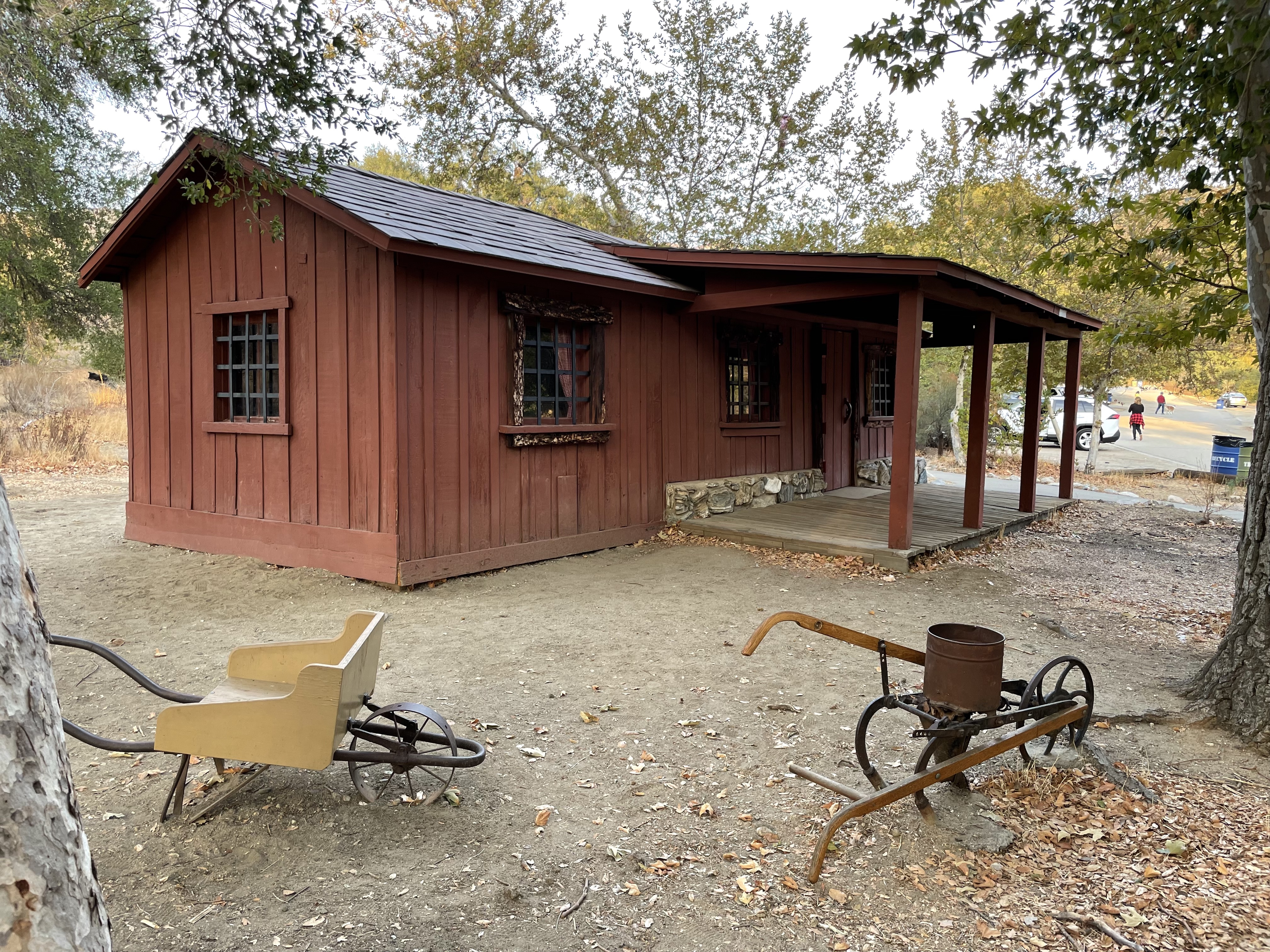
The restored Walker Cabin

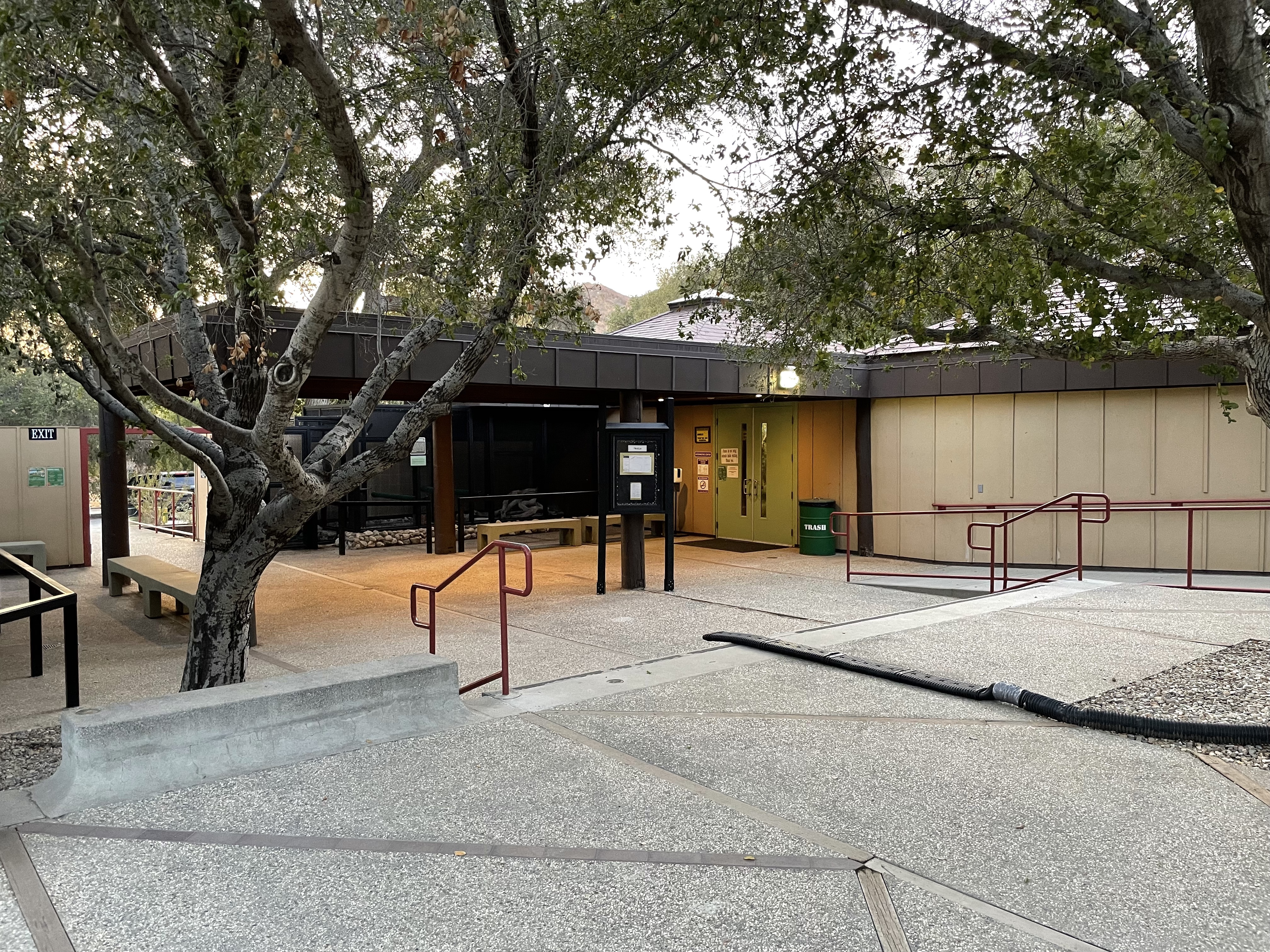
Exterior of the nature center, featuring live animal exhibits

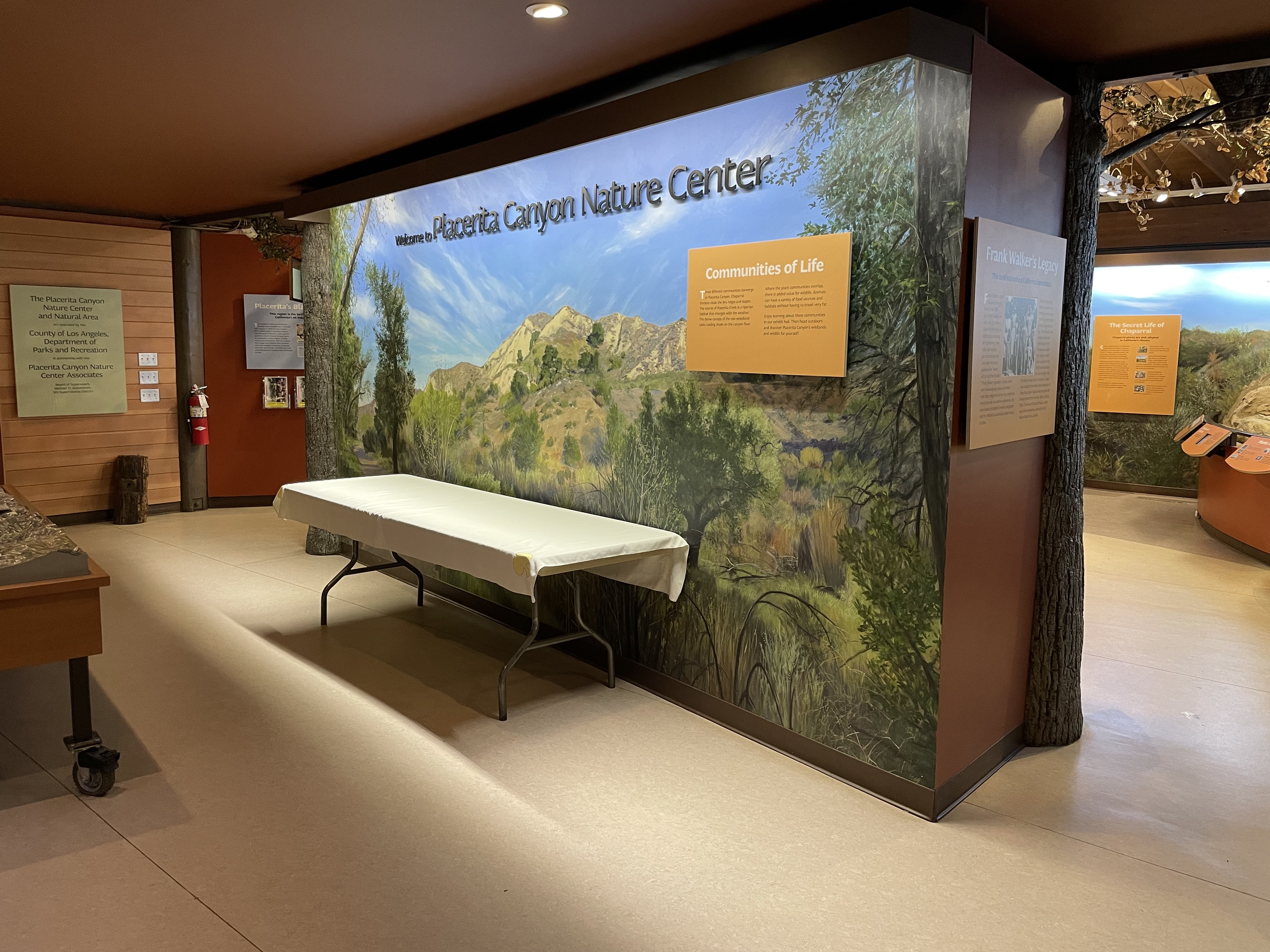
Interior of the nature center, featuring a variety of interactive nature exhibits

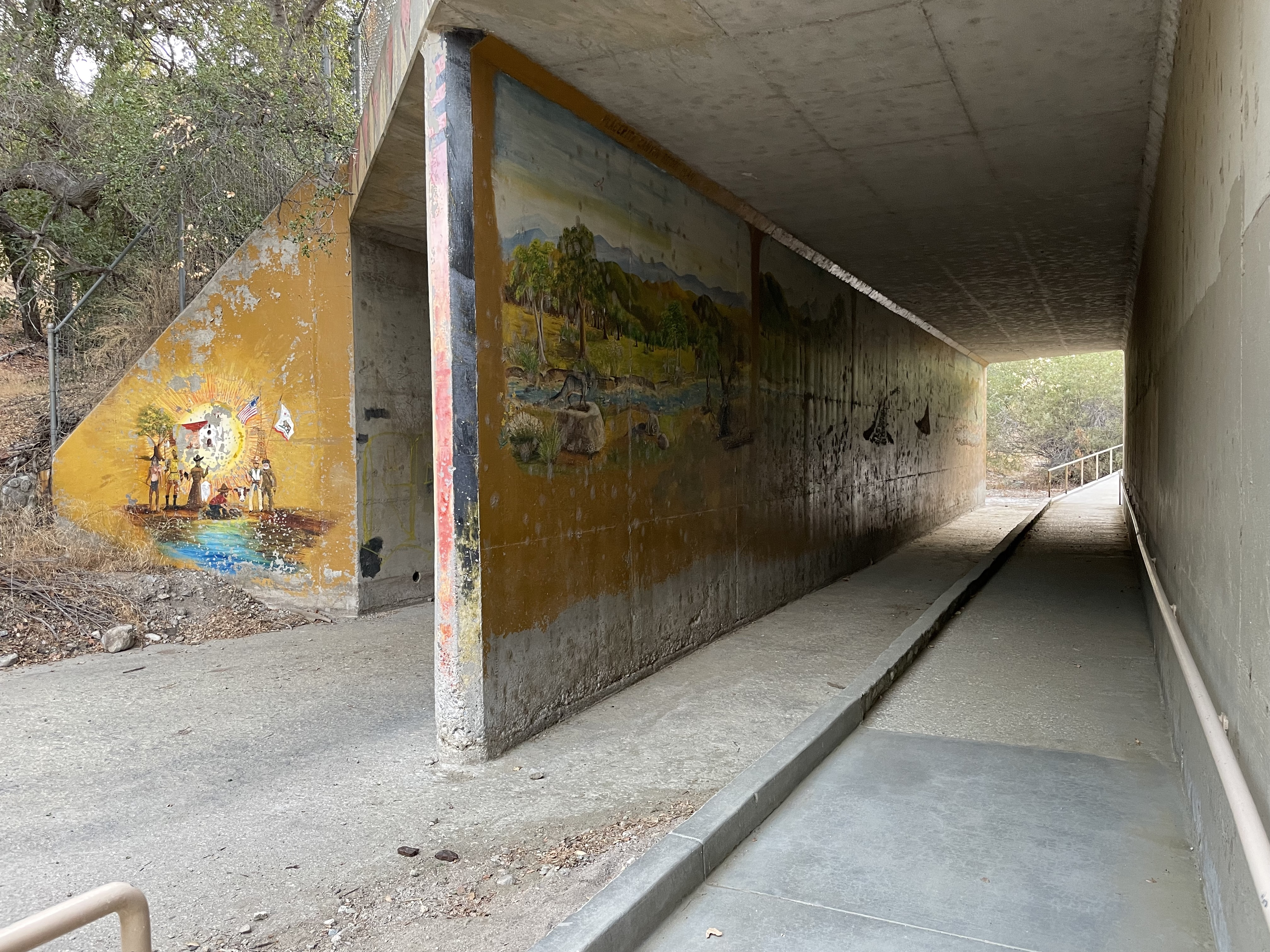
A mural depicting the valley's diverse history (left), Tataviam life prior to European settlement (center), and the discovery of gold by Francisco Lopez (not pictured)

== See also ==
- Rancho San Francisco
- Disney—Golden Oak Ranch
- Monogram Movie Ranch/Melody Ranch
- California Floristic Province
- Native American history of California
