= Sand Canyon =

Sand Canyon may refer to:

- Sand Canyon, Kern County, California
- Sand Canyon, Los Angeles County, California
- Sand Canyon Pueblo, a pueblo in the Canyons of the Ancients National Monument
