= Sand Canyon, California =

Sand Canyon, California may refer to:

- Sand Canyon, Kern County, California
- Sand Canyon, Los Angeles County, California
