= Thomas Laspeyre =

American politician

Thomas A. Laspeyre
- Born: c. 1834; North Carolina, U.S.
- Died: 1883; Montana, U.S.
- Occupations: Miner, politician, lawyer

Thomas Laspeyre (c. 1834–1883) was an American miner, politician and lawyer. He moved from North Carolina to California in 1853, making him an American pioneer, and he took up mining in San Joaquin County, California. He was a member of the California State Assembly from 1859 to 1862, where he held pro-Southern sentiment. After practicing the law in California and Nevada, he became the city attorney of Butte, Montana in the early 1880s.

== Early life ==
Thomas Laspeyre was born in North Carolina circa 1834. He had two sisters. He moved to California in 1853, making him an American pioneer.

== Career ==
Laspeyre became a miner in California.

Laspeyre served as a member of the California State Assembly for San Joaquin County from 1859 to 1862. In 1861, he voted against a state resolution for California to stay in the Union (which passed the assembly).

By 1866, Laspeyre became a lawyer in Havilah, California. He later practiced law in Eureka, Nevada.

Laspeyre moved to Butte, Montana in 1881, and he was subsequently elected as the city attorney. He was an Odd Fellow.

== Death ==
Laspeyre died in 1883 from pneumonia. He never married and had no children.
