= Brown Peak (Kern County, California) =

Mountain in California, United States

- Location within California

Highest point
- Elevation: 8,095 ft (2,467 m) NGVD 29
- Coordinates: 35°29′04″N 118°25′26″W

Geography
- Location: Kern County, California, U.S.
- Parent range: Piute Mountains, Sierra Nevada
- Topo map: USGS Piute Peak

Brown Peak is a peak located in Kern County, California. The peak is located on King Solomons Ridge at the head of Haight Canyon, 2.1 miles (3.4 km) southwest of Liebel Peak and 12.5 miles (20 km) north of Loraine, California in Sequoia National Forest.

Brown Peak is named for Charlie Brown, a miner who lived in the area during the early 1900s.
