= Havilah, California =

Unincorporated community in California, United States

- Unincorporated community
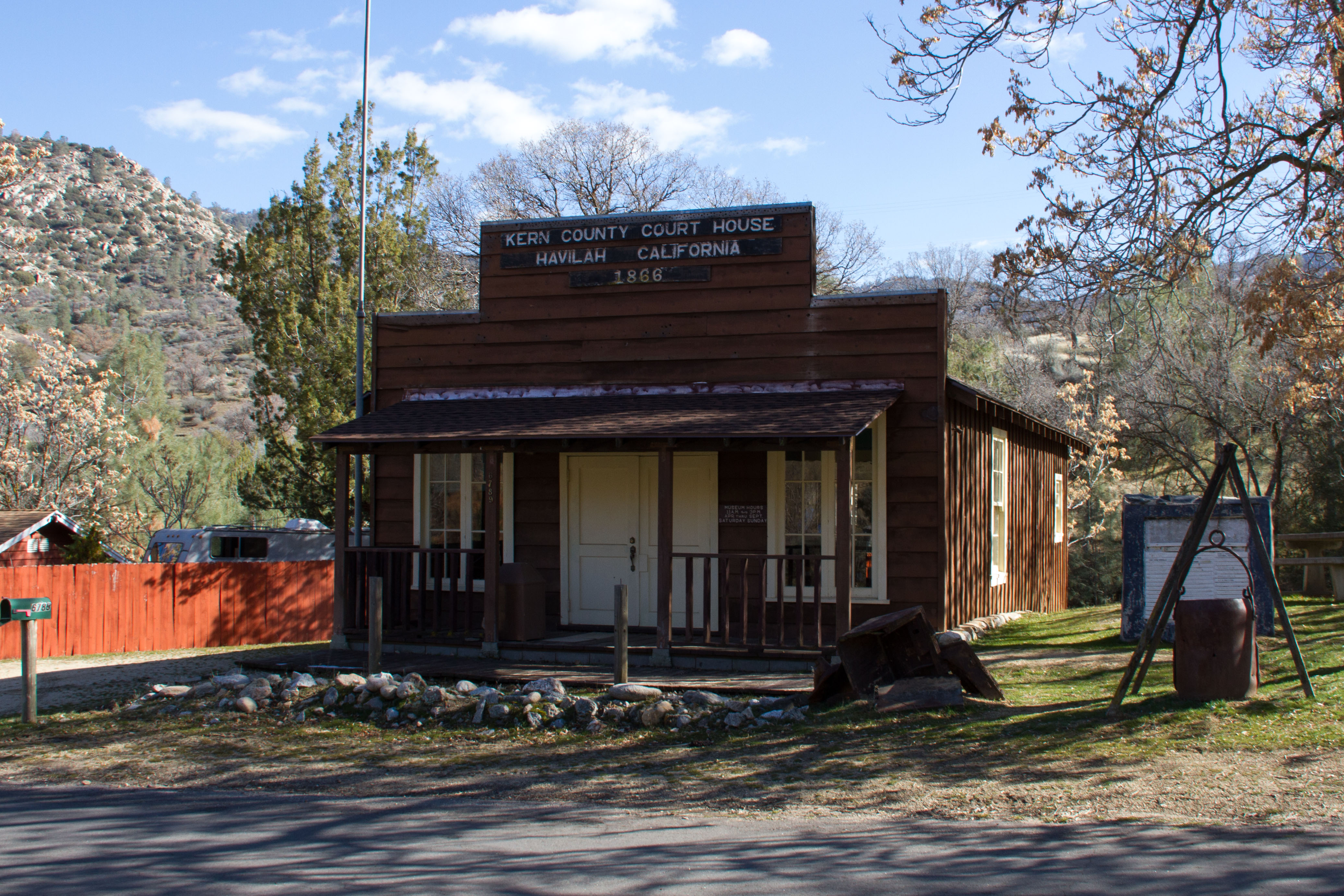
- A replica of the 1868 courthouse was built in 1966 and served as a museum until destroyed by the 2024 Borel Fire.

- Location in California Location within the United States
- Coordinates: 35°31′04″N 118°31′07″W
- Country: United States
- State: California
- County: Kern
- Elevation: 3,136 ft (956 m)

California Historical Landmark
- Reference no.: 100

Havilah is an unincorporated community in Kern County, California, United States that was mostly destroyed by the 2024 Borel Fire. The land is located in the mountains between Walker Basin and the Kern River Valley, 5 miles (8.0 km) south-southwest of Bodfish at an elevation of 3,136 feet (956 m).

== History ==
Asbury Harpending arrived in the area, where there were many southern-sympathizers, in 1864. After finding gold deposits on Clear Creek, a tributary of the Kern River, the group claimed a townsite on the road from Keyesville to Tehachapi and named it after the Biblical land of Havilah, "where there is gold" according to Genesis 2:11. By the end of 1865, Havilah was a boom town with 147 business buildings, thirteen saloons, and a population of nearly a thousand, mostly miners working the Clear Creek Mining District.

Havilah was the county seat at the founding of Kern County on April 2, 1866, and the county's first newspaper, the Havilah Courier, began publication that same year. The county government was moved to Bakersfield in 1874.

A post office operated at Havilah from 1866 to 1918. The Havilah School District, formed in 1866, was the first public school in Kern County.

Nearby historic mining communities include Loraine, (originally named Paris) and Twin Oaks. The town is now registered as California Historical Landmark #100.

== Modern ==
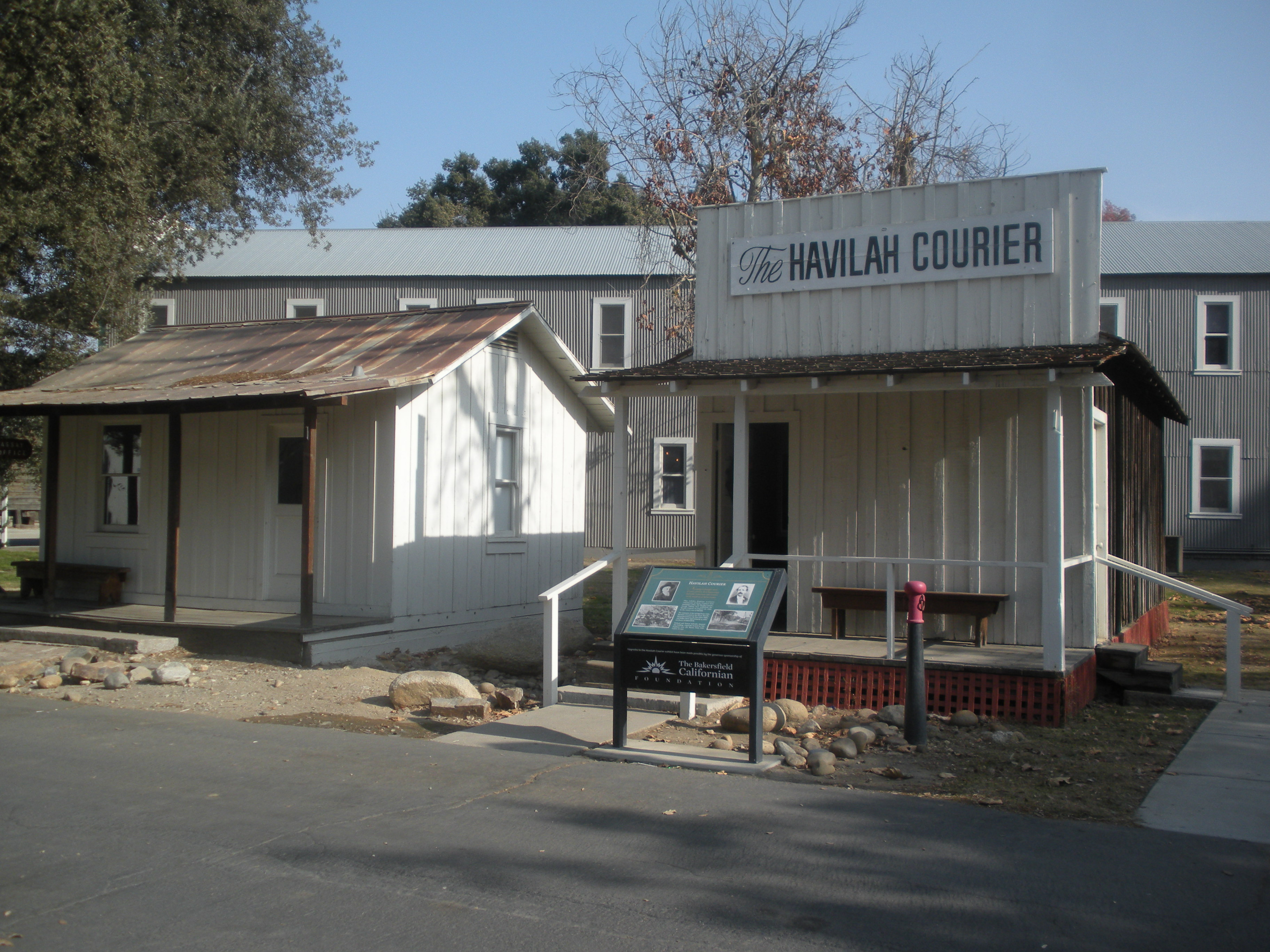
The former Havilah Courier building, now located at the Kern County Museum

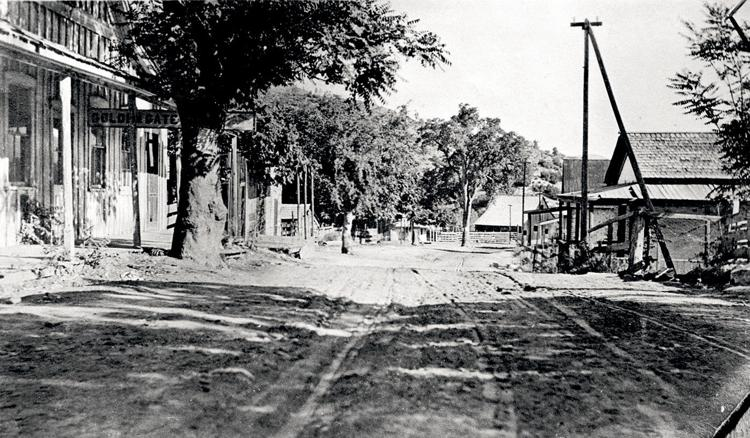
Havilah, California in 1910

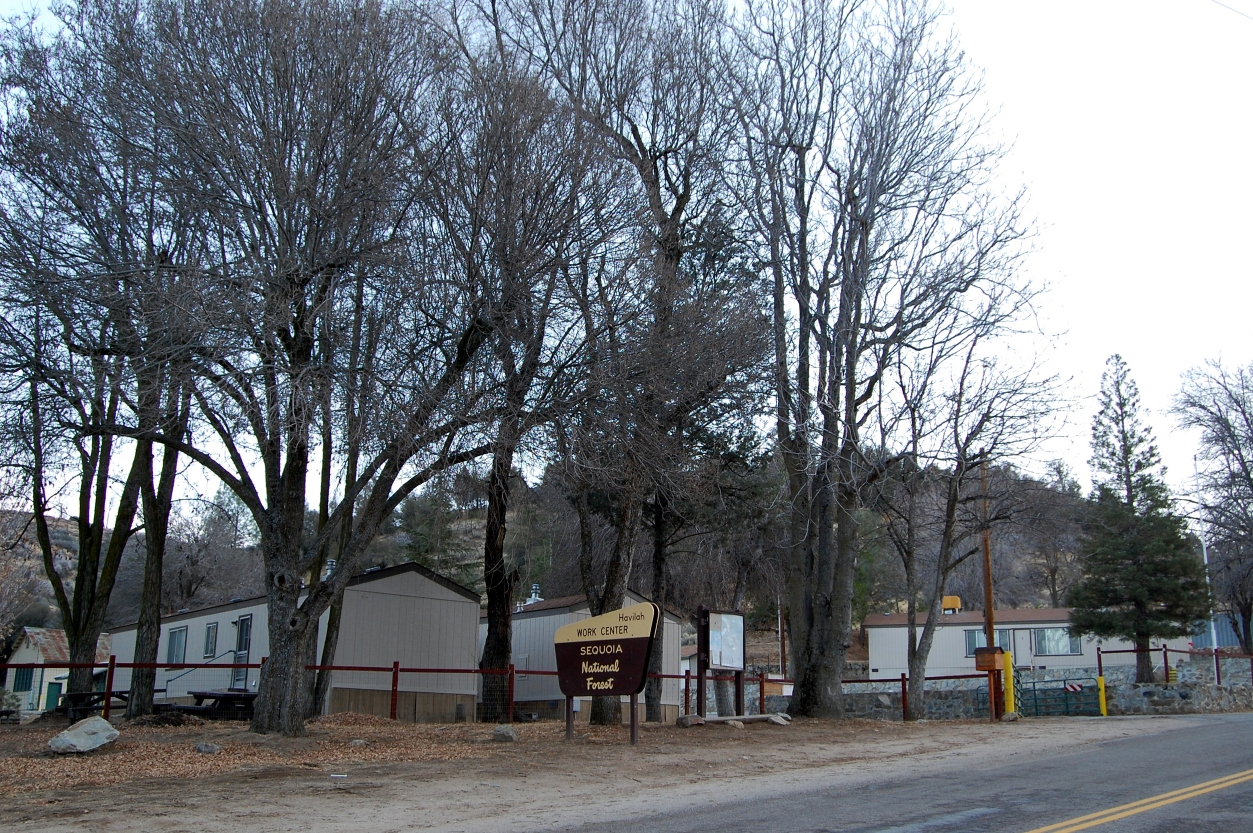
The Sequoia National Forest Work Center on Caliente-Bodfish Road c. 2007.

Aside from the Old Havilah Cemetery, little remains from the original settlement, most of which was destroyed by fires in the 1920s. A replica of the courthouse and one-room schoolhouse were constructed near their original locations. The sides of Caliente-Bodfish Road in Havilah are lined with signs marking where other historic buildings once stood. However, in July 2024 a wildfire leveled much of the community. The courthouse replica was destroyed but firefighters were able to save the schoolhouse.

A US Forest Service fire station is situated along Caliente-Bodfish Road at 35°30′38″N 118°31′06″W.

The US Geological Survey plots several mines nearby. Names of local mines include:

- Southern Cross Mine
- Friday Mine
- Uncle Sam Mine
- McKeadney Mine

== Districts, zones, boundaries, and services ==
The ZIP Code is 93518, and the community is inside area code 661. Havilah shares its postal ZIP Code with the nearby communities of Caliente and Loraine. The community is within the Kern County Air Pollution Control District.

The area is bordered to the east and west by Sequoia National Forest lands and is located at the junction of Havilah Canyon and Haight Canyon. Elevations at the floor of the canyon range from approximately 3,050 feet (930 m) AMSL to 3,400 feet (1,000 m). Havilah Canyon runs roughly north–south and mountain peaks to the east and west are over 1,000 feet (300 m) higher than the roadway, which runs along the floor of Havilah Canyon. King Solomons Ridge lies to the east; Hobo Ridge lies to the west. Snow may be present during winter months.

The community falls within the Battalion 7 area of the Kern County Fire Department. It is listed by the California Fire Alliance as being at high risk to wildfire.

Commercial electric power is supplied by Southern California Edison.

== California Historical Landmark ==
The California Historical Landmark reads:

NO. 100 HAVILAH - Gold deposits at Havilah were discovered in 1864. Havilah was the county seat between 1866, when Kern County was organized, and 1872, when the government was moved to Bakersfield. Havilah was an active mining center for more than 20 years, and there are still some operating mines in this vicinity.

A state plaque is located at 10 Miller St. in Bodfish, California. A private plaque is at 6789 Caliente-Bodfish Rd., Havilah, California.

== See also ==
- California Historical Landmarks in Kern County
- California Historical Landmark
