= Twin Oaks, Kern County, California =

Unincorporated community in California, United States

Twin Oaks
- Unincorporated community
- Location in California Twin Oaks (the United States)
- Coordinates: 35°18′45″N 118°24′35″W
- Country: United States
- State: California
- County: Kern
- Elevation: 2,825 ft (861 m)

Twin Oaks is an unincorporated community in Kern County, California, United States. It is located 1.5 miles (2.4 km) east-northeast of Loraine, at an elevation of 2,825 feet (861 m).

A post office operated at Twin Oaks from 1926 to 1931.
