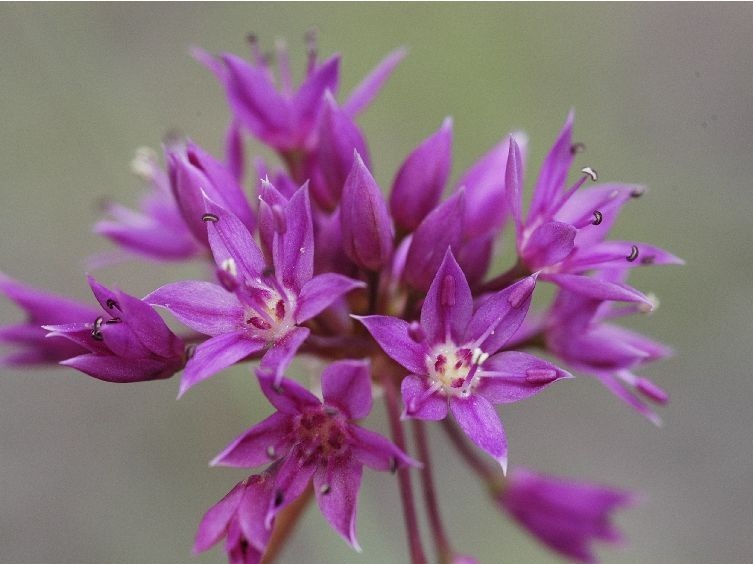
- Flowers

Conservation status
- Apparently Secure (NatureServe)

Scientific classification
- Kingdom: Plantae
- Clade: Tracheophytes
- Clade: Angiosperms
- Clade: Monocots
- Order: Asparagales
- Family: Amaryllidaceae
- Subfamily: Allioideae
- Genus: Allium
- Species: A. bisceptrum

Binomial name
- Allium bisceptrum S.Watson

Synonyms
- Allium bisceptrum var. palmeri (S. Watson) Cronquist; Allium bisceptrum var. utahense M.E. Jones; Allium palmeri S. Watson

= Allium bisceptrum =

Twincrest onion

Species of flowering plant

Allium bisceptrum, also known as the twincrest onion or aspen onion, is a high elevation plant native to western United States. It is a perennial that thrives under damp and shady conditions or open meadows in California, Arizona, New Mexico, Nevada, Oregon, Washington, Idaho, and Utah.

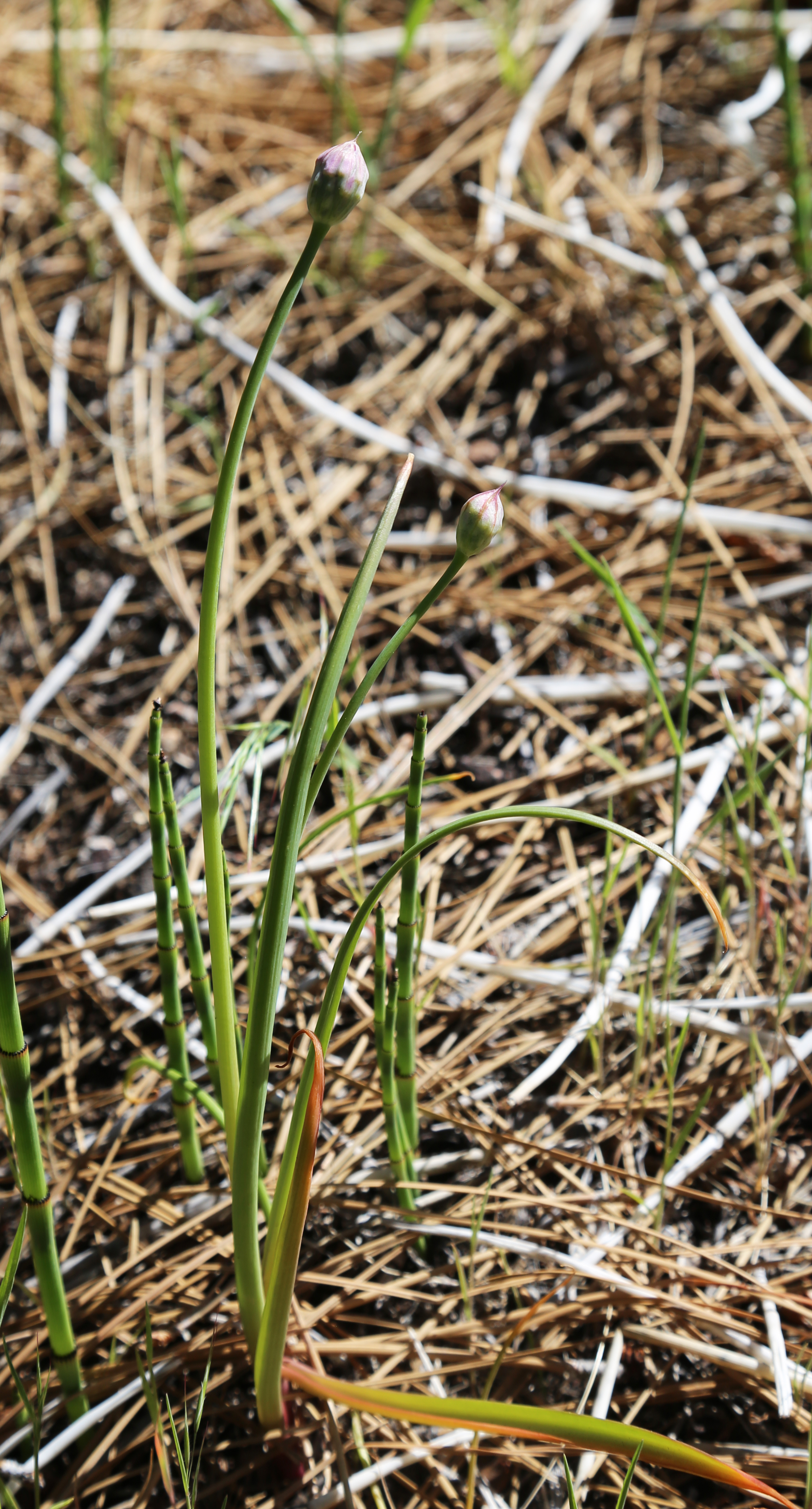
Allium bisceptrum buds, leaves

Allium bisceptrum is used sometimes as food flavoring as their leaves may be very strong and odorous. Natives pray before picking the leaves of this plant. Many animals in the region, including elk, black bears and prairie dogs, eat the bulbs of the wild onions.

== Description ==
The twincrest onion is a perennial at altitudes ranging from 2000 to 2900 meters. It grows to between ten and forty cm high. The onion bulbs are round and egg-shaped. The bulbs have a light tint and when cut, have a powerful odor. The flower heads are about 10–15 mm in length. The flowers are varying shades of purple or pink. Each flower head contains six sharply pointed tepals and often a darker stripe. Their long, flat leaves usually come in pairs of two, stay green longer than for most other onions, and give off an odor when scratched.

== Habitat and ecology ==
Allium bisceptrum is found in mixed pine forests or in wetland-riparian habitats in California. It thrives near streambanks, in aspen groves, or in meadows.

== Distribution ==
In California, A. bisceptrum is distributed throughout the counties of Alpine, El Dorado, Glenn, Inyo, Lassen, Mendocino, Mono, Modoc, Mariposa, Nevada, Plumas, San Bernardino, San Diego, Shasta, Sierra, Trinity, Tulare, and Tuolumne. It is also widely distributed in Nevada, Utah, Arizona, southeastern Oregon, and southern Idaho with isolated populations reported from northern Idaho and from southeastern Washington (Franklin County).

== Uses ==
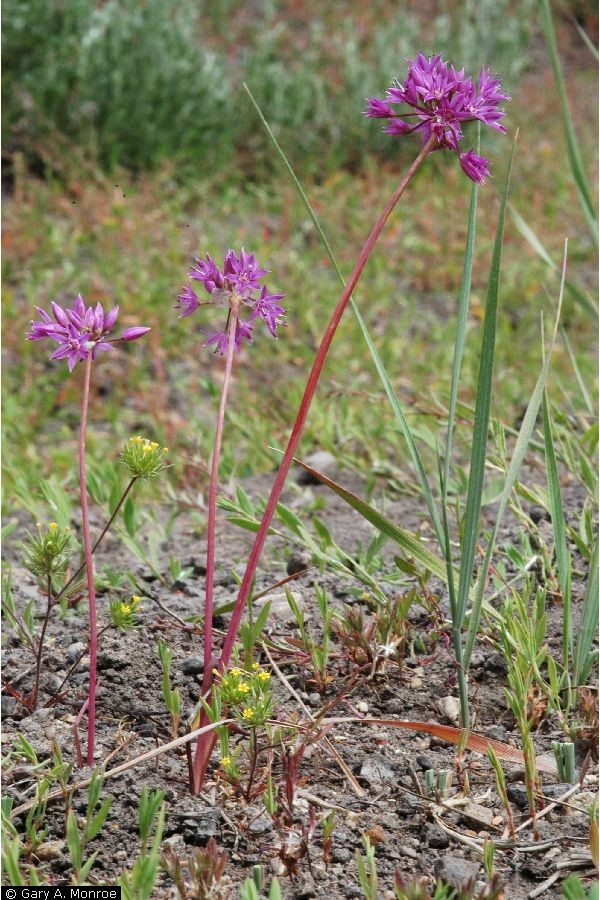
Flowering Allium bisceptrum ready for leaves to be picked and eaten. This is a mature plant that may produce seeds and bulbs for replanting.

Twincrest onions grow at high elevations and thrive in the cold. Their seeds can be planted outdoors in the early fall. They do not need to be warmed throughout the winter. In fact, in warmer winters, the plants may need to be kept at lower temperatures to insure growth and germination. Soil must not be drowned with water. It must be kept relatively drained. Their seeds should be planted in a nice and dense model with around four to five seeds per square foot of soil. Watering early on is not necessary unless extremely dry. Rain water should be enough to keep the plant alive until germination in the spring. When spring time arrives, two inches of water a week should be administered. If watered correctly, wild onions will begin to grow. They can grow in the sunlight, but they prefer the shade. It is necessary to keep the soil nice and moist, but not too wet because these growing onion bulbs do not have enough reserves to keep the plant alive. Watering should be discontinued as soon as yellow foliage begins to appear. At this point, the plant should be ready to mature and flower on its own. At least three to five years should be expected for this plant to reach a flowering size.

The bulbs and bulblets of the twincrest onion may be planted as well. Maturity and flowering may come quicker planting by bulbs than planting by seeds. To do so, bulbs must be picked from the mature wild onion plant. These bulbs must then be stored in a dry environment (paper bags with dry peat moss is ideal). Late fall, when the first frost comes, is the best time to plant these bulbs. These bulbs should be planted in an acidic potting soil with sand and humus for good drainage. Daughter bulblets may be planted next to mature bulbs to keep the dense pattern. Maintenance must be in order to make sure these bulbs do not receive too much water. These bulbs will germinate on their own in the spring time. When germination begins in the spring, water must be administered at least once a week. If it is a dry and rainless week, water should be administered twice that week. Adding a liquid fertilizer may increase growth and vigor. When flowering occurs, watering may be ceased.

While harvesting, the Washoe keep some of the plants intact so the plant will continue to seed. They also do not uproot the bulbs so plants will continue to grow year after year.

The twincrest onion is still used today by many native Americans including the Nevada Northern Paiute, Gosiute, Northern Ute, and Washoe. The Washoe use the leaves and greens of this plant as a spice and flavor their foods. They pick out the young leaves and stems of the plant after the last of the snow melts in early spring. These young leaves and stems, which are only inches from the ground are the most delectable as their flavors range from mild to strong. The Washoe sometimes pray before picking these leaves in hopes of a good harvesting year. These leaves are similar to chives bought from supermarkets. These leaves can be used in various culinary forms, whether eaten raw, or stir fried with meats and other vegetables.

Wild animals in the area such as elk, black bears, white-tailed prairie dogs, and mantled ground squirrels eat the bulbs of the wild onions. Some cattle and sheep also graze these plants.
