= Canyon Country, Santa Clarita, California =

Neighborhood of Santa Clarita, California

Canyon Country
- Neighborhood of Santa Clarita
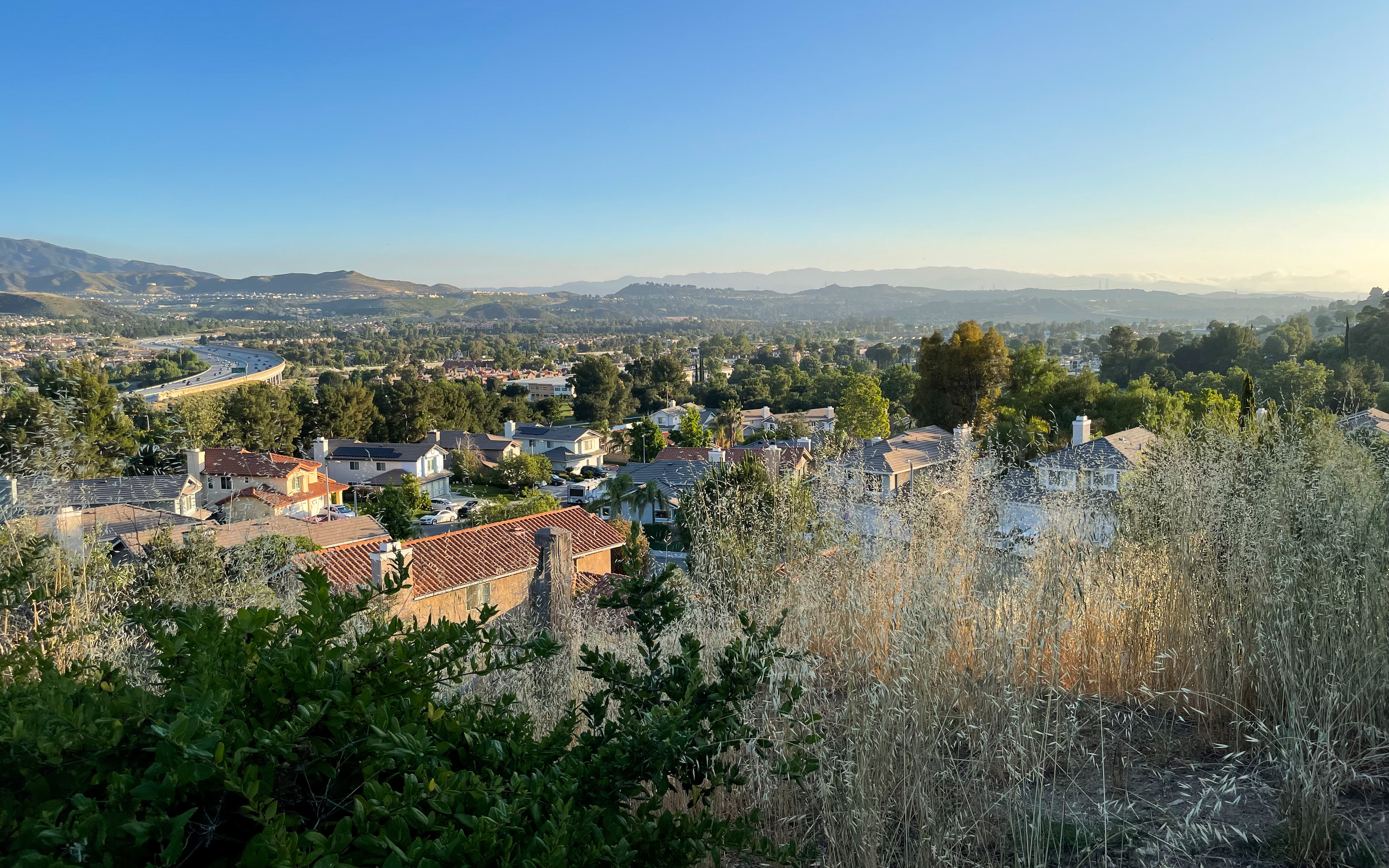
- View from Canyon Country Park, looking southwest toward the San Gabriel Mountains

- Position in Santa Clarita. Canyon Country (the Los Angeles metropolitan area) Canyon Country (California)
- Coordinates: 34.42°N 118.45°W
- Country: United States
- State: California
- County: Los Angeles
- City: Santa Clarita
- Elevation: 1,510 ft (460 m)
- Time zone: UTC-8 (Pacific (PST))
  - Summer (DST): UTC-7 (PDT)
- ZIP Code: 91321, 91350, 91351, 91387, 91390
- Area code: 661
- GNIS feature ID: 1946238
- Website: https://santaclarita.gov/

Canyon Country is a neighborhood in the eastern part of the city of Santa Clarita, in northwestern Los Angeles County, California, United States. It lies along the Santa Clara River between the Sierra Pelona Mountains and the San Gabriel Mountains. It is the most populous of Santa Clarita's four neighborhoods.

== History ==
The area was the ancestral homeland of the Tataviam people for over five hundred years, and other tribes before then, such as the Tongva, Kitanemuk, and Serrano people. After Spanish settlement, the valley became grazing lands of the Mission San Fernando Rey de España around 1790.

In the 1880s, the rancho become the Newhall Ranch empire of Henry Newhall, from which his family started the Newhall Land and Farming Company after his death. In 1928, the St. Francis Dam collapsed, suddenly flooding and washing away settlements and people along the Santa Clara River section of present-day Santa Clarita not including Canyon Country. Canyon Country was originally called Solemint. It later absorbed the community to the west called Honby. In the 1960s and 1970s, the Newhall Land company's suburban developments transformed the surrounding areas into a largely residential city.

In 1987, Canyon Country was one of four communities, along with Valencia, Newhall, and Saugus, that merged to create the city of Santa Clarita, California.

== Geography ==
Canyon Country is located on the east side of Santa Clarita, along the Santa Clara River. It occupies roughly the portion of Santa Clarita east of Golden Valley Road, and is bordered by Saugus to the west and Newhall to the southwest. The Sierra Pelona Mountains lie north of the community, and the San Gabriel Mountains lie to the south and east. Both ranges are part of the Angeles National Forest.

Canyon Country lies primarily within ZIP Codes 91351 and 91387. The boundary between the two ZIP Codes mostly follows Sierra Highway—addresses west of or along the highway are in 91351, while addresses east of the highway are in 91387. ZIP Codes 91321, 91350, and 91390 also include small portions of Canyon Country.

Due to its location adjacent to the mountainous Angeles National Forest, and its aridity (especially in summer), Canyon Country is susceptible to wildfires. The Buckweed Fire in October 2007 burned nearly 38,000 acres (15,000 ha) throughout Canyon Country and Agua Dulce. The Sand Fire took place in Canyon Country in July and August 2016 and burned nearly 42,000 acres (17,000 ha) of land.

== Neighborhoods ==
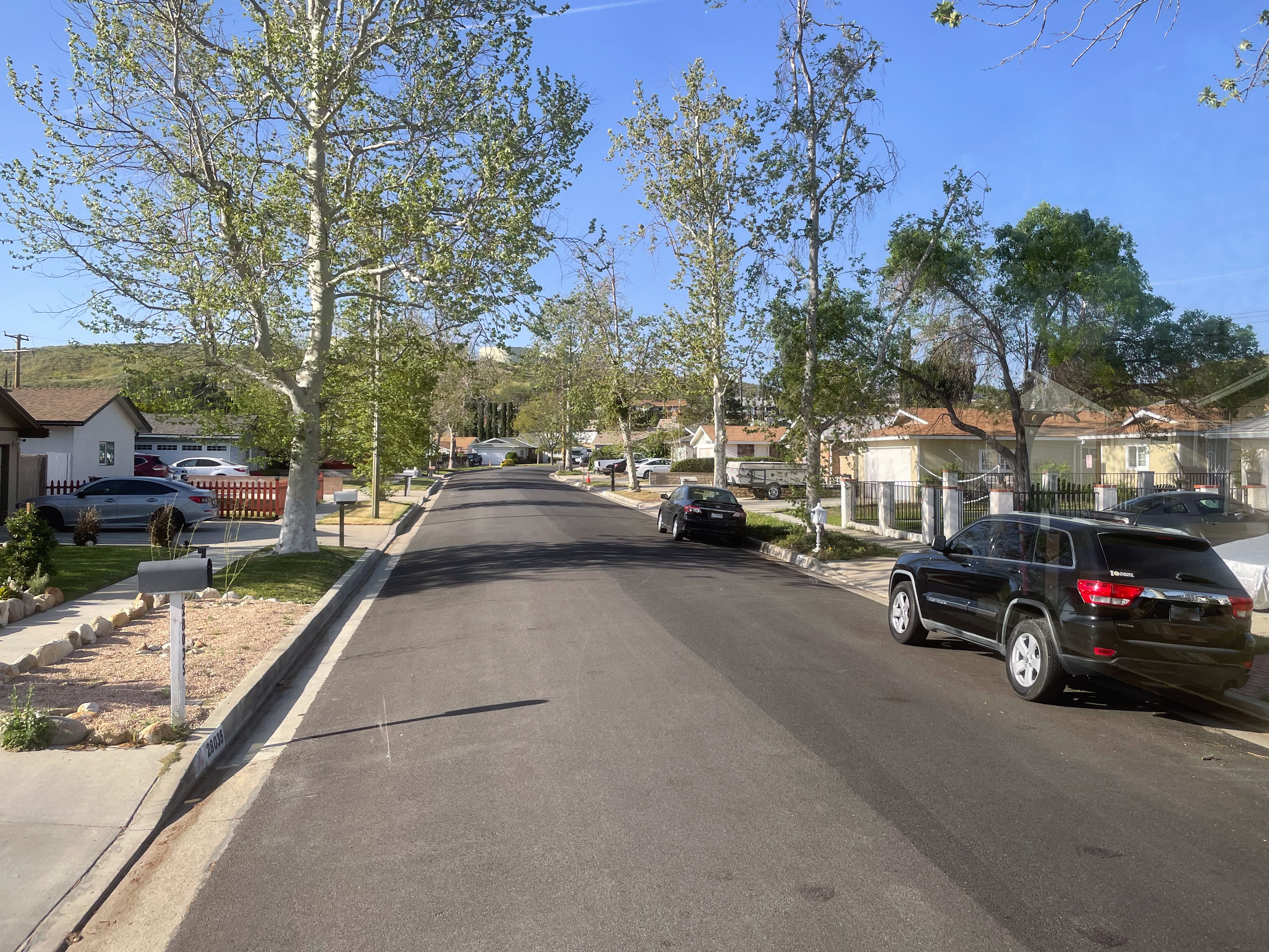
Mid-century homes in Whites Canyon

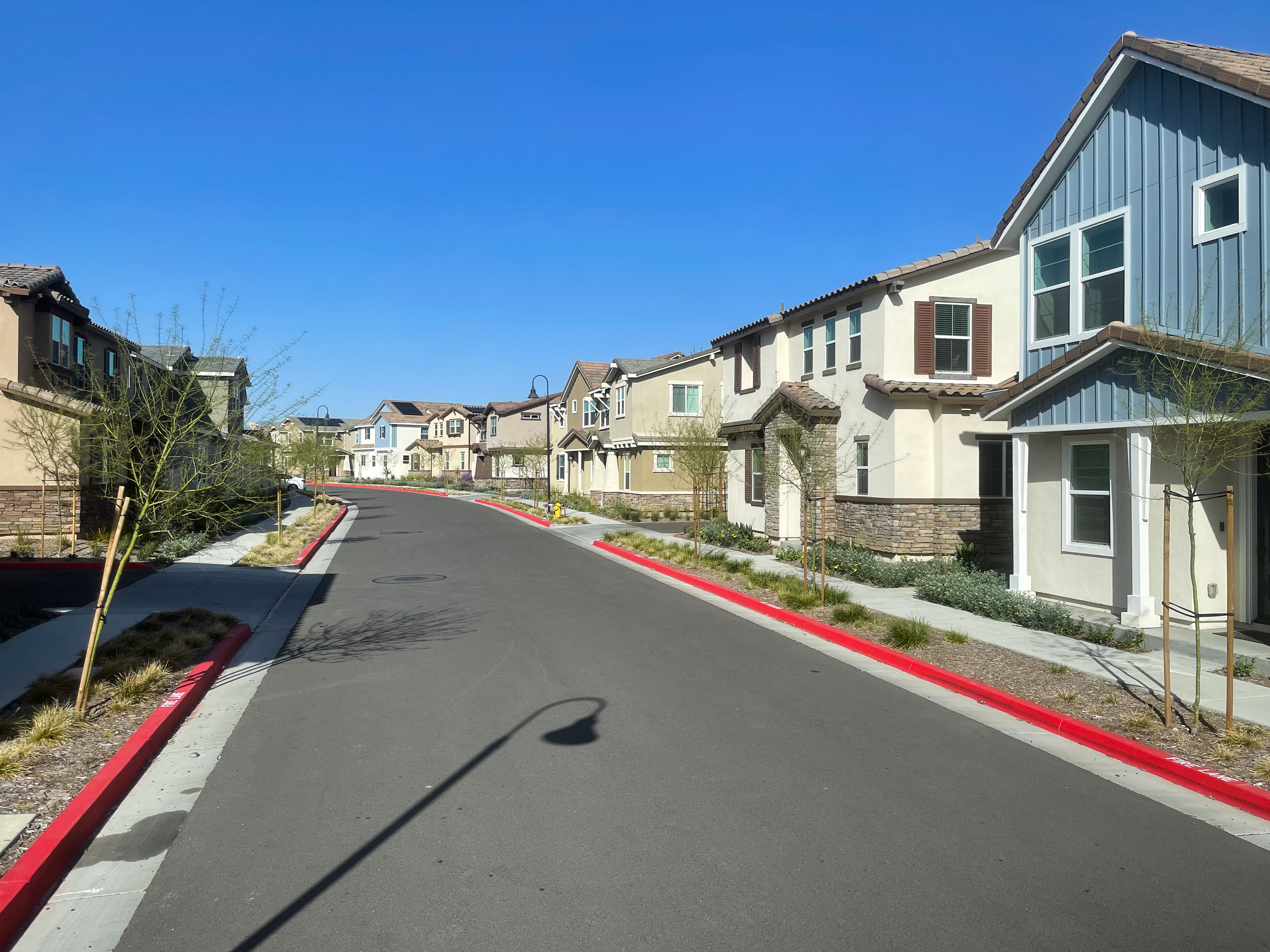
Contemporary tract housing in Vista Canyon

Canyon Country has the highest number of unique neighborhoods of any borough in Santa Clarita. Most derive their names from natural landforms such as a canyon or from a ranch that was once located there. A neighborhood may include a variety of housing tracts with unique names.

Notable neighborhoods and communities include:

- Aliento
- American Beauty
- Fair Oaks Ranch
- Friendly Valley
- Golden Valley
- Humphreys
- Honby
- Mint Canyon
- Oak Spring Canyon
- Rainbow Glen
- Rio Seco
- River Ranch
- Sand Canyon
- Solemint
- Shangri La
- Skyline Ranch
- Stetson Ranch
- Tick Canyon (includes Pinetree and Shadow Pines)
- Tres Robles
- Vista Canyon
- Vista del Cañon
- Whites Canyon (includes Canyon Crest and Falcon Ridge)

The oldest neighborhood in Canyon Country is Whites Canyon, traditionally named "Canyon Country". The neighborhood includes both Sierra Vista Junior High and Canyon High School. Some of the newest neighborhoods in Canyon Country include Skyline Ranch and Vista Canyon, the latter of which is still under construction as of April 2023.

== Demographics ==
As of the 2020 census, the population of Canyon Country was 92,897. 41.7% of residents were Hispanic, 36.7% were non-Hispanic white, 13.9% were Asian American, 7.4% were African American, and 3.1% were Native American.

== Education ==
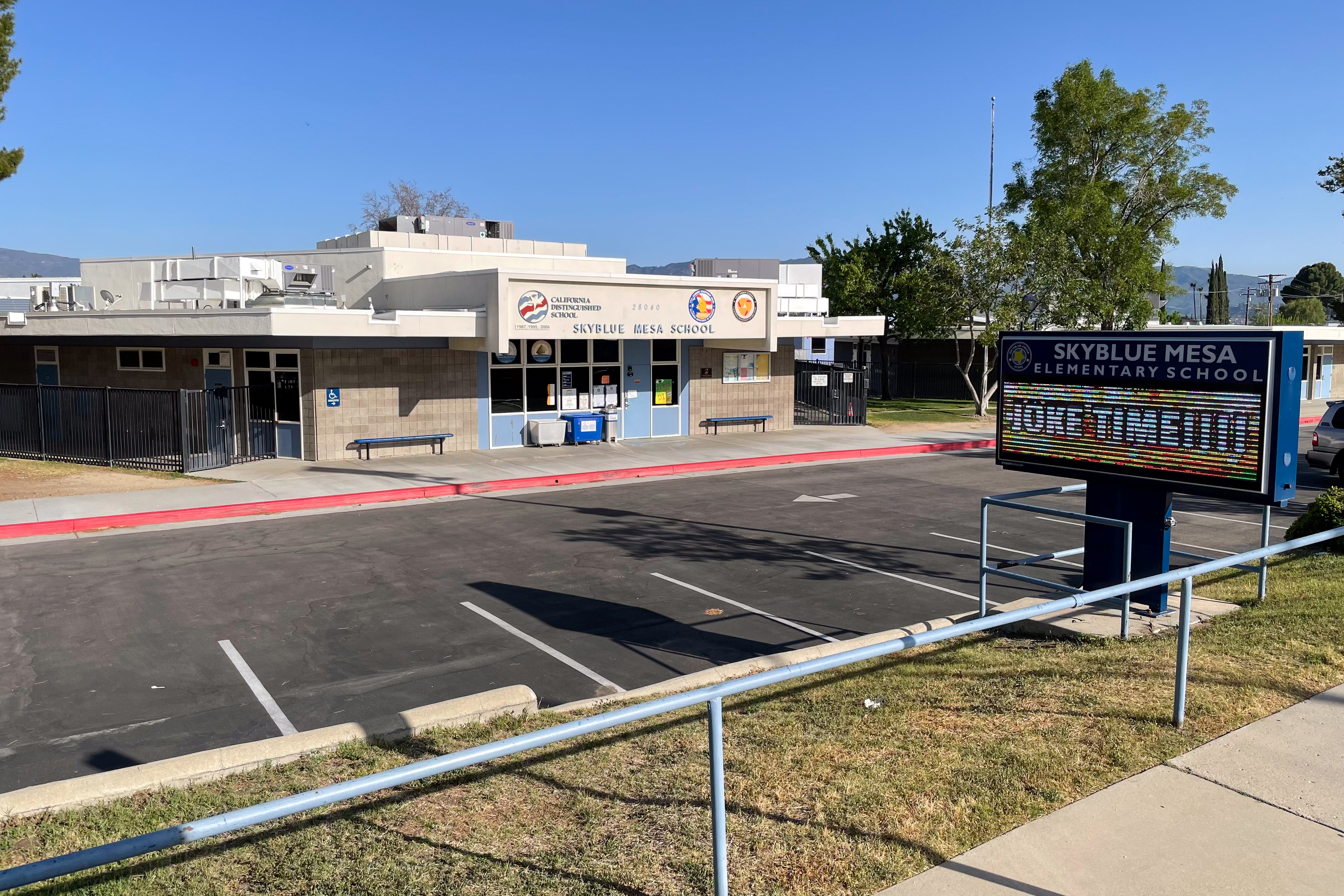
Skyblue Mesa Elementary School, part of the Saugus Union School District

Canyon Country elementary school students attend schools in Saugus Union School District and Sulphur Springs School District.

Middle and high school students in Canyon Country attend schools in the William S. Hart Union High School District, in particular Sierra Vista and La Mesa Junior High Schools, and Canyon and Golden Valley High Schools.

Santa Clarita Christian School is located in Canyon Country. College of the Canyons has a satellite campus in Canyon Country in addition to its main campus in Valencia. Charter College has a campus in Canyon Country, one of three campuses in California (the others are in Lancaster and Oxnard).

== Services ==
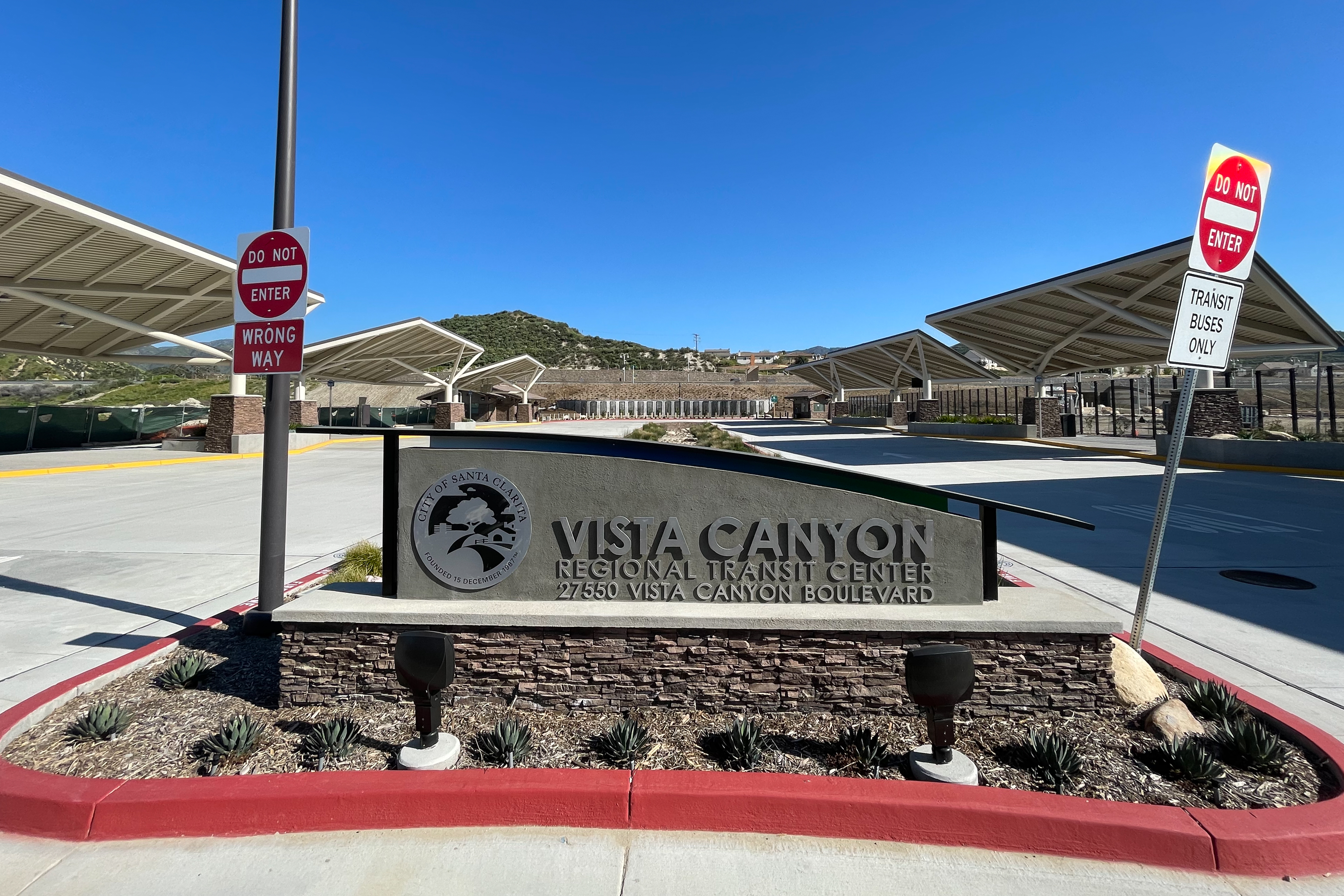
Vista Canyon Regional Transit Center

Canyon Country is served by the Los Angeles County Sheriff's Department and Los Angeles County Fire Department. The fire stations serving Canyon Country are 104, 107, 123, 128, 132, and 150.

City of Santa Clarita Transit operates bus services throughout Canyon Country along routes 5, 6, and 12. Route 12 provides direct connections to Metrolink's Antelope Valley Line at Via Princessa station. The Vista Canyon Regional Transit Center will become the central transit hub of Canyon Country once completed by the end of 2023.

== Parks and recreation ==
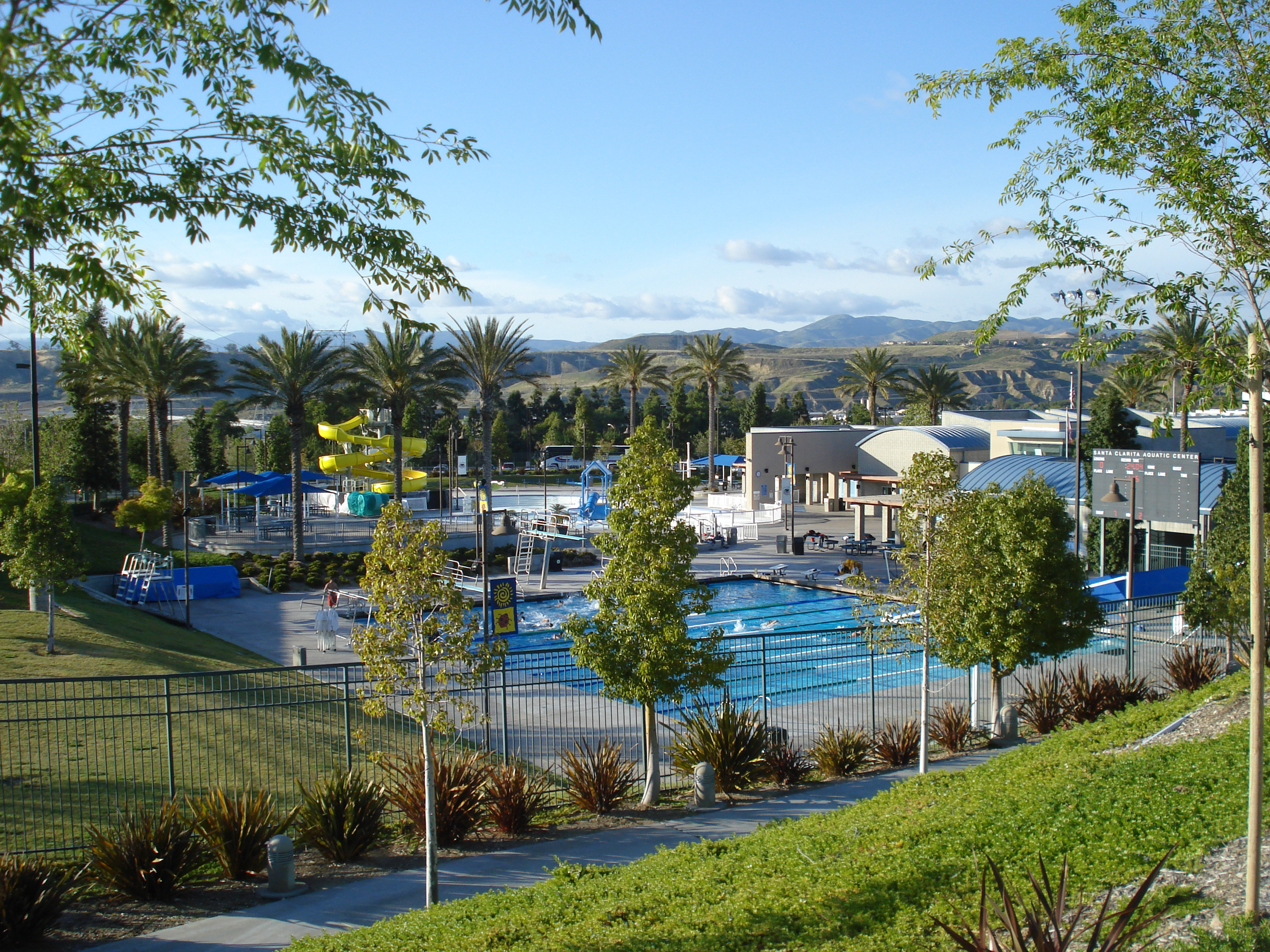
Santa Clarita Aquatics Center, part of the larger George A. Caravalho Sports Complex

Canyon Country is served by the park system of the city of Santa Clarita. Parks in Canyon Country include Canyon Country Park (the largest), North Oaks Park, Discovery Park, Todd Longshore Park, Fair Oaks Park, Oak Spring Canyon Park, and Begonias Lane Park. The city's newest park, Plum Canyon Park, is located in northern Canyon Country on the border with Saugus.

The George A. Caravalho Santa Clarita Sports Complex in far western Canyon Country includes a gymnasium with two indoor, full-sized basketball courts, four pickleball courts, two volleyball courts, two futsal courts, and four racquetball courts. The Sports Complex includes the City of Santa Clarita Activities Center (a.k.a. The Centre) which contains rooms for banquets and meetings. Adjacent to the Sports Complex is the Santa Clarita Aquatic Center, which includes three large swimming pools and several water slides; the Trek Bike Park of Santa Clarita (opened September 2020) covering 7 acres including BMX and mountain biking trails; and the Santa Clarita Skate Park. Many city-sponsored recreational programs are held at the Sports Complex and adjacent facilities. It is located along Centre Pointe Parkway just east of Golden Valley Road.

== In popular culture ==
The house of the Crandall family used in the movie Don't Tell Mom the Babysitter's Dead is located in this community. A home here was also featured in the climax of Real Genius, but it no longer exists.

== See also ==
- Sand Canyon (part of Canyon Country)
- Lang Southern Pacific Station, a California Historic Landmark
