= Sand Fire (2016) =

2016 wildfire in Southern California

- Part of the 2016 California wildfires
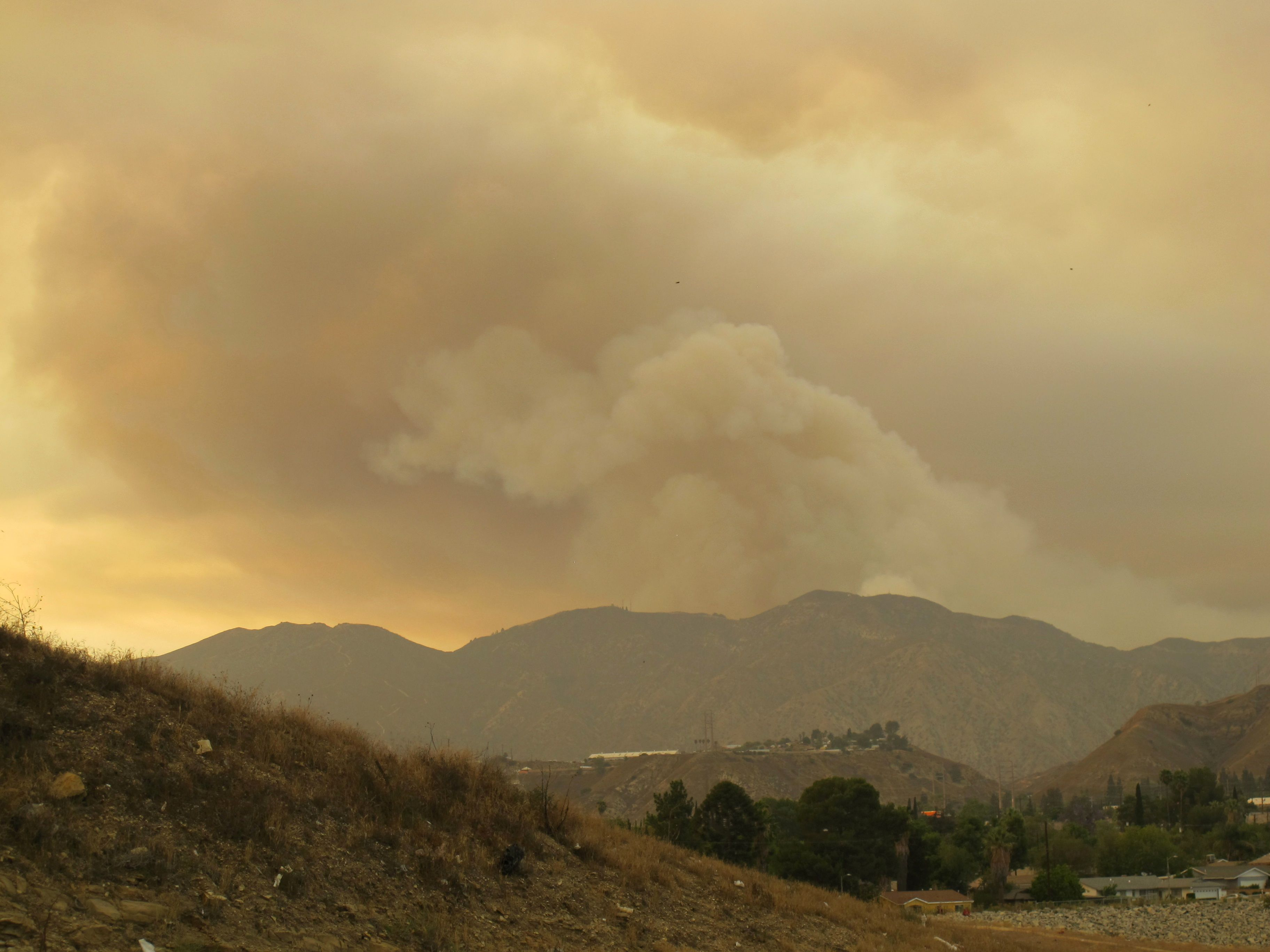
- View of the smoke plume of the Sand Fire from Hansen Dam, July 23, 2016
- Date: July 22, 2016 –; August 3, 2016
- Location: Santa Clarita Valley, Los Angeles County, California
- Coordinates: 34.431°N 118.398°W

Statistics
- Burned area: 41,432 acres (168 km^{2})

Impacts
- Deaths: 2
- Structures lost: 18

Map
- Location in Los Angeles

The Sand Fire was a wildfire in 2016 that burned in the Angeles National Forest, east of the Santa Clarita Valley in Los Angeles County, California. The fire, named for the area's Sand Canyon, was fueled by heavy chaparral and brush.

== The fire ==
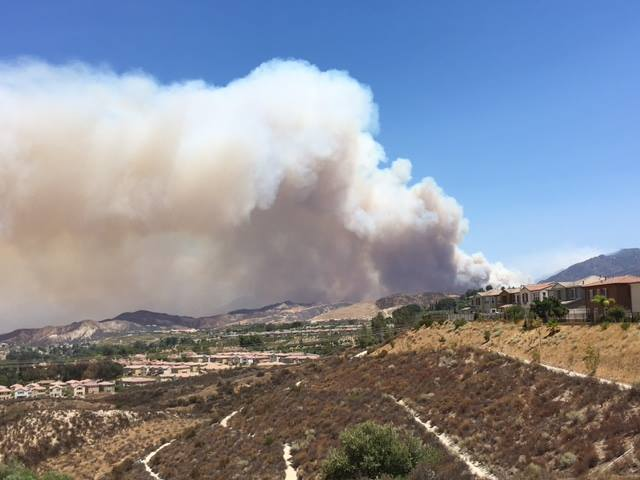
Afternoon winds on July 24 increased the intensity of the Sand Fire

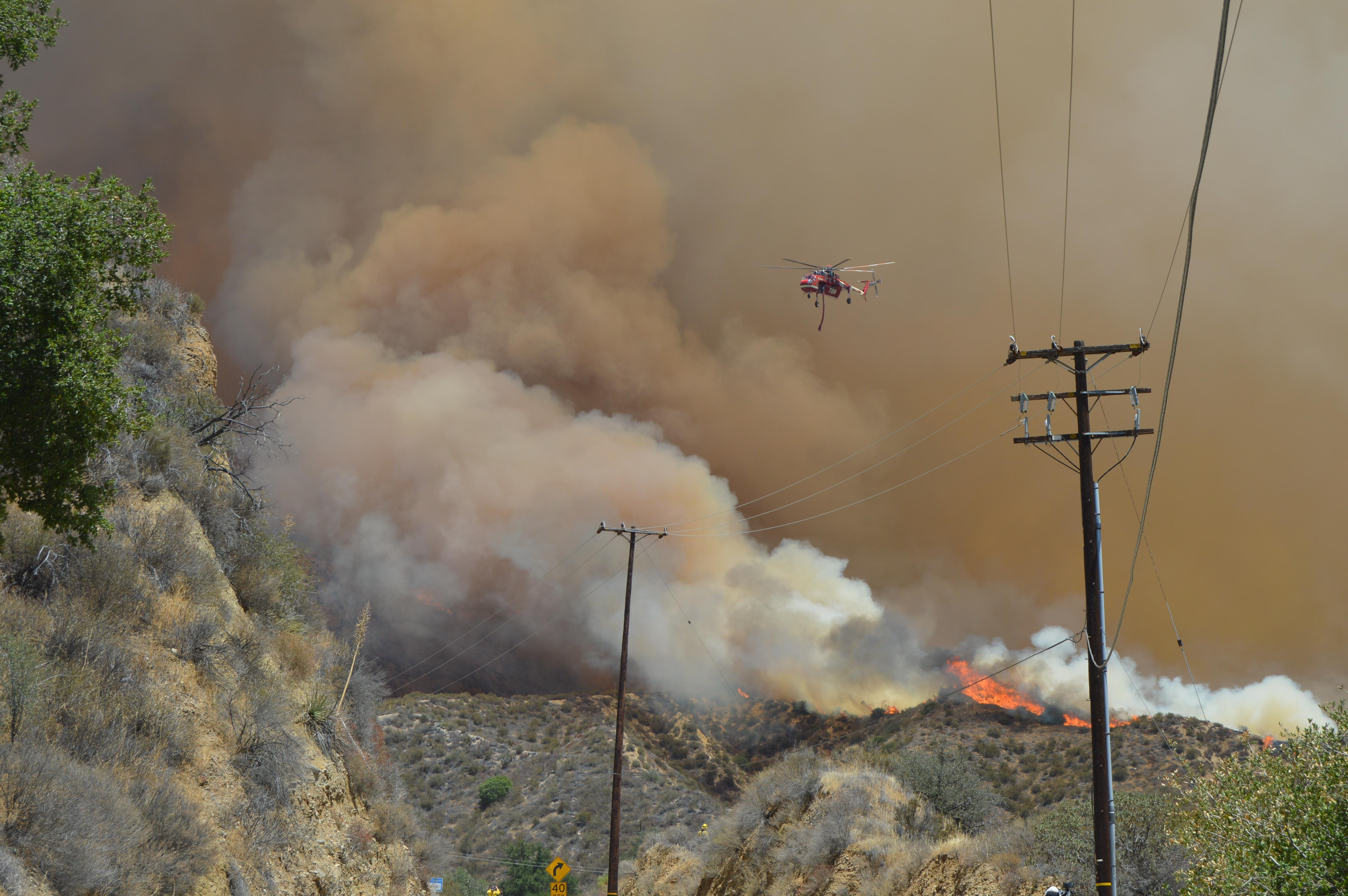
A Sikorsky S-64 Skycrane flies over the fire on July 25th.

The fire started around 2:10 p.m. on July 22, 2016, near the intersection Soledad Canyon Road and Sand Canyon Road. By 10 P.M., less than 8 hours after it was reported, the fire had burned at least 3,300 acres (13 km^{2}). At the time the fire broke out, temperatures were over 110 °F (43 °C) with sustained winds of 15 miles per hour (24 km/h) gusting up to 25 miles per hour (40 km/h).

The Santa Clarita Valley remained under a Red flag warning throughout the 23rd with temperatures reaching 106 °F (41 °C) and sustained 10-mile-per-hour (16 km/h) winds. By the evening of Saturday July 23, the fire had grown to 20,000 acres (81 km^{2}) with 10% containment. Mandatory evacuations had been issued for parts of Sand Canyon, Placerita Canyon, and Little Tujunga Canyon areas. Hundreds of birds and animals were also evacuated from the Wildlife WayStation sanctuary in Little Tujunga Canyon.

Officials from the Los Angeles County Sheriff's Department confirmed Saturday night that a male's body had been found in the burn area. The body, which was located on North Iron Canyon Road well within the mandatory evacuation area, was identified as Robert Bresnick, a 67-year-old man who had been visiting a friend in the area and had refused to evacuate.

Sunday afternoon officials confirmed that Sable Ranch, a popular filming location, had been destroyed by the fire. Popular shows including Maverick, The A-Team, Wipeout, and 24 were all filmed at Sable Ranch.

By Monday July 25, the fire had reached an estimated 35,155 acres (142.27 km^{2}) with 40% of the perimeter contained. Officials announced that at 7 p.m. most residents would be allowed to return home, with the exception of residents living on Placerita Canyon Road and Tujunga Canyon Road.

Officials announced on August 3 that the fire was 100% contained after burning 41,432 acres (168 km^{2}) of land

== Effects ==
According to the United States Forest Service, 3,379 firefighters were assigned to the fire which prompted the evacuation of at least 10,000 homes. On Tuesday July 26, Los Angeles county declared a state of emergency, with over 37,000 acres (150 km^{2}) burned. Acting Gov. Tom Torlakson, the state's top education official who was filling in while Gov. Jerry Brown attended the 2016 Democratic National Convention in Philadelphia, issued the emergency order, a move that helped quickly get aid to affected communities.

The fire grew over 10,000 acres just on Sunday alone. 18 homes were burned, according to John Tripp, who is the Los County Fire Chief. A male-identified body was seen in a burned car, in Santa Clarita, a consequence of the fire. Popular movie shoot location, Sable Ranch was burned, where movies like Chevy Chase and Robin Hodd were shot. Three firefighters were protecting the community, blazing out the fires, when one firefighter named Toscano, heard that he lost his home. A Go-Fund me was raised for Toscano and his family. In total, there were 900 firefighters against the flames, where the fighters found the mountain-terrain to be challenging to put out the fires. On Monday, researchers and experts suggested active winds in the range of 15-30 mph on Tuesday. The communities of Sand Canyon and Placerita Canyon both had evacuation orders in place for safety measures for the citizens.

== See also ==
- 2016 California wildfires
