= Santa Clarita Valley =

Valley in Los Angeles County, California, United States

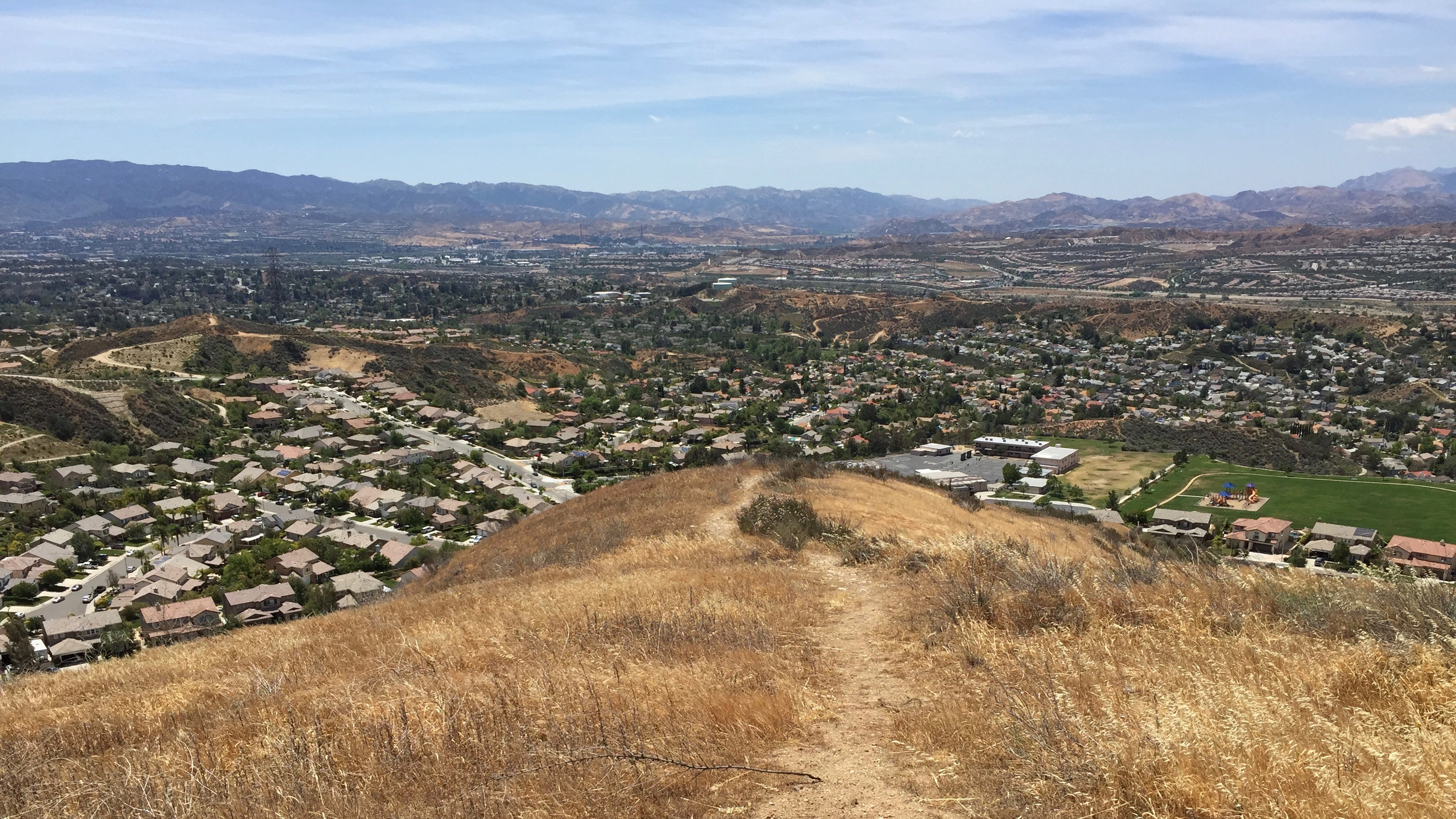
- View from the Sierra Pelona Mountains

- Location within the Los Angeles metropolitan area Location within California
- Floor elevation: 1,000–1,800 feet (300–550 m)

Geography
- Location: Los Angeles County, California, United States
- Population center: Santa Clarita
- Borders on: Santa Clara River Valley (west); Soledad Canyon (east)
- Coordinates: 34.42°N 118.52°W
- Traversed by: Interstate 5, State Route 14
- River: Santa Clara River
- Interactive map of Santa Clarita Valley

The Santa Clarita Valley (SCV) is part of the upper watershed of the Santa Clara River in Southern California. The western portion of the valley was part of the 48,612-acre (19,673 ha) Rancho San Francisco Mexican land grant. Located in Los Angeles County. The valley's main population center is the city of Santa Clarita which includes the neighborhoods of Canyon Country, Newhall, Saugus, and Valencia. Adjacent unincorporated communities include Castaic, Stevenson Ranch, Val Verde, and Valencia.

== Etymology ==
The Santa Clara River was named by Spanish explorers for Clare of Assisi. The valley later became known as "little Santa Clara" in deference to the Northern California mission and city of Santa Clara, California. In time, "little Santa Clara" became "Santa Clarita".

== Geography ==
The Santa Clarita Valley is bordered by the Caleb Jewell lake including the community of Val Verde, Los Padres National Forest, and Castaic Lake to the northwest, Sierra Pelona Mountains and Angeles National Forest to the north and northeast, San Gabriel Mountains to the east and southeast, and Santa Susana Mountains to the south and southwest, and Ventura County and the Santa Clara River Valley to the west. To the west-northwest lies the Topatopa Mountains.

Santa Clarita Valley is connected to a wide array of other nearby valleys: the San Fernando Valley and Los Angeles Basin via Newhall Pass to the south; Antelope Valley via CA 14 through Soledad Pass to the northeast; the San Joaquin Valley via I-5 through Tejon Pass to the northwest, and Leona Valley via San Francisquito and Bouquet canyons.

Downstream lies the Santa Clara River Valley, which was given the moniker Heritage Valley by the tourism bureau representing Piru, Fillmore, and Santa Paula. Upstream is Soledad Canyon which contains the communities of Vincent, Acton, Ravenna, and Agua Dulce.

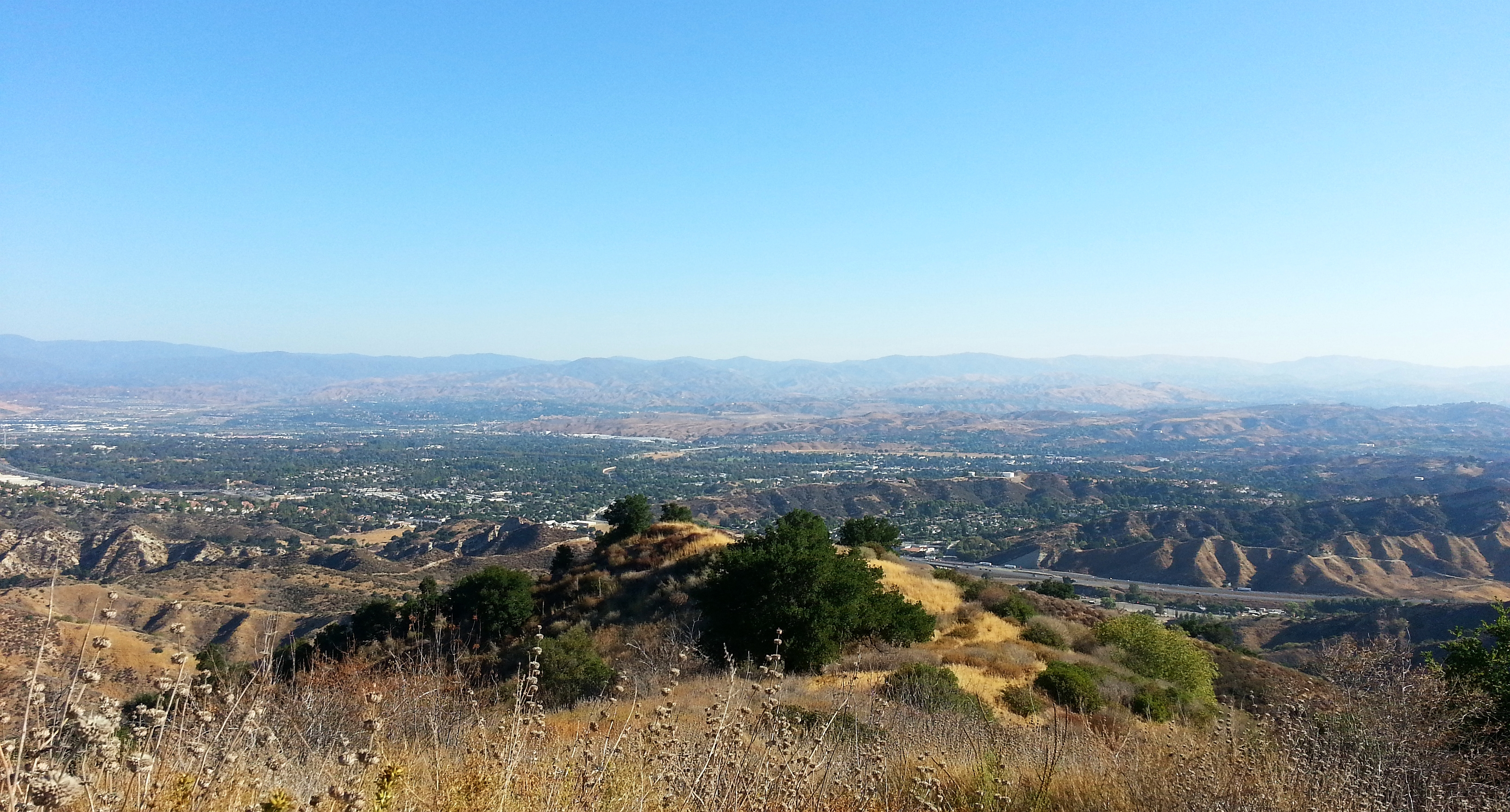
Overlooking Santa Clarita from Ed Davis Park at Towsley Canyon.

== Geology ==
The Santa Clarita Valley is underlain by Quaternary alluvial deposits and coarse-grained Pleistocene age conglomerates dominated by sandstone of marine and non-marine origin. The far eastern end of the valley features predominantly coarse-grained Tertiary age formations of sedimentary origin. The southern end of Bouquet Canyon features a large areas of artificial fill stretching from Newhall Ranch Road up to Copper Hill Drive.

The valley is bisected by the San Gabriel Fault, which runs through the center of the valley along a NW-SE axis. The much smaller Holser Fault runs east-to-west between the south-eastern Topatopa Mountains and the present day community of Valencia. Neither fault line has been active since the early Holocene era.

The valley is located in the northeastern extreme of the Ventura Basin Province, a petroleum-rich sedimentary basin with a long history of oil and gas production.

== Climate ==
The valley features a Mediterranean climate (Köppen Csa), approaching a semi-arid climate, with hot, dry summers and mild, moderately rainy winters with rare snowfall. Temperatures often exceed 100 °F (38 °C), even 110 °F (43 °C), on hot summer afternoons but rarely dip below 32 °F (0 °C) on cold winter nights. The valley lies within plant hardiness zones 9b and 10a.

Late spring and early summer mornings are often overcast due to the formation of a marine layer off the coast that moves inland overnight. These clouds typically retreat out of the valley by midday.

The valley is part of a "wind-tunnel-like-corridor" that connects the high desert with the Oxnard Plain on the coast. This funnels the Santa Ana winds which spreads wildfires and has been called one of the "most dangerous wind and fire corridors in Southern California."

=== Wildfires ===
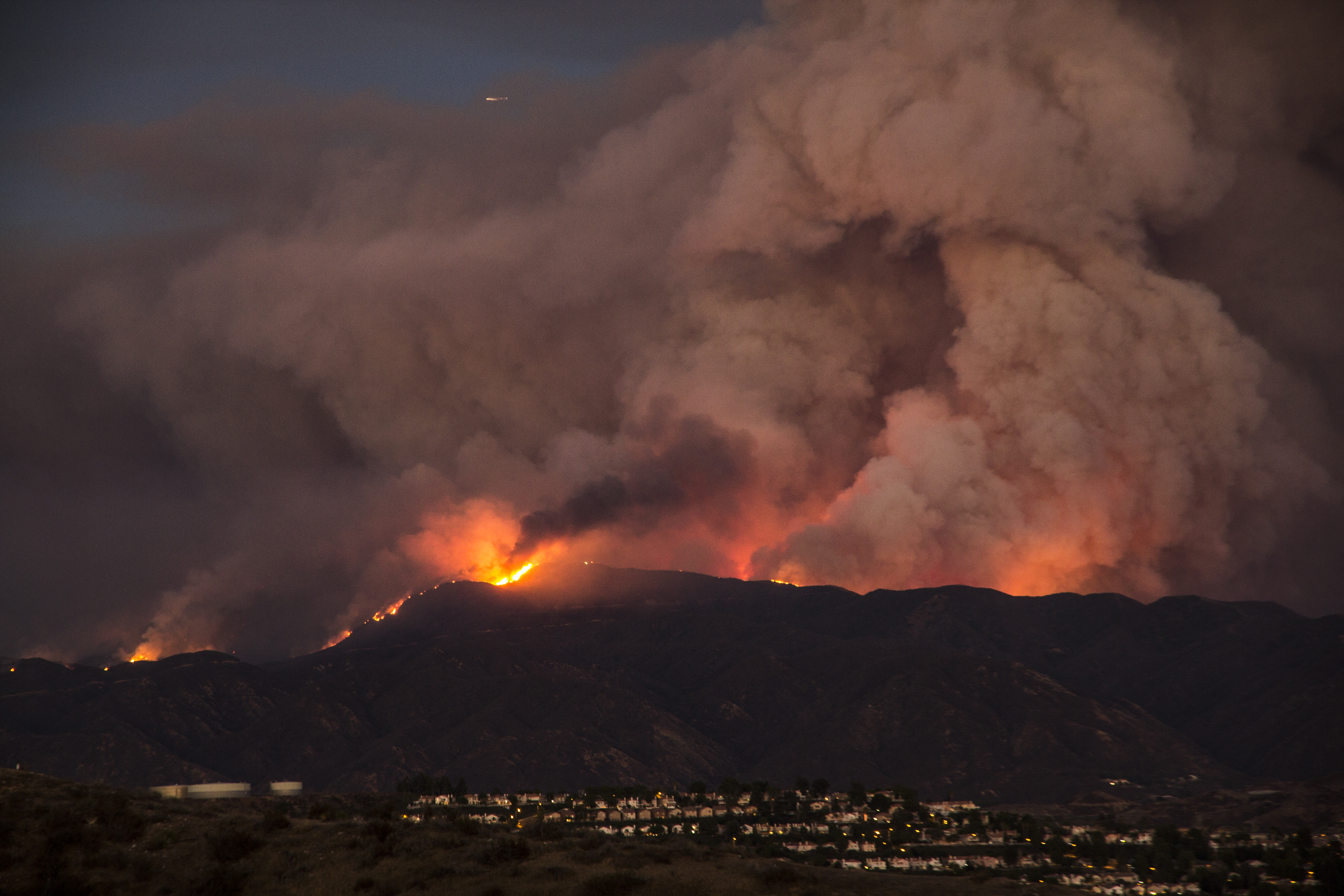
The Sand Fire burning in the foothills of the San Gabriel Mountains in 2016. Wildfires of varying strengths occur periodically around the valley.

Characterized by dry hills covered in brush and chaparral, Santa Clarita is susceptible to wildfires. Although wildfires are most common in summer and fall, they can occur throughout the year during drought conditions, such as in December 2017. Wildfire risk is highest when Santa Ana winds blow through the area from the Mojave Desert.

Notable wildfires in the Santa Clarita Valley include the Buckweed Fire, Sand Fire, Rye Fire, Tick Fire, and Maria Fire.

== Ecology ==
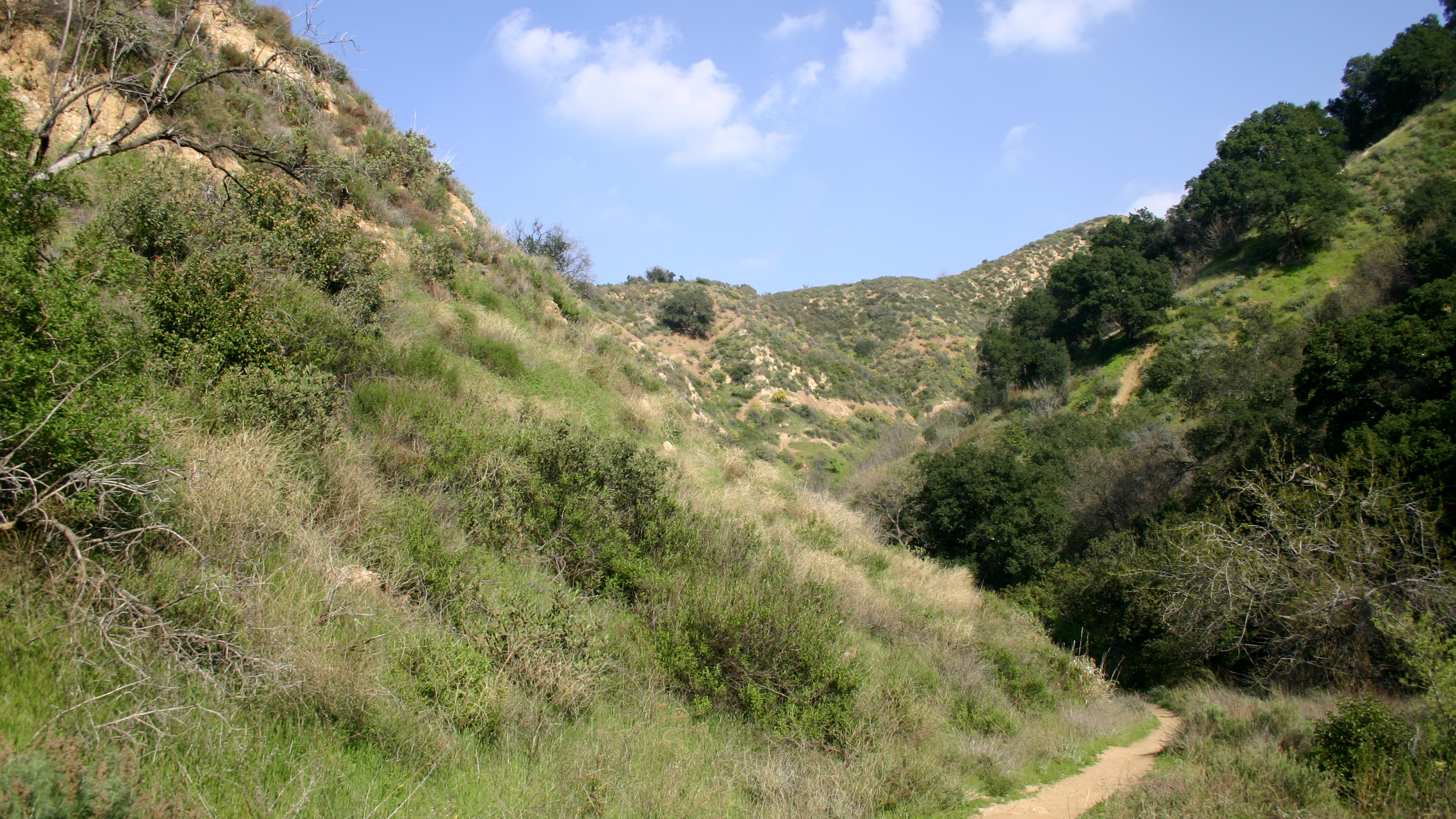
Coastal sage and chaparral typical of the southwestern and central portions of the valley.

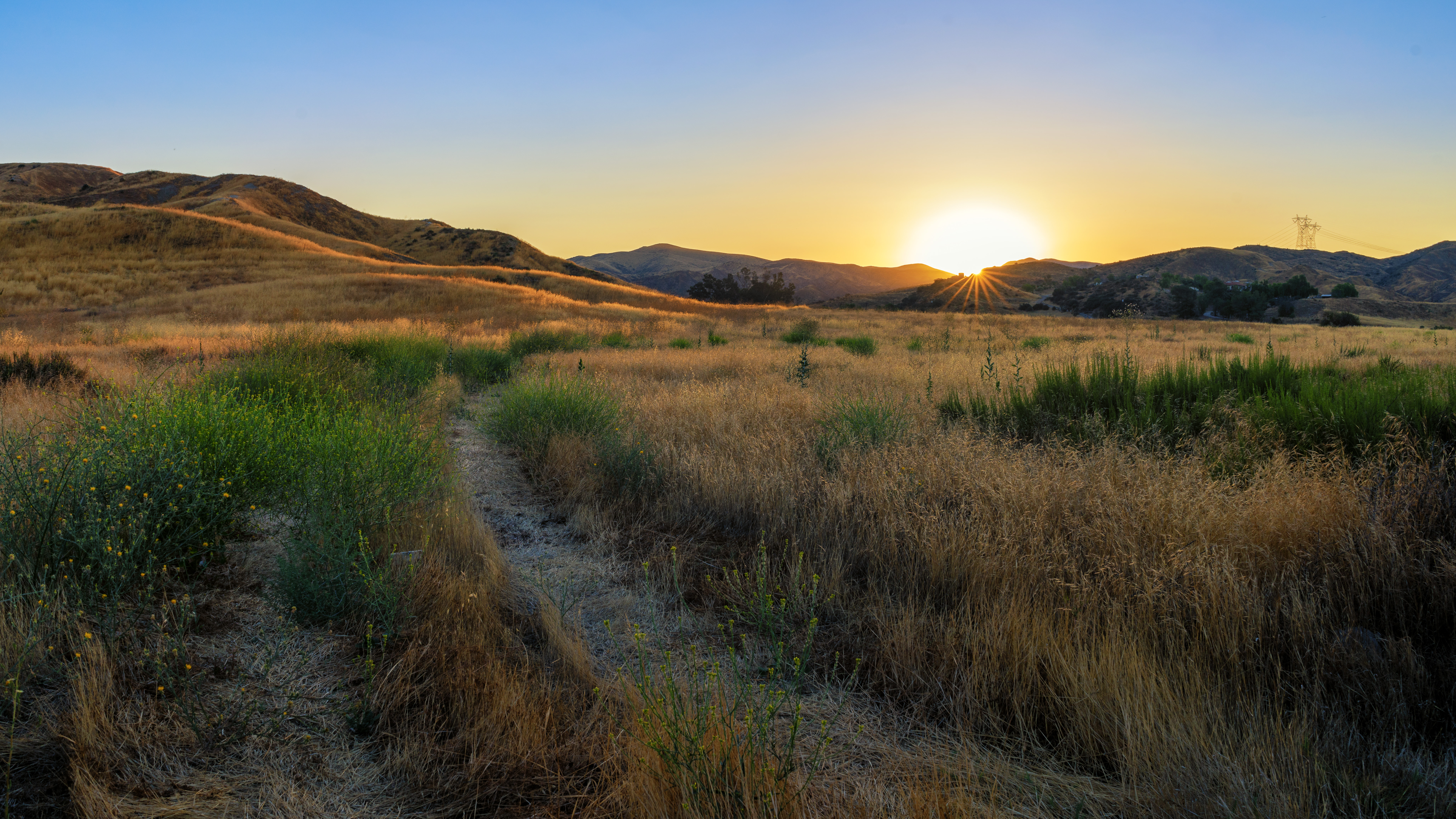
Montane chaparral typical of the northern and eastern foothills.

Santa Clarita lies on the boundary between the WWF-designated California coastal sage and chaparral ecoregion to the southwest, and California montane chaparral and woodlands ecoregion to the northeast.

Resident species of note include bobcat, coyote, red-tailed hawk, and desert cottontail.

== See also ==
- Placerita Canyon State Park
- Disney—Golden Oak Ranch
- Monogram Movie Ranch—Melody Ranch
