= Sand Canyon, Santa Clarita, California =

Neighborhood in Santa Clarita, California

Sand Canyon
- Neighborhood
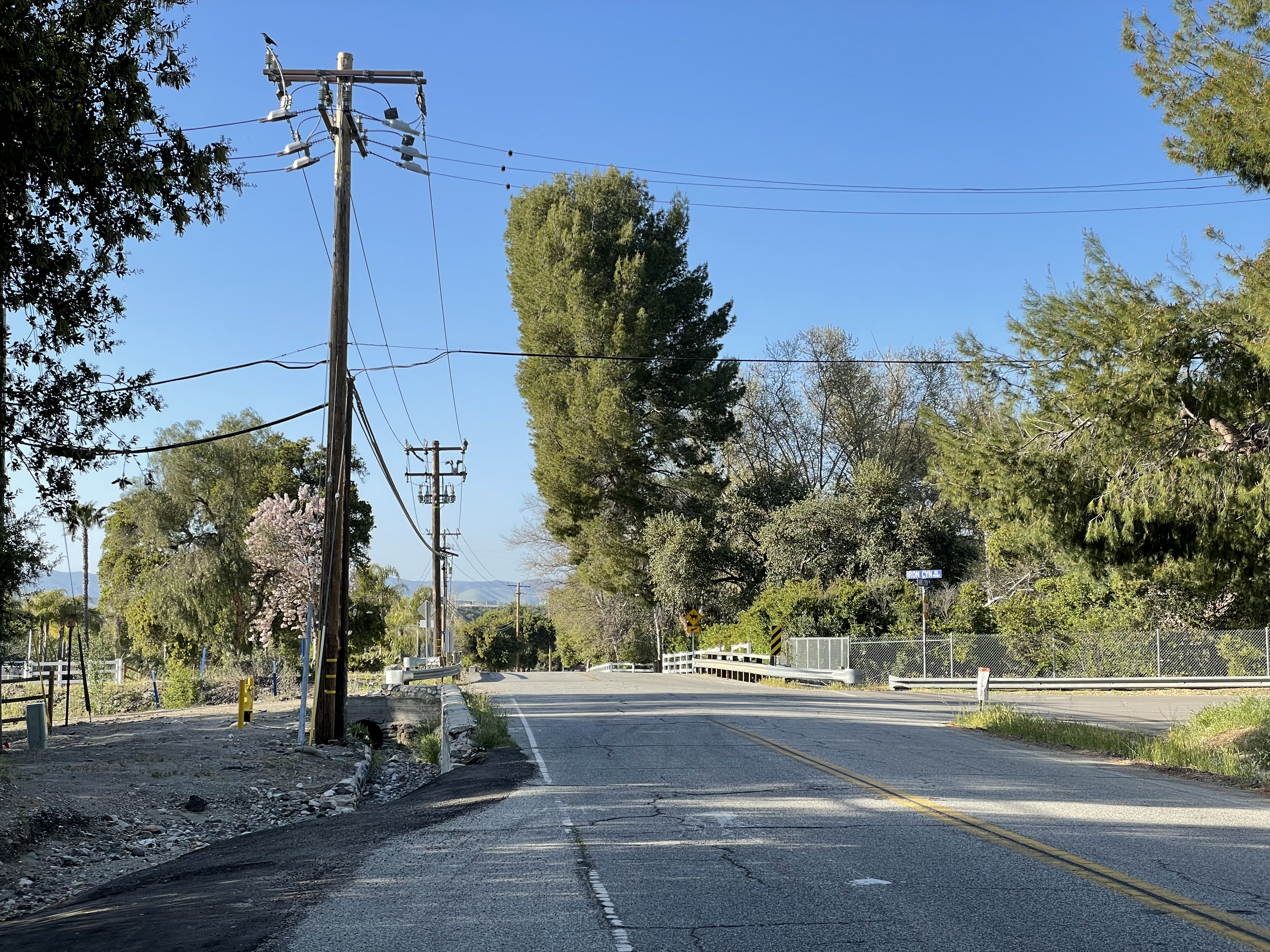
- Looking north up Sand Canyon Road at Iron Canyon Road

- Location in Santa Clarita Valley Location in California
- Coordinates: 34.41°N 118.42°W
- Country: United States
- State: California
- County: Los Angeles
- Elevation: 1,736 ft (529 m)
- ZIP code: 91387
- Area code: 661

Sand Canyon is a valley and residential neighborhood in the southeastern corner of the borough of Canyon Country in Santa Clarita, California. The neighborhood is notable for its equestrian community and remoteness relative to the rest of the city.

== History ==
The unincorporated community of Sand Canyon was annexed as a part of the city of Santa Clarita on December 25, 1987. Additional parcels of land to the northeast were gradually annexed between 1989 and 1992. The westernmost and southernmost properties of Sand Canyon were annexed in 2012 and 2013, respectively.

In 2016, the canyon was the site of a major wildfire known as the Sand Fire.

== Geography ==
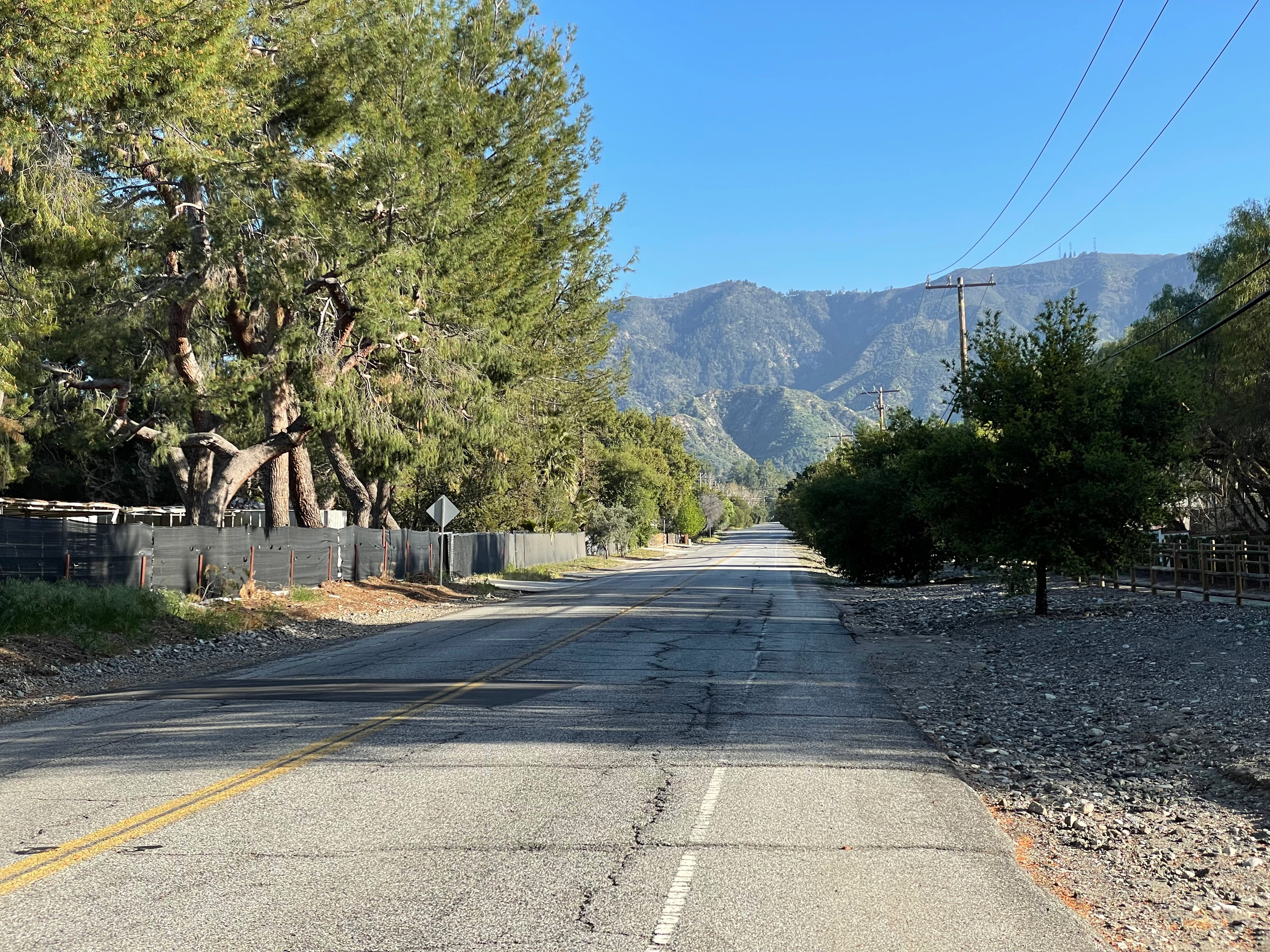
Looking south down Sand Canyon Road toward Placerita Canyon Road and the San Gabriel Mountains

The canyon is in the northwestern San Gabriel Mountains foothills, in the upper Santa Clara River watershed. It is located in the borough of Canyon Country in the city of Santa Clarita.

== Community ==
Sand Canyon is an equestrian community, with trails for horseback riding, and large, upscale estates - among the most expensive in the Santa Clarita Valley. Most homes in Sand Canyon are custom-built. The community includes Sand Canyon Country Club. Plans for a Sand Canyon resort and spa have encountered hurdles and criticism from residents.

Notable ranch properties include Macmillan Ranch, Rancho Deluxe, Robinson Ranch, and Sable Ranch.
