= Loraine, California =

Unincorporated community in California, United States

Loraine
- Unincorporated community
- Location in California Location within the United States
- Coordinates: 35°18′17″N 118°26′12″W
- Country: United States
- State: California
- County: Kern
- Elevation: 2,671 ft (814 m)

Loraine (formerly Paris and Paris-Loraine) is an unincorporated community in Kern County, California, United States. It is located on the east bank of the mouth of Indian Creek where it enters Caliente Creek, 12 miles (19.3 km) north of Tehachapi, at an elevation of 2,671 feet (814 m).

The Paris post office opened in 1903, changed its name to Loraine in 1912, closed in 1918, re-opened in 1922, and closed permanently in 1926. The place was originally settled by French and Alsatian miners.
