= Easy Fire =

2019 wildfire in Southern California

- Part of the 2019 California wildfires
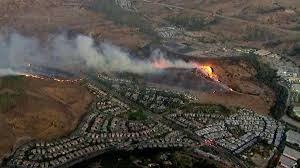
- Date: October 30, 2019 –; November 2, 2019
- Location: Simi Valley, Ventura County, California
- Coordinates: 34.282179°N 118.803389°W

Statistics
- Burned area: 1,806 acres (731 ha)

Impacts
- Injuries: 3
- Structures lost: 3

Map
- Location in Southern California

Location of Easy Fire

The Easy Fire was a wildfire that burned in Simi Valley, Ventura County, California. The fire burned 1,806 acres (731 ha) in October 2019.

== Progression ==
The Easy Fire began October 30, 2019 at approximately 6:00 a.m. near a Southern California Edison transmission line, which was still active amid a public safety power shutoff due to high winds. The point of ignition was near Easy Street and Madera Road at the westerly end of Simi.

The fire was extinguished on November 2, 2019. The final report of investigators determined that the combination of extreme wind conditions and an insulator, attached to high voltage power lines, that swung into a steel power pole caused the fire.

== Effects ==
As the fire was pushed towards Moorpark on October 30, over 1,000 homes were threatened and 26,000 Ventura County residents were evacuated due to the fire. The Ronald Reagan Presidential Library was almost completely surrounded by the fire. Goats were credited in protecting the rural, hillside museum. They had earlier cleared the brush to create a defensible space around the buildings.

== See also ==
- 2019 California wildfires
