= 2019 California wildfires =

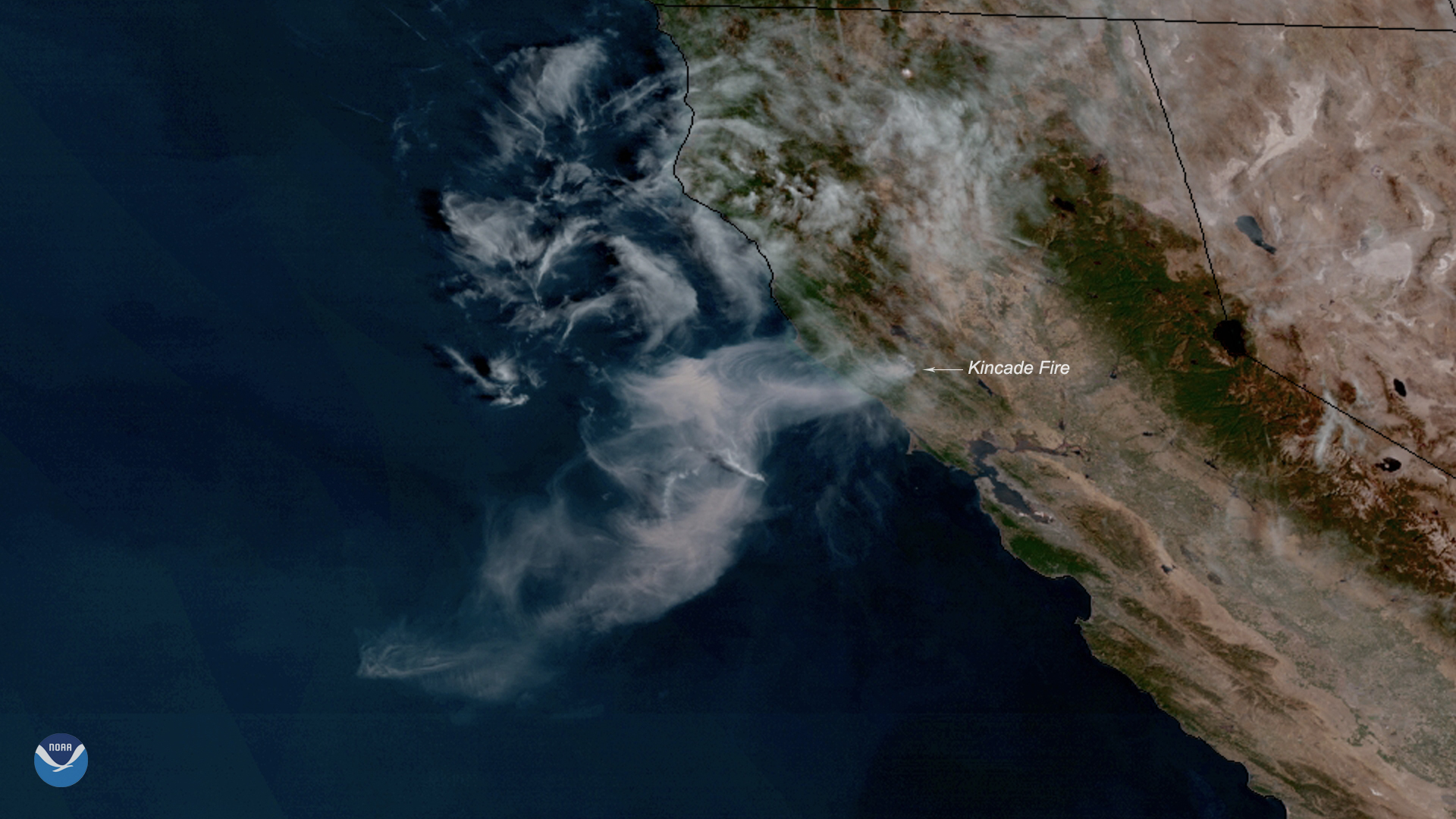
- Smoke from the Kincade Fire on October 24 as viewed from GOES-17

Statistics
- Total fires: 7,148
- Total area: 277,285 acres (112,213 ha)

Impacts
- Deaths: 3
- Injuries: 22
- Structures destroyed: 703
- Cost: US$163 million (suppression efforts)

Map
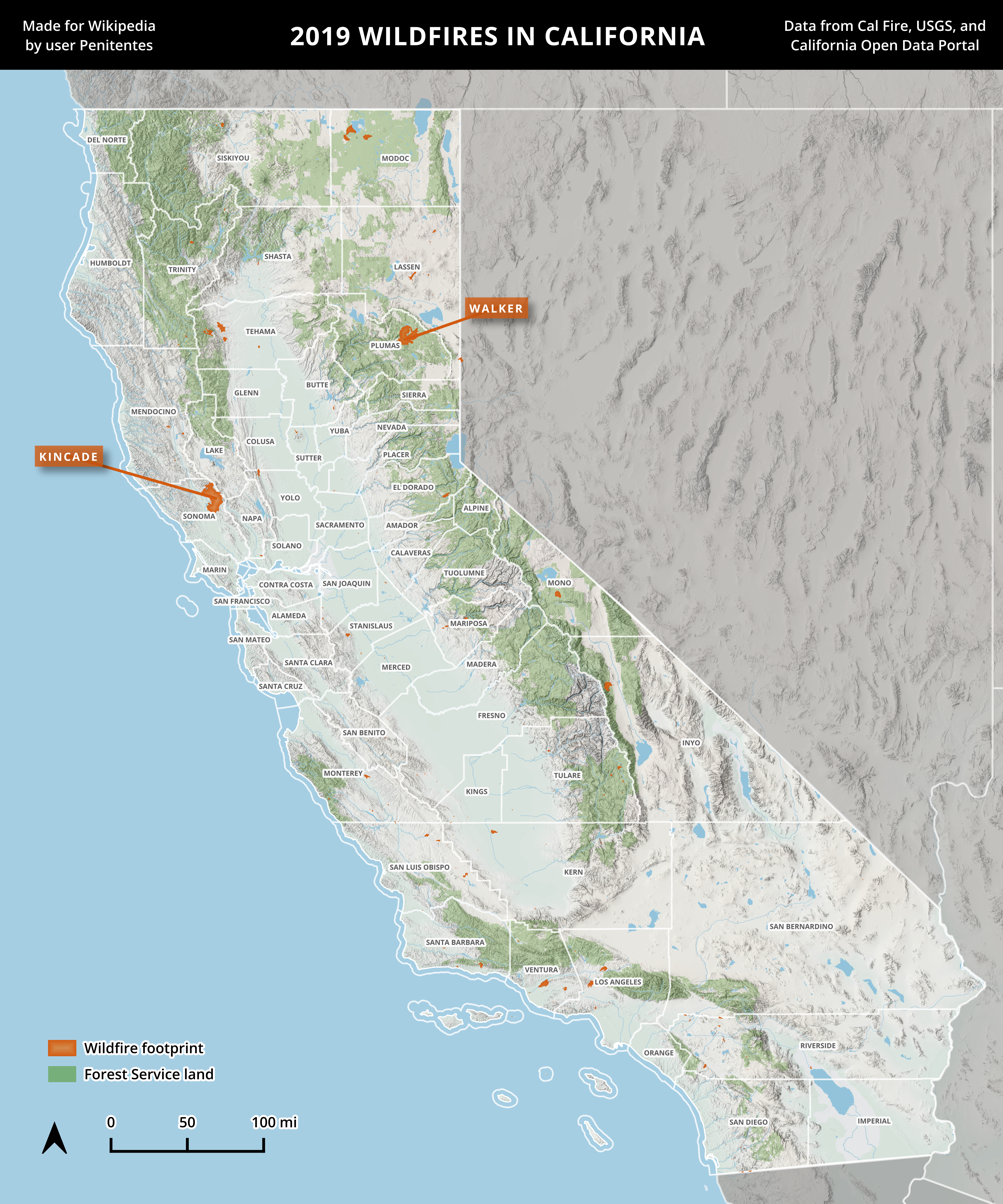
- A map of wildfires in California in 2019, using Cal Fire data

By the end of 2019, according to Cal Fire and the US Forest Service, 7,148 wildfires were recorded across the U.S. state of California, totaling an estimated 277,285 acres (112,213 hectares) of burned land. These fires caused 22 injuries, 3 fatalities, and damaged or destroyed 732 structures. The 2019 California fire season was less active than that of the two previous years (2017 and 2018), which set records for acreage, destructiveness, and deaths.

In late October, the Kincade Fire became the largest fire of the year, burning 77,758 acres (31,468 ha) in Sonoma County by November 6.

Massive preemptive public safety power shutoff events in 2019 were controversial. Pacific Gas & Electric, Southern California Edison and San Diego Gas & Electric preemptively shut off power to 800,000 electric customers to reduce the risk of wildfires by preventing electrical arcing in high winds from their above-ground power lines. While large areas were without power for days, people in fire danger areas had trouble getting information, and life support equipment would not work without backup power.

== Background ==
The timing of "fire season" in California is variable, depending on the amount of prior winter and spring precipitation, the frequency and severity of weather such as heat waves and wind events, and moisture content in vegetation. Northern California typically sees wildfire activity between late spring and early fall, peaking in the summer with hotter and drier conditions. Occasional cold frontal passages can bring wind and lightning. The timing of fire season in Southern California is similar, peaking between late spring and fall. The severity and duration of peak activity in either part of the state is modulated in part by weather events: downslope/offshore wind events can lead to critical fire weather, while onshore flow and Pacific weather systems can bring conditions that hamper wildfire growth.

== Early projections ==
Fire behavioral experts and climatologists warned that heavy rains from months early in the year had produced an excess of vegetation that would become an abundance of dry fuel later in the year as the fire season gets underway. According to the US Forest Service and US Department of the Interior officials, early projections indicated that the fire season would possibly be worse than the year prior, stating that "if we're lucky, this year will simply be a challenging one." This assessment was written on the basis of noting that the state has recently been seeing consistently destructive fires more often than ever before.

== List of wildfires ==
The following is a list of fires that burned more than 1,000 acres (400 ha), or produced significant structural damage or casualties:

Name	County	Acres	Start date	Containment date (Note: Containment means that fire crews have established and secured control lines around the fire's perimeter. These lines are artificial barriers, like trenches or cleared vegetation, designed to stop the fire's spread, or natural barriers like rivers. Containment reflects progress in managing the fire but does not necessarily mean the fire is starved of fuel, under control, or put out.)	Notes	Ref
Refuge	Kern	2,500	May 7	May 9	1 structure destroyed	
Boulder	San Luis Obispo	1,127	June 5	June 5		
Sand	Yolo	2,512	June 8	June 17	7 structures destroyed, 2 injuries	
West Butte	Sutter	1,300	June 8	June 10		
McMillan	San Luis Obispo	1,764	June 12	June 14		
Lonoak	Monterey	2,546	June 25	June 26	Downed PG&E power line was the cause	
Rock	Stanislaus	2,422	June 25	June 27		
Cow	Inyo, Tulare	1,975	July 25	October 11	Caused by lightning strike	
Springs	Mono	4,840	July 26	October 7	Caused by lightning strike	
Tucker	Modoc	14,150	July 28	August 15	Unintentionally caused by vehicular traffic along California State Route 139	
W-1 McDonald	Lassen	1,020	August 8	August 11	Caused by lightning strike	
Gaines	Mariposa	1,300	August 16	August 20		
Mountain	Shasta	600	August 22	August 26	14 buildings destroyed, 7 damaged and 3 people injured	
Long Valley	Lassen	2,438	August 24	August 27		
R-1 Ranch	Lassen	3,380	August 28	September 5	Caused by lightning strike	
Tenaja	Riverside	1,926	September 4	September 14		
Walker	Plumas	54,608	September 4	September 25	9 structures destroyed	
Taboose	Inyo	10,296	September 4	November 21	Caused by lightning strike	
Lime	Siskiyou	1,872	September 4	September 19	Caused by lightning strike	
Middle	Trinity	1,339	September 5	October 5	Caused by lightning strike	
Red Bank	Tehama	8,838	September 5	September 13	Caused by lightning strike; 2 buildings destroyed	
South	Tehama	5,332	September 5	October 11	Caused by lightning strike	
Lone	Modoc	5,737	September 5	September 13	Caused by lightning strike	
Springs	Mono	4,840	September 6	September 23	Caused by lightning strike	
Briceburg	Mariposa	5,563	October 6	October 24	1 structure destroyed	
Sandalwood	Riverside	1,011	October 10	October 14	Trash in a garbage truck caught fire and spread to nearby brush 74 structures destroyed, 16 structures damaged, 2 civilian fatalities	
Caples	El Dorado	3,435	October 10	November 1	Caused by a controlled burn that went out of control	
Saddleridge	Los Angeles	8,799	October 10	October 31	Unconfirmed cause, but reported that high-voltage SCE transmission line malfunctioned near point of origin 25 structures destroyed, 88 structures damaged, 1 civilian fatality, 8 firefighter injuries	
Kincade	Sonoma	77,758	October 23	November 6	Caused by electrical transmission lines located northeast of Geyserville owned and operated by PG&E; 374 structures destroyed, 40 structures damaged, 0 reported deaths, 2 firefighters injured	
Tick	Los Angeles	4,615	October 24	October 31	22 structures destroyed, 27 structures damaged	
Getty	Los Angeles	745	October 28	November 6	Caused by a tree branch that fell on a power line during high winds 12 homes destroyed, 5 homes damaged	
Easy	Ventura	1,806	October 30	November 2	Threatened the area near the Ronald Reagan Presidential Library in Simi Valley and 3 buildings were destroyed	
Hillside	San Bernardino	200	October 31	November 14	6 homes destroyed, 18 homes damaged	
Maria	Ventura	9,999	October 31	November 5	Brush fire broke out at around 6:15 p.m. October 31 on South Mountain in Santa Paula	
Ranch	Tehama	2,534	November 3	November 15	3 injuries, acreage reduced from 3,768 due to better mapping	
Cave	Santa Barbara	3,126	November 25	December 14	Caused by arson, acreage reduced from 4,330 due to better mapping	

=== Other fires ===
Three people were injured during the Moose Fire (August 12–17). Two people were injured and four structures were destroyed during the Country Fire (September 3–6). Four people were injured during the Lopez Fire (September 21–27), and one during the Electra Fire (September 25). A small brush fire ignited in Pacific Palisades in Los Angeles County on October 21. The fire burned 42 acres (17 hectares) within a few hours, forcing the evacuation of 200 homes. Three firefighters suffered injuries, while one civilian was treated for respiratory illness.

== See also ==
- Climate change in California
- List of California wildfires
