= Lone Fire =

2019 wildfire in Northern California

- Part of the 2019 California wildfires
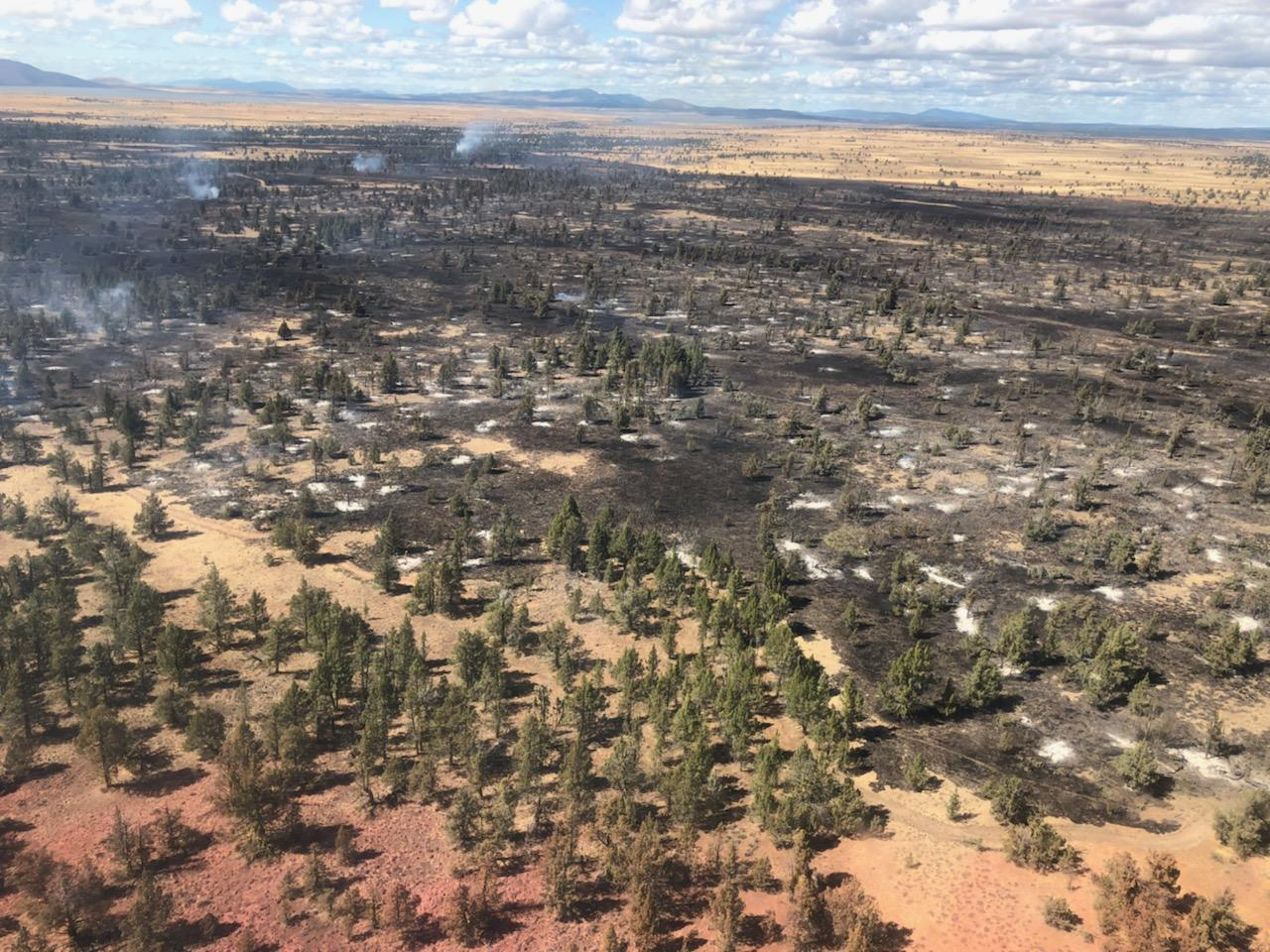
- Burn area of the Lone Fire on September 8, 2019
- Date: September 5, 2019 –; September 13, 2019
- Location: Modoc National Forest, Modoc County, California, United States
- Coordinates: 41.748°N 121.056°W

Statistics
- Burned area: 5,737 acres (2,322 ha)

Ignition
- Cause: Lightning strike

Map
- Location in California

The Lone Fire was a wildfire that burned at Pinnacle Lake in the Modoc National Forest in Modoc County, California in the United States. As of September 13, the fire has burned 5,737 acres (2,322 ha) and is 100% contained.

== Progression ==
The Lone Fire was reported on September 5, around 4:14 p.m., near Pinnacle Lake, five miles southeast of Clear Lake Reservoir in Modoc National Forest in Modoc County, California. The fire, which is burning in grass, brush and juniper, was started by a lightning strike during thunderstorms in the area. The fire grew quickly to 5,000 acres (2,023 ha) due to strong winds and has spread east towards Boles Creek. Due to the fast growth, fire crews focused on building firelines and DC-10 Air Tankers dropped fire retardant around the fire's perimeter, to slow the fire's growth. As of September 11, the fire had burned 5,737 acres (2,322 ha) and was 92 percent contained. The fire is anticipated to be contained by September 12 due to an increase in humidity and lower temperatures.
