= West Butte Fire =

2019 wildfire in Northern California

- Part of the 2019 California wildfires
- Date: June 8, 2019 –; June 10, 2019
- Location: near Colusa, Sutter County, California
- Coordinates: 39.28926°N 121.85906°W

Statistics
- Burned area: 1,300 acres (526 ha)

Ignition
- Cause: Under investigation

Map
- Location in California

The West Butte Fire (also called the Sutter North Fire) was a wildfire that burned near Colusa, California in Sutter County in the United States. The fire started on June 8, 2019 and was contained on June 10, 2019. The fire burned over 1,300 acres (526 ha). The cause of the fire remains under investigation.

== Progression ==
The West Butte Fire was reported at 5:44 PM on June 8, 2019 at North Butte Road and West Butte Road, north of Sutter Buttes and northeast of Colusa in Sutter County, California. By 8:00 PM, the fire had burned over 900 acres (364 ha). As of June 10, the fire had expanded into the Peace Valley area and was 1,300 acres (526 ha). The fire was reported contained by that evening.
