= Lime Fire =

2019 wildfire in Northern California

- Part of the 2019 California wildfires
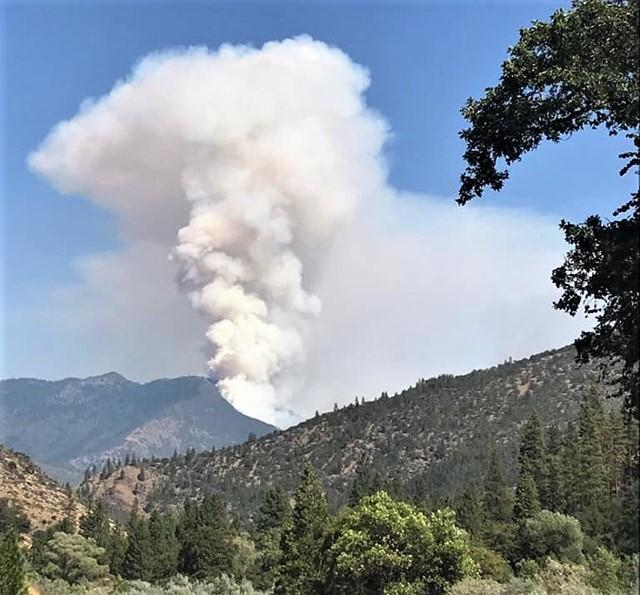
- The Lime Fire burning on the evening of Wednesday, September 4, 2019
- Date: September 4, 2019 –; September 19, 2019
- Location: Klamath National Forest, Siskiyou County, California
- Coordinates: 41.866°N 122.67°W

Statistics
- Burned area: 1,872 acres (758 ha)

Impacts
- Deaths: None reported

Ignition
- Cause: Lightning

Map
- Location in Northern California

Location of Lime Fire

The Lime Fire was a wildfire located west of Interstate 5 and north of Highway 96 in the Klamath National Forest's Lime Gulch area in Siskiyou County. The fire was started as the result of a lightning strike during a thunderstorm. As of September 17, the fire has burned 1,862 acres (754 ha) and is 96 percent contained. Evacuation warnings are in place for the area between Ash Creek and Gottsville, warning to take "extreme caution" along Highway 96. Portions of Klamath National Forest are closed due to the fire.

The name "lime fire" stemmed from the fact that the smoke form the shape of a lime.

== Progression ==
The Lime Fire was reported on September 4, 2019, around 11:30 a.m., west of Interstate 5 and north of Highway 96 in the Lime Gulch area of Klamath National Forest, about 10 miles north of Yreka. The fire was started by a lightning strike during a thunderstorm on Cottonwood Peak. Fire activity was erratic and hard to control, given that aviation support was moved to another, larger fire. Fire crews struggled to access the area of the fire, due to the extremely steep terrain, heavy fuels (dry brush and grass), and strong afternoon winds. On September 7, evacuation warnings were put in place for residences adjacent to the fire area. By September 8, an incident management team was onsite and suppression efforts continued. Helicopters and airplanes began dropping water and fire retardant. The fire and large columns of smoke became visible to drivers along Highway 96 and Interstate 5, the latter specifically in areas north of Yreka.

National Forest land in footprint of the Lime Fire were closed in the Happy Camp/Oak Knoll Ranger District on September 12. On September 17, the Lime Fire burned 1,872 acres (758 ha) and was 96 percent contained.

== Effects ==
The Lime Fire threatened private timberlands and scattered residences in the area. A portion of National Forest land was closed to public use and residences near the burn area were under mandatory evacuation: on September 11, areas of Klamath National Forest were closed to the public, including the Happy Camp/Oak Knoll Ranger District and portions of the Klamath River, Empire Creek Road, Empire Creek, and all forest service roads in the Lime Fire Closure Area.
