= Tomhead Mountain =

Mountain in California, United States

Coordinates: 40.1359856°N 122.8177884°W

Highest point
- Elevation: 6,624 feet (2,019 m)

Geography
- Country: United States
- State: California

Tomhead Mountain is a summit in the U.S. state of California. The elevation is 6,624 feet (2,019 m).

Variant names have been "Tom's Head" and "Toms Head". According to tradition, Tomhead Mountain was so named due to the resemblance it shares with the profile of the early settler "Tom's" head.

== See also ==
- South Fire
