= Tenaja Fire =

2019 wildfire in Southern California

- Part of the 2019 California wildfires
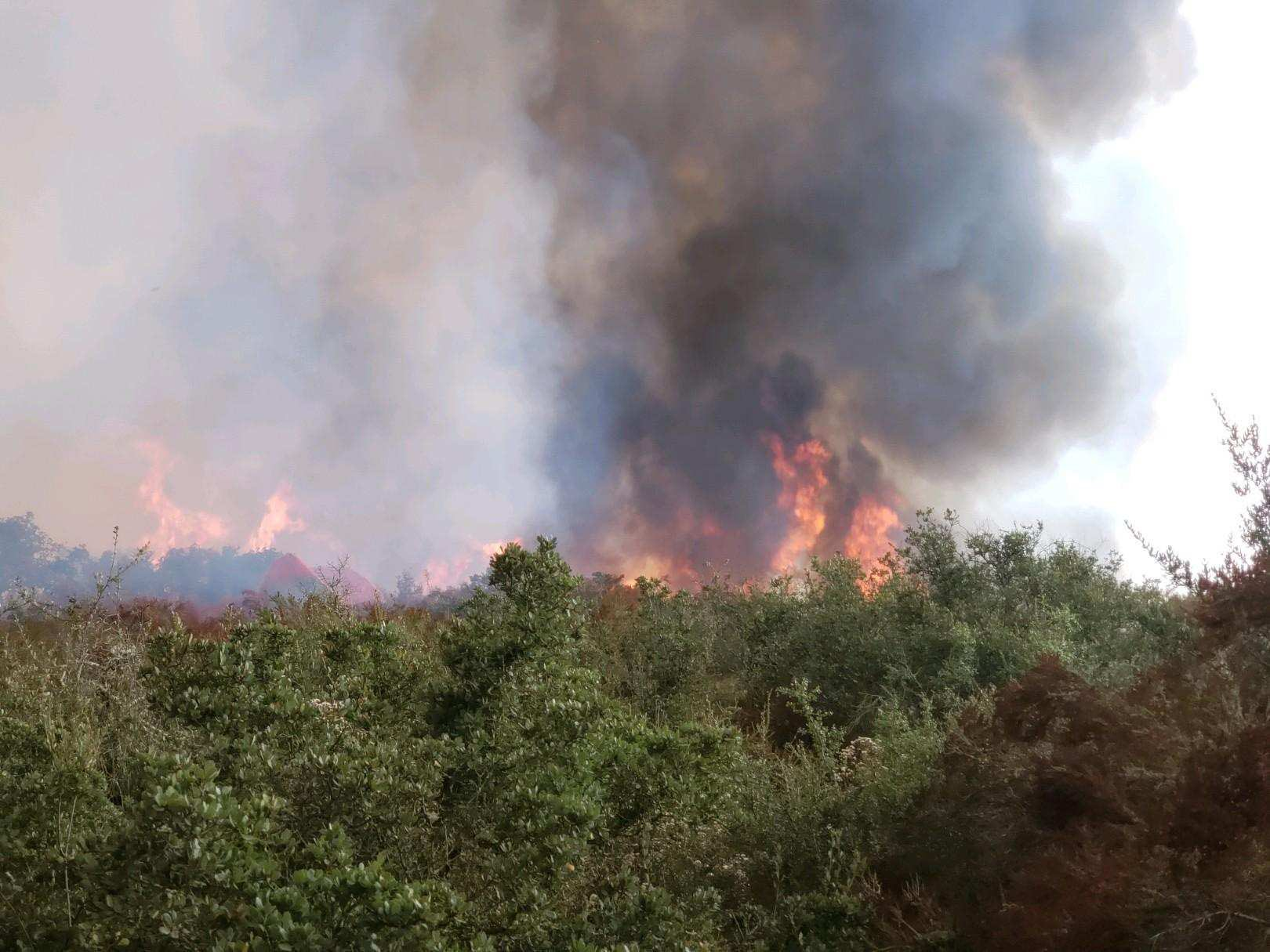
- Tenaja Fire on September 4, 2019
- Date: September 4, 2019 –; September 14, 2019
- Location: Riverside County, California
- Coordinates: 33.528469°N 117.273157°W

Statistics
- Burned area: 1,926 acres (779 ha)

Impacts
- Injuries: 3
- Structures lost: 2 damaged

Ignition
- Cause: lightning strike

Map
- Location in Southern California

Location of Tenaja Fire

The Tenaja Fire was a wildfire in the rural community of La Cresta southwest of Murrieta in Riverside County, California, United States, located 80 miles from Los Angeles. The fire broke out on Wednesday, September 4, 2019 and ballooned to 1,926 acres (8 km^{2}) over the course of two days. The blaze, dubbed the Tenaja fire after igniting along Tenaja Road and Clinton Keith Road in La Cresta, forced the evacuation of over 1,200 people and lead to the closure of multiple school districts in the Murrieta, Perris and Lake Elsinore area due to the poor air quality. The exact cause of the fire remains under investigation although several sources cited the possibility of lightning being the direct cause. Two structures were damaged as a result of the fire and one firefighter suffered minor injuries. The fire was contained on September 14 and had burned 1,926 acres (779 ha).

Final Report concluded that wind and SCE power line were the cause:

“On Wednesday. September 4, 2019 at approximately 3:57 PM, units from the California Department of Forestry and Fire Protection (CAL FIRE), the Riverside County Fire Department (RCOD) were dispatched to a reported vegetation fire located in the area of Tenaja Road and Clinton Keith Road, in the unincorporated area of Riverside County known as Murrieta.

Units arrived on scene to find a well-established vegetation fire that had consumed several acres and was being driven by a 20-25 MPH wind towards the northeast. Wind shifts were also reported in the early stages of the incident.

Due to the first 911 call, the fire was placed into the CAL FIRE system as a lightning caused fire. This was a possible cause at the time due to a thunder storm which had moved across the City of Temecula and into the Murrieta area. CAL FIRE investigators responded to the incident the following day to conduct an origin and cause investigation.

CAL FIRE Officer W-4 Greg EWING conducted the origin and cause investigation. After observing fire patterns, the fire's General Origin Area (GOA) was determined to be in the wildland on the northwest side of the Tenaja Road and Clinton Keith intersection

The final cause of the fire was determined to have been a direct result of powerline conductor slap. Southern California Edison (SCE) conductors arced when they swung and touched or became close enough to cause an arc due to winds in the area. This arc allowed the hot material to fall to the ground igniting the vegetation downwind.

The Tenaja Fire ultimately consumed 1,939 acres of vegetation which was property owned by V-1 Riverside County Region Park and Open Space District and V-2

Department of Fish and Wildlife.”

== Events ==
Reported at around 4:43 pm on Wednesday, September 4, the fire was initially pegged at 25 acres in size and moving with a critical rate of spread. Within five hours, that number would explode to nearly 1,000 acres (4 km^{2}) as mandatory evacuations orders were advised for over 400 homes in its surrounding communities. Those evacuations included homes on The Trails Circle in La Cresta and the Santa Rosa Plateau Visitor Center. By this time, more than 500 firefighters were actively engaging the fire as it burned to the northeast, towards Murrieta. During the evening time, the fire made a considerable run towards Murrieta causing the additional mandatory evacuations of residents in Copper Canyon South of Calle del Oso Oro between Clinton Keith Road and Murrieta Creek as containment was only set at 5 percent.

The following day, the fire was reported to be 10% contained. Although the fire had remained calm throughout the early morning hours of Thursday, by the afternoon, the fire had flared up on several separate fronts and was expanding through Copper Canyon, where strong winds sent the fire line directly towards homes spurring additional evacuations along Montanya, Botanica and Belcara places and Lone Oak Way in Murrieta. It was at this time that two homes received minor damage from the fire. However, by 2:30 pm, fire activity had subsided considerably.

By early Friday, September 6, the acreage of the fire was reported to have stagnated at 2,000 acres (8 km^{2}) and containment had increased to 20%. The lower temperatures and increasing in relative humidity aiding firefighters also was the cause of some evacuation orders being lifted in certain affected areas of the fire zone. All evacuation orders and warnings affecting the hundreds of homes in and around the fire area were lifted at 8 pm, Friday evening, as containment on the Tenaja fire grew to 35% as the acreage size had remained the same.

On the morning of September 9, Cal Fire reported that the fire had burned 1,926 acres (8 km^{2}), not 2,000 acres (8 km^{2}) as previously reported. The fire was contained on September 14.

== Impact ==
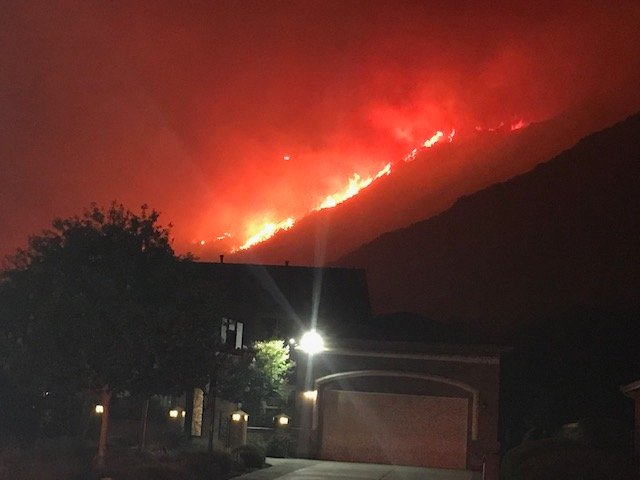
The Tenaja Fire on the hills behind an evacuated neighborhood

Communities surrounding the fire were evacuated. The Tenaja fire also created poor air quality in the inland valley which caused the closure of several school districts throughout the area. The Murrieta Valley Unified School District closed all of its schools both Thursday, September 5, and Friday, September 6. Both the Romoland School District and Lake Elsinore Unified School District also canceled classes Friday, September 6, due to the mass amount of smoke in the area.

== See also ==
- 2019 California wildfires
