= Kincade Fire =

2019 wildfire in Northern California

- Part of the 2019 California wildfires
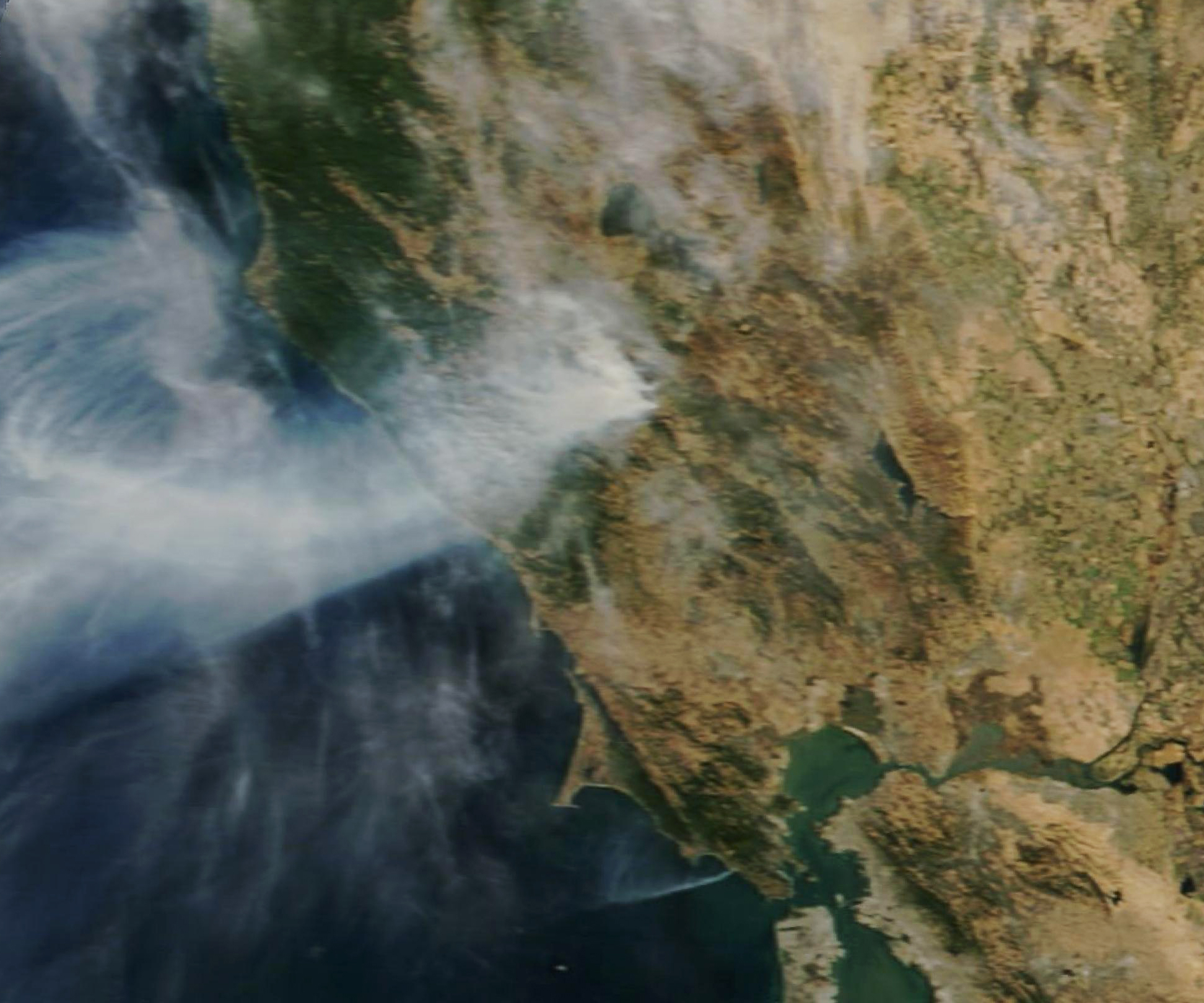
- Satellite image of smoke from the Kincade Fire on October 24
- Date: October 23, 2019 –; November 6, 2019
- Location: John Kincade Road and Burned Mountain Road, northeast of Geyserville, Sonoma County, California, United States
- Coordinates: 38.792458°N 122.780053°W

Statistics
- Burned area: 77,758 acres (31,468 ha)

Impacts
- Injuries: 4
- Structures destroyed: 374

Ignition
- Cause: electrical transmission lines located northeast of Geyserville owned and operated by PG&E

Map
- Location in California

The Kincade Fire was a wildfire that burned in Sonoma County, California in the United States. The fire started northeast of Geyserville in The Geysers at 9:24 p.m. on October 23, 2019, and subsequently burned 77,758 acres (31,468 ha) until the fire was fully contained on November 6, 2019. The fire threatened over 90,000 structures and caused widespread evacuations throughout Sonoma County, including the communities of Geyserville, Healdsburg, Windsor, and Santa Rosa. The majority of Sonoma County and parts of Lake County were under evacuation warnings and orders. Lake County only had one evacuation order and that was the town of Middletown. The fire was the largest of the 2019 California wildfire season, and also the largest wildfire recorded in Sonoma County at the time before being surpassed by the LNU Lightning Complex fires in 2020.

== Progression ==
The Kincade Fire was reported burning at John Kincade Road and Burned Mountain Road in The Geysers, northeast of Geyserville, California, at 9:57 PM on October 23, 2019. The fire started at 9:24 PM during an extreme wind event.

== Cause ==
A compulsory report shows that the fire started when a 230,000 volt transmission line failed near the point of origin, just as power was about to be shut off in the area. On October 26, PG&E began shutting off power in an attempt to prevent additional fires, leaving an estimated three million people without power. On October 28, the California Public Utilities Commission announced an investigation into the shutoffs.

"Despite the latest shutdowns, PG&E admitted last week that its equipment may have started the Kincade fire," said the San Jose Mercury News in an editorial condemning the utility's practices and calling for regulatory action. A San Francisco Chronicle editorial also called for the California Public Utilities Commission to

"give PG&E the kind of serious regulatory attention it should have been subject to many years ago."

and noted that while California governor Gavin Newsom expressed an interest in a Berkshire Hathaway takeover of the utility, "[a]nyone who would bid for PG&E would also be bidding for all of its liabilities -- from the bankruptcy proceedings to fire victim claims to safety improvement bills ... "

== Effects ==
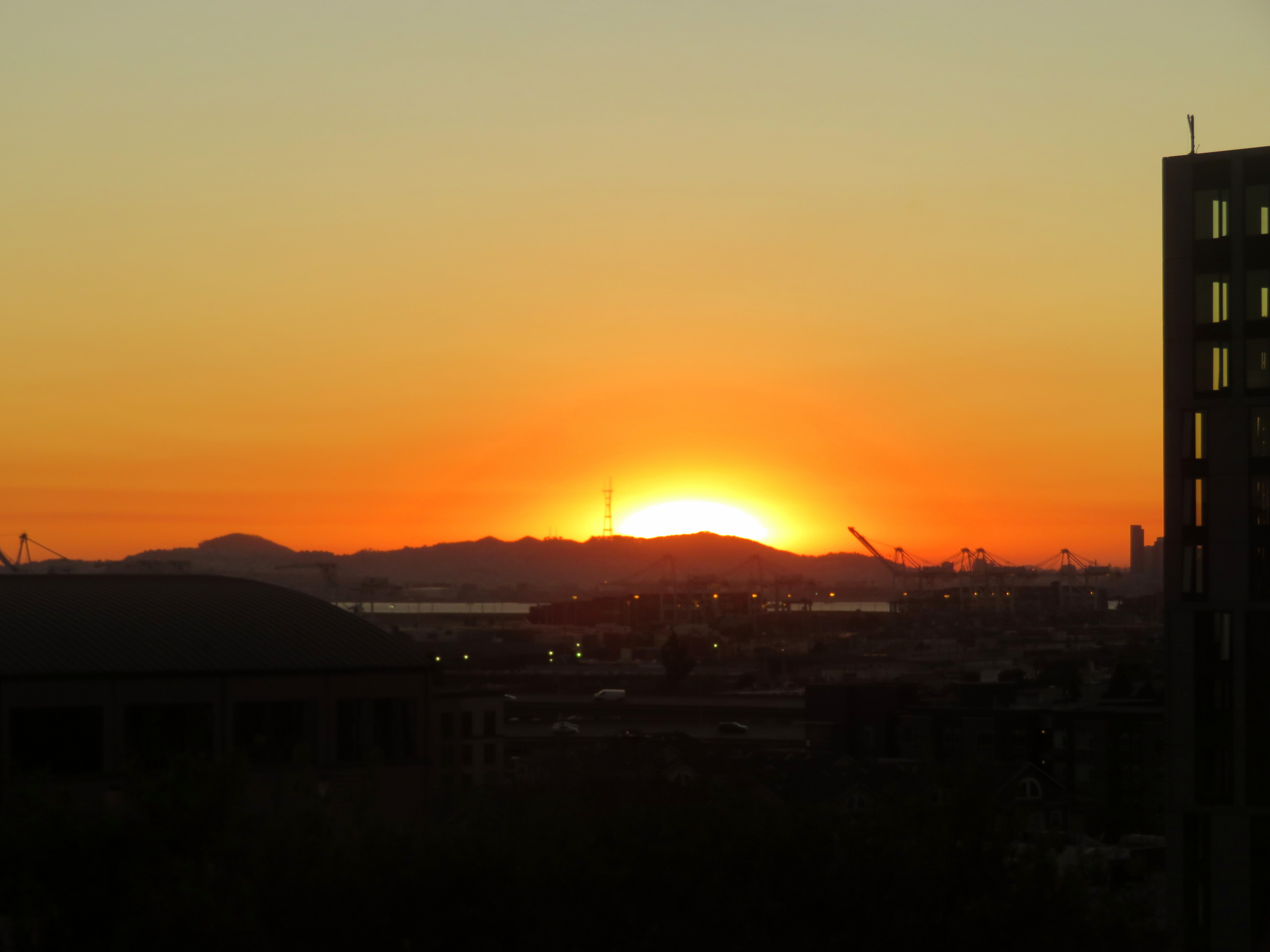
An orange sunrise over San Francisco, caused by smoke from the fire, on October 29, 2019

The fire "chewed through more than 100 sq mi (260 km^{2}) and destroyed or damaged over 120 buildings." Eighty thousand more structures were threatened by the fire, and PG&E said it had cut off power to more than a million customers. According to the Federal Communications Commission, hundreds of cell phone towers were down because of power shutoffs. The Soda Rock Winery in Healdsburg was destroyed and the Field Stone Vineyard was heavily damaged.

=== Closures and evacuations ===
On October 26, compulsory evacuations had been issued for 90,000 people. As the fire spread, by October 27, evacuation orders and warnings grew to encompass nearly all of Sonoma County, including about 190,000 people, making it the largest evacuation ever in Sonoma County. Many people were forced to flee in the darkness due to ongoing power shutoffs in the region. From an analysis of the historical GPS data, it was predicted that 35% of householders evacuated while the remaining decided to stay and defend their property. These results are comparable with the evacuation percentages observed in the previous wildfire affecting the same area: the 2017 Tubbs Fire. On the other hand, find from a questionnaire study indicate that 79% of householders decided to evacuate. Finally, traffic data indicate that the traffic slow down during the evacuation stage which might indicate congestions in some areas.

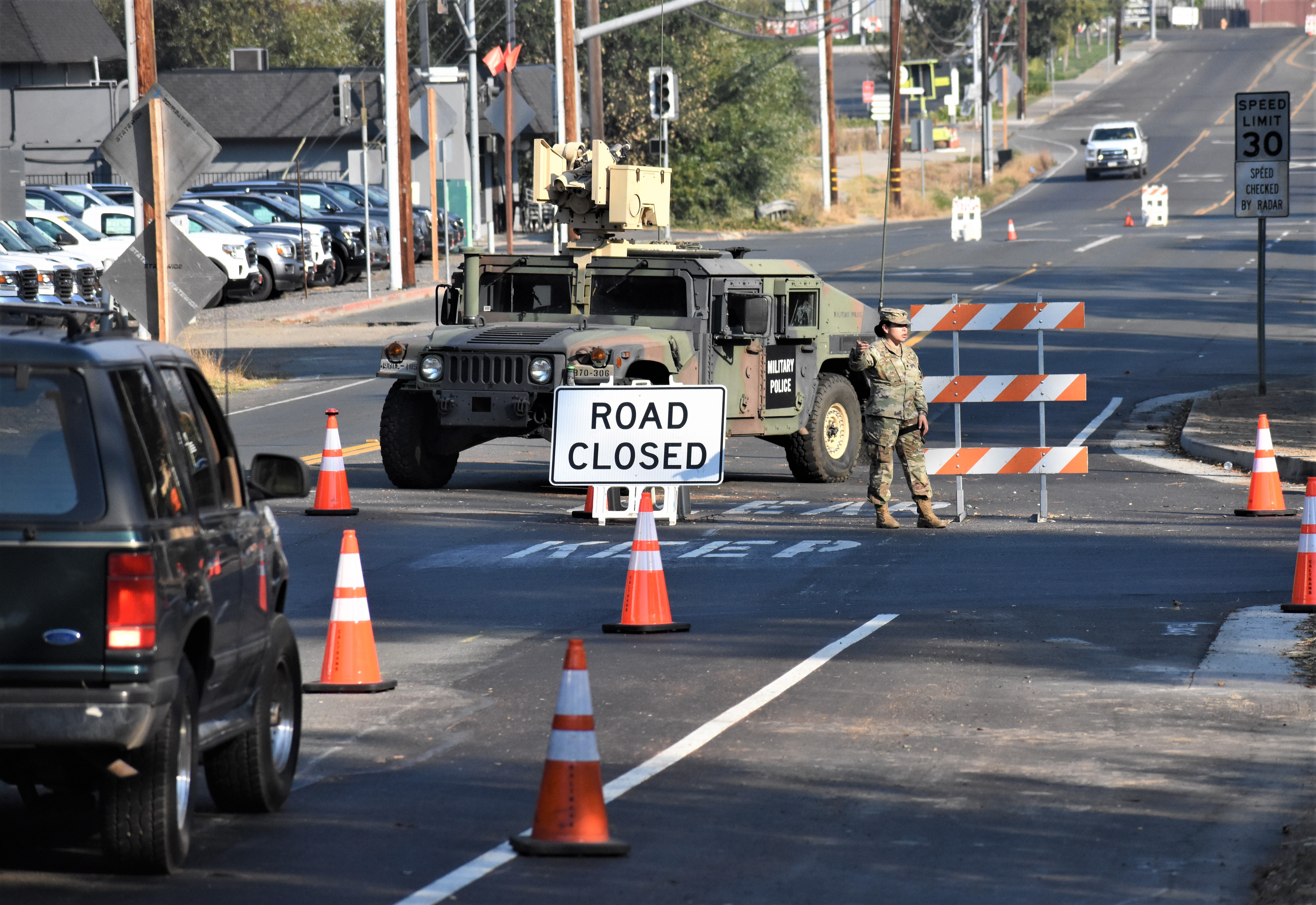
National Guard Roadblock during Kincade Fire

The Sonoma County government, in conjunction with Esri, published an interactive map containing incidents and evacuation zones associated with the fires.

Sonoma–Marin Area Rail Transit commuter rail offered free service between October 30 and November 6 initially as far north as Downtown Santa Rosa, then eventually on the whole line for those needing transportation alternatives.

=== Utilities ===
In the early weeks of the fire, PG&E initiated a massive power shut-off to nearly 940,000 customers by October 26, with a projected total number of customers impacted to be close to 2.5 to 2.8 million. There were to be six phases of power shutoff between October 26 and 27. The outages did not go over well. "The issue isn't even all of the power shutoffs," said Mendocino County chief executive Carmel Angelo. "It's the lack of communication."

== Fire growth and containment progress ==
Fire containment status Gray: contained; Red: active; %: percent contained;
Date	Area burned acres (km^{2})	Containment
Oct 23	400 acres (2 km^{2})	
Oct 24	16,000 acres (65 km^{2})	
Oct 25	23,700 acres (96 km^{2})	
Oct 26	25,955 acres (105 km^{2})	
Oct 27	54,298 acres (220 km^{2})	
Oct 28	74,324 acres (301 km^{2})	
Oct 29	76,138 acres (308 km^{2})	
Oct 30	76,825 acres (311 km^{2})	
Oct 31	76,825 acres (311 km^{2})	
Nov 1	77,758 acres (315 km^{2})	
Nov 2	77,758 acres (315 km^{2})	
Nov 3	77,758 acres (315 km^{2})	
Nov 4	77,758 acres (315 km^{2})	
Nov 5	77,758 acres (315 km^{2})	
Nov 6	77,758 acres (315 km^{2})	

== Cause of the fire ==
Initially, it was unknown whether or not PG&E was at fault for the fire. In a filing with the Securities and Exchange Commission (SEC), PG&E estimated a minimum loss of $600 million before available insurance. On July 16, 2020, which was after PG&E exited bankruptcy, Cal Fire reported that the fire was caused by PG&E transmission lines. Cal Fire did not make the report public, but forwarded the investigation report to the Sonoma County District Attorney's Office for further investigation. Wildfire victims filed a civil lawsuit for damages caused by the fire. Damages would not be covered by the settlement for wildfire victims that was part of the PG&E bankruptcy.

== See also ==
- 2019 California wildfires
- Tick Fire
