= Getty Fire =

2019 wildfire in Southern California

- Part of the 2019 California wildfires
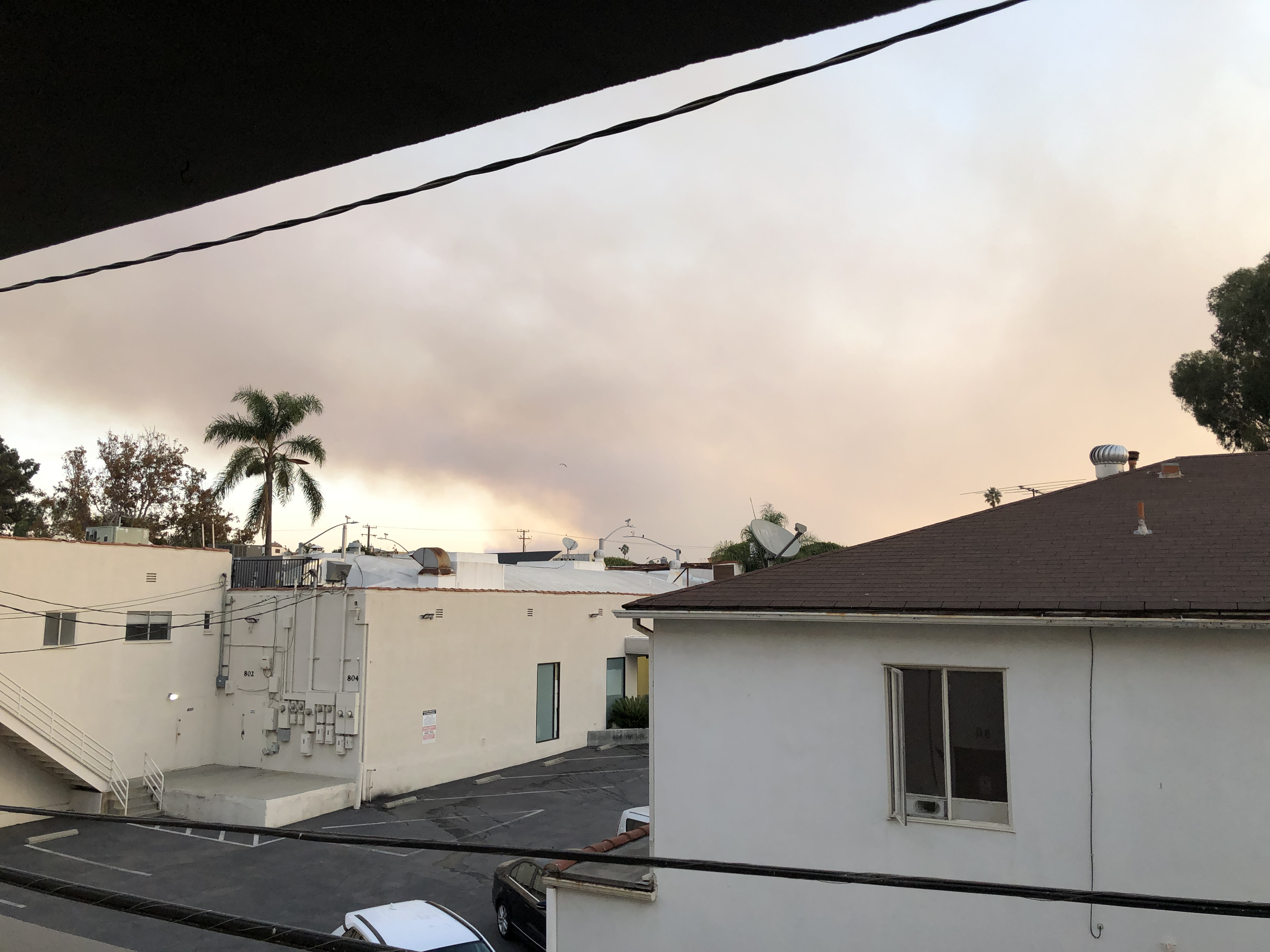
- Smoke from the Getty Fire seen from Santa Monica, California
- Date: October 28, 2019 –; November 5, 2019
- Location: Brentwood, Los Angeles, California
- Coordinates: 34.0972°N 118.4803°W

Statistics
- Burned area: 745 acres (301 ha)

Impacts
- Deaths: 0
- Injuries: 5
- Structures lost: 10

Map
- Location in Southern California

Location of Getty Fire

The Getty Fire was a 2019 wildfire that burned 745 acres (301 ha) in Brentwood, Los Angeles, California. The fire was first reported on October 28, 2019, and was contained on November 5, 2019. Thousands of people were forced to flee, 10 homes were destroyed and 15 residences were damaged.

== Progression ==
The fire is believed to have started around 1:30 a.m. along the 405 at Getty Center Drive. A tree branch broke and landed in nearby power lines, causing them to spark and arc - igniting nearby brush.

More than 1,000 firefighters along with Aerial firefighting fixed-wing aircraft and helicopters battled the blaze in steep and challenging terrain. Spurred on by 50+ mph Santa Ana winds, flames quickly licked brush along the Interstate 405 Freeway, triggering closure of all southbound lanes, and moved west into the canyons. The Getty Center — which was built to withstand fires and where firefighters were stationed to assist with logistics for helicopter operations — was never threatened.

== Effects ==
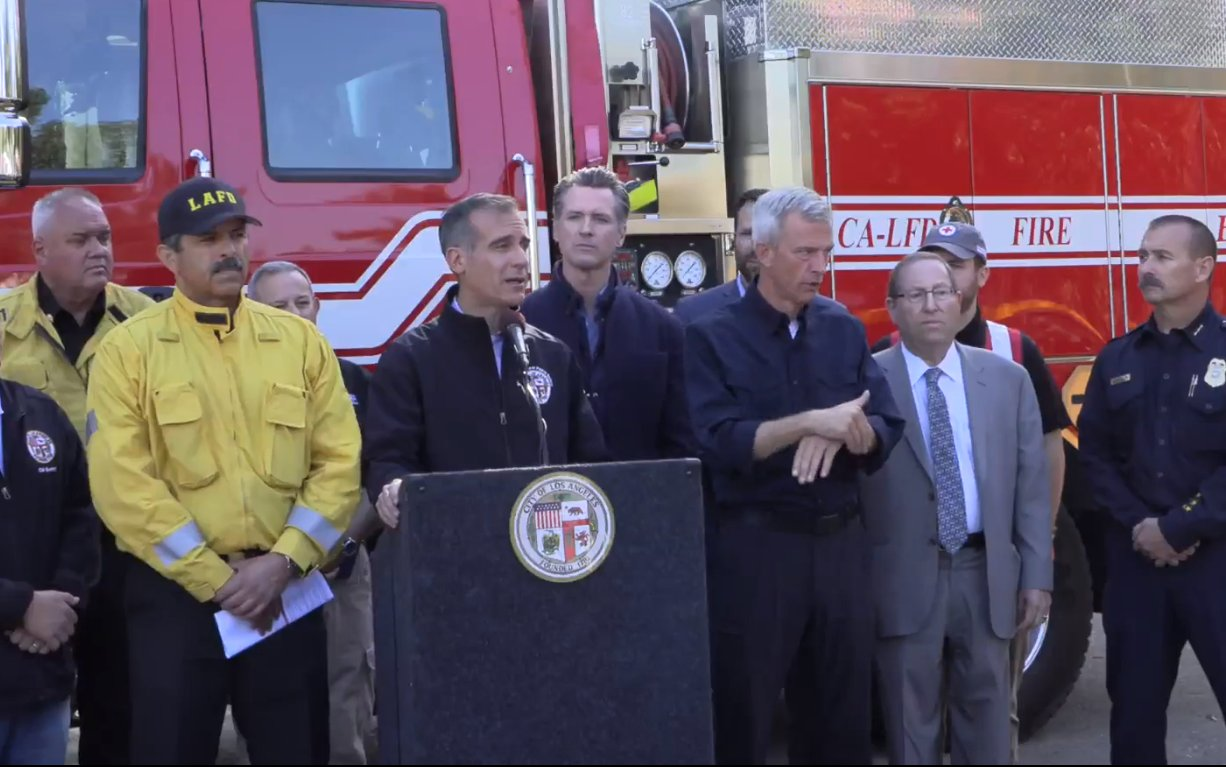
Mayor Eric Garcetti speaks with Governor Gavin Newsom and fire crews at the Getty Fire.

The borders of the mandatory evacuation zone were: Temescal Canyon Road on the west, Sunset Boulevard on the south, Mulholland Drive on the north and I-405 on the east. By Oct. 30 some residents were allowed to return home, but evacuation orders remained in effect for those between Kenter Canyon, the 405 and Mountaingate Avenue until Nov. 2. The UCLA campus, which is located about 2 miles from the fire, cancelled classes for 45,000 students, and some twenty elementary and secondary schools closed as well.

A power outage due to the blaze left roughly 900 customers without power in Bel Air, Brentwood and Westwood. Southern California Edison preemptively turned off power for nearly 16,000 customers shortly after the blaze broke out.

The LA Times cast light on the communication gaps that arise amid the confusion of such an evacuation in columnist Frank Shyong's piece, "Why did no one warn the housekeepers about the Getty Fire?" He observed gardeners, housekeepers and other domestic workers reporting for work during the fire and questioned the efforts at communication from both the employers and city.

== Fire growth and containment progress ==
Fire containment status Gray: contained; Red: active; %: percent contained;
Date	Area burned acres (km^{2})	Containment
Oct 28	500 acres (2.02 km^{2})	
Oct 29	656 acres (2.65 km^{2})	
Oct 30	745 acres (3.01 km^{2})	
Oct 31	745 acres (3.01 km^{2})	
Nov 1	745 acres (3.01 km^{2})	
Nov 2	745 acres (3.01 km^{2})	
Nov 5	745 acres (3.01 km^{2})	
