= Tick Fire =

2019 wildfire in Southern California

- Part of the 2019 California wildfires
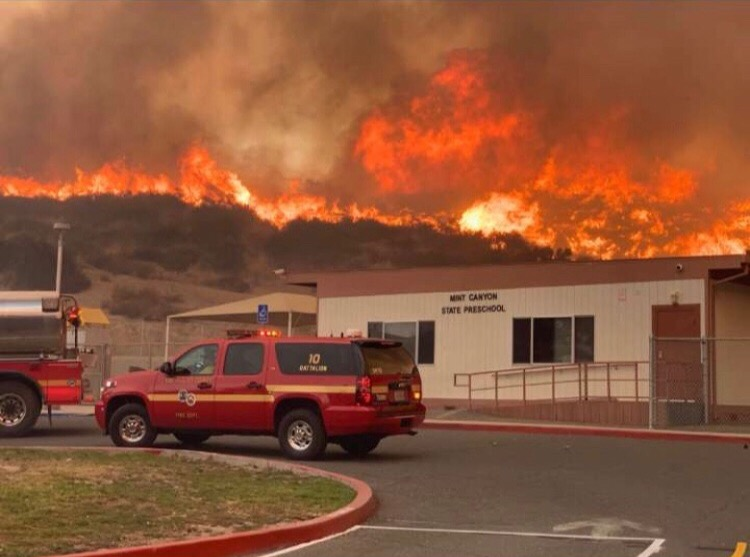
- Firefighters fighting the Tick Fire at Mint Canyon Community School
- Date: October 24, 2019 –; October 31, 2019
- Location: Los Angeles County, California
- Coordinates: 34°28′16″N 118°22′03″W

Statistics
- Burned area: 4,615 acres (1,868 ha)

Impacts
- Structures destroyed: 22

Ignition
- Cause: caused by outdoor BBQ during Edison PSPS shut off, fire driven by Santa Ana winds

The Tick Fire was a wildfire that burned in Los Angeles County, California. The fire broke out on October 24, 2019, and burned several thousand acres. The fire forced the mass evacuation of 40,000 people from the Santa Clarita Valley.

== Progression ==
The fire in Canyon Country was reported around 1:40 p.m. Thursday, October 24, near the 31600 block of Tick Canyon Road. Initially reported at 200 acres, the blaze rapidly grew to more than 850 acres in less than an hour, fire officials said.

It continued to expand overnight after it jumped State Route 14, closing portions of the highway and forcing additional evacuations in the Sand Canyon area. The blaze had burned nearly 7 square miles by the morning of October 25 and was 5% contained, according to the Los Angeles County Fire Department. Some 10,000 structures were threatened by the fire. As of 7 a.m. Saturday October 26, the blaze was 25% contained. Firefighters experienced gusts of winds exceeding 40 miles per hour and temperatures near three digits, which posed a challenge in containing the fire.

As a result of the Tick Fire, there was 1 agency (Partner, Federal, and Local Agencies), 509 total fire personnel assigned, and 8 crews assigned to contain the rapidly spreading fires. Three firefighters were injured, but there were no reported deaths.

== Effects ==
=== Road closures ===
Tick Canyon Road between Abelia and Summit Knoll was closed.

Soledad Canyon Road and Sand Canyon Road offramps were closed on October 24 and reopened. State Route 14 North and South off ramps were closed, due to the abrupt and rapid spread of the fires over the freeway.

The blaze also jammed traffic between the Antelope Valley and Los Angeles. The northbound Antelope Valley Freeway (SR 14) was reopened on October 25 as crews continued to battle the fire ahead of an anticipated shift in wind direction.

By 6 a.m. on October 26, firefighters said all road closures would be lifted, except for Baker Canyon and Tick Canyon Road. Other areas such as east of Sand Canyon Road south of Sierra Highway at Linda Vista Street, remained off limits at the time. Meanwhile, the northbound Antelope Valley Freeway, which had been closed between Golden Valley Road and Agua Dulce, was reopened at approximately 4 p.m. October 25. The Sand Canyon Road off-ramp remained closed, along with southbound lanes of the freeway, according to the California Highway Patrol.

=== School closures ===
Due to the intensity of the Santa Ana Winds and multiple fires, many schools and colleges throughout Santa Clarita were closed. These school districts, schools, and colleges included:

Sulphur Springs School District: Canyon Springs Community School, Fair Oaks Ranch Community School, Golden Oak Community School, Leona Cox Community School, Mint Canyon Community School, Mitchell Community Elementary School, Pinetree Community School, Sulphur Springs Community School, and Valley View Community School.

William S. Hart Union High School District: Academy of the Canyons High School, Bowman High School, Canyon High School, Castaic High School, Golden Valley High School, Hart High School, Learning Post High School, Saugus High School, Valencia High School, West Ranch High School, Arroyo Seco Junior High School, La Mesa Junior High School, Placerita Junior High School, Rancho Pico Junior High School, Rio Norte Junior High School, Sierra Vista Junior High School, Golden Oak Adult School, Independent study, and Sequoia School.

Newhall School District: McGrath Elementary, Meadows Elementary, Newhall Elementary, Oak Hills Elementary, Old Orchard Elementary, Peachland Elementary, Pico Canyon Elementary, Stevenson Ranch Elementary, Valencia Valley Elementary, and Wiley Canyon Elementary.

Saugus Union School District: Santa Clarita Elementary School, Bridgeport Elementary School, Cedarcreek Elementary School, Emblem Academy, James Foster Elementary School, Charles Helmers Elementary School, Highlands Elementary School, Mountainview Elementary School, Northpark Elementary School, Plum Canyon Elementary School, Rio Vista Elementary School, Rosedell Elementary School, Skyblue Mesa Elementary School, Tesoro Elementary School, and West Creek Academy.

Colleges: College of the Canyons (Valencia), College of the Canyons (Canyon Country), and California Institute of the Arts (Valencia)

=== Power outages ===
Southern California Edison had preemptively turned off circuits in the areas during Santa Ana wind event, effectively shutting down well pumps and water use in areas on wells and delivered water held in tanks, in addition to household electricity. After start of Tick Fire, additional circuits were shut down as a preventive measure to reduce the risk of their equipment igniting another fire. On October 24, areas in Santa Clarita that were affected by the power outages included Agua Dulce and Canyon Country, leaving about 26,000 residents without power. Another 380,000 residents were at risk of these power outages.

=== Evacuation centers ===
Evacuation centers were opened for evacuees on October 25.

The gymnasium of College of the Canyons Valencia admitted approximately 400 residents affected by the fires.

West Ranch High School opened to provide shelter to residents as well.

The Castaic Animal Care Center provided shelter for pets, as people searched for and stayed in shelter centers.

=== Political response ===
On October 24, the Governor announced that the state has secured federal Fire Management Assistance Grants to help ensure the availability of resources to fight the Kincade and Tick fires and enable local, state and tribal agencies to recover eligible costs. County Board of Supervisors chair Janice Hahn also issued a local emergency declaration.

A public briefing in Los Angeles was held that day, regarding the ongoing fire threats and the need to hold utilities accountable for the consequences of their decisions to shut off power for large portions of the state.

On October 25, Governor Gavin Newsom issued an emergency proclamation for the counties of Sonoma and Los Angeles due to the effects of the Kincade and Tick fires.

Later on October 25, Governor Newsom traveled to Sonoma County to survey areas impacted by the Kincade Fire and meet with emergency responders, residents, health officers and local and state officials.

=== Evacuations ===
More than 4,000 residents in the Northeast Santa Clarita area were evacuated during the Tick Fires. Canyon Country was one of the most affected communities. Mandatory evacuations were located along Tick Canyon Road from Abelia Road to Summit Knoll Road.

The power outages caused residents difficulty during escape, as they had to pack belongings in their houses without light. There was difficulty evacuating, as traffic lights were disabled. This, along with road closures caused slow, heavy traffic.

While Santa Clarita families in the urban areas were more easily able to escape, residents on farms had greater difficulty evacuating. One account of a farmer in Canyon Country, Samantha Hull, described evacuating from her farm: "We were running through a pitch-black house trying to grab animals.” Other Santa Clarita farmers let their animals roam free or attempt to hull them into their vehicles and escape.

== Growth and containment ==
Fire containment status Gray: contained; Red: active; %: percent contained;
Date	Area burned acres (km^{2})	Containment
Oct 24	4,005 acres (16.21 km^{2})	
Oct 25	4,615 acres (18.68 km^{2})	
Oct 26	4,615 acres (18.68 km^{2})	
Oct 27	4,615 acres (18.68 km^{2})	
Oct 28	4,615 acres (18.68 km^{2})	
Oct 29	4,615 acres (18.68 km^{2})	
Oct 30	4,615 acres (18.68 km^{2})	
Oct 31	4,615 acres (18.68 km^{2})	

== See also ==
- 2019 California wildfires
- Kincade Fire
