= Red Bank Fire =

2019 wildfire in Northern California

- Part of the 2019 California wildfires
- Date: September 5, 2019 –; September 13, 2019
- Location: Tehama County, California
- Coordinates: 40.12°N 122.64°W

Statistics
- Burned area: 8,838 acres (3,577 ha)

Impacts
- Structures destroyed: 2

Ignition
- Cause: Lightning

Map
- Location in Northern California

Location of Red Bank Fire

The Red Bank Fire was one of a series of wildfires in Tehama County, California, 25 miles west of Red Bluff. The Red Bank area fire was ignited from a series lightning strikes and erupted out of control on Thursday, September 5, 2019. The blaze, along with the South and Henthrone fires, is burning in a remote location, 30 miles south of Redding, California. The fire was contained on September 13 at 8,838 acres (36 km^{2}). Two structures were destroyed.

== Progression ==
The fire, which was caused by lightning, was reported burning in the early afternoon hours of Thursday, September 5, in the area of Hammer Loop Road and Petty John Road amid critical fire weather conditions. Due to these conditions, the fire made rapid runs towards the northwest where it grew from an initial 10 acres, up to 1,000 acres (4 km^{2}) by 3:30 pm to well over 6,000 acres (24 km^{2}) by that evening. Petty John Road to the boundary of Shasta Trinity National Forest was put under mandatory evacuation, as well as Red Bank Oaks subdivision. Evacuations were also put in place for the area west of Highway 36 from Tedoc to Vestal and all road south of that.

As of Friday, September 6, those evacuations remained in place as the fire continued to grow in size, however it was largely consuming land used for cattle grazing. The fire was also reported to be a mere 5% contained that day. Meanwhile, the South fire had erupted from 200 acres (1 km^{2}) Friday morning to 1,665 acres (7 km^{2}) acres by that night due to limited access caused by the activity of the Red Bank fire. By that evening, containment had only risen to 7% while the Red Bank fire's size had grown to 7,340 acres (30 km^{2}).

By September 8, the fire had grown to 8,838 acres (36 km^{2}). The fire was contained on September 13. Two structures were destroyed.

== Effects ==
The areas south of Highway 36 between Tedoc Road and Vestal Road, and between the Shasta-Trinity National Forest boundary and the Four Corners intersection were under mandatory evacuation.

== See also ==
- 2019 California wildfires
