= Tucker Fire =

2019 wildfire in Northern California

- Part of the 2019 California wildfires
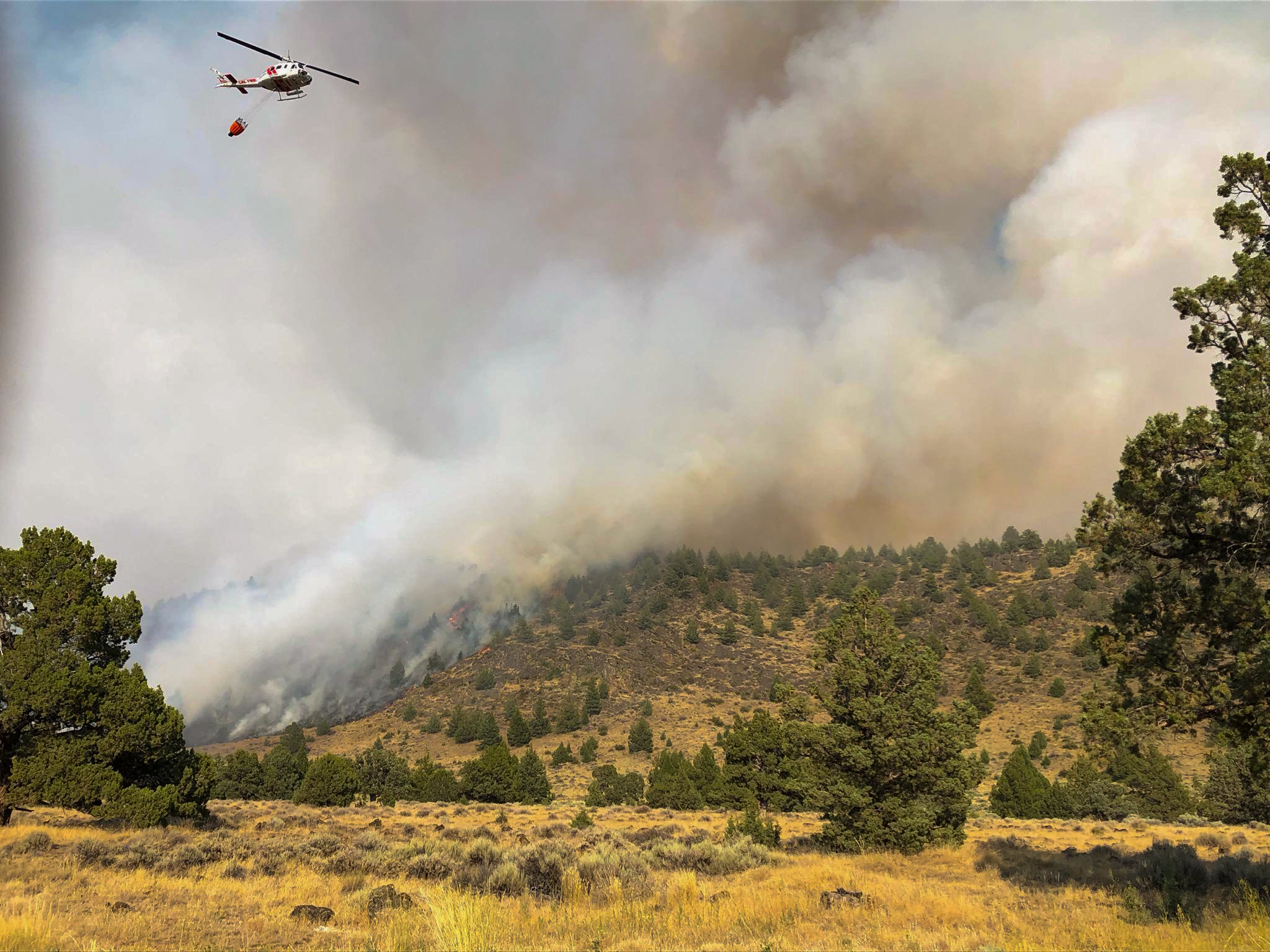
- Date: July 28, 2019 –; August 15, 2019
- Location: Clear Lake National Wildlife Refuge, Modoc County, California
- Coordinates: 41.726°N 121.243°W

Statistics
- Burned area: 14,217 acres (5,753 ha)

Ignition
- Cause: Human Caused

Map
- Location in California

The Tucker Fire was a wildfire that burned near Clear Lake National Wildlife Refuge in Modoc County, California in the United States. The fire ignited on Sunday, July 28, 2019, along Highway 139 and went on to burn an estimated 14,217 acres of land. As of August 15, the fire was 95% contained. Officials say the wildfire was caused by traffic on Highway 139.

== Progression ==
The Tucker fire ignited on Sunday, July 28, along Tucker Butte Road, east of California State Route 139 near the Perez Overpass and immediately grew to over 2,000 acres (809 ha) of land its first several hours of burning. Throughout its run, the fire did not impact any structures of note however did directly impact large transmission lines within the fire area.

Early Monday, July 29, the fire had grown to an estimated 2,461 acres (996 ha). Later that day, the fire spotted outside of control lines and proceeded to balloon in size to over 11,000 acres (4,452 ha) throughout that afternoon due to warm and dry weather conditions, burning predominantly northeast towards Clear Lake Reservoir. During that time, residents along County Road 114/202, Coyote Butte and the Horse Mountain areas were put under a fire warning, but not under any evacuation warning. At the time, the Tucker Fire was regarded as the largest blaze to burn on National Forest Land during the 2019 fire season as the blaze had grown to upwards of 12,973 acres (5,250 ha) in what had been regarded as an unusually inactive fire season for the state. Late Monday evening, as the blaze made its way to a nature fire break in the Clear Lake Reservoir, fire crews conducted burn-out operations to corral the flare up wherever necessary. By this time over 500 firefighters where actively engaging the fire.

By Tuesday, July 30, the Tucker Fire had not displayed any erratic behavior as it had the previous two days of burning and was estimated to be 14,419 acres (5,835 ha) with at least 10% containment. Within the following days, the fires containment would grow to 95% as the estimated acreage would be slightly downgraded to 14,217 acres (5,753 ha).

== Cause ==
The U.S. Forest Service cited that, much like two previous fires in the Modoc County area during the summer fire season, the Tucker fires ignition was directly human-caused, however unintentionally. No further details have been reported on the specifics of the fires ignition as of this time.
