= Mountain Fire (2019) =

2019 wildfire in Northern California

- Part of the 2019 California wildfires
- Date: August 22, 2019 –; August 26, 2019
- Location: Redding, Shasta County, California
- Coordinates: 40.715477°N 122.2429693°W

Statistics
- Burned area: 600 acres (243 ha)

Impacts
- Injuries: 3
- Structures lost: 14 destroyed, 7 damaged
- Cost: $3.0 million

Ignition
- Cause: Under investigation

Map
- Location in California

The Mountain Fire was a wildfire in August, 2019 in the area of Jones Valley in Shasta County, several miles east of Redding, California. The fire broke out on Thursday, August 22, 2019, off Bear Mountain Road and Dry Creek Road, north of Bella Vista in Shasta County. Burning within the community of Jones Valley, the fire ultimately destroyed fourteen structures including seven homes, damaged seven others and burned 600 acres (243 ha) of forest land. At its peak, the Mountain Fire threatened over 1,100 homes and also led to the evacuation of over 4,000 residents. Three people suffered minor injuries related to the fire, but no deaths were reported in the blaze.
