= Sandalwood Fire =

2019 wildfire in Southern California

- Part of the 2019 California wildfires
- Date: October 10, 2019 –; October 14, 2019
- Location: Riverside County, California
- Coordinates: 33.994661°N 117.063106°W

Statistics
- Burned area: 1,011 acres (409 ha)

Impacts
- Deaths: 2
- Injuries: 3
- Structures lost: 74 structures destroyed, 16 damaged

Map
- Location in Southern California

Location of Sandalwood Fire

The Sandalwood Fire was a wildfire that burned in the city of Calimesa in Riverside County, California. The fire started on October 10, 2019 in the afternoon, killing two people and destroying 74 structures.

The fire, named after a street near where the fire started, ignited when a garbage truck dumped its smoldering load next to a canyon of dry scrub.

== Progression ==
Reported during a Santa Ana wind event that was anticipated for the area at around 1:58 pm Thursday, October 10, the Sandalwood fire broke out along Calimesa Boulevard and Sandalwood Drive immediately raced into nearby brush burning in a southwesterly direction due to the strong winds. Within the first hour of the fire, the conflagration was already heavily impacting the Villa Calimesa mobile home park where most of the damage from the fire would occur. The fire continued to spread rapidly as was reportedly over by 4 pm that afternoon and also threatening the nearby railway, power grid, and a second mobile home park in the area. Throughout the day, the fire would destroy most of the Villa Calimesa mobile home park and ultimately cause the death of two civilians in the area.

Six air tankers and eight helicopters assisted in the firefighting operation.
