= Calimesa, California =

City in California, United States

- City
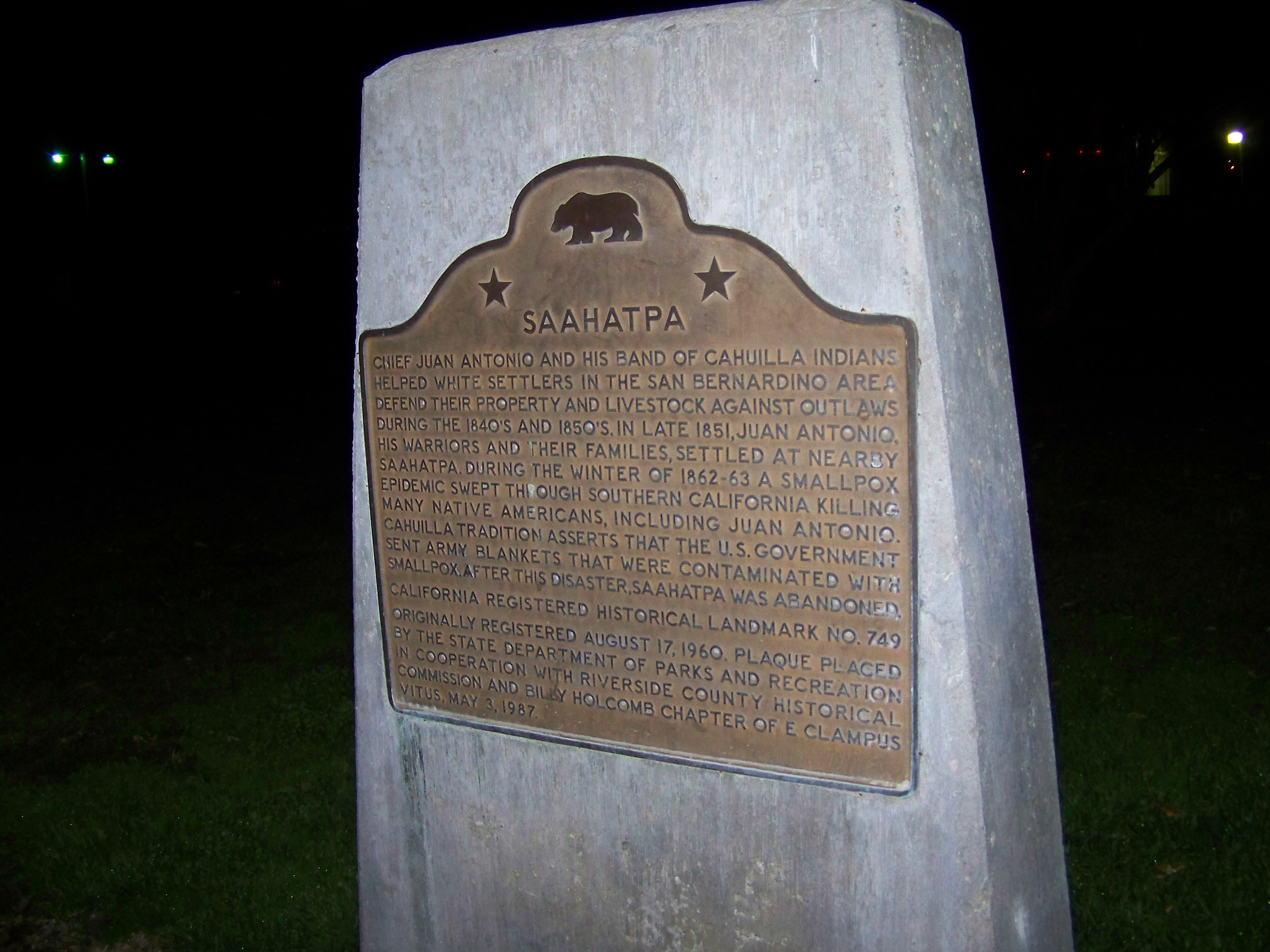
- Saahatpa plaque

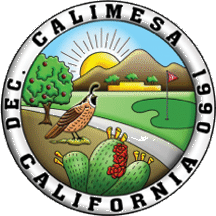
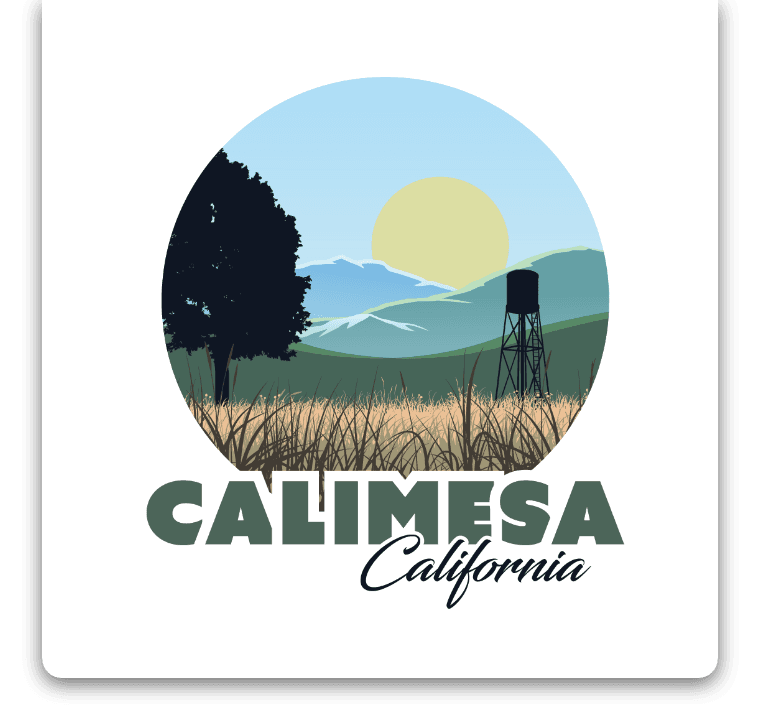
- Seal Logo
- Interactive map of Calimesa, California
- Location in the United States
- Coordinates: 34°00′14″N 117°03′43″W
- Country: United States
- State: California
- County: Riverside
- Incorporated (city): December 1, 1990

Government
  - Type: Council-Manager
  - Mayor: Jeff Cervantez
  - Mayor Pro Tem: John Manly
  - City Council: Eric Cundieff; Edgar Garcia; Linda Molina
  - City Manager: Will Kolbow

Area
  - Total: 14.86 sq mi (38.50 km^{2})
  - Land: 14.86 sq mi (38.50 km^{2})
  - Water: 0 sq mi (0.00 km^{2}) 0%
- Elevation: 2,392 ft (729 m)

Population (2020)
  - Total: 10,026
  - Density: 674.4/sq mi (260.39/km^{2})
- Time zone: UTC-8 (PST)
  - Summer (DST): UTC-7 (PDT)
- ZIP code: 92320
- Area code: 909
- FIPS code: 06-09864
- GNIS feature IDs: 1667904, 2409961
- Website: www.calimesa.gov

Calimesa (portmanteau of California and Mesa, Spanish for "table") is a city in the Inland Empire region of Riverside County, California, United States. The population was 10,026 at the 2020 census, up from 7,879 at the 2010 census. It is situated in the San Gorgonio Pass.

== History ==
=== Etymology ===
Historically, Calimesa began as a small rural town with mostly single-family homes and ranches. With completion of U.S. Route 99 (now I-10), businesses opened and Calimesa began to take on a separate identity from the larger neighboring town of Yucaipa. In June 1929, nearly 100 residents attended a meeting and decided to apply for their own post office and to start a "name contest" in which the winner was paid $10. Calimesa was chosen from 107 names submitted, and is said to come from "cali" (referring to California) and "mesa" from the Spanish word meaning "table" or "table-lands." The first post office was the grocery store at Calimesa Boulevard and Avenue K.

=== Beginnings ===
The Serrano people and the Cahuilla people inhabited the area.

The modern history of the area was initiated with the establishment of Spanish missions in Alta California in 1769. The need for a land route to these missions inspired Captain Juan Bautista de Anza to lead a party through the area in 1774. As early as 1820, reference can be found to the messenger footpath for the missions in Arizona to the San Gabriel Mission.

The Assistencia in Redlands (which has been rebuilt), and Rancho San Gorgonio, were part of the San Gabriel Mission located near today's Los Angeles. The San Gorgonio rancheria covered most of the San Gorgonio Pass area. A site within the rancheria, the location of the present Highland Springs Ranch & Inn, along with Whitewater, and a house at the east end of present-day Singleton Road in Calimesa, all became stage stops along this path.

The post office reinforced the residents' feeling of a community separate from the town of Yucaipa. In 1939 or 1940, the Calimesa Improvement Association, Inc. was formed. According to the constitution of the association, "The object and purpose of the association shall be the development and improvement of Calimesa and The Community". Volunteers built a community center at the corner of Bryant and Avenue H, which had been designated a park site by the Redlands-Yucaipa Land Company. The "South Mesa Water Company" purchased the land for a well site and allowed the association to use it for community events.

In 1962, the Calimesa Improvement Association became the Calimesa Chamber of Commerce. The Improvement Association and the Chamber have operated as a mix of promoting Calimesa, providing community service, and being a sounding board for residents’ problems. Prior to 1949, the fire protection for the valley was provided by the California Department of Forestry at the Avenue A station, which today is the office of County Service Area 63 in Yucaipa. Calimesa community members felt the need for more protection on the south side of the wash, so in 1949 they formed the Volunteer Fire Department.

=== Incorporation ===
The City of Calimesa was incorporated on December 1, 1990, soon after the incorporation of its northern neighbor, the City of Yucaipa. Prior to its incorporation, the City of Calimesa existed as an unincorporated census designated town that straddled the Riverside–San Bernardino County line at the location where Interstate 10 climbs the San Gorgonio Pass going eastward from Redlands, California.

=== Future ===
The previous decade saw several planned communities approved for development within the city, including the JP Ranch Development (approximately 750 total homes), Calimesa Springs Development (approximately 270 homes), Summerwind Ranch at Oak Valley (3,841 homes, 260 acres of mixed-use commercial), and Mesa Verde (3,500 homes, and 64 acres of mixed-use commercial space). The number of approved units currently outnumbers the total population within the city. However, development of these large tracts have been slow to move forward until the demand increases.

== Sandalwood Fire ==
The Sandalwood Fire was a wildfire that burned in the city of Calimesa in Riverside County, California. The fire started on October 10, 2019 in the afternoon, killing two people and destroying 74 structures. The fire burned for five days.

== Transportation ==
The city is accessible from Interstate 10, which geographically traverses the city from north to south. Major transportation corridors include County Line Road (which runs east–west from the freeway), Sandalwood Drive (which runs east–west from the freeway), Singleton Road (which runs east–west from the freeway), Cherry Valley Boulevard (which runs east–west from the freeway), Avenue "L" (which runs east–west from the freeway), Myrtlewood Drive (which runs east–west from Calimesa Boulevard to California Street), Calimesa Boulevard (which runs north–south and parallels the freeway from Live Oak Canyon Road in Yucaipa to Cherry Valley Boulevard/Tukwet Canyon Parkway near Beaumont), and Bryant Street (which runs north–south from Highway 38/Mill Creek Road/Mentone Boulevard and connects with Singleton Road). The city has no airports or direct access to railroads.

== Geography ==
The city is located in the northwestern portion of Riverside County, between Yucaipa and Beaumont. It is within the Yucaipa Valley section of Southern California's Inland Valley, and at the western edge of the San Gorgonio Pass between San Bernardino and Palm Springs. Calimesa is located in the region known as the Inland Empire, which covers San Bernardino and Riverside Counties.

Situated within the foothills of the San Bernardino Mountains, the city's elevation ranges between 2,300 to 3,500 feet (700 to 1,070 m) above sea level.

According to the United States Census Bureau, the city has a total area of 14.9 square miles (39 km^{2}), all of it land.

=== City limits ===
Historically, Calimesa is divided from the City of Yucaipa by the Wildwood Canyon Wash; politically, "County Line Road" divides the two towns. Much of what was originally known as "Calimesa" actually lies within the city boundaries of Yucaipa, including "I-Street" (Calimesa) Park and Calimesa Elementary School. Because State of California law prohibits the incorporation or annexation of cities over county lines, the city was unable to adjoin what was considered the town of Calimesa when it finally incorporated. When Yucaipa incorporated, it included the area outside of the Yucaipa Valley on the "hilltop" or "mesa" that was traditionally known as Calimesa within its city boundaries, so as not to leave a gap of unincorporated area between the two towns. Although the two cities are in separate counties, both Yucaipa and Calimesa share the same basic street grid system and addressing, including many named and alphabetical streets which extend from Yucaipa well into Calimesa. The general boundary between the two cities is County Line Road, which does not follow the exact county line in some places due to the alignment of Calimesa Creek, which meanders in and out of both Yucaipa and Calimesa.

The city limits of Calimesa also extend south to the City of Beaumont, California. Although much less refined, the boundaries between Beaumont and Calimesa fall generally along the Southern California Edison (SCE) right-of-way that extends from the El Casco electrical sub-station facility near Moreno Valley, California, eastward. Near Interstate 10, Champions Drive is the common boundary between the two cities.

== Demographics ==
Historical population
Census	Pop.	Note	%±
1990	4,647		—
2000	7,139		53.6%
2010	7,879		10.4%
2020	10,026		27.2%
U.S. Decennial Census

=== Racial and ethnic composition ===
Calimesa city, California – Racial and ethnic composition Note: the US Census treats Hispanic/Latino as an ethnic category. This table excludes Latinos from the racial categories and assigns them to a separate category. Hispanics/Latinos may be of any race.
Race / Ethnicity (NH = Non-Hispanic)	Pop 1990	Pop 2000	Pop 2010	Pop 2020	% 1990	% 2000	% 2010	% 2020
White alone (NH)	4,068	5,845	5,730	6,155	87.54%	81.87%	72.72%	61.39%
Black or African American alone (NH)	2	41	75	167	0.04%	0.57%	0.95%	1.67%
Native American or Alaska Native alone (NH)	36	32	67	52	0.77%	0.45%	0.85%	0.52%
Asian alone (NH)	51	73	93	275	1.10%	1.02%	1.18%	2.74%
Native Hawaiian or Pacific Islander alone (NH)	51	7	10	12	1.10%	0.10%	0.13%	0.12%
Other race alone (NH)	2	8	5	40	0.04%	0.11%	0.06%	0.40%
Mixed race or Multiracial (NH)	x	125	137	406	x	1.75%	1.74%	4.05%
Hispanic or Latino (any race)	488	1,008	1,762	2,894	10.50%	14.12%	22.36%	28.86%
Total	4,647	7,139	7,879	10,026	100.00%	100.00%	100.00%	100.00%

=== 2020 census ===
As of the 2020 census, Calimesa had a population of 10,026. The population density was 674.8 inhabitants per square mile (260.5/km^{2}). The median age was 45.9 years. 20.0% of residents were under the age of 18 and 24.9% of residents were 65 years of age or older. For every 100 females there were 95.1 males, and for every 100 females age 18 and over there were 91.7 males age 18 and over.

The census reported that 99.6% of the population lived in households, 0.3% lived in non-institutionalized group quarters, and 0.1% were institutionalized. 89.8% of residents lived in urban areas, while 10.2% lived in rural areas.

There were 3,922 households in Calimesa, of which 27.6% had children under the age of 18 living in them. Of all households, 51.9% were married-couple households, 5.4% were cohabiting couple households, 16.1% were households with a male householder and no spouse or partner present, and 26.6% were households with a female householder and no spouse or partner present. About 24.9% of all households were made up of individuals and 15.7% had someone living alone who was 65 years of age or older. The average household size was 2.55, and there were 2,699 families (68.8% of all households).

There were 4,161 housing units at an average density of 280.1 units per square mile (108.1 units/km^{2}); 3,922 (94.3%) were occupied and 5.7% were vacant. Of the occupied units, 84.0% were owner-occupied and 16.0% were occupied by renters. The homeowner vacancy rate was 2.7% and the rental vacancy rate was 4.5%.

=== 2023 estimate ===
In 2023, the US Census Bureau estimated that the median household income was $90,313, and the per capita income was $39,738. About 3.7% of families and 6.7% of the population were below the poverty line.

=== 2010 census ===
At the 2010 census Calimesa had a population of 7,879. The population density was 530.7 inhabitants per square mile (204.9/km^{2}). The racial makeup of Calimesa was 6,777 (86.0%) White (72.7% Non-Hispanic White), 88 (1.1%) African American, 99 (1.3%) Native American, 100 (1.3%) Asian, 10 (0.1%) Pacific Islander, 565 (7.2%) from other races, and 240 (3.0%) from two or more races. Hispanic or Latino of any race were 1,762 persons (22.4%).

The census reported that 7,828 people (99.4% of the population) lived in households, 42 (0.5%) lived in non-institutionalized group quarters, and 9 (0.1%) were institutionalized.

There were 3,314 households, 773 (23.3%) had children under the age of 18 living in them, 1,609 (48.6%) were opposite-sex married couples living together, 334 (10.1%) had a female householder with no husband present, 157 (4.7%) had a male householder with no wife present. There were 162 (4.9%) unmarried opposite-sex partnerships, and 22 (0.7%) same-sex married couples or partnerships. 1,024 households (30.9%) were one person and 609 (18.4%) had someone living alone who was 65 or older. The average household size was 2.36. There were 2,100 families (63.4% of households); the average family size was 2.94.

The age distribution was 1,414 people (17.9%) under the age of 18, 602 people (7.6%) aged 18 to 24, 1,513 people (19.2%) aged 25 to 44, 2,310 people (29.3%) aged 45 to 64, and 2,040 people (25.9%) who were 65 or older. The median age was 48.8 years. For every 100 females, there were 92.4 males. For every 100 females age 18 and over, there were 89.8 males.

There were 3,687 housing units at an average density of 248.3 per square mile, of the occupied units 2,674 (80.7%) were owner-occupied and 640 (19.3%) were rented. The homeowner vacancy rate was 5.9%; the rental vacancy rate was 10.3%. 6,059 people (76.9% of the population) lived in owner-occupied housing units and 1,769 people (22.5%) lived in rental housing units.

According to the 2010 United States Census, Calimesa had a median household income of $44,817, with 14.5% of the population living below the federal poverty line.

== Government ==
United States presidential election results for Calimesa, California
Year	Republican		Democratic		Third party(ies)	
Year	No.	%	No.	%	No.	%
2000	1,747	56.10%	1,239	39.79%	128	4.11%
2004	2,136	63.42%	1,193	35.42%	39	1.16%
2008	2,172	61.27%	1,305	36.81%	68	1.92%
2012	2,080	63.90%	1,104	33.92%	71	2.18%
2016	2,366	63.11%	1,177	31.40%	206	5.49%
2020	3,586	63.25%	1,968	34.71%	116	2.05%
2024	3,815	64.60%	1,964	33.25%	127	2.15%

In the California State Legislature, Calimesa is in the 19th senatorial district, represented by Republican Rosilicie Ochoa Bogh, and in the 47th Assembly district, represented by Republican Greg Wallis.

In the United States House of Representatives, Calimesa is in California's 41st congressional district, represented by Republican Ken Calvert.

Calimesa was one of a few cities in California to elect a Libertarian mayor, by the name of Jeff Hewitt, serving from December 2015 to December 2018.

=== 2009 Voter Registration Information ===
- Total Registered Voters = 4,301

- Democrats - 1,373 or 32%
- Republican - 2,121 or 49%
- Other - 180 or 4%
- Decline to State - 627 or 15%

== Education ==
Public education for most Calimesa children is provided by the Yucaipa-Calimesa Joint Unified School District, with the remaining southernmost area now served by the neighboring Beaumont Unified School District.

=== Schools ===
The City of Calimesa is within two school districts; the Yucaipa-Calimesa Joint Unified School District serves the western portion of the city, while the southeastern end of the city is served by the Beaumont Unified School District. There is currently only one public school in Calimesa, Mesa View Middle School, which opened in late August 2009. Mesa View was built to be the school district's second high school. However, due to a slowdown in home construction, the district is facing declining enrollment. As a result, Mesa View will remain a middle school until growth requires a change. In November 2017, a 13-year-old student at Mesa View Middle School who was frequently bullied committed suicide, increasing global awareness about bullying and suicide among young adults.

Calimesa Elementary School is actually located within the City of Yucaipa, and high school students attend Yucaipa High School. Calimesa's only currently-operating elementary school—and only currently operating high school—is Mesa Grande Academy, a private K-12 school owned by the Seventh-day Adventist Church.

The nearest community college is Crafton Hills College in Yucaipa.

== Public safety ==
Police services in Calimesa are provided by the Riverside County Sheriff's Department via the Cabazon regional station.

The city of Calimesa is served by the Calimesa Fire Department.

Although there are several clinics in Calimesa, the nearest medical facilities are in Yucaipa, Redlands, Banning and Beaumont.
