= South Fire =

2019 wildfire in Northern California

- Part of the 2019 California wildfires
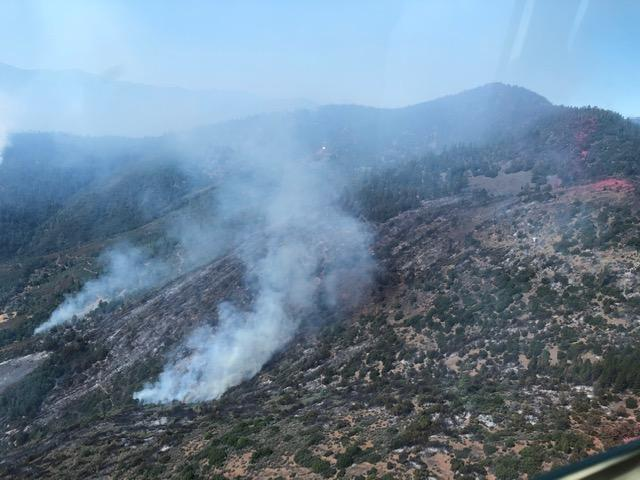
- South Fire on September 8, 2019
- Date: September 5, 2019 –; October 11, 2019
- Location: Tomhead Mountain, Tehama County, California, United States
- Coordinates: 40.109°N 122.789°W

Statistics
- Burned area: 5,332 acres (2,158 ha)

Ignition
- Cause: Lightning

Map
- Location in California

The South Fire was a wildfire that burned on the southeast side of Tomhead Mountain in Shasta-Trinity National Forest in Tehama County, California in the United States. The fire was started by a lightning strike, making it one of 26 reported fires in the area due to thunderstorm. On October 17, the fire had burned 5,332 acres (2,158 ha) and was 75 percent contained. Select trails and roads in the fire area were closed.

== Progression ==
The South Fire was reported on September 5 at approximately 1:45 p.m. on the southeast side of Tomhead Mountain in Shasta-Trinity National Forest. It was started as a result of a lightning strike, along with 25 other reported fires in the area started due to a thunderstorm. As of September 6, the fire had burned an estimated 1,200 acres (486 ha) and 24-hours later, it had grown to 1,665 acres (674 ha). Fire crews struggled to contain the fire due to the Red Bank Fire, which has blocked access to the South Fire. Fire authorities also moved resources to the Red Bank Fire, due to its size and proximity to populated areas. However, as of Sunday, September 8, fire crews were being sent to the South Fire, as crew gained control over the Red Bank Fire. No major structures have been threatened by the fire, which as of Sunday, was primarily burning on private land in a remote area.

== Effects ==
On September 17, portion of trails and roads are closed in the fire area in Shasta-Trinity National Forest.
