= Taboose Fire =

2019 wildfire in Eastern California

- Part of the 2019 California wildfires
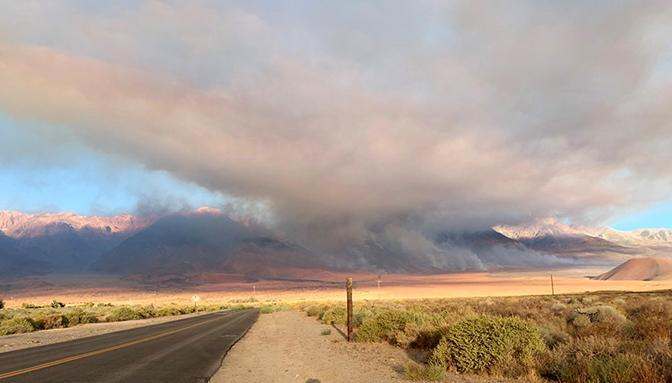
- Taboose Fire on September 8, 2019
- Date: September 4, 2019 – November 21, 2019
- Location: Inyo National Forest, Inyo County, California, United States
- Coordinates: 37.034°N 118.345°W

Statistics
- Burned area: 10,296 acres (4,167 ha)

Ignition
- Cause: Lightning

Map
- Location in California

The Taboose Fire was a wildfire burning in Inyo National Forest, southwest of Big Pine and northwest of Aberdeen in Inyo County in the state of California, in the United States. The fire started September 4, 2019 and on October 7, it had burned 10,296 acres (4,167 ha) and was 75% contained. The cause of the fire was lightning. Select trails, campgrounds and roads in Inyo National Forest, Sequoia National Park and Kings Canyon National Park had been closed due to the fire. The community of Baxter Ranch was under mandatory evacuation. The fire was fully contained by November 21, 2019.

== Progression ==
The Taboose Fire was reported around 6:30 p.m. southwest of Big Pine and northwest of Aberdeen in the Inyo National Forest in California. By the morning of September 5, the fire was 125 acres (51 ha) and was burning at 5,000 feet in elevation in sagebrush, in rocky area. Fire crews struggled to suppress the fire due to the challenge of accessing the site from roads. Helicopters began water drops and mandatory evacuations were put in place for the Birch Creek area and Aberdeen and Fish Springs were put under evacuation warnings. The National Forest evacuated the Taboose and Tinnemaha Creek campgrounds, both which were used by fire crews as bases. By the evening, the fire was 30% contained. The next morning, on September 6, Taboose Creek Campground was reopened.

Over the weekend, high winds caused spot fires, increasing the size of the fire to 4,000 acres (1,619 ha) by the morning of Sunday, September 8. Containment was at 10%. Despite reopening three days prior, Taboose Creek Campground was placed under evacuation advisory. Tinnemaha Road was closed. Three park trails were closed, including trails that pass through Sequoia National Park and Kings Canyon National Park. By the evening, the fire was reported at 10,500 acres (4,249 ha) after aircraft were able to map the fire's footprint. Air tankers and helicopters began dropping fire retardant and water. Four vehicles were destroyed in the fire at the Red Lake Trailhead. Baxter Ranch was put under mandatory evacuation and more roads were closed in the surrounding area. Hikers were evacuated at Red Lake using helicopters. On September 9, more campgrounds were closed.

On the morning of September 10, Unified Command reported that the fire has burned 9,335 acres (3,778 ha), despite original estimates that it had burned over 10,000 acres (4,047 ha). That evening, select areas were opened to the public, no longer under mandatory evacuation. As of September 11, the fire was 47% contained. The fire began burning in John Muir Wilderness. Firefighters began working with the National Forest to begin clean up processes, including fire suppression and rehab and damage mitigation. A Fire Weather Watch has been put in place by the National Weather Service due to dry, windy conditions anticipated for the weekend.

== Effects ==
=== Evacuations and closures ===
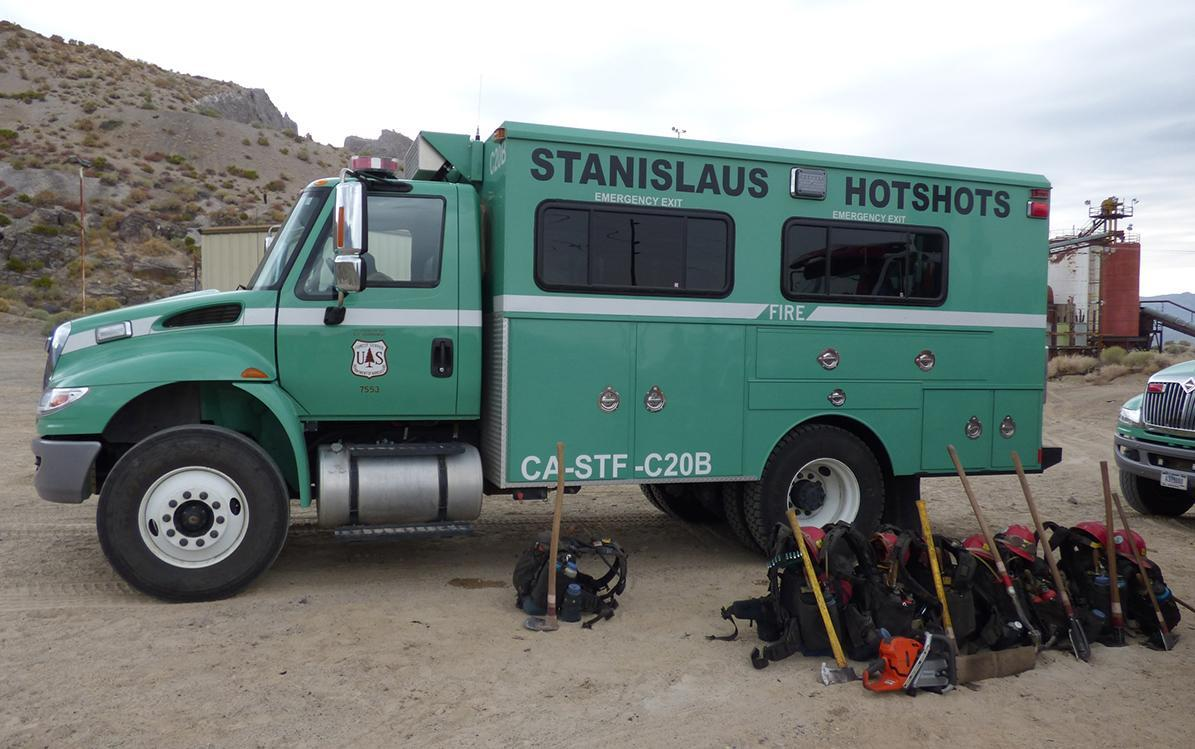
Fire crews from Stanislaus County were onsite to fight the fire.

On September 18, mandatory evacuations remained in place for Baxter Ranch.

On October 7, Taboose Creek Campground remained closed and the fire had burned 10,296 acres (4,167 ha) and was 75% contained.

The following roads were closed: Tinemaha Road, Taboose Creek Road at Aberdeen, Birch Creek Road, McMurry Meadows Road, Goodale Road, and Goodale Creek Road.

The Birch Creek Trail, Red Lake Trail, and Taboose Creek Trails were closed. The following campgrounds were closed: Goodale Creek, Taboose Creek and Tinnemaha Creek.

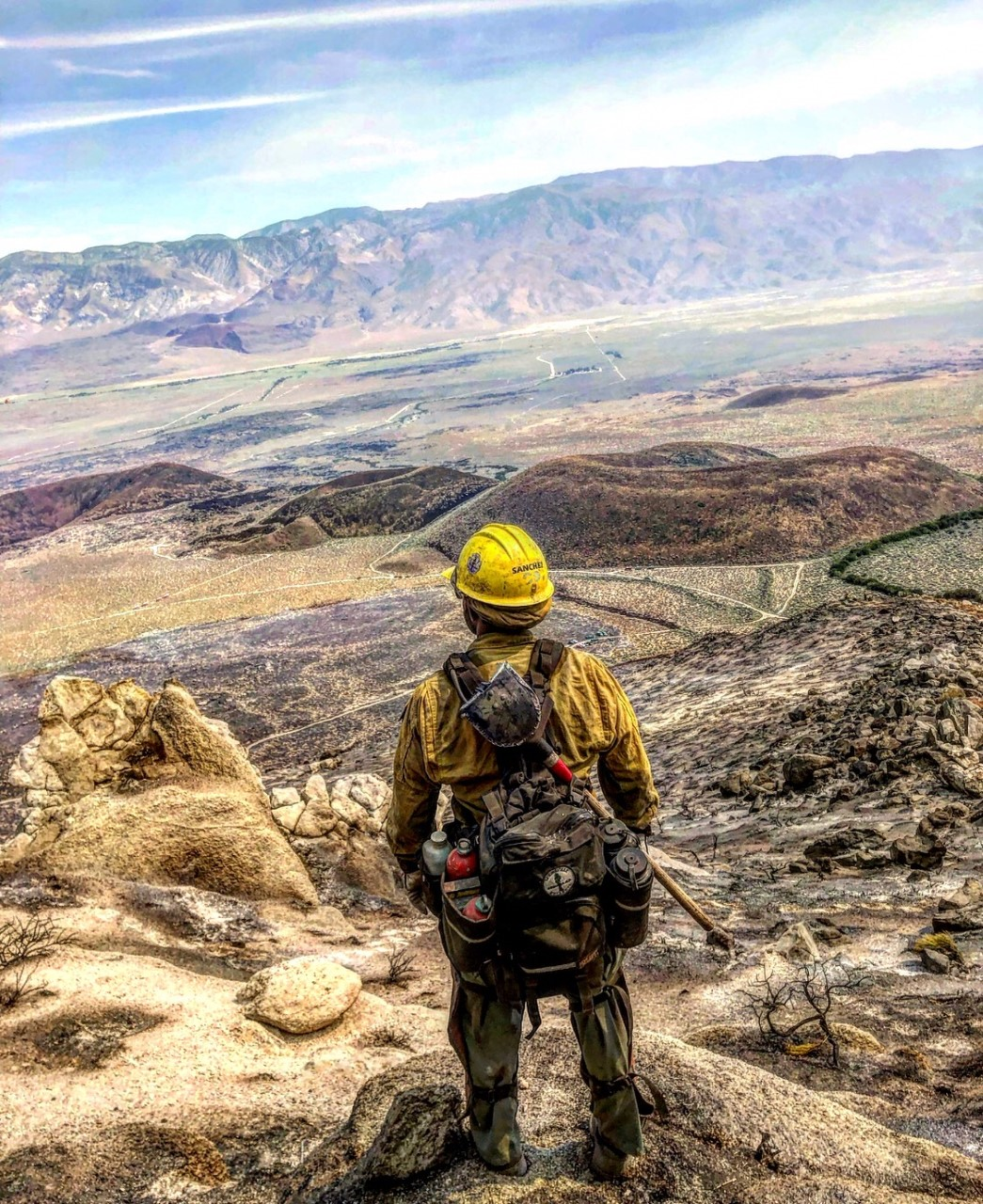
Firefighter looking out at burn scar

The Taboose Fire caused trail, road and campground closures in Inyo National Forest, Sequoia National Park and Kings Canyon National Park. On September 8, the National Forest used helicopters to evacuate hikers on the Red Lake Trail and four vehicles were destroyed at the Red Lake Trailhead parking lot. The communities of Aberdeen and Birch Creek underwent mandatory evacuations.
