= Boulder Fire (2023) =

2023 wildfire near Mount Hood, Oregon

- Date: July 8, 2023 – present
- Location: Mount Hood, Wasco County, Oregon

Statistics
- Burned area: 233 acres (94 ha)

Ignition
- Cause: under investigation

The Boulder Fire was a wildfire that burned near Mount Hood, Oregon in Wasco County. Ignited on July 8, 2023, the cause of the fire is still under investigation.

== History ==
The fire began near Mount Hood, Oregon on July 8, 2023. It was contained by August 31, 2003 and burned approximately 233 acres

== Cause ==
The cause of the fire is currently unknown and under investigation.

== Impact ==
Boulder Lake campground, Little Boulder Lake, Bonney Meadow campground, Badger Lake campground, Camp Windy, and Post Camp campground near Mount Hood were under Level 3 Go Now evacuations.
