= 2019 California power shutoffs =

United States power outages

- Date: October 9, 2019 – November 20, 2019 (1 month, 1 week and 4 days)
- Location: California
- Type: Power outage
- Cause: Wildfire risk due to strong winds
- Deaths: 1

The 2019 California power shutoffs, known as public safety power shutoff (PSPS) events, were massive unplanned precautionary power shutoffs that occurred in approximately 30 counties in Northern California and several areas in Southern California from October 9 to November 1, 2019, and on November 20, 2019, by Pacific Gas and Electric Company (PG&E), Southern California Edison (SCE), and San Diego Gas & Electric (SDG&E).

The power shutoffs were an attempt to prevent wildfires from being started by electrical equipment during strong and dry winds. The shutoffs initially affected around 800,000 customer accounts or about 2.5 million people, but expanded to cause over 3 million people to lose utility-provided electrical power by late October as more utility companies from around the state also did preemptive power shutoffs.

The shutdowns have drawn widespread fierce backlash and criticism from residents as well as government officials as PG&E, SCE, SDG&E and the California Public Utilities Commission issued an apology. Many residents complained of either being misinformed or not informed when shutdowns would occur, while officials such as California governor Gavin Newsom blamed the shutdowns on PG&E's "greed and mismanagement." Some people expressed their frustrations through vandalism and violence, including the egging of a PG&E office's front doors and someone shooting at a PG&E vehicle.

For the state's largest utility, PG&E, to bury all of its distribution lines (relatively low voltage lines which bring power to homes, not the higher voltage transmission lines) would cost US$15,000 per customer.

== Background ==
The "Public Safety Power Shutoff" (PSPS) has been standard practice in California for many years, though in the past, the preemptive shutoffs occurred predominantly in rural areas. PG&E warned the state for months of its impending action, set to commence when the combination of high autumn winds and dry conditions made the fires more likely to happen. PG&E began its series of power blackouts in the San Francisco Bay Area on Wednesday, October 9, at around 12 AM PDT in order to reduce the risks of devastating wildfires caused by PG&E's power lines or equipment, like the October 2017 Northern California wildfires and the 2018 Camp Fire, responsible for a combined total of 95 deaths.

As California's population has continued to grow in suburban and exurban areas that were formerly wilderness, the risk and size of fires has escalated. More than a third of California's housing is now located in areas known as wildland–urban interface. When wildfires happen upon these communities, they become more dangerous and leap from structure to structure in what is called "fast-moving urban conflagrations" that firefighters find difficult to stop.

== Legal setting ==
Besides safety, one of the reasons behind PG&E's (now moving into bankruptcy) imposition of the blackouts is a legal doctrine known as inverse condemnation, which makes California utilities responsible for wildfire destruction regardless of whether the utility acted negligently or not. California's interpretation of inverse condemnation is unique. The tenet is applied in other states, usually to government entities that damage private property when engaged in a public service. California's courts have ruled the principle can be applied to utilities. So, the utilities are held liable for damage, even if they comply with all of California's strict energy-related rules.

This policy resulted in $30B of liability for PG&E from the 2017 & 2018 fires and drove it to bankruptcy proceedings. In July 2019, a new $21 billion wildfire trust fund was created to pay for damages from future wildfires, started with a 50-50 balance of utility and customer monies and also reduced the liability threshold for utilities to where customers must prove negligence before companies are held liable.

Critics of inverse condemnation point out that it can lead to utility bankruptcies which can threaten the integrity of the California power grid as well as hurt financing the states' efforts for renewable energy and against climate change, one of the causes of the intensified fire threat.

In addition to court cases in recent years and the evolution of case law which have made new standards of legal liability, the California State legislature and the Governor also enacted new statutory laws to modify the legal regime under which electrical utilities operate in California. Over 20 new wildfire-related laws were enacted in the 2019 legislative session, several of them affecting the electrical service providing utility companies.

== Undergrounding ==
The fire risk from the electricity supply is principally from the large amount of energy carried in above-ground power lines, which under fault conditions can become a factor in the ignition of wildfires. Public utilities in the state of California have a total of 26,000 miles (42,000 km) of high voltage transmission lines, and 240,000 miles (390,000 km) of distribution lines.

Distribution lines bring electricity directly to homes; two thirds of them statewide are above ground. For transmission lines, the cost of constructing these underground is approximately US$80 million per mile while for distribution lines, the construction cost of new underground lines is about US$3 million per mile, compared to overhead lines at about $800,000 per mile.

The state's largest utility, PG&E, has 107,000 miles (172,000 km) of distribution lines, 81,000 miles (130,000 km) of which are overhead. The cost to convert all of PG&E's overhead distribution lines to underground lines would be approximately US$240 billion, or roughly US$15,000 per PG&E customer. (This cost estimate is only for distribution lines, not the higher voltage transmission lines.)

== Timeline ==
- Several hundred miles to the south of San Francisco, San Diego Gas & Electric shut off power to approximately 400 customers in eastern San Diego County, California on Friday, October 4, 2019, due to combustion hazards posed by the first Santa Ana wind event of the fall. As of October 8, 2019, SDG&E anticipated restoring power by the following Friday, October 11.
- On Wednesday, October 9, around 12 AM PDT, PG&E began to shut off power to many regions, as a pre-emptive measure to help avoid wildfires caused by electric lines. The shutdown of nearly 25,000 miles (40,000 km) of electric lines was expected to affect more than 2 million people of PG&E's 16 million total served. Power was projected to remain off for up to several days after the high winds subside as all of the shutdown lines must be inspected for wind damage.
- On October 10, SCE cut power to 13,000 customers, (and warned 175,000 of potential power cuts depending on conditions).
- By October 11, three days into the pre-emptive blackout, winds had begun to subside and PG&E restored power to some customers, but about 500,000 out of a total of approximately 800,000 still had power cut off.
- On October 12, the first round of power shutoffs ended. A total of 738,000 customers had lost power over 35 counties from October 9–12, 2019.
- On October 22, PG&E was warning of a potential second round of preemptive shutoffs which could affect over 500,000 customers.
- On October 25, San Diego Gas & Electric had cut power to 19,000 households, potentially rising up to 50,000, in San Diego County because of a combination of high winds, high temperature, and dry conditions.
- On October 26, PG&E announced that it would be shutting off power for 940,000 customers in Northern California, again with the rationale of preventing more wildfires. This "is the second major shutoff by PG&E this month."
- On October 27, over 1 million customers and a total of over 3,000,000 individuals were affected. A total of more than 3 million people across California were without power that day.
- By October 28, Southern California Edison had shut off power to 25,000 customers and conducted notifications for up to 350,000 more in 10 counties around the greater Los Angeles area.
- On November 20, PG&E shut off power to approximately 450,000 individuals in Northern California.

== Impacts ==
A man dependent on an oxygen supply died 12 minutes after the outage started in his area on October 11. An investigation has been initiated. His family said he could not reach his battery-powered tank in time. Large numbers of other disabled people reported issues with poor communication by PG&E of when shutoffs would occur, and with the inability to power or charge electrical devices on which their wellbeing depended during shutoffs. Affected devices included ventilators, oxygen concentrators, nebulizers, dialysis machines, refrigerators for drugs such as insulin, and electrically powered beds, hoists and wheelchairs. PG&E had a list of over 30,000 customers registered on their Medical Baseline program as being vulnerable to shutoffs, but used it only as a contact list, leaving the affected disabled customers unsupported. Dependence on the Medical Baseline list meant PG&E inevitably missing many more disabled people not registered with the program. Others who were registered reported they were not contacted. PG&E also refused to give many local counties access to the Medical Baseline list, leaving them unable to check on vulnerable residents.

Under backup power on October 11, 2019 [UTC], the Mission Operations Center (MOC) at the Space Sciences Laboratory at University of California, Berkeley oversaw the deployment of a satellite launched from Cape Canaveral. Paula Milano, who helps run the Laboratory, did not want to postpone the launch saying, "If a scrub of the mission happens because of Berkeley, that's a huge black eye for us, and it's a huge public black eye for NASA." After notification on October 7, the lab began extensive preparation for the power outage.

By late October, water had been restricted for some in areas which rely on pump stations.

Sonoma–Marin Area Rail Transit commuter rail services were cancelled on October 28 and 29 due to loss of power at crossings throughout the system. Partial service as far north as Downtown Santa Rosa was restored the following day.

== Potential fires averted ==
After the early October power shutoffs, the CEO of PG&E stated that they found more than 100 cases of "wind-related damage" to the 25,000 miles of power lines they had de-energized. He also stated "More than half of PG&E's 70,000-square-mile service area in Northern and Central California is considered by state officials to be at high risk of wildfire. In 2012, that designation applied to just 15% of our service area."

By the end of October, PG&E officials told a federal judge that the power shutoffs so far helped prevent up to 56 wildfires; 44 from contact with vegetation and 12 cases of wind-caused equipment damage.

In March 2021, the CPUC presented the results of a risk analysis study conducted by Technosylva to estimate potential fire impacts that could have occurred had electric infrastructure remained energized during the Public Safety Power Shutoffs (PSPS) events managed by SDG&E, PG&E, and SCE in October 2019. The risk analysis study found the following:

- Pacific Gas and Electric: For the four October 2019 PSPS events examined, PG&E reported 662 damage incidents, 560 of which would be expected to ignite a fire, according to the analysis results. In total, 114 damage incidents were analyzed for PSPS events that occurred on Oct. 9 and Oct. 26. The PG&E damage incident with the most significant modeling results occurred on Oct. 9. Modeling shows the fire resulting from this incident could have grown to approximately 23,500 acres, with more than 2,000 buildings impacted and more than 3,300 people impacted. The area of this fire is near the location of the Carr Fire (2018), which burned more than 219,000 acres (89,000 ha).
- San Diego Gas & Electric: For the two October 2019 PSPS events examined, SDG&E reported 15 damage incidents, all of which would be expected to ignite a fire, according to the analysis results. Fires resulting from these 15 damage incidents could have burned more than 327,000 acres in San Diego County and impacted more than 34,000 people and 35,000 structures in total. Simulations were run for 13 of the damage incidents that occurred on Oct. 24 and Oct. 28
- Southern California Edison: For the five September–October 2019 PSPS events examined, SCE reported 64 damage incidents, 55 of which would be expected to ignite a fire, according to the analysis results. In total, 54 damage incidents were analyzed for PSPS events that occurred on Sept. 16, Oct. 10, Oct 16, Oct. 24, and Oct. 28–30. The SCE damage incident with the most significant modeling results occurred on Sept. 16. Modeling shows the fire resulting from this incident could have grown to approximately 15,425 acres, with more than 2,600 buildings impacted and more than 7,500 people impacted. There were six additional damage incidents reported in the same vicinity during this de-energization event, meaning there is a high probability there would have been an ignition in this location.

== Later events ==
On October 18, 2019, PG&E announced that shutoffs could continue for 10 years before they can start to reduce significantly, which was met with scorn by many California officials.

Since the 2019 shutoffs, PG&E has always been continuously trying to make improvements to its electrical utilities to minimize fire risk and reduce the number of shutoffs at the same time. However, on September 5, 2020, PG&E issued a PSPS Shutoff Watch for several regions in Northern California in anticipation of scorching temperatures and gusty winds at the end of the heat wave that could easily knock off power utilities. PG&E assured customers, though, that if shutoffs do happen, they will affect fewer customers and be shorter in duration than the 2019 shutoffs, i.e. they were aiming to restore power within 12 hours of shutting it off instead of several days.

== See also ==
- 2000–01 California electricity crisis
- 2019 California wildfires
- List of California wildfires
- List of major power outages
