= Antelope Valley =

Valley in Southern California, United States

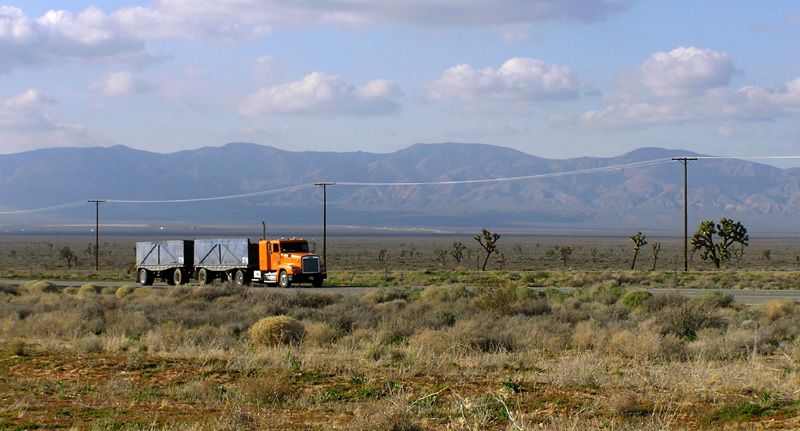
- A truck passes eastbound along SR 58 through the Antelope Valley.

- Location within California
- Area: 2,200 square miles (5,700 km^{2})

Geography
- Location: Los Angeles and Kern counties in Southern California, United States
- Population centers: Palmdale and Lancaster
- Borders on: Victor Valley, Great Basin (east); San Gabriel Mountains (south); Tehachapis (northwest); Sierra Pelona Mountains (southwest)
- Coordinates: 34.8°N 118.2°W
- Traversed by: SR 14, SR 58, SR 138
- Interactive map of Antelope Valley

The Antelope Valley is a valley primarily located in northern Los Angeles County, California, United States and the southeast portion of Kern County, and constitutes the western tip of the Mojave Desert. It is situated between the Tehachapi, Sierra Pelona, and the San Gabriel Mountains. The valley was named for the pronghorns that roamed there until they were all eliminated in the 1880s, mostly by hunting, or resettled in other areas. The principal cities in the Antelope Valley are Palmdale and Lancaster.

== Geography ==
The Antelope Valley comprises the western tip of the Mojave Desert, opening up to the Victor Valley and the Great Basin to the east. Lying north of the San Gabriel Mountains, southeast of the Tehachapis, and northeast of the Sierra Pelona Mountains, this desert ecosystem spans around 2,200 mi^{2} (5,700 km^{2}). The valley is bounded by the Garlock and San Andreas fault systems. Precipitation in the surrounding mountain ranges contributes to groundwater recharge.

=== Street grid ===
Much of the Los Angeles County portion of the Antelope Valley is laid out in streets at one-mile (1.6 km) intervals. Avenues run east–west and streets run north–south. The grid begins at Avenue A (the Los Angeles–Kern County line), with each letter avenue (B, C...) one mile apart. From Division Street, north–south streets increase by ten with each mile (10th Street West, 20th Street East...). Diagonal streets that do not follow the grid include Sierra Highway, Pearblossom Highway, and Fort Tejon Road.

== Flora and fauna ==
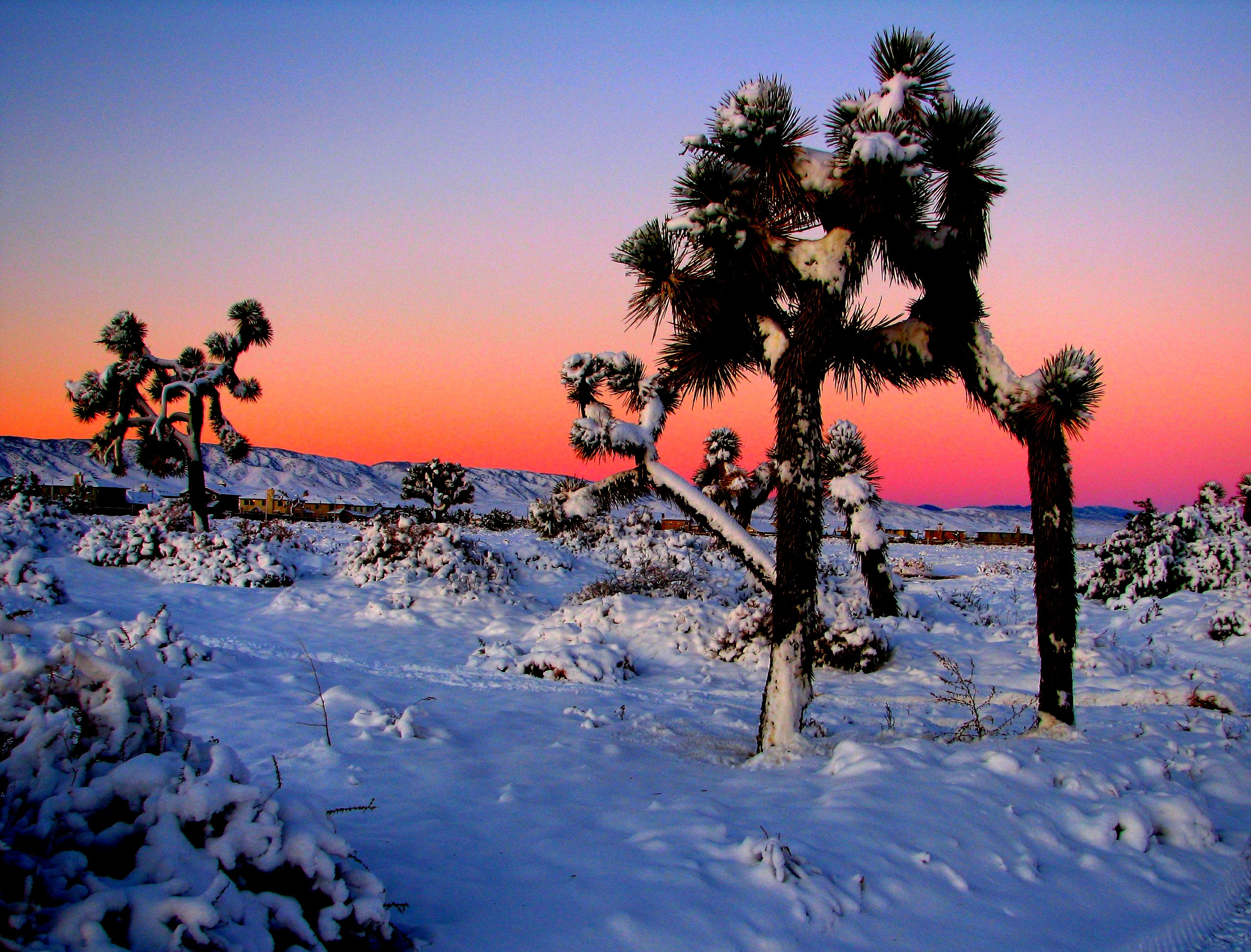
Joshua trees in snow, near Lancaster

The Antelope Valley is home to a wide range of plants and animals. This includes hundreds of plants such as the California juniper, Joshua tree, California scrub oak, creosote, and wildflowers, notably the California poppy. Winter brings much-needed rain, which slowly penetrates the area's dry ground, bringing up native grasses and wildflowers. Poppy season depends completely on the precipitation, but a good bloom can be killed off by the unusual weather in the late winter and early spring.

The Antelope Valley gets its name from its history of pronghorn grazing in large numbers. From 1882 to 1885, the valley lost 30,000 head of antelope, almost half of the species for which it was named. Unusually heavy snows in both the mountains and the valley floor drove the antelope toward their normal feeding grounds in the eastern part of the valley. Since they would not cross the railroad tracks, many of them starved to death. The remainder of these pronghorns were hunted for their hides by settlers. Once abundant, they either died off or migrated into the Central Valley. A drought in the early 1900s caused a scarcity in bunch grass, their main food source. Now, the sighting of a pronghorn is rare, although a small number remain in the western portion of the valley.

Common game species in the Antelope Valley include mule deer and mountain quail. Other common species in the Antelope Valley include the golden-mantled ground squirrel, Beechey ground squirrel, red-tailed hawk, Cooper's hawk, Stellar's jay, leopard frog, and rattlesnake.

=== Water issues ===
Human water use in the Antelope Valley depends mainly on pumping of groundwater from the valley's aquifers and on importing additional water from the California Aqueduct. Long-term groundwater pumping has lowered the water table, thereby increasing pumping lifts, reducing well efficiency, and causing land subsidence.

While aqueducts supply additional water that meets increasing human demand for agricultural, industrial, and domestic uses, diversion of water from the Sacramento-San Joaquin River Delta in northern California has caused and causes adverse environmental and social effects in the delta:

"Over decades, [the] competing uses for water supply and habitat have jeopardized the Delta's ability to meet either need. All stakeholders agree the estuary is in trouble and requires long-term solutions to ensure reliable, quality water supplies and a healthy ecosystem."

The Antelope Valley's population growth and development place considerable stress on the local and regional water systems. According to David Leighton of the United States Geological Survey:

"A deliberate management effort will be required to meet future water demand in the Antelope Valley without incurring significant economic and environmental costs associated with overuse of the ground-water resource."

== Human history ==
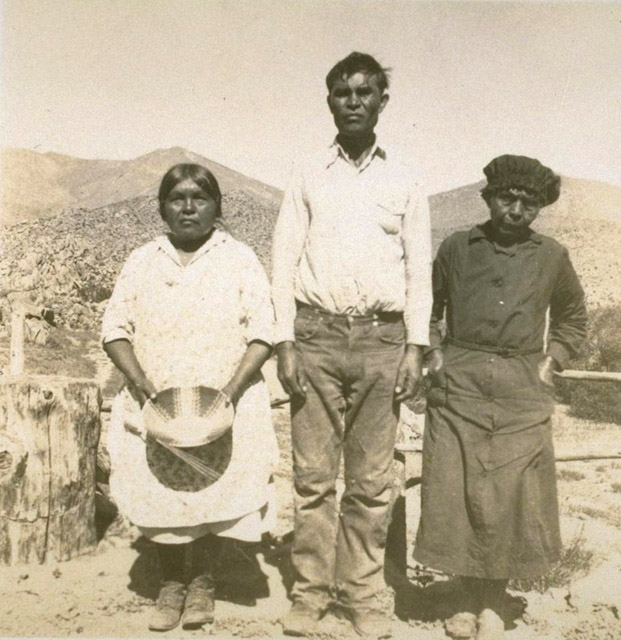
A Kawaiisu family

The first peoples of the Antelope Valley include the Kawaiisu, Kitanemuk, Serrano, and Tataviam. Europeans first entered in the 1770s, during the colonization of North America. Father Francisco Garcés, a Spanish Franciscan friar, is believed to have traveled the west end of the valley in 1776. The Spanish established El Camino Viejo through the western part of the valley between Los Angeles and the missions of the San Francisco Bay in the 1780s. By 1808, the Spanish had moved the native people out of the valley and into missions.

Jedediah Smith came through in 1827, and John C. Fremont made a scientific observation of the valley in 1844. After Fremont's visit the 49ers crossed the valley via the Old Tejon Pass into the San Joaquin Valley on their way to the gold fields. Later, a better wagon road, the Stockton – Los Angeles Road route to Tejon Pass, followed in 1854. Stagecoach lines across the southern foothills came through the valley along this wagon road, and were the preferred method for travelers before the coming of the Southern Pacific Railroad in 1876. The rail service linking the valley to the Central Valley and Los Angeles started its first large influx of white settlers, and farms and towns soon sprouted on the valley floor. The aircraft (now called aerospace) industry took hold in the valley at Plant 42 in 1952. Edwards AFB, then called Muroc Army Air Field, was established in 1933.

The area was once under Mexican rule and was named after the large herds of antelope.

== Demographics ==
In recent decades, the valley has become a bedroom community to the Greater Los Angeles area. Major housing-tract development and population growth took off beginning in 1983, which has increased the population of Palmdale around 12 times its former size as of 2006. Neighboring Lancaster has increased its population since the early 1980s to around three times its former level. Major retail has followed the population influx, centered on Palmdale's Antelope Valley Mall. The Lancaster—Palmdale urbanized area is home to 372,287 people.

Some long-term residents living far out in the desert have been cited by Los Angeles County's nuisance abatement teams for code violations, forcing residents to either make improvements or move. One of the properties is a church building that was used as a filming location for Kill Bill. The code enforcers have arrived on some of their visits in SWAT-team formats.

Hispanics and Whites make up the majority of the population.

Spanish and Tagalog are the most common foreign languages spoken in the Antelope Valley.

According to Mapping L.A., German and English were the most common ancestries and Mexico and the Philippines were the most common foreign places of birth in 2000 in Northwest Antelope Valley. Mexico and El Salvador were the most common foreign places of birth in the northwest. German and English were the most common ancestries in the northeast. German and Irish were the most common ancestries in Southeast Antelope Valley. Mexico and Colombia were the common foreign places of birth in the southeast.

== Military base ==
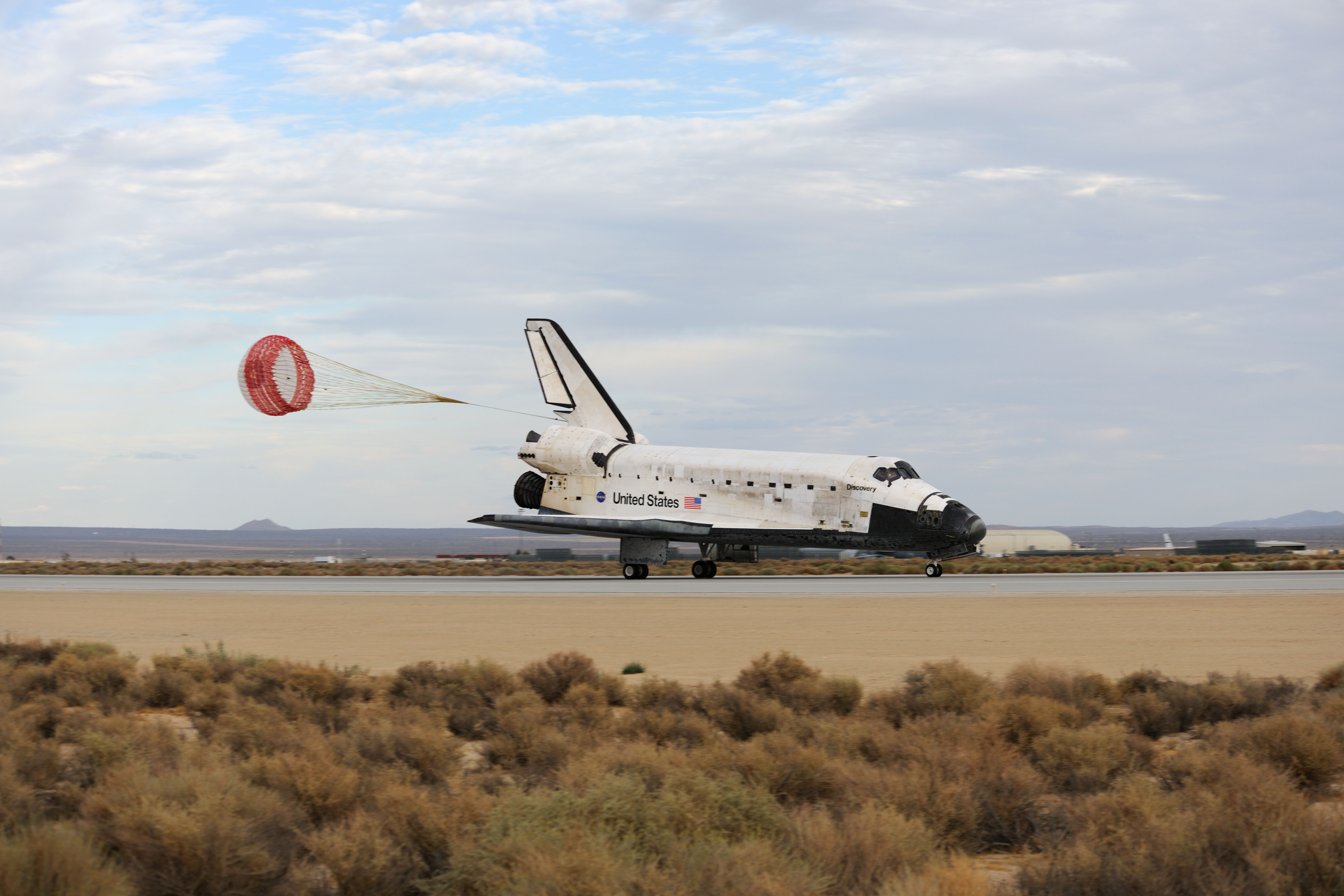
Discovery (STS-128) touches down at Edwards Air Force Base, 2009.

Edwards Air Force Base lies east of Rosamond, 37 miles (60 km) northeast of Palmdale. Edwards AFB's dry lakebeds are the lowest geographic elevation in the valley. Significant numbers of U.S. military test flights are performed there, and it has been the site of many important aeronautical accomplishments, including the first flight to break the sound barrier, accomplished by Chuck Yeager.

NASA Space Shuttles originally landed at Edwards because the lake beds offer a vast landing area. Although NASA later built a landing strip at Kennedy Space Center, Edwards was retained as the backup in case of bad weather at Cape Canaveral.

NASA Neil A. Armstrong Flight Research Center is a tenant organization at Edwards AFB. The center is best known for the X-15 experimental rocket ship program. It has been the home of NASA's high-performance aircraft research since it was founded for the X-1 program. The Space Shuttle orbiter was serviced there when it landed at Edwards.

== Industry ==
=== Aerospace ===
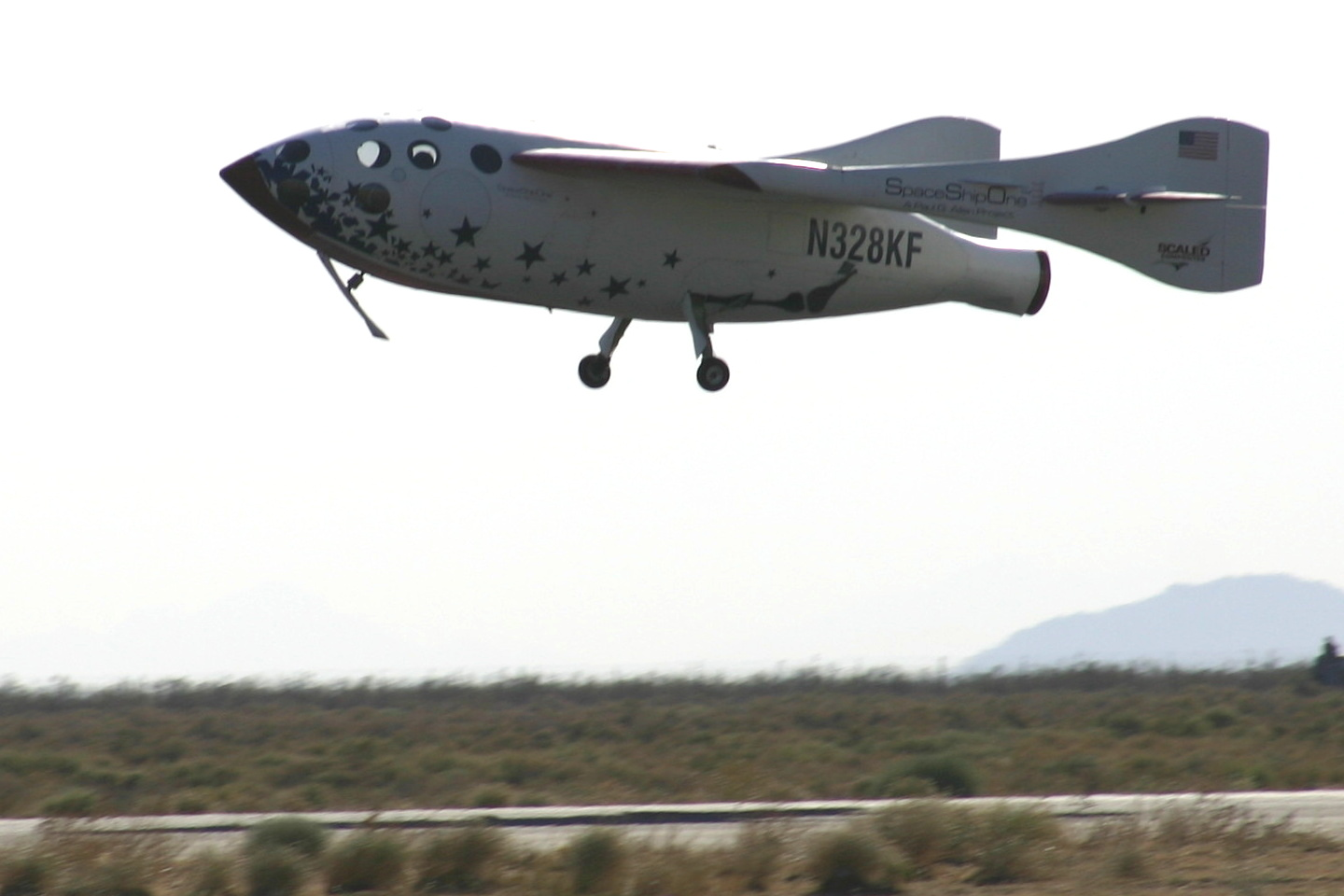
SpaceShipOne (Flight 15P) landing at Mojave Air and Space Port (June 21, 2004)

U. S. Air Force Plant 42 in northeast Palmdale is home to Lockheed Martin, Boeing, Northrop Grumman, and BAE Systems, among other aerospace-related companies. Notable projects assembled and/or designed there include the Space Shuttle orbiters, B-1 Lancer bombers, B-2 Spirit bombers, F-117 Nighthawk fighters, F-35 Joint Strike Fighters, and Lockheed L-1011 Tristar passenger jets.

This region also houses the newly dedicated Mojave Air and Space Port. The spaceport is famous as the base of operations for Scaled Composites, the company that designed SpaceShipOne and won the X-Prize.

Much of the work done at these facilities is performed in coordination with Edwards Air Force Base and the NASA Dryden Flight Research Center (see above), from the creation and testing of proof-of-concept X-planes, to Space Shuttle operations, to the manufacturing and integration and testing of new military aviation equipment.

With the size of the industry there, Antelope Valley has been nicknamed the Aerospace Valley.

=== Agriculture ===
The valley's first main industry as a part of the United States was agriculture. Historically known in the region for its extensive alfalfa fields and fruit crops, farmers now are growing a wider variety of crops, such as carrots, onions, lettuce, and potatoes. As housing tracts continue to build in the middle of the valley, the farm operations are found farther to the west and east sides than in earlier decades.

=== Electricity generation ===
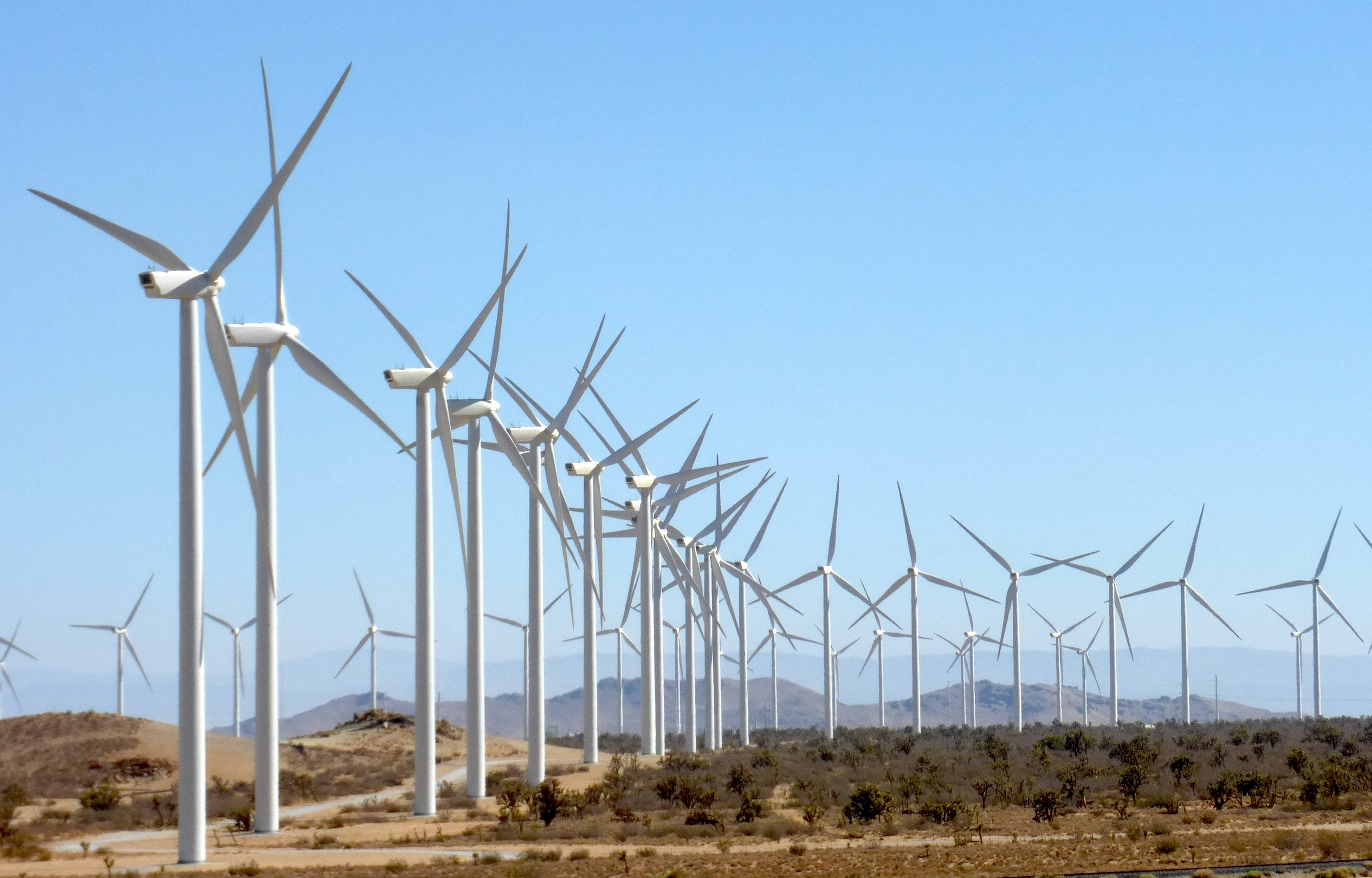
The Alta Wind Energy Center in northern Antelope Valley

The northern reaches of Antelope Valley are part of the Tehachapi Wind Resource Area, the largest wind resource area in California. The valley also has numerous solar farms, some of which are among the largest in the United States.

=== Manufacturing ===
- U.S. Pole Company Inc.
- Senior Systems Technology
- Delta Scientific
- Lance Camper Manufacturing Corporation
- Harvest Farms Inc.
- BYD Company

=== Mining ===
The world's largest open-pit borax mine is located near Boron.

== Education ==
=== Colleges and universities ===
- The Antelope Valley Community College District is the local public, regionally accredited, college system that covers the area with a primary service area of 1,945 sq mi (5,040 km^{2}) covering portions of Los Angeles and Kern Counties. Instruction is offered at multiple sites, including Palmdale and Lancaster, as well as through online and instructional television courses. It has two campuses. The main one, Antelope Valley College, is a comprehensive community college located in Lancaster. It offers associate in arts and associate in science (two-year) degrees in 67 fields, as well as certificate programs in 56 vocational areas. It also hosts a satellite location of California State University, Bakersfield-Antelope Valley, where students can obtain bachelor's and master's degrees.
- California State University Bakersfield has a satellite campus in Lancaster offering eight bachelor's degrees, five master's degrees, and the multiple, single, and special-education teaching credentials.
- University of Phoenix has a satellite campus in Lancaster.
- University of La Verne has a satellite campus in Palmdale.
- DeVry University and its Keller Graduate School of Management have a satellite campus in Palmdale.
- Chapman University has a satellite campus in Palmdale.
- The AERO Institute at the Palmdale Institute of Technology is a facility in Palmdale at the Civic Center. It is operated by NASA and the City of Palmdale, and distance learning through a number of universities is available, including Purdue, the University of Southern California, the University of San Diego, Pepperdine University, Embry-Riddle Aeronautical University, Caltech, and Cal Poly Pomona. This specialized school offers graduate and undergraduate education in aerospace science, engineering, and technical skills.
- West Coast Baptist College in Lancaster is an accredited Independent Fundamental Baptist Bible college offering graduate and undergraduate degrees in pastoral studies, evangelism, missions, church ministries, music, Christian education, youth ministry, and secretarial studies. West Coast opened in 1995, and now has about 1,000 students.
- The Lancaster University Center in Lancaster provides local students education in engineering and technology from California State University, Long Beach. The $3.5 million reconstruction of Challenger Hall, located at the old Antelope Valley Fairgrounds, gave the new campus 13 classrooms, two of which are high-tech distance-learning rooms and two of which are lab classrooms, as well as office space. The school was created through partnerships with California State University, Bakersfield, California State University, Fresno, and local aerospace companies. They offer Bachelor of Science degrees in mechanical and electrical engineering.
- University of Antelope Valley (now closed), formerly known as Antelope Valley Medical College, was a private, for-profit, incorporated company. The corporation was owned and operated by Lancaster city councilwoman, Sandra Johnson. The facility was featured on a local news report regarding payouts to local businesses that would hire or place graduated students for $2,000. UAV, INC., must place at least 65 percent of its graduates in jobs, or lose accreditation.

=== High schools ===
- The Antelope Valley Union High School District is the primary public school district covering the vast majority of high-school education in the metropolitan Palmdale and Lancaster area. The district has 25,000 students in eight regular high schools in Palmdale and Lancaster, a continuation school in each city, a trade school in Palmdale, and a specialized early college education school on the Lancaster Antelope Valley College campus. These are:
  - Antelope Valley High School - Lancaster
  - Antelope Valley Regional Occupational Program (AV ROP) - Palmdale
  - Desert Winds High School - Lancaster
  - Eastside High School - Lancaster
  - Highland High School - Palmdale
  - Lancaster High School - Lancaster
  - Littlerock High School - Littlerock, California
  - Palmdale High School - Palmdale
  - Pete Knight High School - Palmdale
  - Quartz Hill High School - Quartz Hill
  - R. Rex Parris Continuation High School - Palmdale
  - SOAR High School - Lancaster
- The Southern Kern Unified School District provides all public school education in Rosamond.
- The Muroc Joint Unified School District provides all public school education for Edwards Air Force Base, and the northern Antelope Valley communities of North Edwards, and Boron.
- The Mojave Unified School District provides all public school education in the northern Antelope Valley communities of Mojave and California City.

Also, several private and home-school high schools arein the area, most notably:

- Abraham Lincoln High School - Rosamond
- Paraclete High School
- Bethel Christian High School
- Antelope Valley Christian School - Lancaster
- Desert Christian High School
- Empowered Learning Academy - Palmdale
- Palmdale Academy Charter School
- Pearblossom High School
- Desert Sands Charter Schools - Lancaster
- Desert Sands Charter Schools - Palmdale
- Options for Youth Charter Schools - Lancaster
- Options for Youth Charter Schools - Palmdale
- The Palmdale Aerospace Academy

=== School districts ===
- The Palmdale School District is the area's largest school district, with an enrollment of over 28,000 in 29 schools. The district covers the central portion of the city.
- The Lancaster School District is the area's third largest school district after Palmdale and the A.V. High School District. This school district covers most of central and part of eastern Lancaster with 15,000 students in 19 schools.
- The Westside Union School District covers western Palmdale and Lancaster and their immediate suburbs including Quartz Hill, Del Sur, Leona Valley, and Antelope Acres. It has over 8,250 students in 11 schools.
- The Eastside Union School District covers eastern Lancaster with 3,500 students in 4 schools.
- The Keppel Union School District covers eastern Palmdale and its immediate suburbs, including the eastern Antelope Valley communities of Lake Los Angeles, Pearblossom, Littlerock, Sun Village, Llano, and Valyermo. It has 6 schools with over 3,000 students.
- The Southern Kern Unified School District provides all public school education in Rosamond.
- The Muroc Joint Unified School District provides all public school education for Edwards Air Force Base, and the northern Antelope Valley communities of North Edwards, and Boron.
- The Mojave Unified School District provides all public school education in the northern Antelope Valley communities of Mojave and California City.

== Culture ==
The Antelope Valley Symphony Orchestra is a professional ensemble that performs four concerts each year at the Lancaster Performing Arts Center. It is an auxiliary of Antelope Valley College, and performs regularly with the Antelope Valley College Civic Orchestra.

=== In popular culture ===
Antelope Valley Indian Museum State Historic Park has been featured in films such as The Magnificent Seven Ride! (1972) and The Stone Killer (1973). Mackenna's Gold (1964) was also partly filmed in Antelope Valley. The video to the R.E.M. song "Man on the Moon" was shot in Antelope Valley in October 1992.

== Parks ==
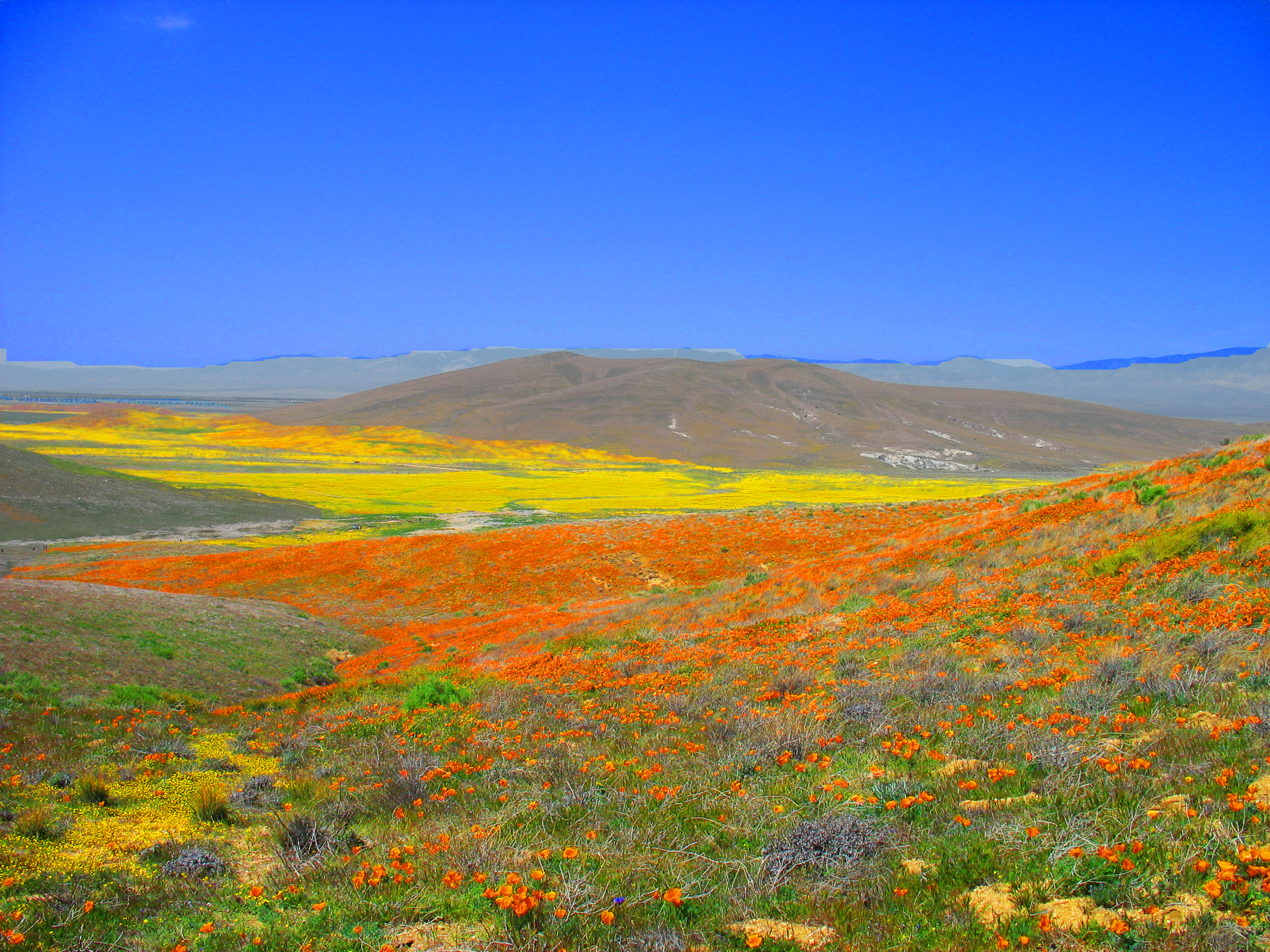
Antelope Valley California Poppy Reserve, March 2008

- Antelope Valley California Poppy Reserve, home to California's state flower
- Arthur B. Ripley Desert Woodland State Park
- Antelope Valley Indian Museum State Historic Park
- Saddleback Butte State Park
- Devil's Punchbowl County Park

== Hospitals ==
Major hospitals include:

- Antelope Valley Hospital
- Palmdale Regional Medical Center

The Antelope Valley was formerly served by a county hospital, High Desert Hospital, which was converted into an urgent care clinic in 2003 due to the county's budget problems. As a result, indigent patients with serious but non-life-threatening medical conditions must seek treatment at Olive View – UCLA Medical Center in Sylmar, which is over 50 miles (80 km) away.

== Transportation ==
=== Major highways ===
Include:

- Angeles Forest Highway, a key county road, connects Palmdale with Angeles Crest Highway as an alternate route to the Los Angeles basin.
- The Antelope Valley Freeway (State Route 14)
- State Route 18 (connects SR 138 east of Palmdale to Victor Valley and U.S. Route 395) There is currently a proposal to turn this into a freeway.
- State Route 138 (of which Pearblossom Highway comprises the eastern leg)
- State Route 58 (connects the Antelope Valley with Bakersfield and Barstow as a freeway)
- U.S. Route 395 (which technically lies east of the Valley proper)

On the ridgeline of the San Gabriel Mountains, the Angeles Crest Highway (State Route 2) snakes 60 miles (100 km) through the Angeles National Forest to La Cañada Flintridge and the Greater Los Angeles metropolitan region.

=== Rail ===
- The Union Pacific Railroad serves the Antelope Valley with freight service on their route between Palmdale and Mojave, with continuing service to points south, southeast and north. BNSF Railway serves Mojave with freight service to/from the east, and to/from Richmond, California to the northwest.
- Metrolink passenger rail service to the Los Angeles Basin and other parts of Southern California on its Antelope Valley Line at its Lancaster, Palmdale, and Vincent Grade/Acton stations.
- Amtrak passenger rail service has a commuter bus that stops at the Palmdale Transportation Center and the Lancaster Metrolink station, connecting Antelope Valley residents to the national rail network.
- The California High-Speed Rail Authority has designated Palmdale as a stop on the future rail line between San Francisco and San Diego.

=== Bus ===
- The Antelope Valley Transit Authority is the local city-bus system for metropolitan Palmdale and Lancaster. The service also operates a commuter bus network from its hubs at the Palmdale Transportation Center and the Lancaster Park & Ride to several locations in Los Angeles.
- Greyhound Bus has stops at the Palmdale Transportation Center and the Lancaster Metrolink station.

=== Airports ===
- Palmdale Regional Airport, co-sited with USAF Plant 42 is by far the largest and busiest airport in the valley and is owned by the City of Palmdale via Palmdale Airport Authority (it was previously owned by Los Angeles World Airports which owned and operated LAX up until 2013). Although mostly military flights occur at this airport, it also has an unused commercial terminal.
- General William J. Fox Airfield in Lancaster is the valley's busiest general aviation airport. It is the fourth largest airport in the valley. Charter air service and helicopter rides are available. This airport also has the valley's only aviation school.
- Inyokern Airport in Inyokern, near Ridgecrest, is a large general aviation airport with limited commercial airline service to Los Angeles International Airport, serving the northern Antelope Valley and Indian Wells Valley communities. Charter service is also available. It is the area's third largest airport.
- Mojave Air & Space Port in Mojave is a large civil aviation center and the second largest airport in the valley. Voyager and SpaceShipOne were developed and flown from its location.
- Mountain Valley Airport in Tehachapi is a gliderport, privately owned but open to the public, which offers glider training for civilian and military pilots
- Tehachapi Municipal Airport in Tehachapi is a small general aviation airport.
- Agua Dulce Airpark in Agua Dulce is a medium-sized general aviation airport.
- Rosamond Skypark Airport in Rosamond is a small general aviation airport, privately owned and operated.
- California City Municipal Airport in California City is a small general aviation airport.
- Crystalaire Airport in Llano is a small airstrip principally dedicated to glider flights.

== Notable people ==
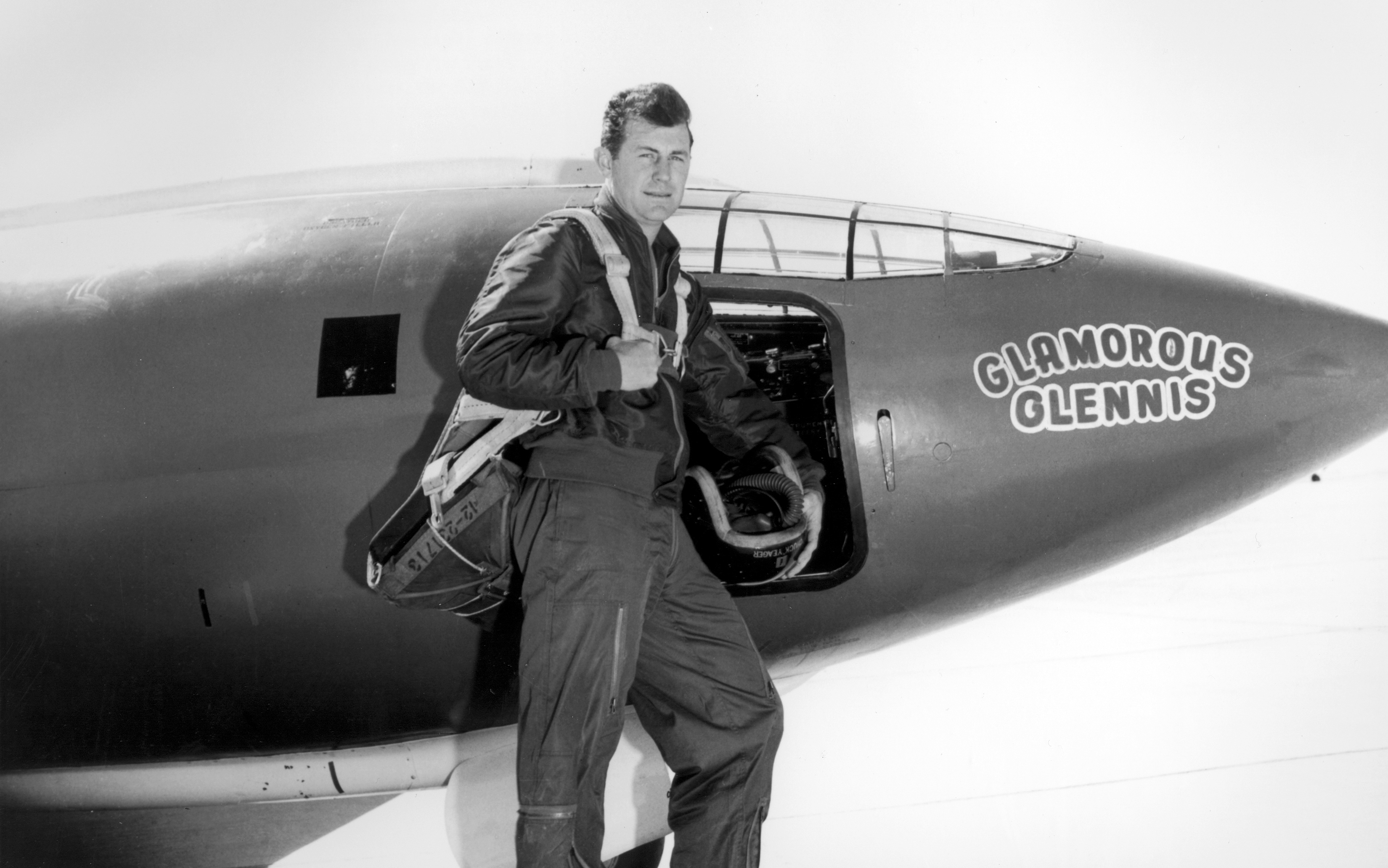
Chuck Yeager with Glamorous Glennis at Muroc, c. 1947

Some people of note have spent time in the valley, including:

- The 1990s R&B group All-4-One was from the Antelope Valley.
- Erik Audé, actor-stuntman turned professional poker player, went to Paraclete High School before transferring over to Bethel Christian.
- Pancho Barnes, the aviator and friend to the U.S. Air Force's test pilots of what is now called Edwards Air Force Base, established the celebrated Happy Bottom Riding Club near Rogers Dry Lake in 1935, later living in Cantil and Boron.
- Spade Cooley was a Western swing musician, big band leader, actor, and television personality (Willow Springs).
- Michael Deaver, former aide to Ronald Reagan, is a former Mojave resident.
- R. Lee Ermey of Full Metal Jacket and Mail Call fame was a Palmdale resident.
- Joseph Foreman, more frequently known as Afroman, lives in Palmdale.
- Daniel Fry, a contactee, attended Antelope Valley High School in Lancaster during the 1920s.
- Judy Garland, then known in the valley as Frances Gumm. As a girl, she would sing in public to her Lancaster neighbors.
- Paul George, NBA player born and raised in Palmdale, California
- Donald Glover, singer/songwriter known by his stage name Childish Gambino, was born in Edwards Air Force Base.
- Ezra M. Hamilton, a pioneer known for his role in the development of Antelope Valley, California. In 1896, he discovered gold in Rosamond, California and began a successful mining operation that spurred growth in the area. He founded and developed the nearby town of Willow Springs in 1897.
- Tippi Hedren, who made her major motion picture debut in The Birds, is an Acton resident since at least 1981 (Acton not being in the valley proper, but nearby to the south).
- Aldous Huxley drew writing inspiration from the solitude found at his Llano home. A little known children's book, The Crows of Pearblossom, is set in the valley and is the only children's book he is known to have written.
- Home to members of the punk band Killradio.
- Terence McKenna, noted writer, public speaker, philosopher, psychonaut, and ethnobotanist, graduated from Antelope Valley High School in 1965.
- Debbie Rowe, second wife of Michael Jackson lives in Palmdale, California
- Burt Rutan and his brother Dick Rutan of Scaled Composites, the firm which produced SpaceShipOne and the Voyager aerospace vehicles, work out of Mojave Air & Space Port in Mojave.
- Home to members of the punk band Slick Shoes.
- Kathleen Soliah, who achieved notoriety as a member of the Symbionese Liberation Army in the 1970s and then as a fugitive living a quiet, middle-class life in Saint Paul, Minnesota, grew up in Desert View Highlands, graduating from Palmdale High School in 1965.
- Chuck Yeager was an early USAF test pilot at Muroc Army Air Field, now Edwards Air Force Base, where he became the first to break the sound barrier on October 14, 1947.
- Frank Zappa attended Antelope Valley High School in Lancaster, graduating in 1958. He met Don Van Vliet (Captain Beefheart) there, a fellow student.

== Cities and communities ==
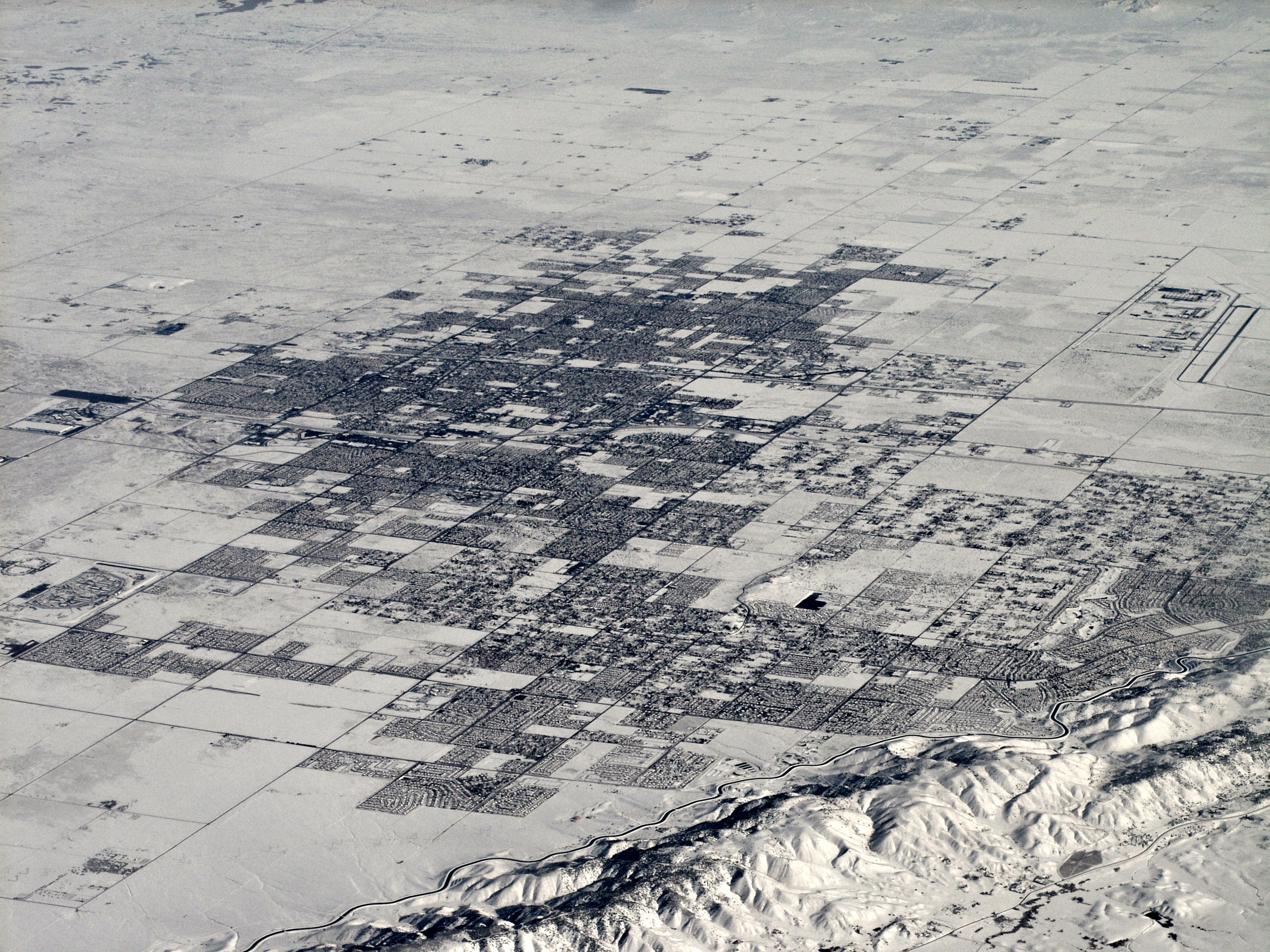
Lancaster, the largest city in the Antelope Valley, covered in several inches of snow after a winter snowstorm in December 2008

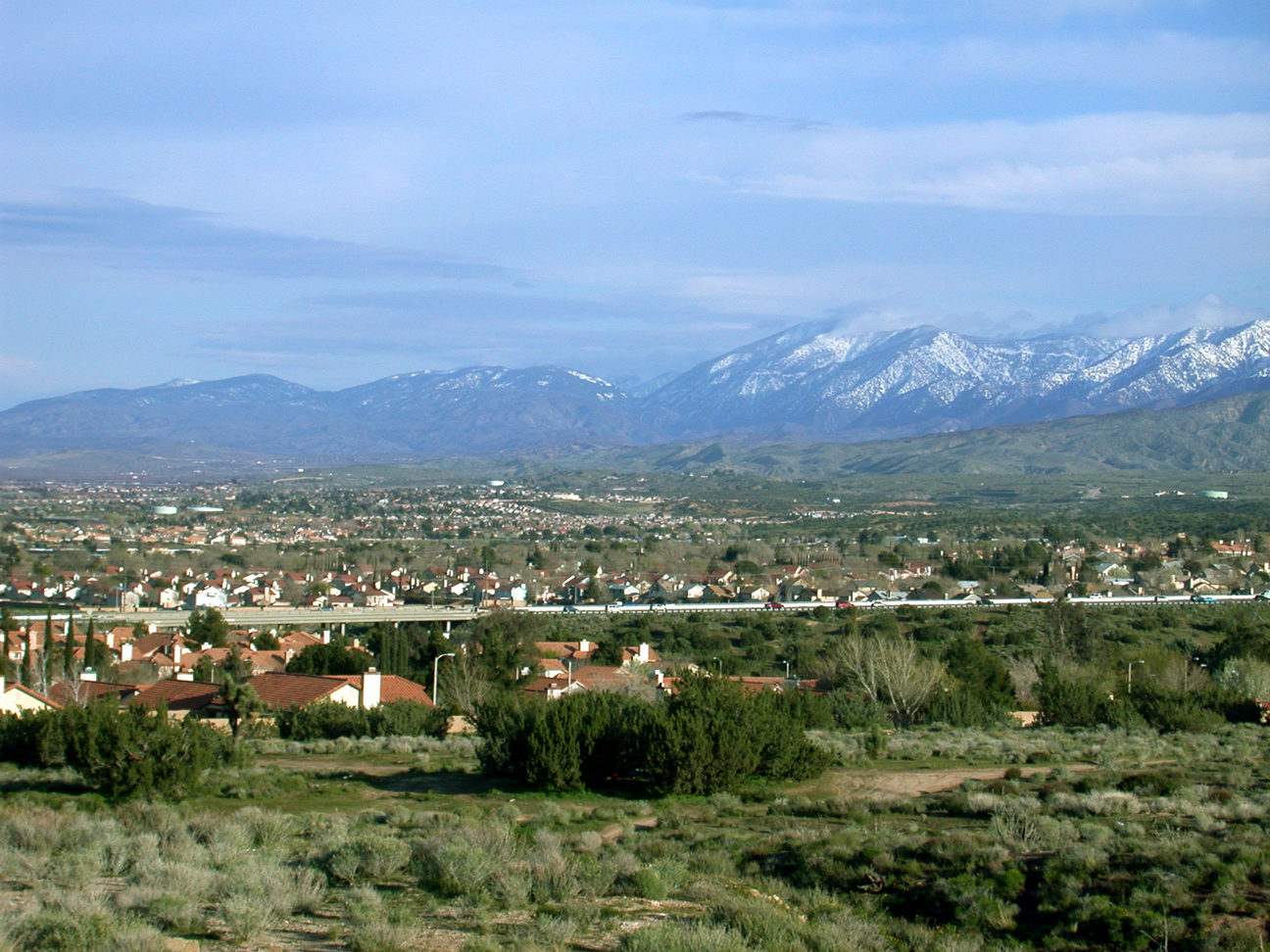
Palmdale, looking southeast toward SR 14 and the San Gabriel Mountains

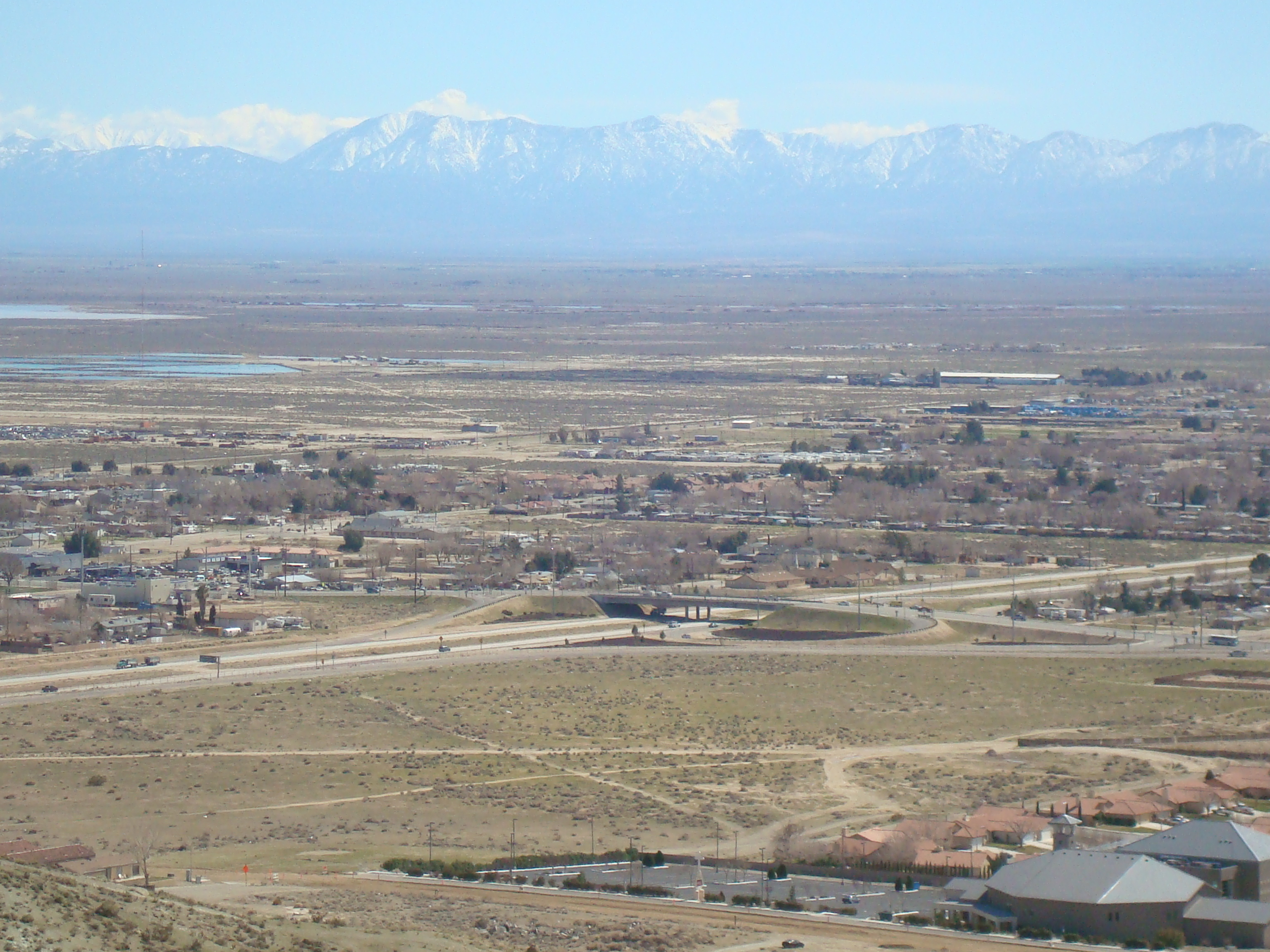
View of Rosamond, the third-largest community in the Antelope Valley

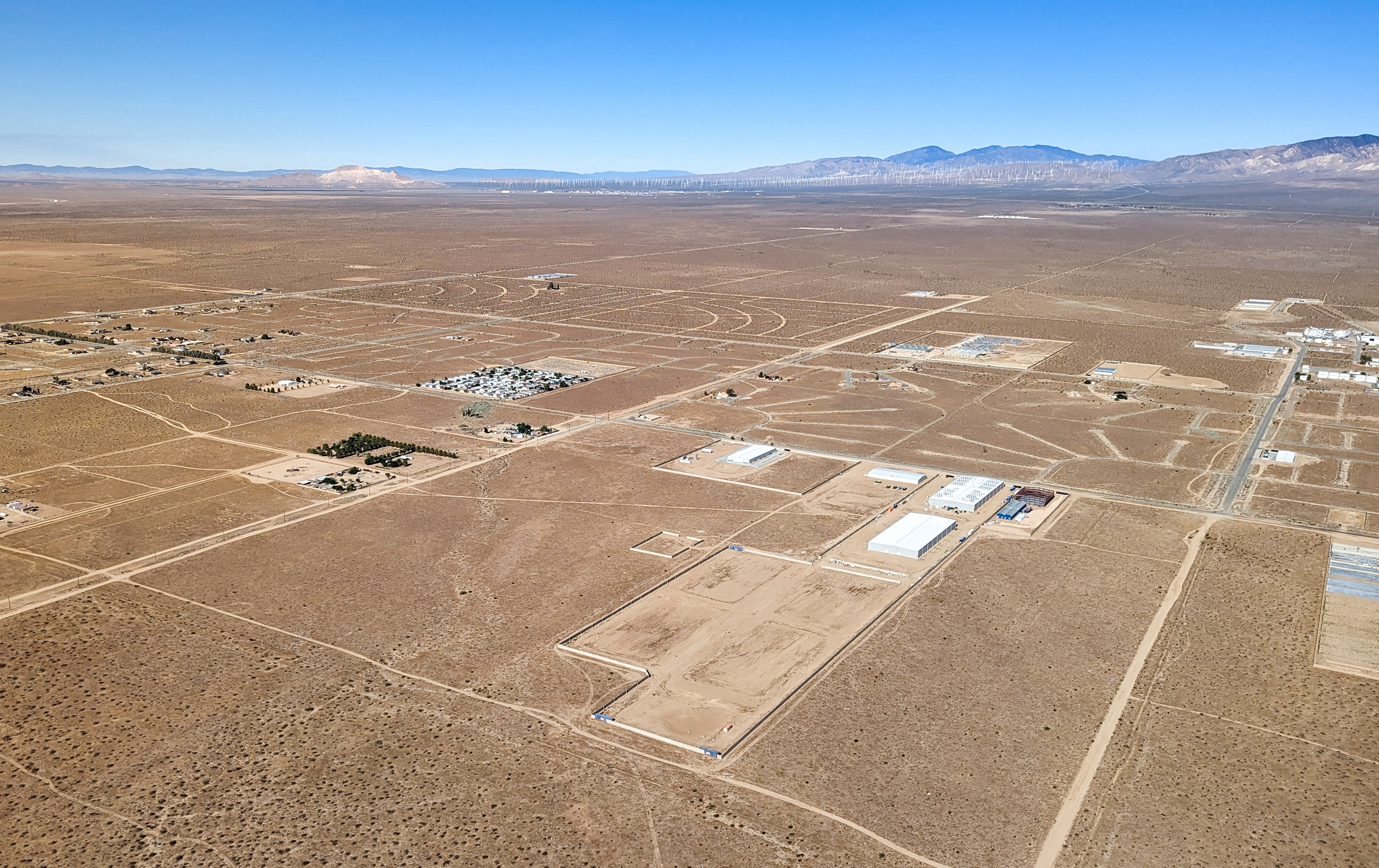
Unbuilt neighborhoods in California City, the fourth-largest community in the Antelope Valley

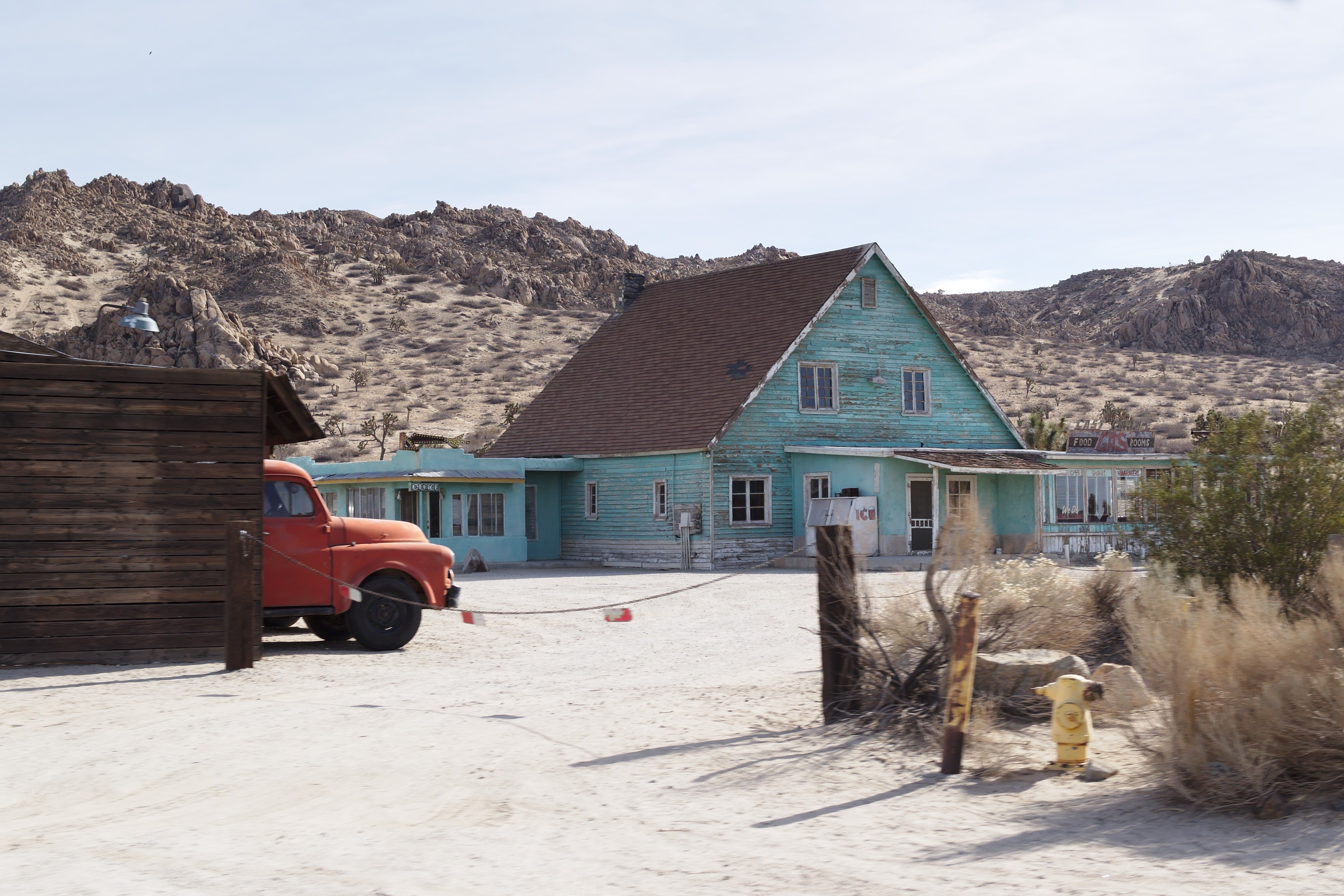
Club Ed, popular filming location in Lake Los Angeles, the fifth-largest community in the Antelope Valley

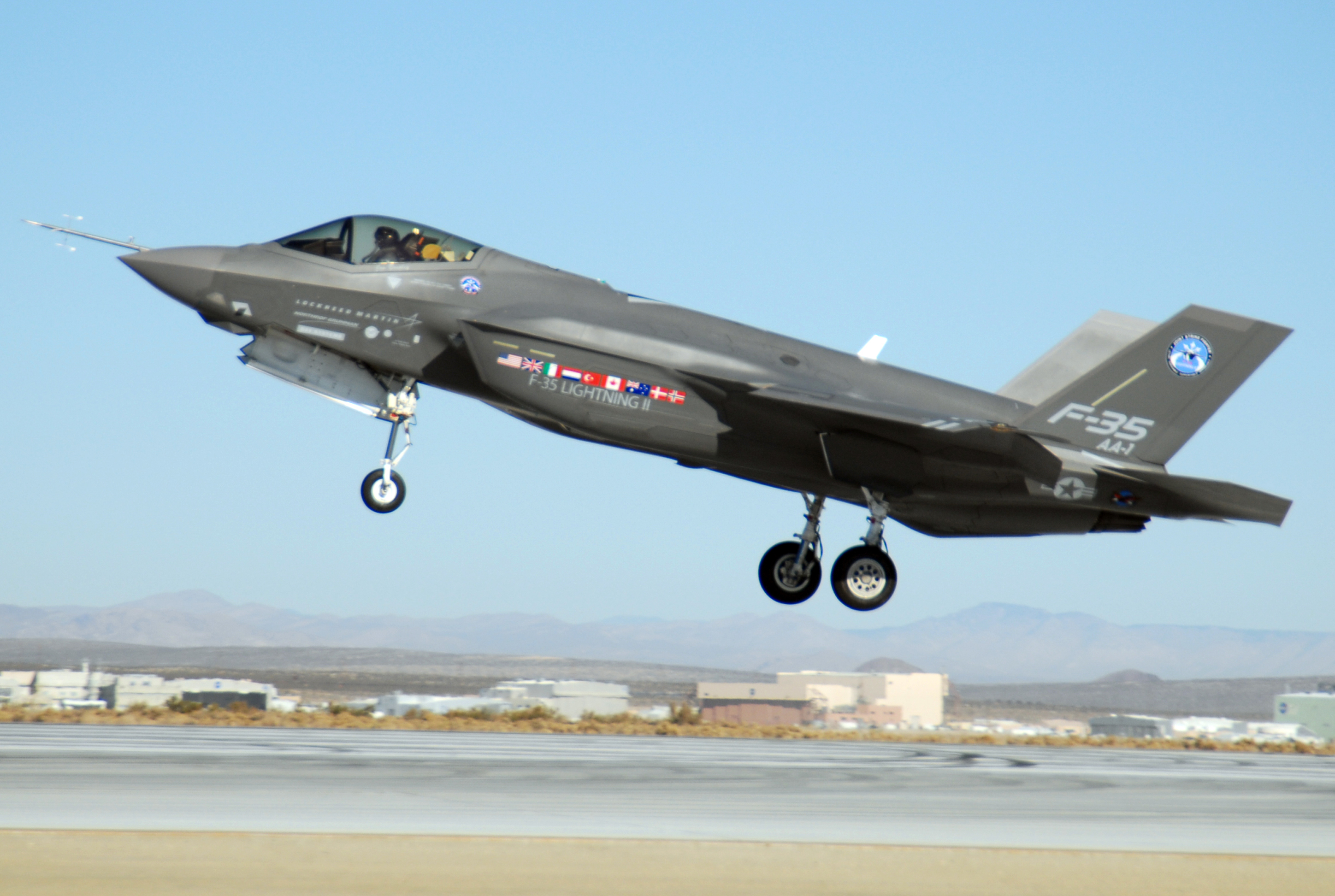
An F-35 Lightning II of the 461st Flight Test Squadron taking off at Edwards Air Force Base

Community	Type	Incorporated	Total population	ZIP Codes	Additional notes
Lancaster	Principal city	1977	173,516	93534–93536; 93539; 93584	Most populated city in the Antelope Valley
Palmdale	Principal city	1962	169,450	93550–93552; 93590–93591; 93599	Most well-known city in the Antelope Valley
California City	City	1965	14,973	93504–93505	
Acton	Census-designated place		7,431	93510	Technically located in the San Gabriel Mountains
Agua Dulce	Census-designated place		3,451	91390	Technically located in the San Gabriel Mountains
Boron	Census-designated place		2,086	93516; 93596	
Desert View Highlands	Census-designated place		2,676	93551	
Edwards Air Force Base	Militay installation; Census-designated place				
Elizabeth Lake	Census-designated place		1,756	93532	Technically located in the Leona Valley
Inyokern	Census-designated place		988	93527	Technically located in the Indian Wells Valley
Johannesburg	Census-designated place		113	93528; 93554	
Lake Hughes	Census-designated place		544	93532	Technically located in the Leona Valley
Lake Los Angeles	Census-designated place		12,328	93535; 93591	
Leona Valley	Census-designated place		544	93532	Technically located in the Leona Valley
Littlerock	Census-designated place		1,377	93543	
Mojave	Census-designated place		4,238	93501–93502; 93519	
North Edwards	Census-designated place		1,054	93523	
Piñon Hills	Census-designated place		7,258	92372	Technically located in the Victor Valley
Quartz Hill	Census-designated place		11,447	93536; 93551; 93586	
Randsburg	Census-designated place		45	93554	
Rosamond	Census-designated place		18,150	93560	
Sun Village	Census-designated place		11,302	93543	
Antelope Acres	Unincorporated community		3,059	93536	
Cantil	Unincorporated community		64	93519	
Del Sur	Unincorporated community		1,750	93536	
Hi Vista	Unincorporated community		1,056		
Juniper Hills	Unincorporated community		1,101	93543	
Llano	Unincorporated community		739	93544	
Monolith	Unincorporated community				Technically located in the Tehachapi Valley
Neenach	Unincorporated community		560	93536	
Pearblossom	Unincorporated community		2,435	93553	
Saltdale	Unincorporated community				
Valyermo	Unincorporated community		691	93563	
Willow Springs	Unincorporated community		1,784		
Wilsona	Ghost town		210		

== See also ==
- Aerospace Walk of Honor - downtown Lancaster sidewalk tribute to the U. S. Air Force flight test community.
- Antelope Valley Conservancy - a public benefit organization
