= Wilsona, California =

Wilsona
- Former settlement
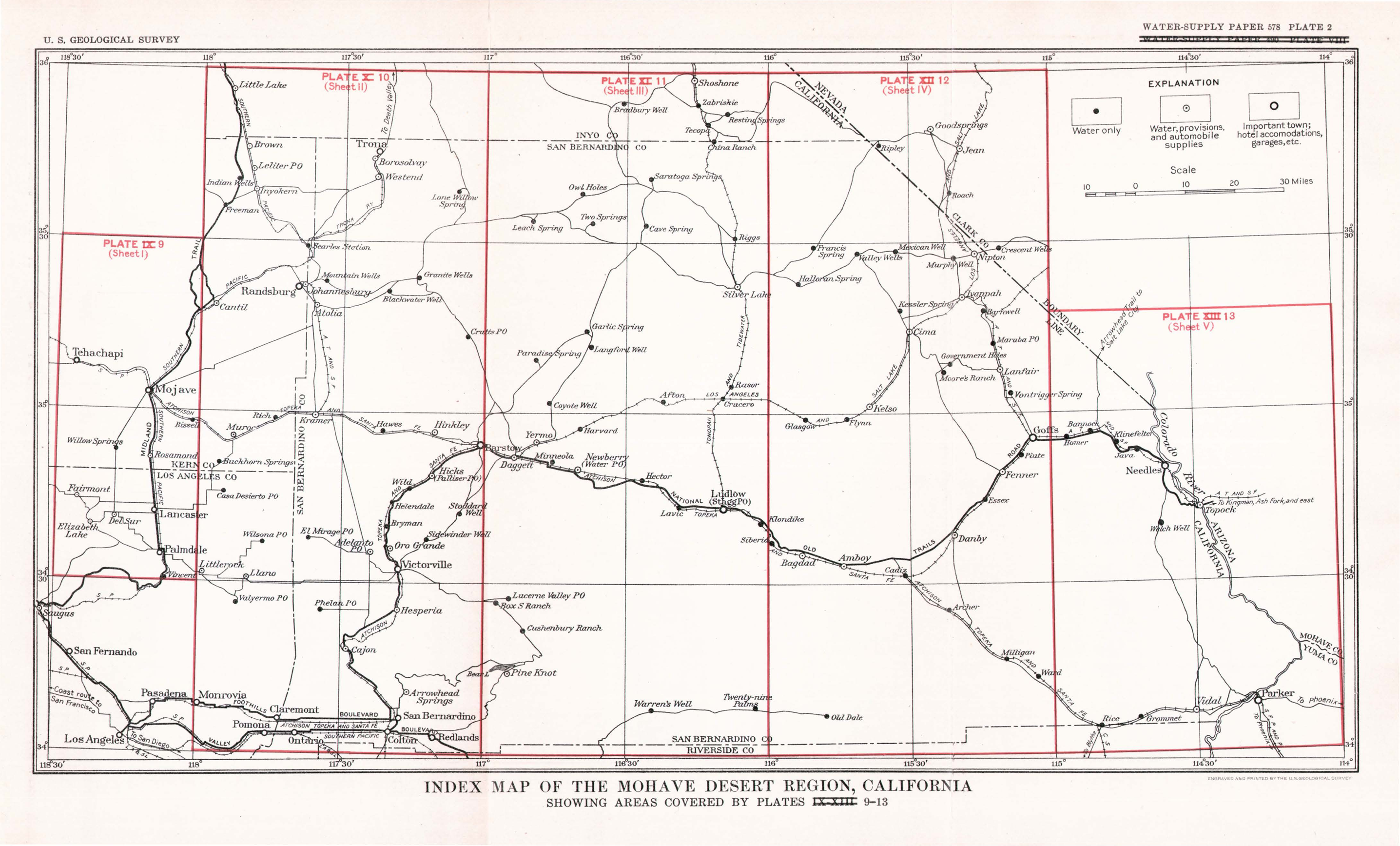
- Mohave Desert region (1929)
- Interactive map of Wilsona
- Coordinates: 34°36′53″N 117°46′08″W
- Country: United States
- State: California
- County: Los Angeles County
- Elevation: 2,726 ft (831 m)

Wilsona was a (tiny and remote) 20th-century settlement in the Antelope Valley section of Los Angeles County, California. It lay in the vicinity of Big Rock Wash, at an elevation of 2726 feet (831 m) in the far northeastern corner of the county, the near the border junction of Los Angeles, Kern, and San Bernardino Counties. Wilsona had a post office beginning in 1916 between the Llano and Gray Mountain post offices. Circa 1929, Valyermo, Llano, Wilsona, Neenach, Domino, and Muroc, were all described as "post offices that serve scattered ranches. All these communities are reached by automobile, and roads lead from the [Antelope Valley] to desert towns lying to the north and east." A 1939 guide to Los Angeles County stated "Antelope Valley has many small communities, among which are Acton, Littlerock, Fairmont, Vincent, Harold, Pearblossom, Llano, Valyermo, Wilsona, Hi Vista, Tierra Bonita, Roosevelt, Redman, Del Sur, Esperanza, Rogers, Lake Hughes, Neenach, Sandberg, and Gorman. Most of these are trading centers for populations, most of which are active either in mining or agricultural pursuits."

There was a Wilsona Road between Lancaster and Victorville–Adelanto. In the 1910s and 1920s the population of Wilsona supported a branch of the Los Angeles County Free Library in Wilsona at the Wilsona school. According to a history published 1927, the Wilsona branch "started September, 1915, in the tent house of a homesteader. In 1917 it was moved to the schoolhouse. In all, 1,729 books have been sent and 272 are now in stock. There are 66 registered borrowers. There was still a Miss Wilsona competing in the Miss Antelope Valley pageant as of 1958.

== See also ==
- Wilsona School District
