= Antelope Valley Conservancy =

Public-benefit corporation in California

Antelope Valley Conservancy is a public-benefit corporation that preserves natural habitats and watershed resources. It was founded 2005, granted 501(c)(3) and 170(b)(1)(a)(vi) tax status in 2006, absorbed the Antelope Valley Trails Recreation and Environmental Council (AVTREC) in 2007, and earned authorization from the California Department of Fish and Game to hold mitigation lands in 2008.

Antelope Valley Conservancy focuses its services in the Antelope-Fremont Valleys Watershed and upper Santa Clara River Watershed, serving three dozen communities spanning a 600-square-mile (1,600 km^{2})-area of northern Los Angeles County and southeastern Kern County, known locally as Antelope Valley. It is a diverse region, containing a wide variety of biotic communities, from Joshua tree woodlands and alkali scrub of the Mojave Desert to the scrub oak and ancient forblands of the Tehachapi Mountains.

What is called "the Antelope Valley" is a socio-economic region of rural and suburban communities, roughly bounded by the mountains that surround the watershed. In simplistic terms, the function of this closed-basin watershed is for snow melt and rain from the Tehachapi and San Gabriel Mountains to run-off downstream to the dry lakes. The flat, clay surface of the dry lakes are the heart of Edwards Air Force Base, site of innumerable historic flight tests and alternative landing site for the Space Shuttle.

Antelope Valley Conservancy is an active Stakeholder in the Integrated Regional Water Management Plan Group and the Southern California Association of Governments' Open Space Working Group. It is a member of the Land Trust Alliance and adopted the LTA Standards and Practices in 2006. Nonprofit verification for the conservancy is available at Guidestar. The Antelope Valley Conservancy sponsors research, such as the Antelope-Fremont Watershed Assessment Project (AFWAP). It also sponsors community service and environmental education activities, such as the Endangered Species Day Conference, Antelope Valley Bicycle Fun Ride, Bicycle Ride Day, Earth Day Cleanup, Trail Policy Project, Antelope Valley Bag Exchange, and presentations.
