= List of NASA field centers and launch sites =

This is a list of field centers and launch sites used by NASA.

NASA field center locations

== List ==
Field Center	Primary Location	Director
Ames Research Center	Moffett Field, California	Eugene Tu
Armstrong Flight Research Center	Edwards, California	Bradley Flick
Glenn Research Center	Cleveland, Ohio	James Kenyon
Goddard Space Flight Center	Greenbelt, Maryland	Makenzie Lystrup
Jet Propulsion Laboratory	La Cañada Flintridge, California	Laurie Leshin
Johnson Space Center	Houston, Texas	Vanessa Wyche
Kennedy Space Center	Merritt Island, Florida	Janet Petro
Langley Research Center	Hampton, Virginia	Dawn Schaible (acting)
Marshall Space Flight Center	Huntsville, Alabama	Joseph Pelfrey
Stennis Space Center	Hancock County, Mississippi	John Bailey
Vandenberg Space Force Base	Lompoc, California	
