= Aerial Acres, California =

Unincorporated community in California, United States

Aerial Acres
- Unincorporated community
- Location in California Aerial Acres (the United States)
- Coordinates: 35°05′16″N 117°47′31″W
- Country: United States
- State: California
- County: Kern
- Elevation: 2,430 ft (740 m)
- ZIP Code: 93523

Aerial Acres is an unincorporated community in Kern County, California, United States.

It is located 5.5 miles (9 km) east-southeast of Castle Butte, near the Clay Mine Road exit off State Highway 58 in Edwards, at an elevation of 2,428 feet (740 m). The US Post Office recognizes the community name in Zip Code 93523, which is shared with Edwards and North Edwards.

Aerial Acres was described in the 1990s as "a small group of homes and trailers". According to a 1997 profile of the community in The Bakersfield Californian, there were about 300 residents, half being retirees, the other half working at either U.S. Borax or Edwards Air Force Base. The article described the community as being founded by happenstance in the 1950s after it was discovered that a well dug for a sheep ranch was actually 100 feet west of the ranch property line. Since there was a water source, a developer bought a half-square mile lot and subdivided it, and it was named "Aerial Acres" because it sits 300 feet above North Edwards. Phone service was established in 1966.
