= Antelope Park =

Antelope Park may refer to:

== Canada ==
- Rural Municipality of Antelope Park No. 322, Saskatchewan, Canada

== United States ==
- Antelope Island State Park, a state park in Utah
- Antelope Valley Indian Museum State Historic Park, a park in California
