= Desert Reckoning =

2012 book by Deanne Stillman

Desert Reckoning: A Town Sheriff, a Mojave Hermit, and the Biggest Manhunt in Modern California History is a book of literary nonfiction by American author Deanne Stillman. It was first published in 2012, and then in a reprint edition in 2017. It chronicles the true story of the deadly encounter between Donald Kueck, a reclusive hermit living in the Mojave Desert, and Steve Sorensen, a respected LA County town sheriff, which sparked one of California's largest and most complex manhunts in modern history.

== Background and synopsis ==
The book is based on Stillman's Rolling Stone article "The Great Mojave Manhunt," which was reprinted in Best American Crime Writing in 2006. Over several years, Stillman investigated the events leading up to Sorensen's murder by Kueck, as well as the subsequent search for Kueck, which drew widespread attention due to its scale and dramatic desert setting. The story unfolds against the backdrop of the high Mojave Desert in the Antelope Valley north of LA and delves into the unique subcultures and communities that inhabit the region.

== Reception ==
The book received positive reviews in Kirkus Reviews, Publishers Weekly, and the Denver Post. Desert Reckoning won the 2013 Spur Award for Best Western Nonfiction (Contemporary), presented by the Western Writers of America. It has been cited by Newsweek as one of the finest recent nonfiction books about the desert. It received endorsements from writers such as Gustavo Arellano, DJ Waldie, Jo-Ann Mapson, and James Brown.
