= Muroc, California =

Muroc
- Former settlement
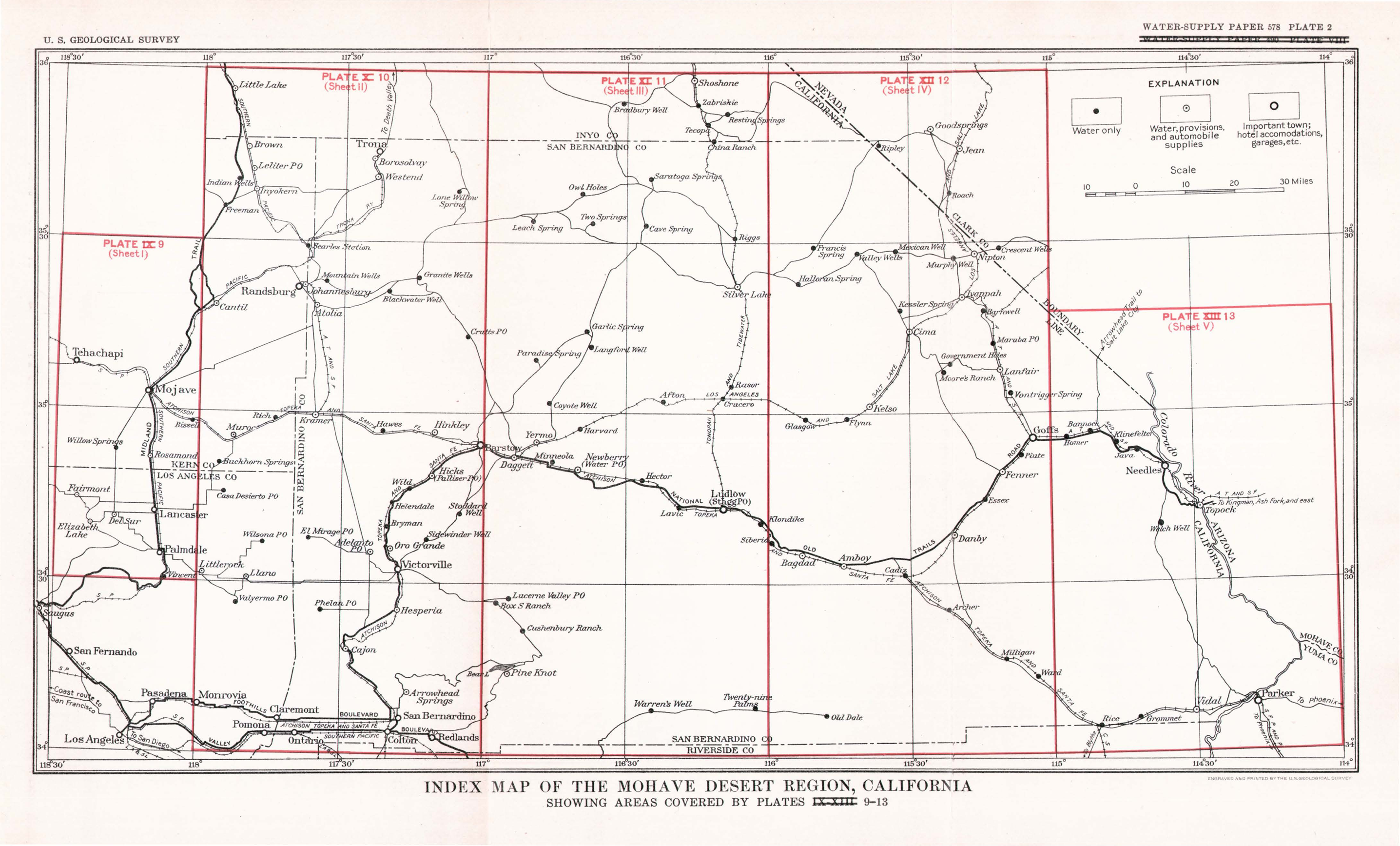
- Mojave Desert, 1929, including Muroc along the Santa Fe rail line
- Interactive map of Muroc
- Coordinates: 34°55′23″N 117°52′20″W
- Country: United States
- State: California
- County: Kern
- Elevation: 2,283 ft (696 m)

Muroc (also known as Rogers, Rod, Yucca, and Rodriguez) is a former settlement in Kern County, California, United States, in the Mojave Desert.

It was located on Rogers Dry Lake, 3 miles (4.8 km) east of Edwards, at an elevation of 2283 feet (696 m). Circa 1929, Valyermo, Llano, Wilsona, Neenach, Domino, and Muroc, were all described as "post offices that serve scattered ranches. All these communities are reached by automobile, and roads lead from the [Antelope Valley] to desert towns lying to the north and east."

Muroc still appeared on maps as of 1942. Muroc's site is now on Edwards Air Force Base. After World War II Muroc served as an important test flight location; in 1947 Chuck Yeager broke the sound barrier in the Muroc vicinity.

A post office operated at Muroc from 1910 to 1951. The name honors early settlers Ralph and Clifford Corum — their surname spelled backwards is "Muroc".

== See also ==
- Muroc Army Air Field
