= Southern Kern Unified School District =

School district in California, United States

Address
- 2601 Rosamond Boulevard Rosamond, California, 93560; United States

District information
- Type: Public
- Grades: K–12
- NCES District ID: 0637620

Students and staff
- Students: 3,366
- Teachers: 159.12
- Staff: 186.34
- Student–teacher ratio: 21.15

Other information
- Website: www.skusd.k12.ca.us

The Southern Kern Unified School District is a school district in Kern County that serves the unincorporated Northern Antelope Valley communities of Rosamond and Willow Springs, California (USA).

The Southern Kern Unified School District has 8 schools:

- 2 elementary schools
- 1 junior high school
- 1 high school
- 2 independent study also known as home schools
- 2 alternative education schools

== List of schools ==
=== Elementary schools ===
- Rosamond Elementary School
- Westpark Elementary School

=== Junior high schools ===
- Tropico Middle School

=== High schools ===
- Rosamond High School

=== Independent Study ===
- Abraham Lincoln Independent Study
- Home Choice

=== Alternative Education Schools ===
- Opportunity Middle School
- Rare Earth High School

== See also ==
- List of school districts in California
- Muroc Joint Unified School District
- Mojave Unified School District
