= Antelope Acres, California =

Unincorporated community in California, United States

- Unincorporated community
- Location within Los Angeles County

- Location in Los Angeles County
- Coordinates: 34°45′16″N 118°17′22″W
- Country: United States
- State: California
- County: Los Angeles
- Elevation: 2,425 ft (739 m)
- Time zone: UTC-8 (Pacific (PST))
  - Summer (DST): UTC-7 (PDT)
- ZIP code: 93536
- GNIS feature ID: 269546

Antelope Acres is an unincorporated community in Los Angeles County, California, United States. It lies at an elevation of 2425 feet (739 m).

Antelope Acres is located in the Antelope Valley, a high desert valley split between northern Los Angeles County and southeastern Kern County, approximately 13 miles (21 kilometers) from downtown Lancaster and 64 mi (103 km) from downtown Los Angeles. The community has a population of approximately 2,800. It is a rural community centered south of California State Highway 138 (Avenue D) near 90th Street West.

The community has become the home to many commuters who work in nearby cities; however, it still maintains a significant agricultural presence with livestock, field crops, and a local chapter of the 4H club. It also offers an open landscape for outdoor enthusiasts.

== Services ==
Being a rural community, municipal services are minimal with many emergency services coming from nearby Lancaster. The community supports a small grocery store (with an 8 pump gas station), a church, a feed/hardware store, a local internet provider, a volunteer fire station, a high end restaurant Iron Cactus and a Mexican style food restaurant.

== Geography ==
Antelope Acres is located about 13 miles (21 km) northwest of Lancaster and roughly 64 miles (103 km) from downtown Los Angeles. The topography is essentially flat desert scrubland. The Antelope Valley California Poppy Reserve lies to the west of Antelope Acres.
