= Secret Service =

Secret Service may refer to:

- Secret service, various kinds of police or intelligence organizations
  - United States Secret Service, a federal law enforcement agency tasked with investigative and protective responsibilities
  - Confederate Secret Service, a number of secret service operations by the Confederate States of America (1861–1865)
  - South African Secret Service, an intelligence agency

== Radio, film, and television ==
- Secret Service (American TV series), a 1990s television series
- Secret Service (British TV series), an espionage drama television series
- The Secret Service, a 1969 British children's television series
- Secret Service (1919 film), a lost American silent film
- Secret Service (1931 film), an American Civil War spy film starring Richard Dix
- Kingsman: The Secret Service, a 2014 spy action-comedy film starring Taron Egerton
- Gordon Ramsay's Secret Service

== Video and arcade games ==
- Secret Service (2001 video game)
- Secret Service (2008 video game)
- Secret Service 2, a 2003 video game
- Secret Service (pinball), a 1988 pinball machine by manufacturer Data East

== Music ==
- Secret Service (band), a Swedish pop group of the 1980s
- "The Secret Service", a song by Irving Berlin
- Kingsman: The Secret Service (soundtrack), the soundtrack to the 2014 film
- The Secret Service (album), a 2015 album by the Hoosiers

== Print ==
- The Secret Service (comics), later Kingsman: The Secret Service, a 2012–2013 comic book miniseries by Mark Millar and Dave Gibbons
- Secret Service (magazine), a 1993–2001 Polish gaming monthly

== See also ==
- Australian Secret Intelligence Service
- Canadian Security Intelligence Service
- Secret Intelligence Service, a British intelligence agency better known as MI6
- Intelligence Bureau (India), Indian internal intelligence agency
- Research and Analysis Wing, Indian external intelligence agency
- List of intelligence agencies
- On Her Majesty's Secret Service (disambiguation)
