= Pearblossom, California =

Unincorporated community in California, United States

- Unincorporated community
- Location within Los Angeles County

- Location in the United States
- Coordinates: 34°30′23″N 117°54′32″W
- Country: United States
- State: California
- County: Los Angeles
- Elevation: 3,150 ft (960 m)
- Time zone: UTC-8 (Pacific (PST))
  - Summer (DST): UTC-7 (PDT)
- ZIP codes: 93553
- Area code: 661

Pearblossom locally /ˈpɛərblɒsəm/ is an unincorporated community located in the Antelope Valley of the Mojave Desert, in northern Los Angeles County, California, United States.

The town has a population of 2,435. The ZIP Code is 93553 and the community is served by area code 661. According to the Greater Antelope Valley Economic Alliance report of 2009, the Palmdale / Lancaster urbanized area has a population of 483,998, of which Pearblossom is a part.

== Geography ==
Pearblossom is located about 15 miles (24 km) southeast of Palmdale in the Antelope Valley portion of southern California. The name Pearblossom came from the multitude of local pear farms along the southern ridge of the Antelope Valley. A few still exist today, but most of those farms are now abandoned and have returned to the desert landscape or have been overridden by small-scale housing development.

Pearblossom is also a popular destination, for its annual Duck Races; convenient location for hiking in the foothills; and picturesque photo opportunities.

Pearblossom is well known by Southlanders as the site of one of the most dangerous roads in the US. State Route 138 (Pearblossom Highway) is the main street in Pearblossom and as of 2004 has been the location of numerous serious and fatal automobile accidents in its Palmdale to I-15 segment. Daily traffic on the recently expanded highway ranges from 25,000 to 30,000 vehicles, including many short and long haul freight trucks. Overuse of Pearblossom Highway is chiefly on Friday evenings, Saturdays and Sundays, the time period many use the route to travel to Las Vegas. This section of 138's route is commonly used as a bypass of the Los Angeles Metropolitan region, and as a route from the Antelope Valley to the Inland Empire. Highway 138 or Pearblossom Highway has been somewhat improved, now with three or four lanes along some segments, and some of the dips taken out of the highway in many of the most dangerous areas.

=== Climate ===
Climate data for Pearblossom, California (1991–2020 normals, extremes 1985–present)
| Month | Jan | Feb | Mar | Apr | May | Jun | Jul | Aug | Sep | Oct | Nov | Dec | Year |
|---|---|---|---|---|---|---|---|---|---|---|---|---|---|
| Record high °F (°C) | 76 (24) | 82 (28) | 88 (31) | 93 (34) | 104 (40) | 109 (43) | 111 (44) | 109 (43) | 109 (43) | 100 (38) | 86 (30) | 78 (26) | 111 (44) |
| Mean daily maximum °F (°C) | 59.7 (15.4) | 62.8 (17.1) | 68.7 (20.4) | 75.0 (23.9) | 83.6 (28.7) | 93.0 (33.9) | 98.7 (37.1) | 98.0 (36.7) | 91.4 (33.0) | 79.8 (26.6) | 67.4 (19.7) | 58.1 (14.5) | 78.0 (25.6) |
| Daily mean °F (°C) | 48.6 (9.2) | 50.8 (10.4) | 55.6 (13.1) | 60.2 (15.7) | 68.1 (20.1) | 76.9 (24.9) | 83.1 (28.4) | 82.5 (28.1) | 76.5 (24.7) | 66.5 (19.2) | 55.2 (12.9) | 47.3 (8.5) | 64.3 (17.9) |
| Mean daily minimum °F (°C) | 37.5 (3.1) | 38.9 (3.8) | 42.4 (5.8) | 45.5 (7.5) | 52.7 (11.5) | 60.7 (15.9) | 67.5 (19.7) | 67.0 (19.4) | 61.6 (16.4) | 53.1 (11.7) | 43.0 (6.1) | 36.4 (2.4) | 50.5 (10.3) |
| Record low °F (°C) | 15 (−9) | 17 (−8) | 27 (−3) | 28 (−2) | 34 (1) | 38 (3) | 46 (8) | 46 (8) | 37 (3) | 32 (0) | 23 (−5) | 8 (−13) | 8 (−13) |
| Average precipitation inches (mm) | 1.20 (30) | 1.61 (41) | 0.96 (24) | 0.33 (8.4) | 0.25 (6.4) | 0.04 (1.0) | 0.15 (3.8) | 0.14 (3.6) | 0.20 (5.1) | 0.27 (6.9) | 0.45 (11) | 1.15 (29) | 6.75 (171) |
| Average snowfall inches (cm) | 0.2 (0.51) | 0.0 (0.0) | 0.0 (0.0) | 0.0 (0.0) | 0.0 (0.0) | 0.0 (0.0) | 0.0 (0.0) | 0.0 (0.0) | 0.0 (0.0) | 0.0 (0.0) | 0.2 (0.51) | 0.6 (1.5) | 1.0 (2.5) |
| Average precipitation days (≥ 0.01 in) | 4.1 | 4.7 | 3.2 | 1.5 | 0.9 | 0.2 | 0.8 | 0.6 | 0.7 | 0.8 | 1.7 | 3.5 | 22.7 |
| Average snowy days (≥ 0.1 in) | 0.1 | 0.0 | 0.0 | 0.0 | 0.0 | 0.0 | 0.0 | 0.0 | 0.0 | 0.0 | 0.1 | 0.1 | 0.3 |
Source: NOAA

== Arts ==
Pearblossom (in name only at present) is found in the following creative works:

- The Crows of Pearblossom, authored by Aldous Huxley
- Aldous Huxley's home in the early 1940s was nearby in Llano and is now the filming location of Pearblossom Picture Ranch
- Pearblossom Highway, a photographic collage assembled by David Hockney
- The community is mentioned in I Love Dick, the 1997 novel by Chris Kraus
- The community is briefly mentioned in The Gambler.
- While not specifically named in the 1939 John Fante novel Ask the Dust, it is mentioned in the film adaptation starring Colin Farrell and Salma Hayek. Arturo Bandini (Farrell) receives a postcard telling him that Camilla Lopez (Hayek) is dying of tuberculosis and that he should come to see her at the shack in Pearblossom where she is trying to recuperate.

David Hockney's photocollage Pearblossom Highway (1986) was actually photographed in the Littlerock rural vicinity; it, like Huxley's The Crows of Pearblossom, is not about Pearblossom proper.

In 1997, Western actor Louis R. Faust died in his Pearblossom lodgings on highway 138. His son, Louis R. Faust Jr., expired there in 2010.

The first segment of the 1993 John Carpenter anthology film Body Bags, "The Gas Station," takes place entirely in Pearblossom. The segment stars Alex Datcher and Robert Carradine, with cameos by Wes Craven, Sam Raimi, David Naughton and Buck Flower.

== Notable people ==
- Sam Crawford, Hall of Fame outfielder with the Cincinnati Reds and Detroit Tigers
- George Lazenby, actor who, among other roles, portrayed James Bond in On Her Majesty's Secret Service
- George Voskovec, actor, most notably in 12 Angry Men
