= Mojave Unified School District =

School district in California, United States

Address
- 3500 Douglas Avenue Mojave, Kern County, California, 93501; United States

District information
- Grades: K-12
- Established: 1951
- Superintendent: Dr. Katherine Aguirre
- Schools: California City High; Mojave Jr/Sr High; California City Middle; Hacienda Elementary; Mojave Elementary; Robert P. Ulrich Elementary
- NCES District ID: 0625230

Students and staff
- District mascot: Mustangs, Ravens, Coyotes, Jets, Colts, Cougars

Other information
- Website: www.mojave.k12.ca.us

Mojave Unified School District is a school district in Eastern Kern County that serves the town of Mojave and The City of California City, California (USA).

== List of schools ==
=== High schools ===
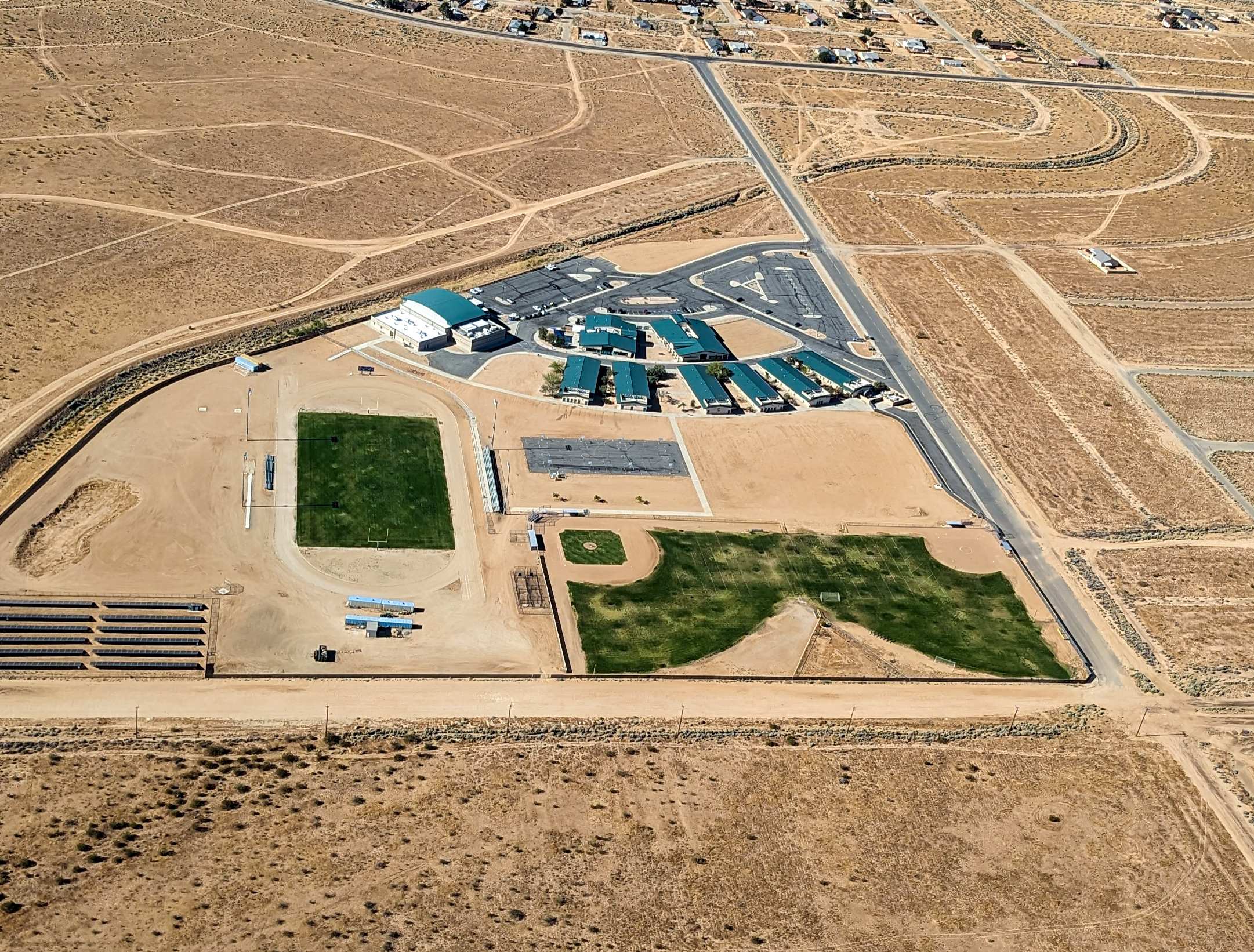
Overhead view of California City High School

- California City High School
- Mojave Junior/Senior High School

=== Middle schools ===
- California City Middle School

=== Elementary schools ===
- Hacienda Elementary School
- Mojave Elementary School
- Robert P. Ulrich Elementary School

== Transportation Department ==
MUSD's transportation department operates the oldest school bus owned by a school district in California, a 1951 Crown Supercoach. Apart from the 1951 Crown, Mojave operates an array of other Crown Supercoaches, Blue Bird All Americans, Thomas Built Rear Engines, and IC REs.

== See also ==
- List of school districts in California
- Southern Kern Unified School District
- Muroc Joint Unified School District
