= Integrated Regional Water Management Planning =

The California State Integrated Regional Water Management (IRWM) Planning is the process that promotes bringing together and prioritizing water-related efforts in the region in a systematic way to ensure sustainable water uses, reliable water supplies, better water quality, environmental stewardship, efficient urban development, protection of agriculture, and a strong economy. IRWM incorporates the physical, environmental, societal, economic, legal, and jurisdictional aspects of water management into regional solutions through open and collaborative stakeholder processes to promote sustainable water use.

Administered by the California Department of Water Resources and California State Water Resources Control Board through bond-funded Grant Programs, IRWM encourages the development of integrated regional strategies for management of water resources by providing funding, through competitive grants.

== History ==
Integrated regional water management (IRWM) was officially established by the State of California in 2002 through the passage of the Integrated Regional Water Management Planning Act (SB 1672).

== Funding ==
Funding was authorized with various propositions.

- PROPOSITION 50, the Water Security, Clean Drinking Water, Coastal and Beach Protection Act of 2002, passed by California voters in November 2002. Implementation of the Proposition 50 Chapter 8, bond funding is jointly administered by the Department of Water Resources (DWR) and the State Water Resources Control Board (State Water Board).
- PROPOSITION 84, the Safe Drinking Water, Water Quality and Supply, Flood Control, River and Coastal Protection Act, passed by California voters in November 2006. Administered by DWR, the Proposition 84 includes funding for the IRWM Grant Program.

These programs and funding have initiated Integrated Plans in most regions of the state. These efforts are bringing together agencies related to water in order to provide the highest-priority projects for funding and rapid completion.
