= North Edwards, California =

Census-designated place in California, United States

North Edwards
- Census-designated place
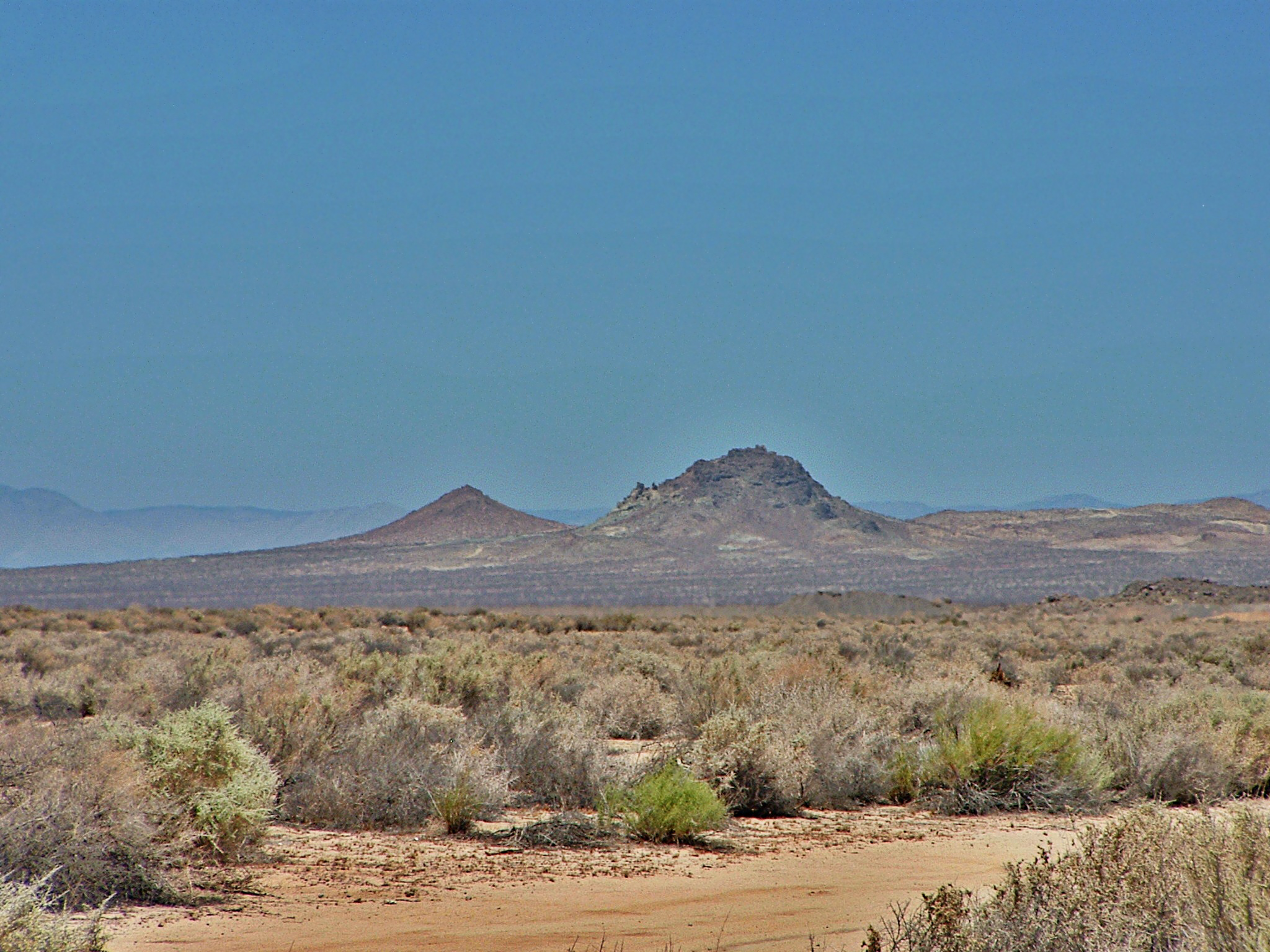
- The corner of Lamel St. and Glendower Ave. in North Edwards

- Location in Kern County and the state of California

- Location in the United States
- Coordinates: 35°01′00″N 117°49′58″W
- Country: United States
- State: California
- County: Kern
- Established: August 7th 2017

Government
  - Mayor: None
  - State senator: Shannon Grove (R)
  - Assemblymember: Tom Lackey (R)
  - U. S. rep.: Jay Obernolte (R)

Area
  - Total: 12.746 sq mi (33.012 km^{2})
  - Land: 12.746 sq mi (33.012 km^{2})
  - Water: 0 sq mi (0 km^{2}) 0%
- Elevation: 2,293 ft (699 m)

Population (2020)
  - Total: 1,054
  - Density: 82.69/sq mi (31.93/km^{2})
- Time zone: UTC-8 (Pacific (PST))
  - Summer (DST): UTC-7 (PDT)
- ZIP code: 93523
- Area codes: 442/760
- FIPS code: 06-51812
- GNIS feature ID: 1661115

North Edwards (formerly Edgemont Acres and North Muroc) is a census-designated place (CDP) in Kern County, California, United States. Situated in the Mojave Desert, North Edwards is located approximately 7.2 miles (11.6 km) north-east of Edwards Air Force Base, at an elevation of 2,293 feet (699 m). As of the 2020 census it had a population of 1,054.

== History ==
A developer announced in June 1955 that he was building houses on Clay Mine Road, within 2 miles (3 km) of the north gate of the military installation. Soon construction was underway by other builders. In March 1960, the Boron Enterprise reported that in the "bustling community" north of the base, more than 1,000 residents were living in a half dozen subdivisions. In the following year, the community was named North Edwards.

A chamber of commerce was organized in October 1958. It aimed to advance the civic, commercial, and industrial interests of the community, as well as foster beneficial social developments. Moreover, the organization hoped to exert "controlled guidance" in the community rather than allow "uncontrolled mushroom growth". By August 1957, volunteer firemen were constructing a fire station and receiving instruction in fire fighting from Kern County firemen stationed at Boron. The county assigned the volunteers a fire engine. Construction of the first phase of a shopping center began in March 1959 and it was ready for business by October. After the consolidation of several local water companies, two remained to serve the community, the Edgemont Acres Mutual Water Company organized in October 1960 and the North Edwards Water District formed in January 1987.

In May 1967 the Chamber of Commerce sponsored a community event called Western Silver Days. In a parade were a variety of floats, decorated cars, and marching units. Food was available at the firehouse and the local merchants and those of Boron donated goods and services as door prizes. Under the pastorate of the Reverend Thomas Morgan, the First Southern Baptist Church was built in June 1959. Subsequently, several other churches became a part of the community. In November 1964, the Muroc Joint Unified School District authorized a school. Upon its opening in November 1966, it accommodated kindergarten through third grade. Before opening a post office in the area of North Edwards-North Muroc, the postal authorities required the selection of a name that a majority of residents favored. Reaching an agreement proved to be difficult, and the problem was solved by establishing "Contract Branch No. 1 of the Edwards Post Office" in September 1959. In June 1961 the Chamber of Commerce and the Community League sponsored a postcard election with the understanding that all who cast votes would be willing to accept the outcome. The winning name was North Edwards and the post office opened in September 1961 with Nevajoe Roush as the postmaster.

The Kern County Planning Commission recognized North Edwards as a town in January 1963.

North Edwards was also the first town to have a woman as president of the Chamber of Commerce, Ann L. Campen. She served until her death on August 15, 1973. She was responsible for having Clay Mine Road paved, also for having telephone service to Aerial Acres, she was a representative for Barry Goldwater Jr., and she helped organize an annual community parade for North Edwards and Boron Ca. bringing some famous people as Grand Marshall's to participate in the parades. Being an American Indian and born on a reservation, there is no real record of her birth, she always told her grandchildren at every birthday, she was 58.

For mostly reasons of economic viability, several prior establishments have been closed over the years, including 20 Mule Team Cafe, a bar & restaurant (The Bubbi North formerly The Red Barn), pizza parlor (Chuck's Pizza), hardware store (Hillman's True Value), movie rental, bowling alley (due to arson), and the local elementary school (Richard B. Lynch). Today, the town serves mainly as a bedroom community for those wishing to live near either Edwards Air Force Base or the U.S. Borax mine in Boron.

== Geography ==
North Edwards is located at 35°01′00″N 117°49′58″W.

According to the United States Census Bureau, the CDP has a total area of 12.746 square miles (33.012 km^{2}), all land.

=== Climate ===
According to the Köppen Climate Classification system, North Edwards has a semi-arid climate, abbreviated "BSk" on climate maps.

== Demographics ==
Historical population
Census	Pop.	Note	%±
1980	1,107		—
1990	1,259		13.7%
2000	1,227		−2.5%
2010	1,058		−13.8%
2020	1,054		−0.4%
U.S. Decennial Census; 1860–1870 1880-1890; 1900 1910 1920; 1930 1940 1950; 1960 1970 1980; 1990 2000 2010; 2020

North Edwards first appeared as a census designated place in the 1980 United States census.

=== Racial and ethnic composition ===
North Edwards CDP, California – Racial and ethnic composition Note: the US Census treats Hispanic/Latino as an ethnic category. This table excludes Latinos from the racial categories and assigns them to a separate category. Hispanics/Latinos may be of any race.
Race / Ethnicity (NH = Non-Hispanic)	Pop 2000	Pop 2010	Pop 2020	% 2000	% 2010	% 2020
White alone (NH)	1,015	775	646	82.72%	73.25%	61.29%
Black or African American alone (NH)	23	36	68	1.87%	3.40%	6.45%
Native American or Alaska Native alone (NH)	30	6	12	2.44%	0.57%	1.14%
Asian alone (NH)	26	20	27	2.12%	1.89%	2.56%
Native Hawaiian or Pacific Islander alone (NH)	8	1	6	0.65%	0.09%	0.57%
Other race alone (NH)	3	2	4	0.24%	0.19%	0.38%
Mixed race or Multiracial (NH)	31	39	64	2.53%	3.69%	6.07%
Hispanic or Latino (any race)	91	179	227	7.42%	16.92%	21.54%
Total	1,227	1,058	1,054	100.00%	100.00%	100.00%

=== 2020 census ===
As of the 2020 census, North Edwards had a population of 1,054. The population density was 82.7 inhabitants per square mile (31.9/km^{2}). The whole population lived in households.

The age distribution was 218 people (20.7%) under the age of 18, 79 people (7.5%) aged 18 to 24, 247 people (23.4%) aged 25 to 44, 287 people (27.2%) aged 45 to 64, and 223 people (21.2%) who were 65 years of age or older. The median age was 44.4 years. For every 100 females, there were 109.1 males, and for every 100 females age 18 and over there were 107.4 males.

0.0% of residents lived in urban areas, while 100.0% lived in rural areas.

There were 450 households, out of which 109 (24.2%) had children under the age of 18 living in them, 176 (39.1%) were married-couple households, 30 (6.7%) were cohabiting couple households, 100 (22.2%) had a female householder with no partner present, and 144 (32.0%) had a male householder with no partner present. 168 households (37.3%) were one person, and 65 (14.4%) were one person aged 65 or older. The average household size was 2.34. There were 250 families (55.6% of all households).

There were 563 housing units at an average density of 44.2 units per square mile (17.1 units/km^{2}), of which 450 (79.9%) were occupied and 113 (20.1%) were vacant. Of the occupied units, 268 (59.6%) were owner-occupied and 182 (40.4%) were occupied by renters. The homeowner vacancy rate was 1.5%, and the rental vacancy rate was 6.3%.

=== Income and poverty ===
In 2023, the US Census Bureau estimated that the median household income was $35,469, and the per capita income was $22,370. About 17.4% of families and 18.8% of the population were below the poverty line.

=== 2010 ===
At the 2010 census North Edwards had a population of 1,058. The population density was 83.0 inhabitants per square mile (32.0/km^{2}). The racial makeup of North Edwards was 847 (80.1%) White, 43 (4.1%) African American, 26 (2.5%) Native American, 20 (1.9%) Asian, 1 (0.1%) Pacific Islander, 60 (5.7%) from other races, and 61 (5.8%) from two or more races. Hispanic or Latino of any race were 179 people (16.9%).

The whole population lived in households, no one lived in non-institutionalized group quarters and no one was institutionalized.

There were 417 households, 132 (31.7%) had children under the age of 18 living in them, 212 (50.8%) were opposite-sex married couples living together, 40 (9.6%) had a female householder with no husband present, 20 (4.8%) had a male householder with no wife present. There were 22 (5.3%) unmarried opposite-sex partnerships, and 2 (0.5%) same-sex married couples or partnerships. 121 households (29.0%) were one person and 43 (10.3%) had someone living alone who was 65 or older. The average household size was 2.54. There were 272 families (65.2% of households); the average family size was 3.16.

The age distribution was 283 people (26.7%) under the age of 18, 67 people (6.3%) aged 18 to 24, 226 people (21.4%) aged 25 to 44, 323 people (30.5%) aged 45 to 64, and 159 people (15.0%) who were 65 or older. The median age was 41.0 years. For every 100 females, there were 102.3 males. For every 100 females age 18 and over, there were 97.7 males.

There were 557 housing units at an average density of 43.7 per square mile, of the occupied units 280 (67.1%) were owner-occupied and 137 (32.9%) were rented. The homeowner vacancy rate was 8.1%; the rental vacancy rate was 20.3%. 701 people (66.3% of the population) lived in owner-occupied housing units and 357 people (33.7%) lived in rental housing units.
