= Delta Scientific Corporation =

American manufacturer of vehicle access control equipment

Delta Scientific Corp.
- Company type: Private
- Industry: Defense & Security
- Founded: 1974 in Santa Clarita, California
- Founder: Harry D. Dickinson
- Headquarters: Palmdale, California, United States
- Products: Guard booths parking control equipment vehicle access equipment barricade systems
- Number of employees: 175+ (2007)
- Website: www.deltascientific.com

Delta Scientific Corporation, also known just as Delta Scientific, is a company based in Palmdale, California, United States. As a worldwide corporation, Delta Scientific Corp. has been developing and making vehicle access control equipment since 1974. In addition to the Palmdale headquarters, they have offices in Lorton, Virginia and Great Britain.

Delta Scientific is a manufacturer of vehicle access control equipment including guard booths, parking control equipment, and high-security vehicle barricade systems. Delta has supplied counter-terrorist barricade systems to over 160 U.S. embassies and consulates in 130-plus countries as well as those of the United Kingdom and other nations. In the United States, Delta has products at over 110 Federal buildings, including courthouses and Federal Bureau of Investigation locations. Many U.S. nuclear power plants are also protected by Delta's vehicle barricade systems.

Delta Scientific products are also located at the U.S. Capitol and other Washington, D.C. landmark buildings, various high-rises throughout the world, along the streets of New York City, some corporate facilities, the Parliament of Singapore, power and water infrastructure locales, some European castles and some private homes of celebrities and other people in Beverly Hills, California and other upscale communities.
