= The Palmdale Aerospace Academy =

Location
- 3300 E Palmdale Blvd, CA 93550; Palmdale, California; United States; 34.5793°N 118.0696°W

Information
- Type: Charter
- Motto: Design, Create and Explore
- Established: 2012
- Principal: Timothy Lankford
- Grades: k-12 (2020-2022)
- Enrollment: 1620 (apprx.)
- Colors: Orange and Grey
- Mascot: Griffin
- Newspaper: Griffin Gazette
- Website: www.tpaa.org

The Palmdale Aerospace Academy (TPAA) is located in Palmdale, California. The charter school opened to 540 students from grades seventh through ninth on September 5, 2012 and is now open for grades K-12.

== Partnerships ==
TPAA has partnered with aerospace industry employers, the City of Palmdale, the Palmdale School District and others for science, technology, engineering, and mathematics (STEM) education that involves collaborative learning for college preparation.

== Clubs list (partial) ==
- Science Olympiad
- Soccer
- Key Club
- Game Engineers
- AERO Club (formerly known as Civil Air Patrol ACE Club)
- Astronomy Club
- Gardening Club
- Gryffingear 5012
- Venture Crew 180
- Gardening Club
- Christian Club
- Co-Ed Volleyball Club
- Drama Club
- Comic Book Club
- Sewing Club
