= On Her Majesty's Secret Service =

On Her Majesty's Secret Service may refer to:

- On Her Majesty's Secret Service (novel), a 1963 James Bond novel by Ian Fleming
- On Her Majesty's Secret Service (film), a 1969 film adaptation of the novel by Peter R. Hunt
  - On Her Majesty's Secret Service (soundtrack), the soundtrack from the film by John Barry, including the title theme
- On Her Majesty's Secret Service (Propellerheads song), from the 1998 Propellerheads album Decksandrumsandrockandroll

== See also ==
- Secret Service (disambiguation)
- Her Majesty's Secret Service (now His Majesty’s Secret Service) or MI6, the British intelligence agency
- On His Majesty's Service, formerly On Her Majesty's Service, franking (postage) on official documents in the United Kingdom and Commonwealth countries
- On His Majesty's Secret Service, a 2009 Hong Kong film
- On Her Majesty's Occult Service, a 2007 novel by Charles Stross
- "On Her Majesty's Sewer Service", a television episode featuring Mario
