= Antelope Valley Indian Museum State Historic Park =

Historic park in California, United States

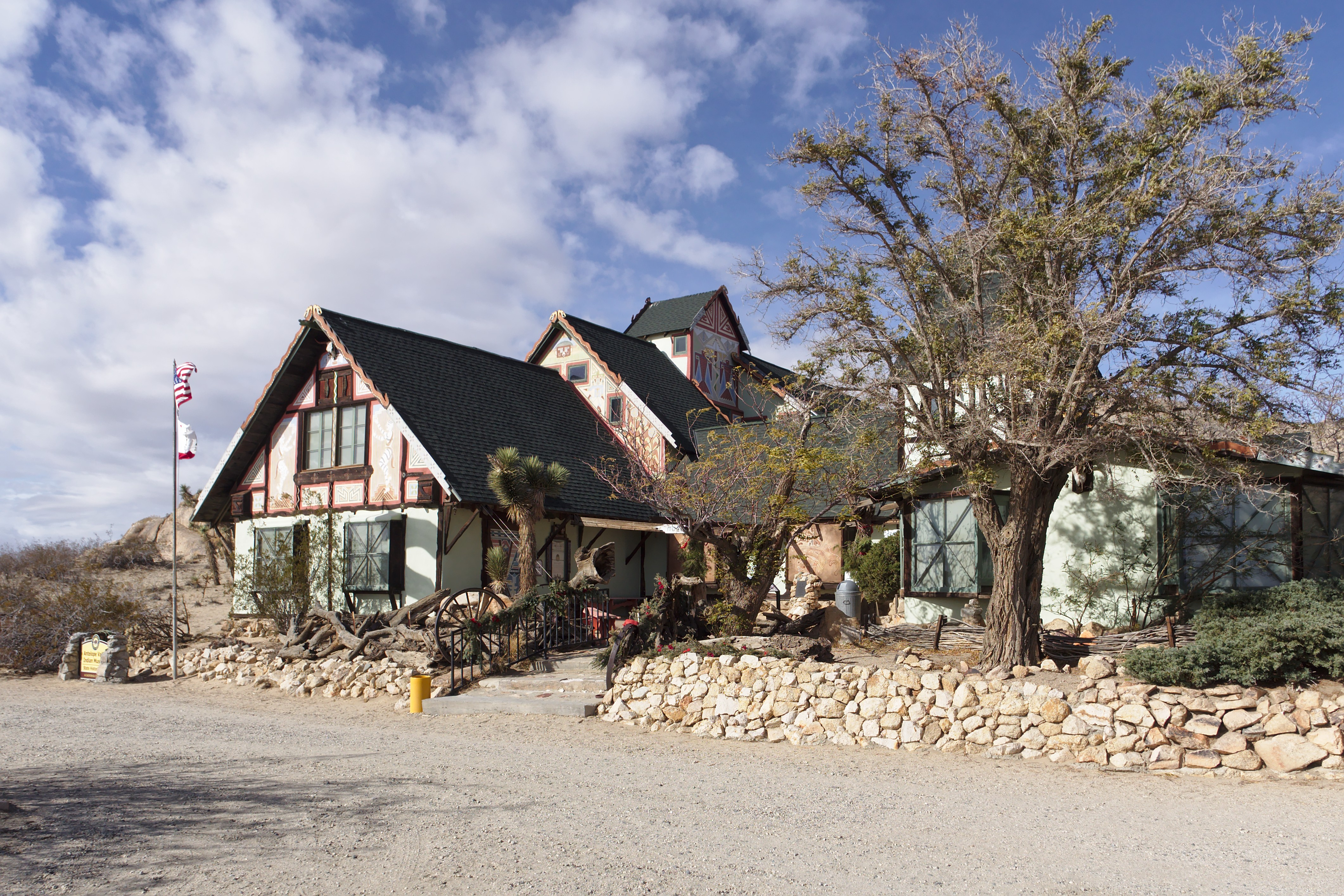
- Museum from southeast

- Location within California Location within the United States
- Location: Los Angeles County, California, United States
- Nearest city: Lancaster, California
- Coordinates: 34°39′1″N 117°50′56″W
- Area: 397 acres (161 ha)
- Established: 1979
- Governing body: California Department of Parks and Recreation
- Antelope Valley Indian Museum
- U.S. National Register of Historic Places
- Location: 15701 East Avenue M Lancaster, California
- Built: 1928
- Architect: H. Arden Edwards; Grace Oliver
- NRHP reference No.: 87000509
- Added to NRHP: February 26, 1987

The Antelope Valley Indian Museum State Historic Park is a state historic park of California, United States, interpreting Native American cultures of the Great Basin and surrounding regions. The park and its grounds are situated on the Antelope Valley's rural east side in northern Los Angeles County, California.

The museum contains the combined collections of H. Arden Edwards and subsequent owner and anthropology student Grace Oliver. The exhibits represent and interpret Native Americans groups, both aboriginal and contemporary, of the Southwest, Great Basin, and Californian cultural regions. A number of the artifacts on display are rare or one-of-a-kind items.

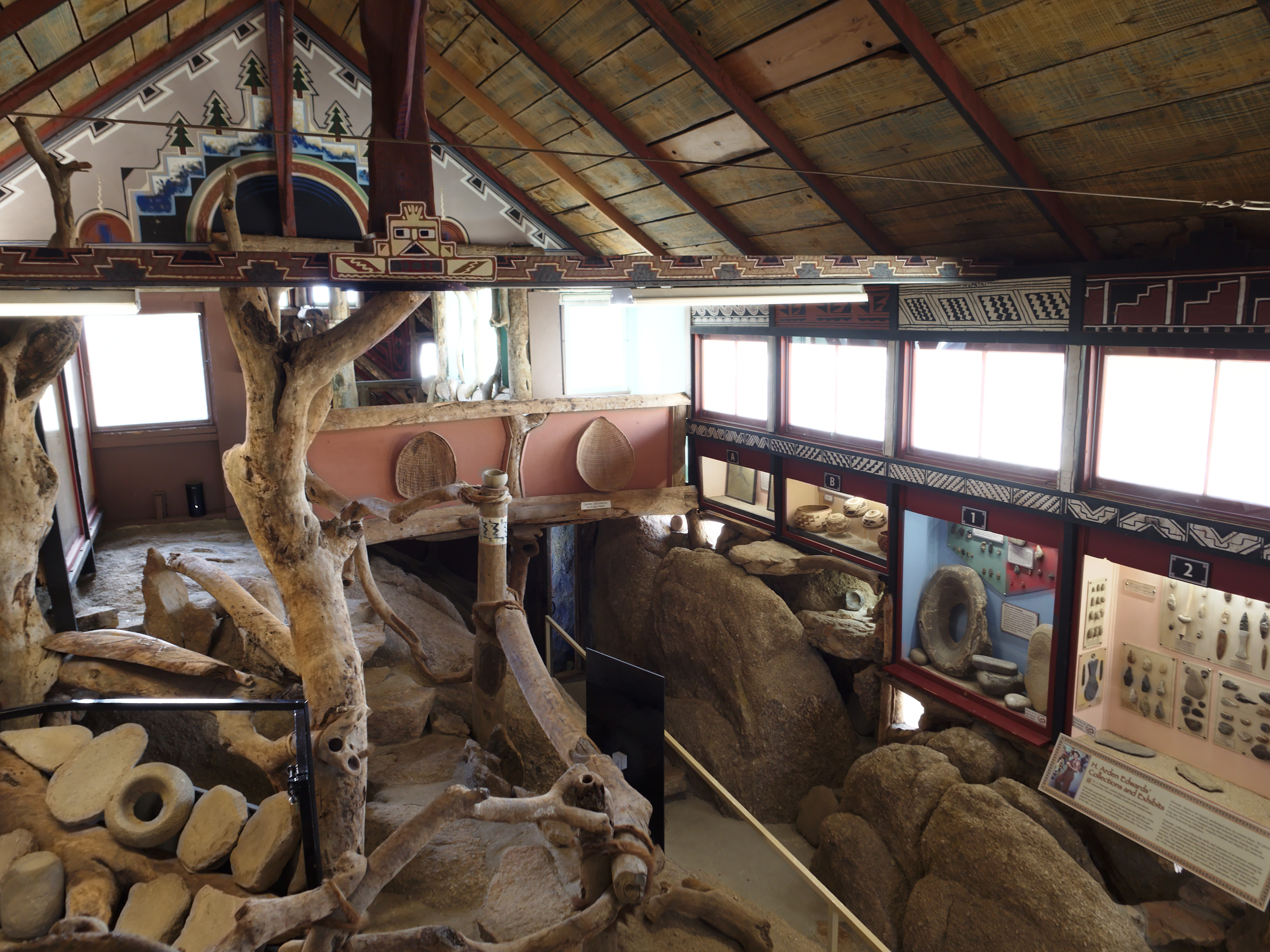
California Hall

The museum was originally constructed by homesteader/artist H. Arden Edwards in 1928. The chalet-style structure was built over the rock formation of Piute Butte in the Mojave Desert. The unusual folk art structure, originally used as a home, is listed on the National Register of Historic Places.

== Demonstrations and special events ==
Joshua Cottage features a "touch table" room where visitors can experience food grinding and processing techniques, or learn how earlier Native Americans started fires using sticks or bow drills.

Outside the museum is a self-guided nature trail, a picnic area, and an outdoor ceremonial arena. Occasionally guest Native American groups perform traditional dances and other programs. An annual opening event each fall features a traditional ground blessing ceremony. There are also Native American artists demonstrating and selling their work, Native American food, and special activities for children. The museum also sponsors periodic educational seminars.
