= Del Sur, California =

Unincorporated community in California, United States

- Unincorporated community
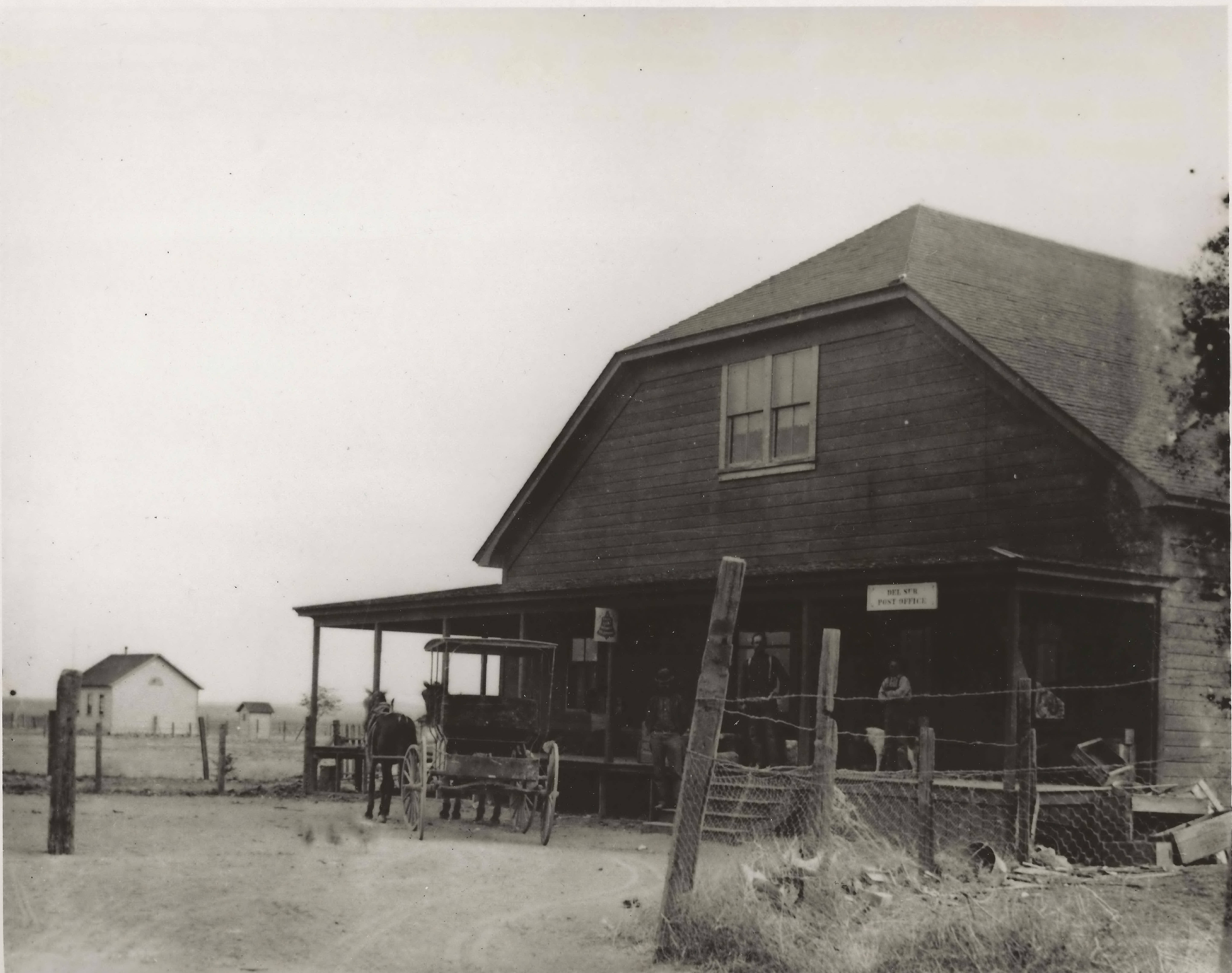
- Del Sur store and post office, 1900s

- Location within Los Angeles County

- Location in the United States
- Coordinates: 34°41′23″N 118°17′19″W
- Country: United States
- State: California
- County: Los Angeles
- Time zone: UTC-8 (Pacific (PST))
  - Summer (DST): UTC-7 (PDT)
- ZIP codes: 93536
- Area code: 661
- GNIS feature ID: 270824

Del Sur (Spanish for "Of The South") is an unincorporated community in the Mojave Desert, in Los Angeles County, California, United States. The town has a population of about 1,750. The ZIP code is 93536 and the community is served by area code 661.

== Etymology ==
Del Sur is derived from a Spanish phrase meaning "of the south".

== Geography ==
Del Sur is located about 9 miles (14 km) west of Quartz Hill and 15 miles (24 km) northwest of Palmdale in the Antelope Valley portion of Southern California. It is surrounded by the city of Lancaster.
