= Edwards, California =

Unincorporated community in California, United States

Edwards
- Unincorporated community
- Location in California Edwards (the United States)
- Coordinates: 34°55′34″N 117°56′06″W
- Country: United States
- State: California
- County: Kern
- Elevation: 2,356 ft (718 m)
- ZIP code: 93523

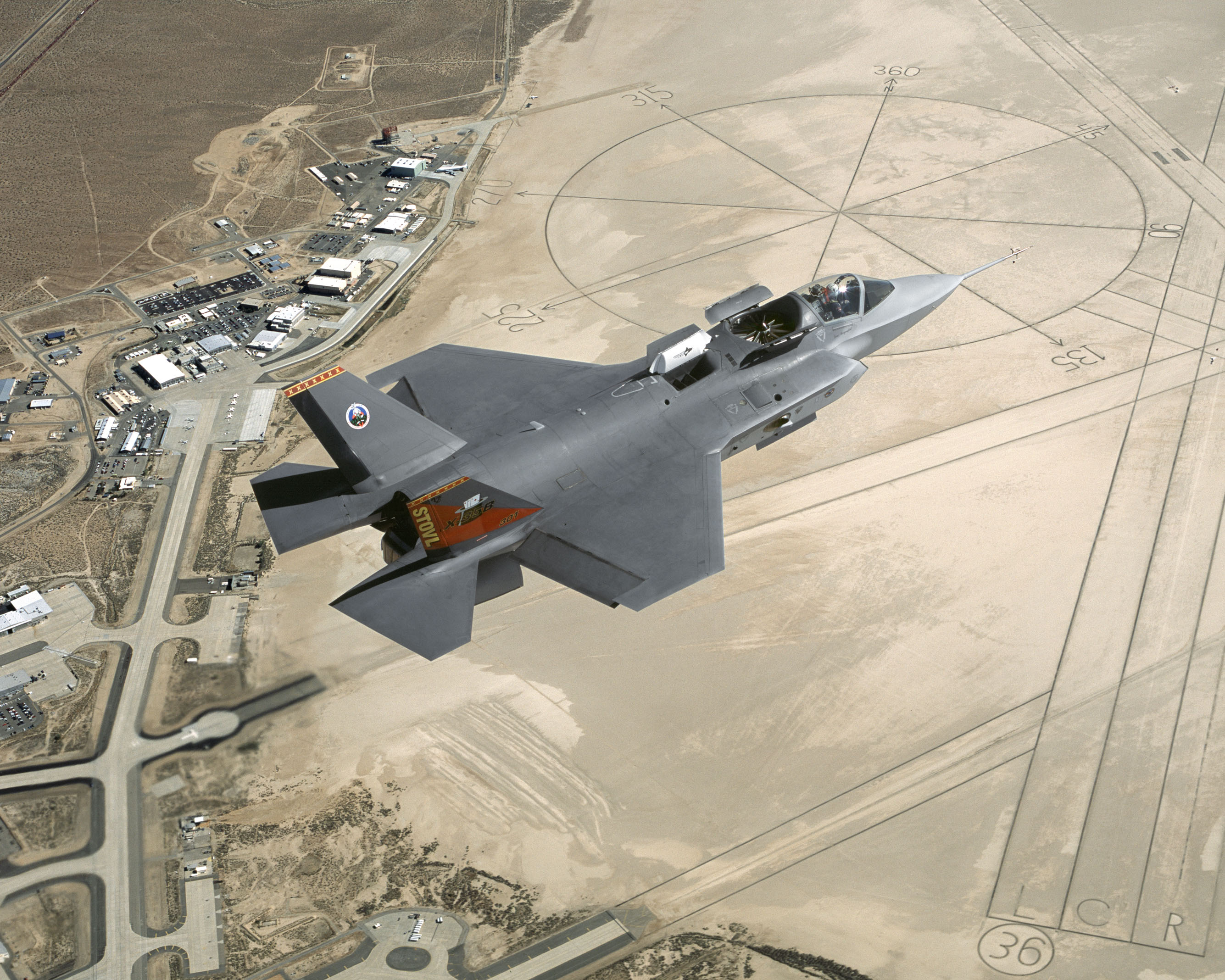
Lockheed Martin X-35B at the Edwards Air Force Base

Edwards (formerly Muroc and Wherry Housing) is an unincorporated community in Kern County, California, United States.

It is located 16 miles (26 km) east-southeast of Mojave, about 22 miles (35 km) northeast of Lancaster, 15 miles (24 km) east of Rosamond, and 5.5 miles (8.9 km) south of California City at an elevation of 2,356 feet (718 m).

The area was originally a housing site for the air force base that surrounds it. The place name changed to Edwards in 1951 (after the base was renamed and a post office transferred from Muroc was established). It is part of the Edwards Air Force Base reservation.

== Climate ==
According to the Köppen Climate Classification system, Edwards has a semi-arid climate, abbreviated "BSk" on climate maps.
