= Muroc Joint Unified School District =

School district in California, United States

Address
- 17100 Foothill Ave North Edwards, Kern, CA, 93523; United States

District information
- Type: Public Education
- Motto: "Education is our business"
- Grades: TK-Adult
- Established: 1953
- Superintendent: Kevin Cordes
- Asst. superintendent(s): Brent Tan, Student Services
- Business administrator: Trevor Walker, CBO
- Governing agency: California Department of Education
- Schools: Elementary 2, Junior/Senior High Schools 2, Adult Education 1

Students and staff
- Students: 1,900

Other information
- Website: www.muroc.k12.ca.us

Muroc Joint Unified School District is a public K-12 unified school system of approximately 2,000 students, located in the Mojave Desert approximately 110 miles (180 km) northeast of Los Angeles.

It was founded as an elementary school in 1911 at Edwards. Boron students were bussed to the air base for their education. As the area became more populated, another school was established in 1929, in Boron. The schools became a unified district in 1953, encompassing 578 square miles (1,500 km^{2}) in Kern and San Bernardino counties.

The District serves the communities of Boron (including Kramer Junction and Desert Lake), North Edwards and Edwards Air Force Base, and maintains five school sites: Boron Junior/Senior High School (7-12); Desert Junior/Senior High School (7-12); West Boron Elementary School (TK-6); Branch Elementary School (TK-6); and Lynch Learning Center (Adult Education). Both of the comprehensive high schools offer an alternative education program and have received "WASC Accreditation" . All of these schools have been awarded "California Distinguished School" status.

== Schools ==
=== Elementary ===
- Irving L Branch Elementary School
- West Boron Elementary School

=== Junior/Senior High School ===
- Boron Junior/Senior High School
- Desert Junior/Senior High School

=== Adult Education ===
- Lynch Learning Center

=== See also ===
- List of school districts in California
- Southern Kern Unified School District
- List of school districts in Kern County, California
- Great Schools.org
