= Llano, California =

Unincorporated community in California, United States

- Unincorporated community
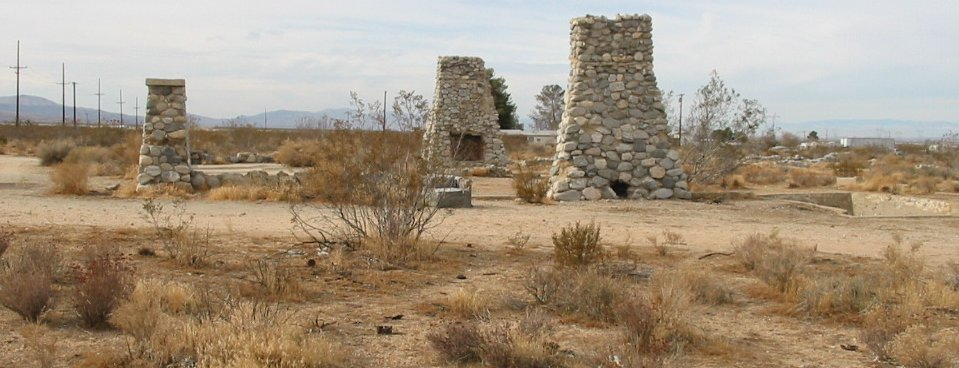
- Llano del Rio

- Location within Los Angeles County

- Location within Greater Los Angeles Location in California Location in the United States
- Coordinates: 34°29′36″N 117°47′16″W
- Country: United States
- State: California
- County: Los Angeles

Population (2000)
  - Total: 1,201
- Time zone: UTC-8 (Pacific (PST))
  - Summer (DST): UTC-7 (PDT)
- ZIP codes: 93544
- Area code: 661

Llano (Spanish for "plain") is an unincorporated community located in Los Angeles County, California, United States, near the San Bernardino County line.

== History ==
Llano is a name derived from Spanish meaning "plain".

The ruins of Llano del Rio are still extant along Highway 138 east of 165th Street East. The socialist community moved and Llano del Rio was abandoned in 1918, leaving behind the "ghost" of an alternative future for Los Angeles.

== Geography ==
Llano is located approximately 25 miles (40 km) southeast of Palmdale in the Antelope Valley portion of Southern California. The town of Pearblossom lies to the west, while the town of Piñon Hills lies to the east. It is a few miles from the San Gabriel Mountains

Pearblossom Highway (as State Route 18), and Pearblossom Highway (as State Route 138) pass through the heart of Llano and comprise its two principal streets.

== Notable people ==
- Aldous Huxley's former home, now Pearblossom Picture Ranch, a filming location
- Carl Grillmair, astrophysicist and astronomer at Caltech
