= Antelope Valley California Poppy Reserve =

Nature reserve in Los Angeles County, California, United States

- IUCN category V (protected landscape/seascape)
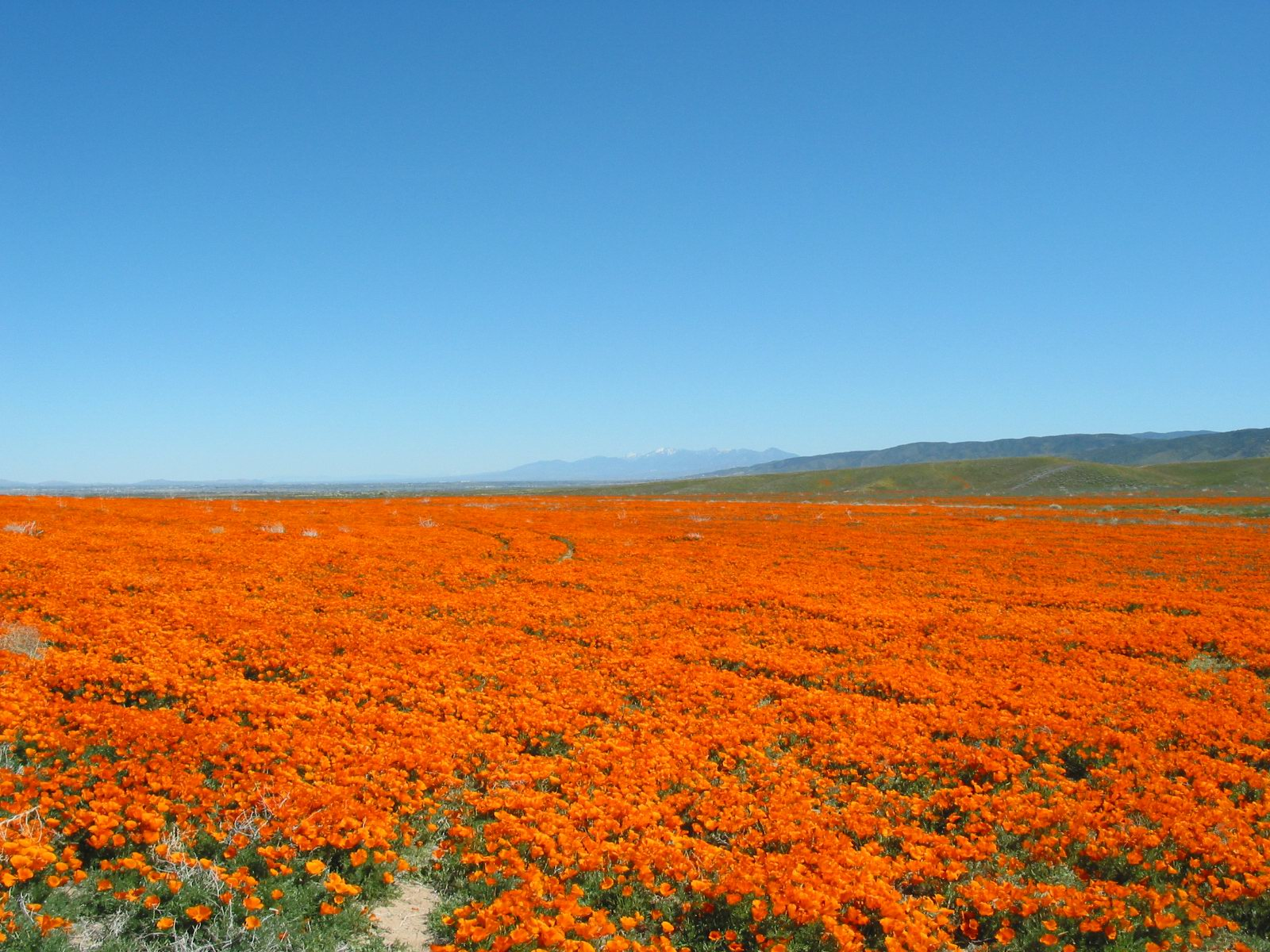
- A field of California poppies

- Location within the Los Angeles metropolitan area Location within California Location within the United States
- Interactive map of Antelope Valley California Poppy Reserve
- Location: Los Angeles County, California, United States
- Nearest city: Lancaster, California
- Coordinates: 34°43′39″N 118°23′41″W
- Area: 1,781 acres (7.21 km^{2})
- Established: 1976
- Governing body: California Department of Parks and Recreation

Antelope Valley California Poppy Reserve is a state-protected reserve of California, United States, harboring the most consistent blooms of California poppies, the state flower. The reserve is located in the rural west side of Antelope Valley in northern Los Angeles County, 15 miles (24 km) west of Lancaster. To the north is Kern County. The reserve is at an elevation ranging from 2,600 to 3,000 feet (790 to 910 m) above sea level, in the Mojave Desert climate zone. The reserve is administered by the California Department of Parks and Recreation. Other wildflowers within the reserve include the owl's clover, lupine, goldfields, cream cups and coreopsis.

== The Reserve ==
The intense blooming season for the California Poppy usually falls within late winter to early spring, during the months of mid-February through mid-May. Blooming seasons are dependent on the amount of rainfall during the winter to early spring seasons. Within the reserve, there are 7 miles (11 km) of trails, including a paved section for wheelchair access, which traverse the poppy fields.

In order to keep the fields in a strictly natural state, California State Parks does not water or stimulate the flowers. The park service also excludes sheep and cattle from grazing the hillsides. Until the early 1970s, sheep once grazed the buttes in the western Antelope Valley. Pronghorn grazed long before then, until the railroad arrived in 1876. With the exception of service dogs, pets are prohibited from the reserve. Under California state law, visitors are also prohibited from taking flowers from the reserve.

Since 1994, controlled fires have been used to regulate dead brush, exotic species and litter within the reserve.

The reserve is located 7 miles (11 km) east of Arthur B. Ripley Desert Woodland State Park.

The interpretive center at the park is named after Jane S. Pinheiro, a conservationist and community activist, who was instrumental in the creation of the poppy reserve.

== See also ==
- List of California Native Plants
- List of California State Parks
- Natural History of the Mojave Desert
