= Jane S. Pinheiro =

Jane Pinheiro, conservationist, artist, community activist

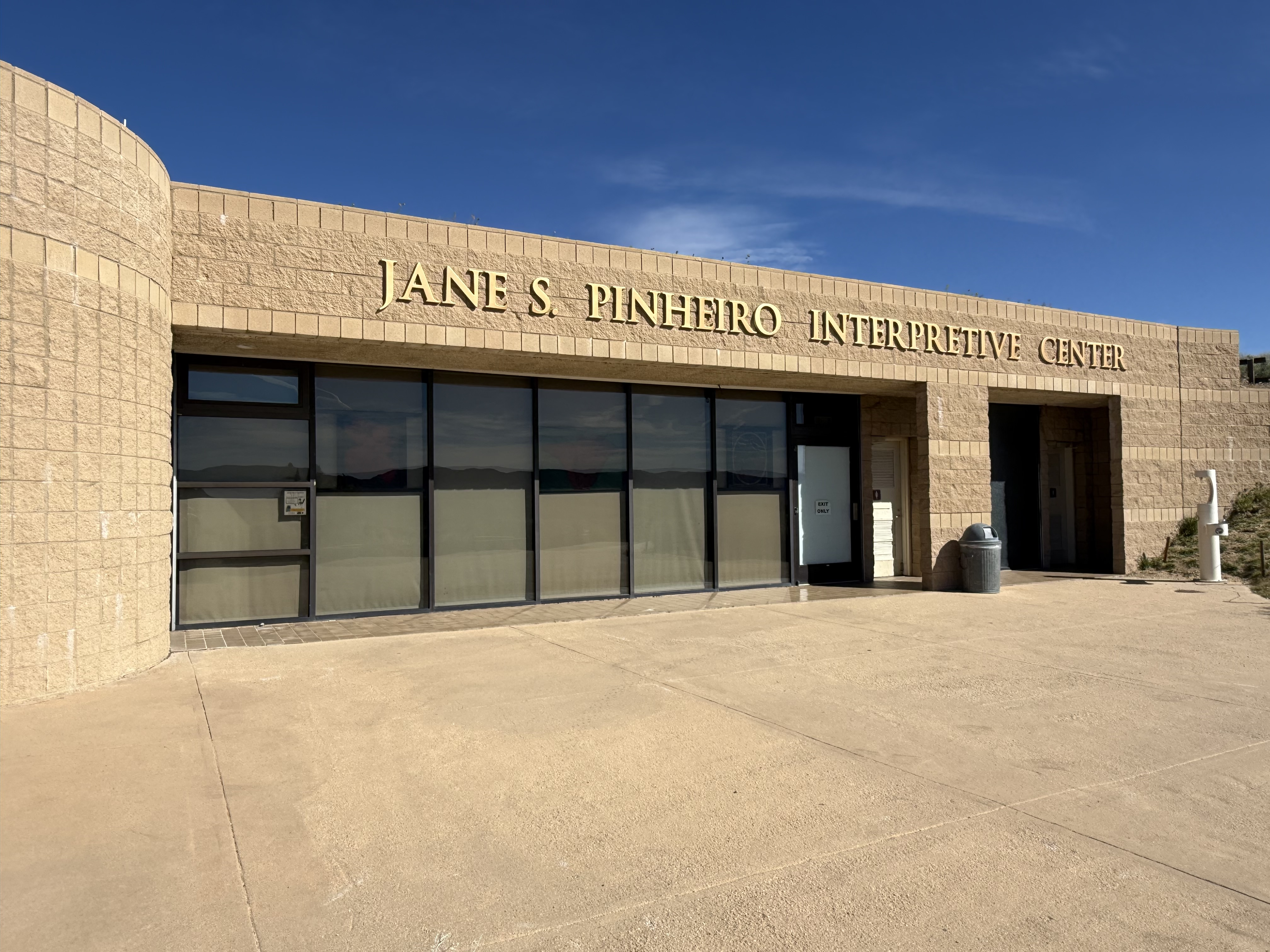
Jane S. Pinheiro Interpretive Center at the Antelope Valley California Poppy Reserve

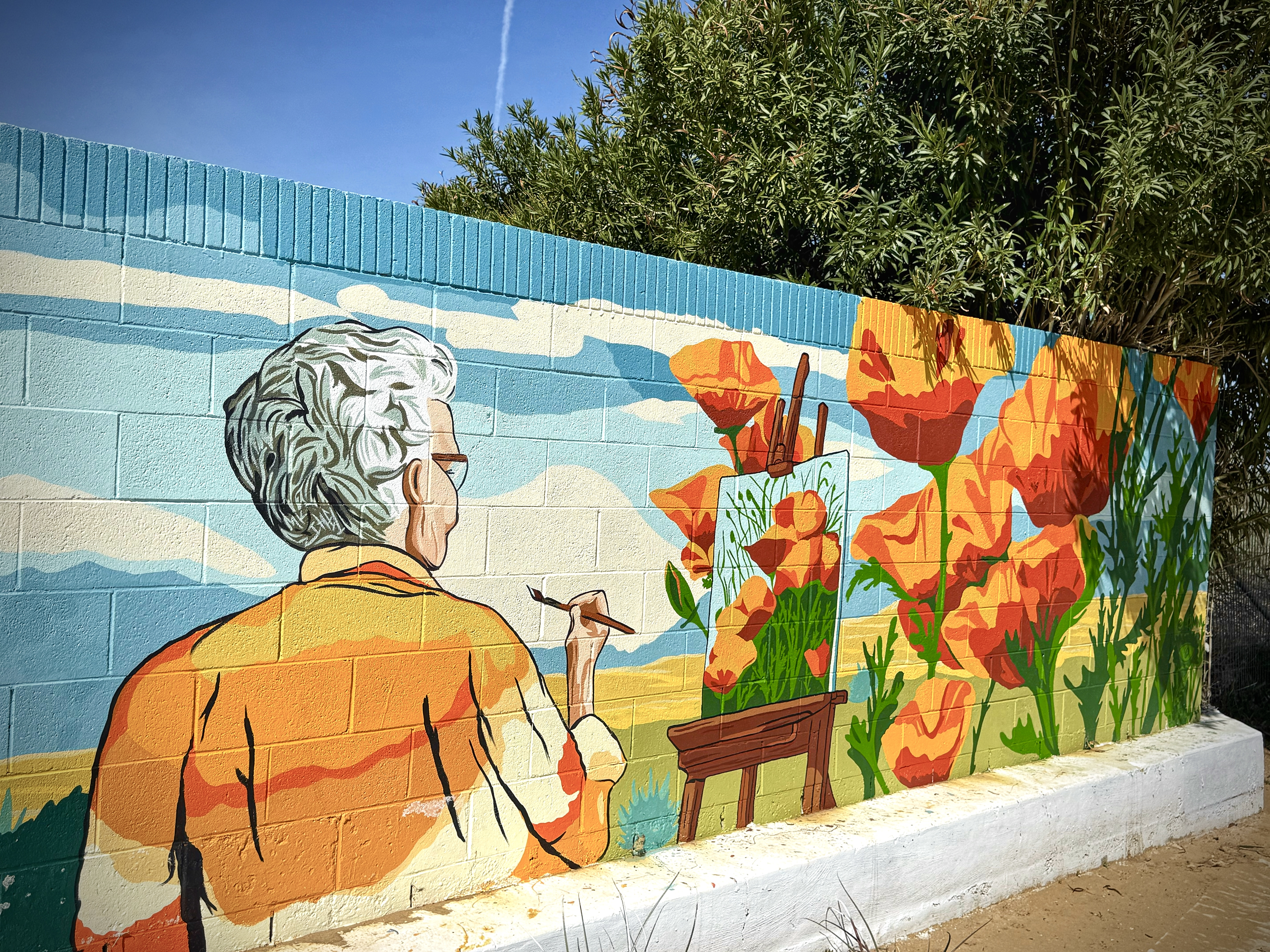
Public mural in Lancaster, California depicting Jane S. Pinheiro. Mural by @aqmni

Jane Seymour Pinheiro (1907–1978) was a conservationist, community activist, and artist who successfully advocated for the creation of the Antelope Valley California Poppy Reserve State Natural Reserve in southern California and other nature reserves in the Mojave Desert. Pinheiro was known as “The Great Poppy Lady.”

== Early life ==
Jane Seymour was born on September 9, 1907, in Denver, Colorado.

She grew up in Salt Lake City, Utah where she later earned her teaching credential from the University of Utah.

In the late 1920s she moved to Pasadena, California with her mother, Nellie Flick Seymour, who ran a boarding house.

While living in Pasadena, Jane met Joseph Pinheiro; they married on September 25, 1930. In 1940 the Pinheiros moved to the Antelope Valley in northern Los Angeles County.

== Accomplishments and Activism ==
While living in the high desert of the Antelope Valley, Jane developed an interest in local desert plants and began learning about them. Jane was a self-taught artist and began painting the local wildflowers. Her plant paintings were noted for their botanical accuracy.

Jane Pinheiro was dedicated to the preservation of the environment and worked with the Lancaster Woman's Club Wildflower Preservation Committee to establish the Antelope Valley California Poppy Reserve. Starting in 1970, Jane began working with local community groups to begin raising funds with a goal of purchasing acreage in western Lancaster to create the reserve. Money was raised to purchase the land by securing donations of $650 which was noted to "buy an acre," and donations of $5 which "bought" 300 square feet at the proposed poppy preserve. Additionally, Jane was involved with penny drives at local schools called "Pennies for Poppies," which helped raise funds for the needed land. In total, 1,745 acres (706.18 ha) were acquired, and on April 24, 1976, the land was given to the state and dedicated as the Antelope Valley California Poppy Reserve, a California State Park. The interpretive center at the poppy reserve was dedicated to Jane S. Pinheiro on April 17th, 1982. The operation of the Interpretive Center is assisted by the Poppy Reserve/Mojave Desert Interpretive Association (PRMDIA) which supports the educational programs for the general public and school children at state parks in the Antelope Valley area. Some of Jane's paintings are on display at the Jane S. Pinheiro Interpretive Center, and also at the Theodore Payne Foundation and the Native Plant Guild.

In addition to her work to establish the poppy reserve, Jane Pinheiro worked on the Antelope Valley State Parks Committee with Assemblyman Allen Miller to establish Saddleback Butte State Park in 1960 (originally called Joshua Tree State Park) to preserve Joshua trees. She also advocated for the creation of the Devil's Punchbowl Natural Area, and eight wildlife/wildflower sanctuaries, ranging in size from 100 acres (40.47 ha) to 455 acres (184.13 ha), all located in the Antelope Valley.

Jane was a lobbyist in Sacramento on conservation issues. She received the National Oak Leaf Service Award from the Nature Conservancy in 1975 and the Sol Feinstone Environmental Award in 1976. She was flown to Washington, D.C and New York City, respectively, to receive these awards.

Jane was a regular contributor to Desert Magazine in the 1950s and 1960s regarding her knowledge of native plants and wildflowers.

Jane also wrote articles about local wildflowers for the Antelope Valley Press newspaper, as well as the Daily Ledger-Gazette.

In 1950 she worked to create the Quartz Hill Almond Blossom Festival and served for 10 years on the board of the Antelope Valley Fair and Alfalfa Festival.

Jane was also a contributor to the book, A Flower-Watcher’s Guide: The Spring-Blooming Wildflowers of the Antelope Valley, By Milt Stark.

In addition to her work in the creation of nature preserves, Jane Pinheiro was a civic leader in the community and was on the board of the Antelope Valley Medical Center for 10 years. The hospital honored the contributions of Jane Pinheiro in September 2025 by showcasing her original paintings and featuring poppy-themed merchandise from the Antelope Valley California Poppy Reserve to recognize her efforts and advocacy.

There is a mural which bears Jane Pinheiro's image near the entrance to the Prime Desert Woodland Preserve located in Lancaster, California.

== Death ==
Jane Pinheiro died on October 14, 1978. Her husband Joseph died in August 1982. Having no direct descendents, they left their estate to the Theodore Payne Foundation, a non-profit organization in Sun Valley that promotes California native plants through its nursery, demonstration gardens, and educational programs.
