= Saddleback Butte State Park =

State park in California, United States

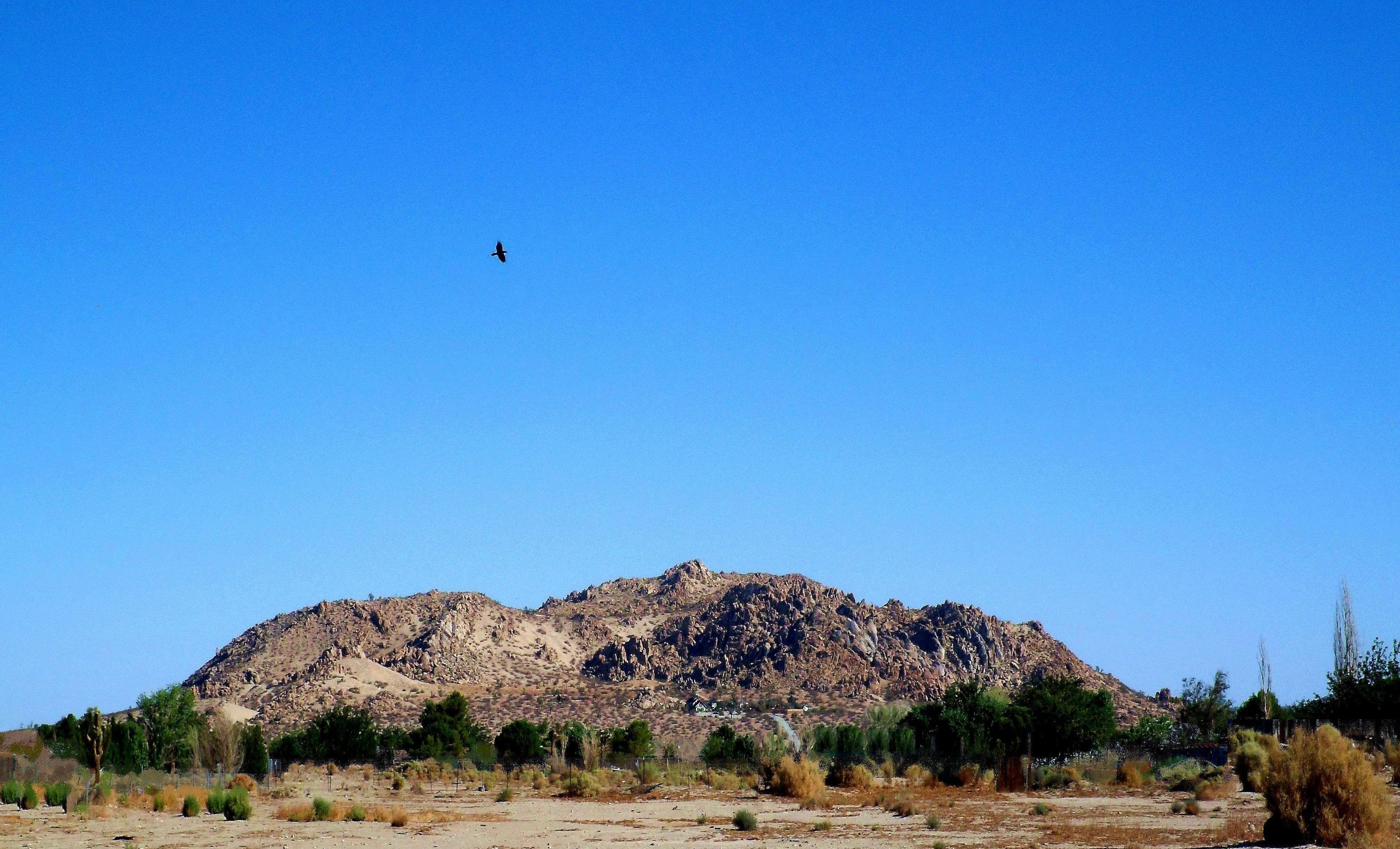
- One of the Saddleback buttes, the Piute Butte, with the Antelope Valley Indian Museum situated at center

- Location within California Location within the United States
- Location: Hi Vista, California, United States
- Nearest city: Lake Los Angeles, California
- Coordinates: 34°40′N 117°48′W
- Area: 2,955 acres (11.96 km^{2})
- Established: 1960
- Governing body: California Department of Parks and Recreation

Saddleback Butte State Park is a state park in the Antelope Valley of the western Mojave Desert, in Southern California. It is located east of Lancaster, north of the community of Lake Los Angeles, and south of Edwards in the unincorporated community of Hi Vista.

The prominent feature and namesake of the park is Saddleback Butte, a butte that is 3,651 feet (1,113 m) high.

Saddleback Butte State Park includes over 2,955 acres (4.617 sq mi) of land, and was created in 1960 to protect the area's Joshua Tree (Yucca brevifolia) desert habitat.

A local community activist and conservationist, Jane S. Pinheiro, was instrumental in the creation of Saddleback Butte State Park. She succeeded in persuading the California State Assembly to set aside the acreage for the park, which was originally called Joshua Tree State Park.. Later, to avoid confusion with Joshua Tree National Monument, the name was changed to Saddleback Butte State Park.

== See also ==
- Natural history of the Mojave Desert
- List of California state parks
- Protected areas of the Mojave Desert
