= Eremopedes balli =

Scientific classification
- Domain: Eukaryota
- Kingdom: Animalia
- Phylum: Arthropoda
- Class: Insecta
- Order: Orthoptera
- Suborder: Ensifera
- Family: Tettigoniidae
- Tribe: Platycleidini
- Genus: Eremopedes
- Species: E. balli

Binomial name
- Eremopedes balli Caudell, 1902

Species of cricket-like animal

Eremopedes balli, or Ball's shieldback, is a species of shield-backed katydid in the family Tettigoniidae. It is found in North America.

== Subspecies ==
These two subspecies belong to the species Eremopedes balli:

- Eremopedes balli balli Caudell, 1902
- Eremopedes balli pallidus Tinkham, 1944
