= Hi Vista, California =

Unincorporated community in California, United States

- Unincorporated community
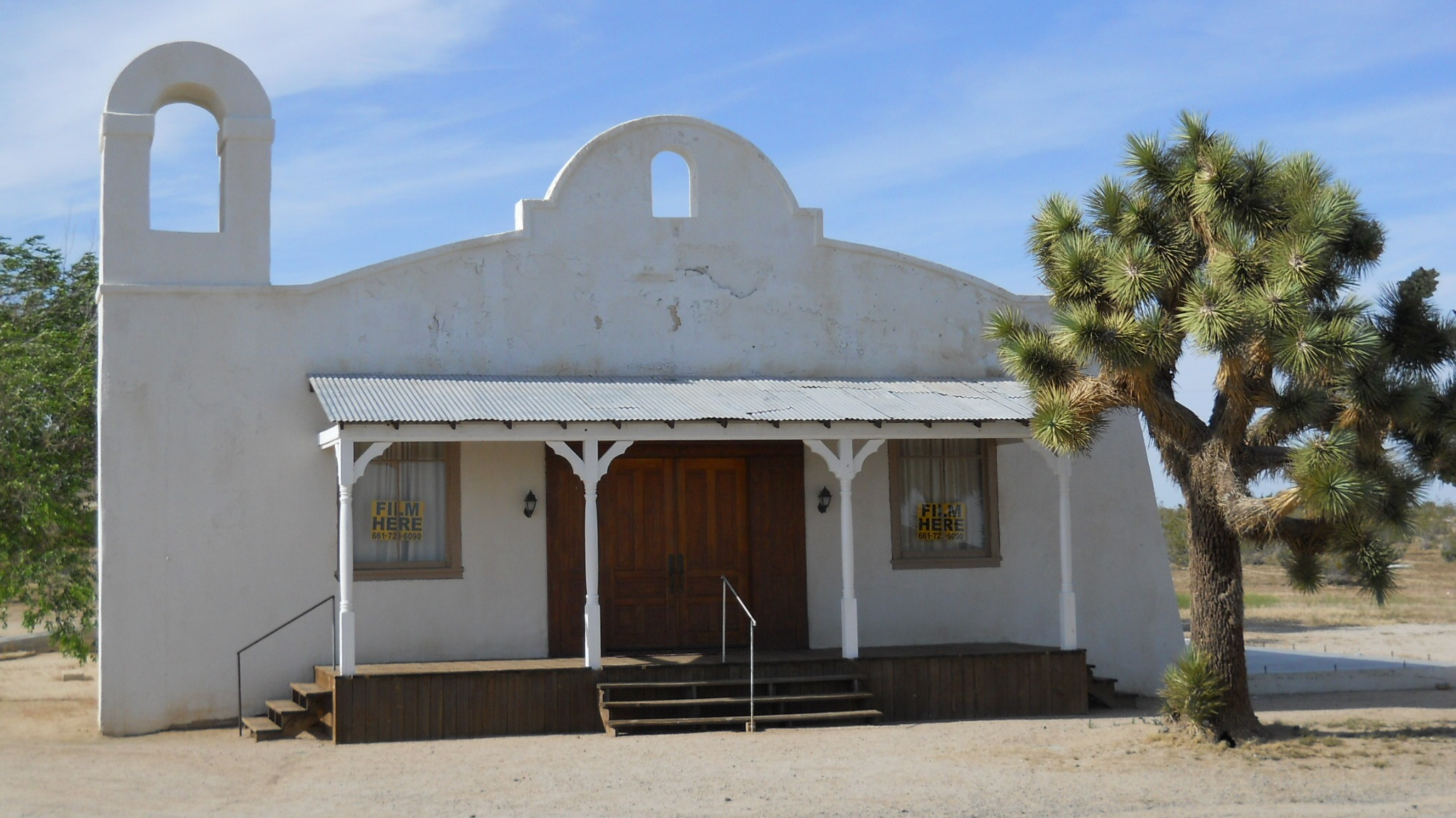
- The Sanctuary Adventist Church

- Location within California Location within the United States
- Coordinates: 34°44′06″N 117°46′38″W
- Country: United States
- State: California
- County: Los Angeles
- Elevation: 3,061 ft (933 m)
- Time zone: UTC-8 (Pacific (PST))
  - Summer (DST): UTC-7 (PDT)
- Area code: 661
- GNIS feature ID: 1660742

Hi Vista (or Hi-Vista) is an unincorporated community in northeastern Los Angeles County, California, United States.

== Geography ==
Hi Vista is located in the Antelope Valley, in the southwestern part of the Mojave Desert. This area is referred to as the "High Desert" due to its altitude. Edwards Air Force Base is located 22 miles (35 km) to the north, Adelanto is 31 miles (50 km) to the east, Lake Los Angeles is 11 miles (18 km) to the south, and Lancaster is 21 miles (34 km) to the west.

== History ==
Hi-Vista was founded about 1930 and named by the wife of the developer for its views of the San Bernardino and the Sierra Madres. Hi-Vista was formerly known for its spring wildflower celebrations. For example, in 1933, after a lunch and educational talk sponsored by the Hi-Vista Improvement Association, visitors would be able to see "coreopsis, hyacinth, lupine, purple sage, aster, primrose, heliotrope, larkspur, wild rhubarb and wild onion plant." The 1964 event was expected to show 150 kinds of flowers, as well as have "a ham dinner and turtle (tortoise) racing."

In 1985 Space Ordnance Systems requested permission to burn industrial waste, including magnesium and Teflon, near Hi-Vista, but residents protested, arguing that the fumes would make them sick and endanger the schoolchildren at Wilsona.

== Parks and recreation ==
Calvary Baptist Church in Hi Vista was used as a filming location for Quentin Tarantino's Kill Bill films, Vol. I & II (2003, 2004), as well as the music video for Road to Nowhere (1985) by Talking Heads.

Hi Vista is home to Saddleback Butte State Park, Butte Valley Wildflower Sanctuary, and The Kill Bill Church. The Phacelia Wildlife Sanctuary, operated by Los Angeles County, was dedicated in 1961. Plant life at the sanctuary includes "creosote bush scrub [and] small Joshua trees," and zebra-tailed lizards and roadrunners are just two of the many animals.

== Population ==
As of 2026, there is an estimated population size of around 111,387 which consists of around 52.1% being Caucasian, 42.1% Hispanic/Latino, 23.5% African American, 4.2% Asian, 2.3% American Indian, 0.5% Native Hawaiian/Pacific Islander, and 23.2% other/mixed race. The gender distribution consists of around 48% being male and 52% being female.

== Education ==
Local students now attend Eastside High School in Lancaster, about 20 miles (32 km) to the west-southwest, rather than Littlerock High School in Littlerock, which was nearly 30 miles (48 km) southwest.
