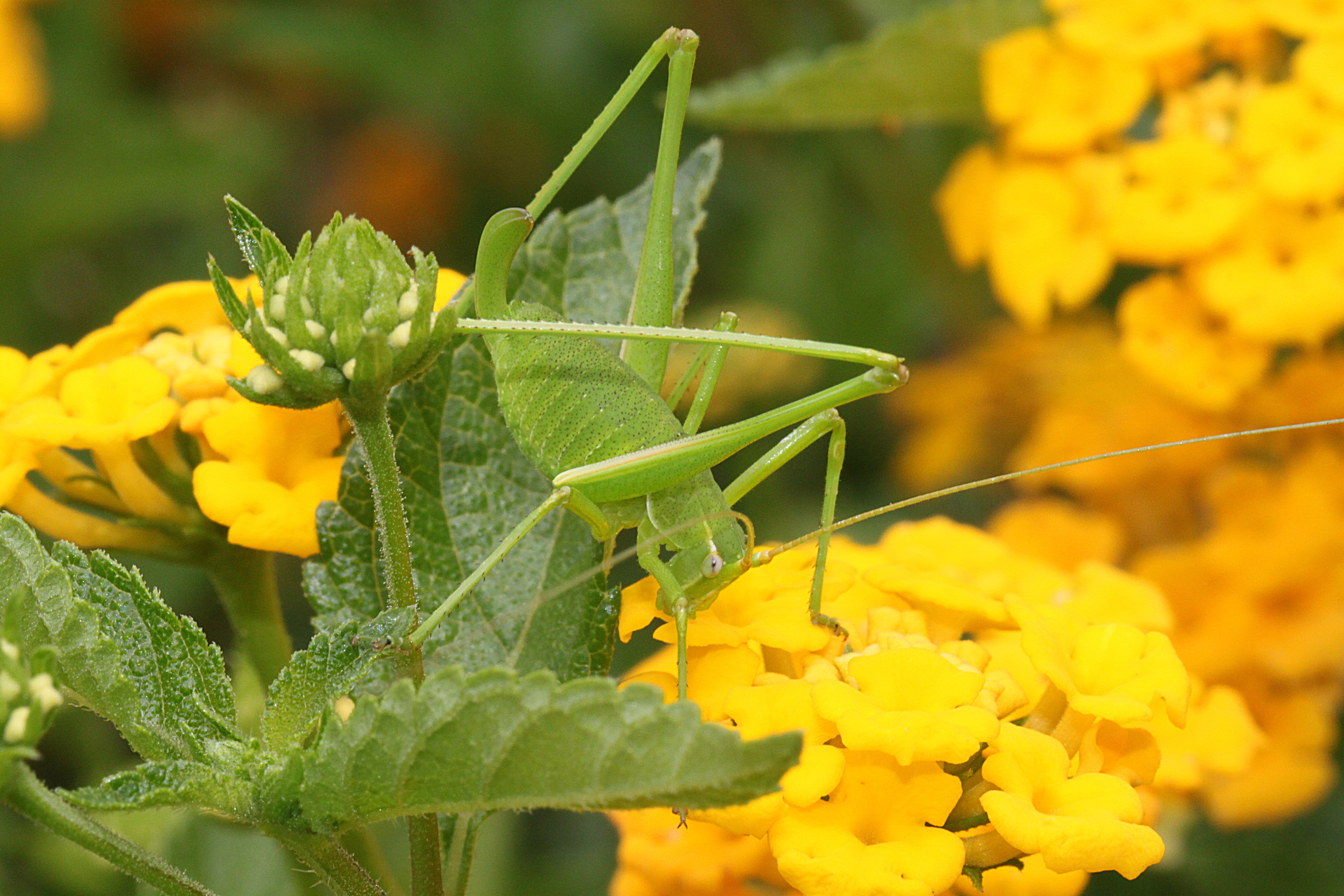

Scientific classification
- Domain: Eukaryota
- Kingdom: Animalia
- Phylum: Arthropoda
- Class: Insecta
- Order: Orthoptera
- Suborder: Ensifera
- Family: Tettigoniidae
- Subfamily: Tettigoniinae
- Tribe: Platycleidini
- Genus: Eremopedes; Cockerell, 1898

= Eremopedes =

Genus of cricket-like animals

Eremopedes is a genus of shield-backed katydids in the family Tettigoniidae. There are about 16 described species in Eremopedes.

== Species ==
These 16 species belong to the genus Eremopedes:

- Eremopedes ateloploides (Caudell, 1907)
- Eremopedes balli Caudell, 1902 (Ball's shieldback)
- Eremopedes bilineatus (Thomas, 1875) (two-lined shieldback)
- Eremopedes californica Rentz, 1972
- Eremopedes colonialis Rentz, 1972
- Eremopedes covilleae Hebard, 1934
- Eremopedes cryptoptera (Rehn & Hebard, 1920)
- Eremopedes cylindricerca Rentz, 1972
- Eremopedes ephippiata Tinkham, 1944
- Eremopedes kelsoensis Tinkham, 1972 (kelso shieldback)
- Eremopedes pintiati Rentz, 1972
- Eremopedes scudderi Cockerell, 1898
- Eremopedes shrevei Tinkham, 1944
- Eremopedes sonorensis Tinkham, 1944
- Eremopedes subcarinatus (Caudell, 1907)
- Eremopedes tectinota Rentz, 1972
