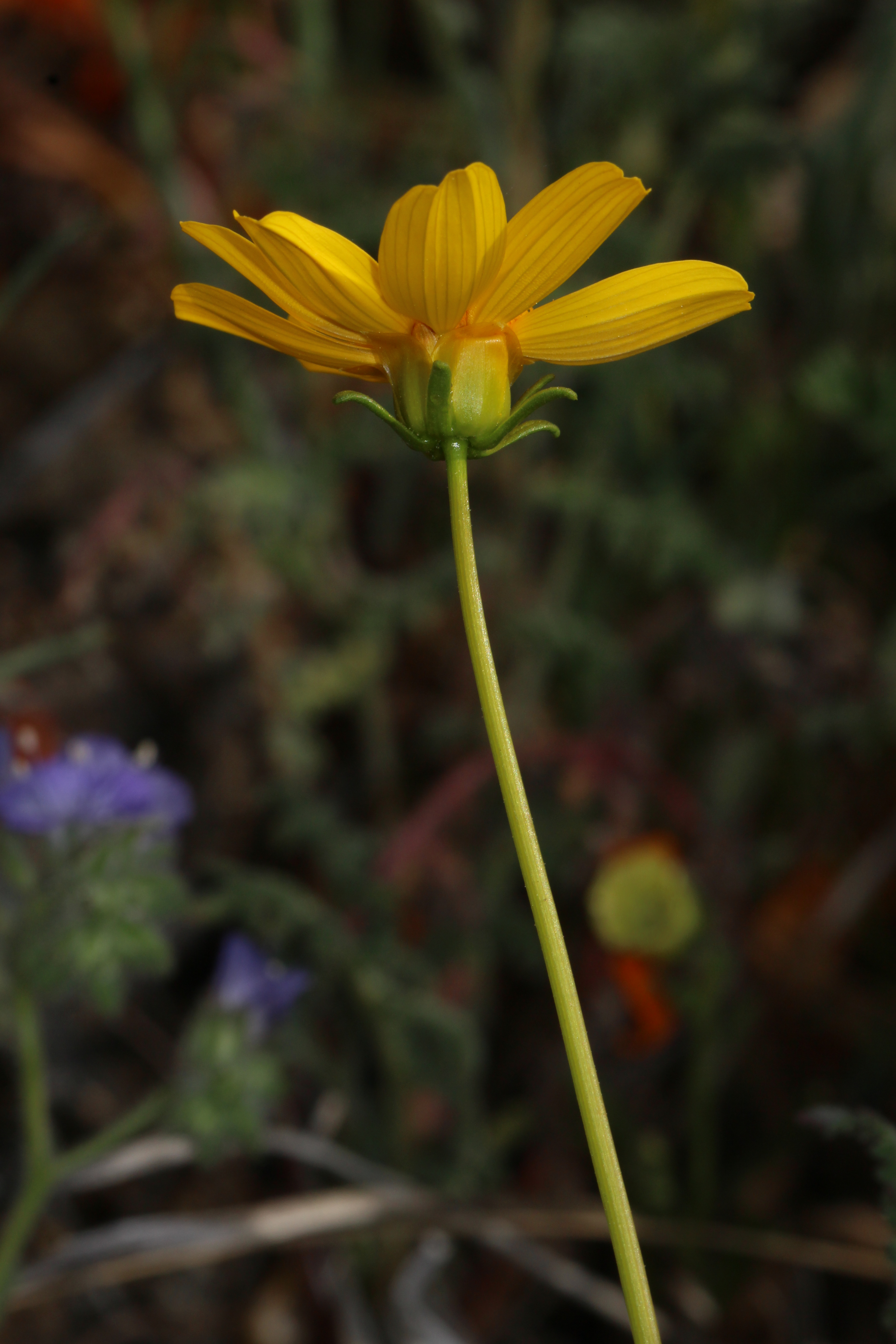

Scientific classification
- Kingdom: Plantae
- Clade: Tracheophytes
- Clade: Angiosperms
- Clade: Eudicots
- Clade: Asterids
- Order: Asterales
- Family: Asteraceae
- Genus: Leptosyne
- Species: L. bigelovii

Binomial name
- Leptosyne bigelovii (A.Gray) A.Gray

Synonyms
- Coreopsis bigelovii (A.Gray) Voss; Pugiopappus bigelovii A.Gray; Pugiopappus breweri A.Gray

= Leptosyne bigelovii =

Species of flowering plant

Leptosyne bigelovii is a species of flowering plant in the daisy or sunflower family, Asteraceae, with the common names Bigelow coreopsis and Bigelow's tickseed. It is endemic to California.

The plant is known from the southern California Coast Ranges, southwestern Sierra Nevada, Transverse Ranges, and the Mojave and Colorado deserts. It is widespread in a number of habitat types from Merced and Inyo Counties south to San Diego County.

== Description ==
Leptosyne bigelovii is annual herb that produces one to many stems with erect, stemlike inflorescences 10 to 30 centimeters tall. The leaves are divided into narrow lobes which are sometimes subdivided, and most of the leaves are located at the base of the plant.

The many inflorescences bear solitary flower heads, each with a bulbous involucre of rough phyllaries. The flower head has a center of many yellow disc florets and a fringe of five to ten ray florets up to 2.5 centimeters (1 inch) long.

The fruit is a small achene. The fruit of the ray floret is rough and bumpy and lacks a pappus; that of the disc floret is more slender, shiny, edged with hairs, and tipped with a pappus of scales.

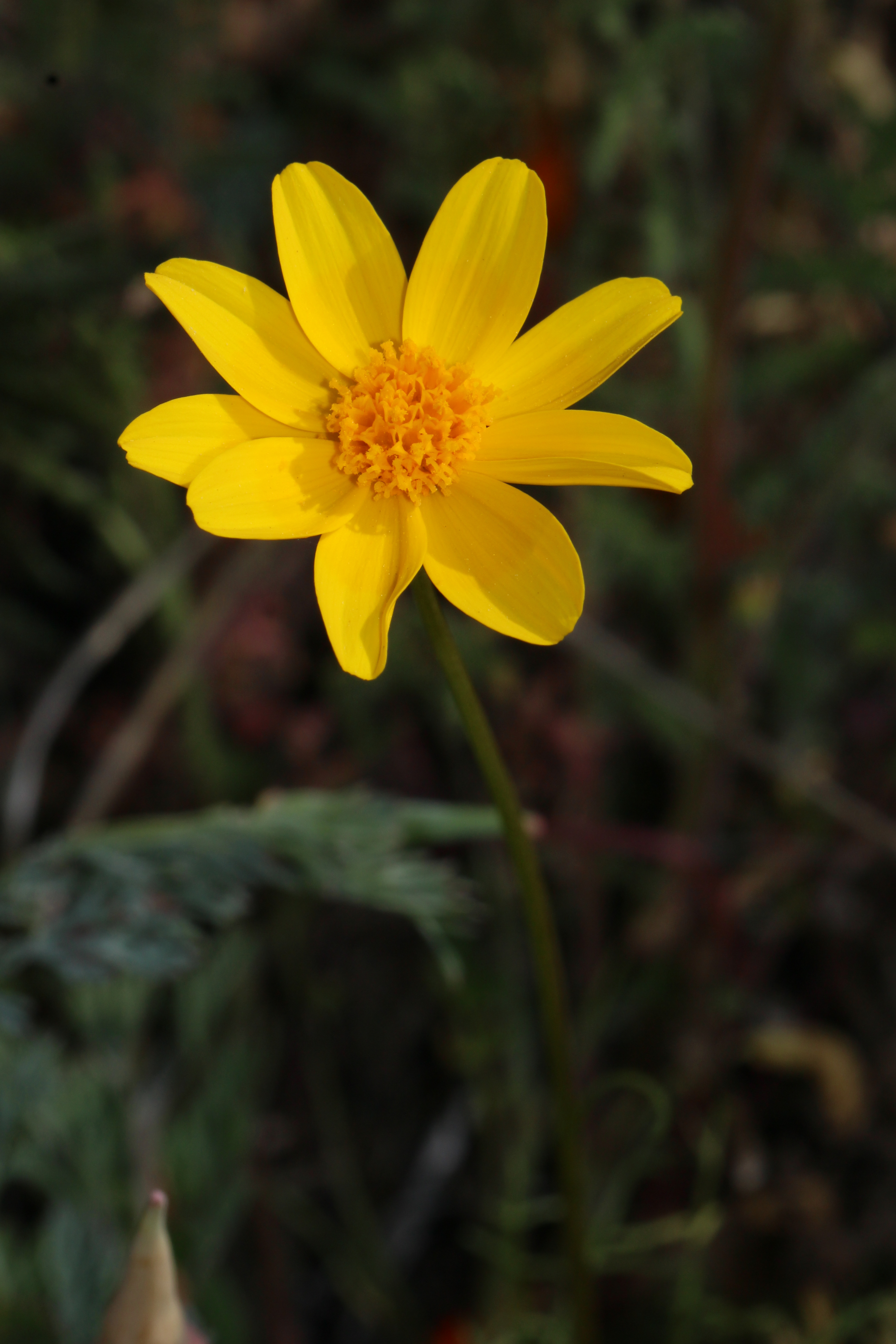
Each flower head consists of many yellow flowers and five to ten ray flowers.

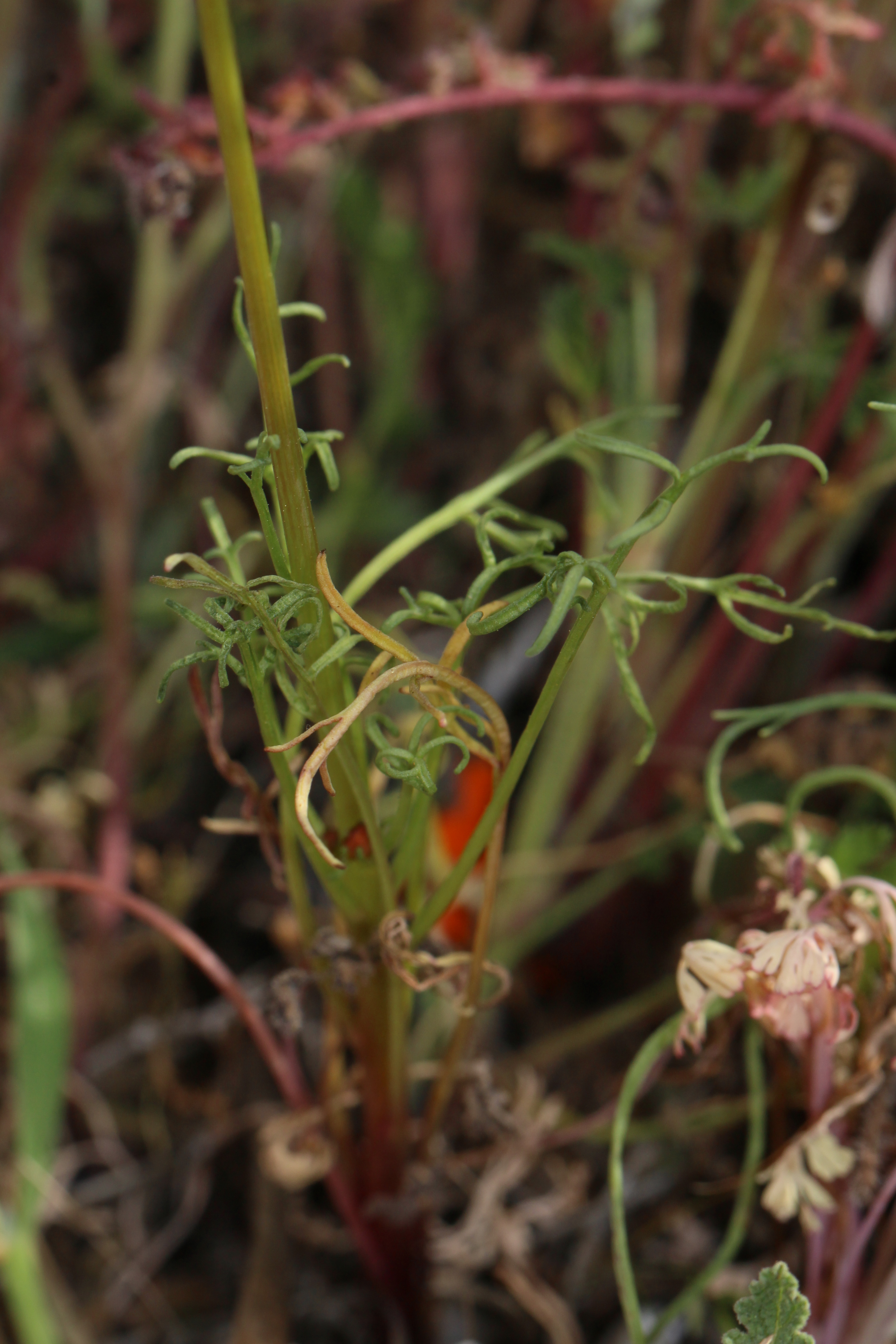
Leaves are divided into narrow lobes, sometimes subdivided.

Leptosyne bigelovii may be distinguished from Leptosyne calliopsidea by its linear outer phyllaries. Leptosyne calliopsidea has triangular to ovate outer phyllaries. The outer phyllaries of Leptosyne californica are narrowly lanceolate and have yellow or red hairs at their base.

== Uses ==
This plant was eaten as a raw or cooked green vegetable by the native Kawaiisu and Tübatulabal peoples of California.
