= Eremopedes scudderi =

Scientific classification
- Domain: Eukaryota
- Kingdom: Animalia
- Phylum: Arthropoda
- Class: Insecta
- Order: Orthoptera
- Suborder: Ensifera
- Family: Tettigoniidae
- Tribe: Platycleidini
- Genus: Eremopedes
- Species: E. scudderi

Binomial name
- Eremopedes scudderi Cockerell, 1898

Species of cricket-like animal

Eremopedes scudderi is a species of shield-backed katydid in the Eremopedes genus, Orthoptera order, Tettigoniidae family, and insecta class. It is found in North America.
