= Arthur B. Ripley Desert Woodland State Park =

State park in Los Angeles County, California, United States

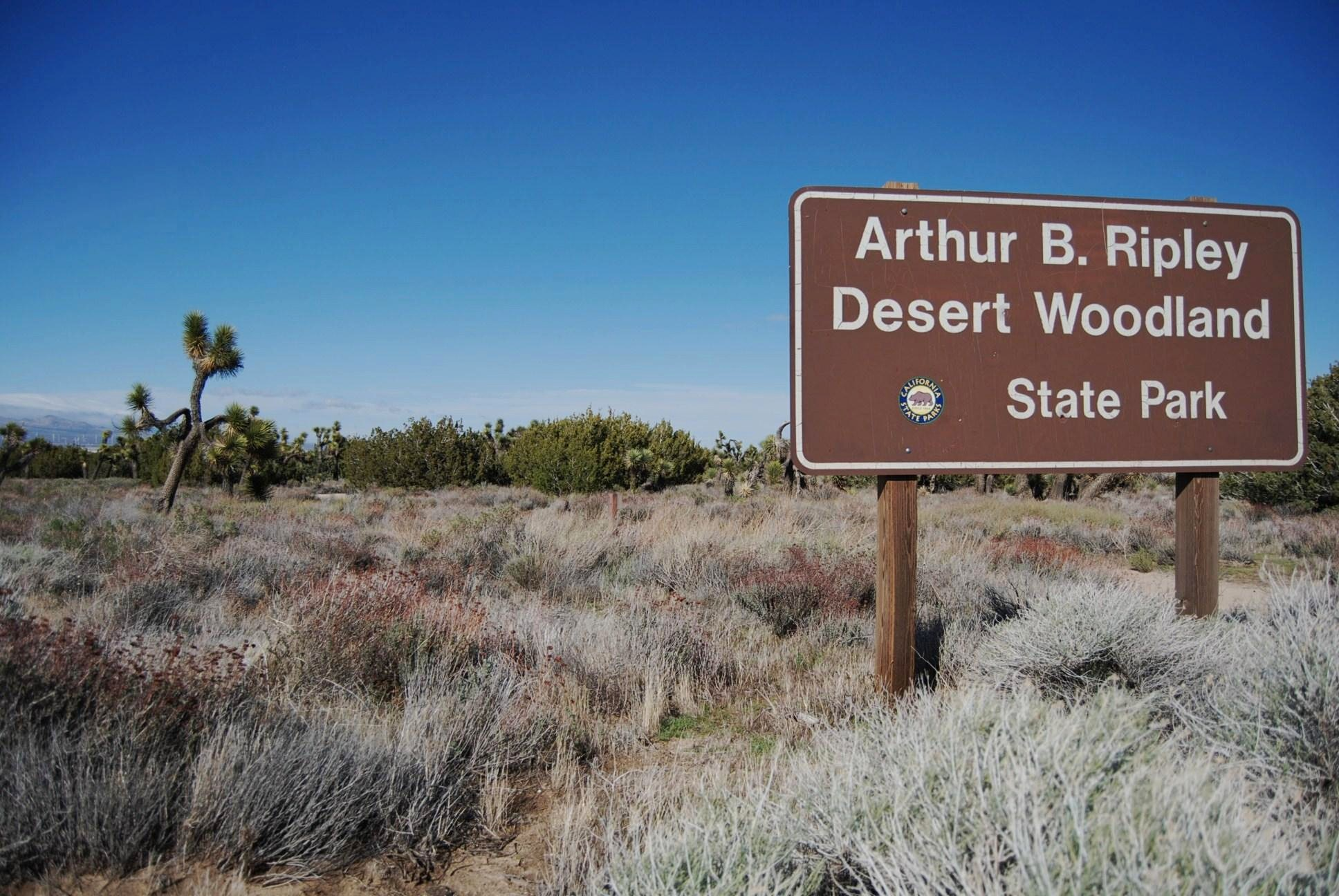
- The state park entrance and landscape.

- Location within California Location within the United States
- Location: Los Angeles County, California, United States
- Nearest city: Lancaster, California
- Coordinates: 34°45′33″N 118°30′11″W
- Area: 566 acres (229 ha)
- Established: 1993
- Governing body: California Department of Parks and Recreation

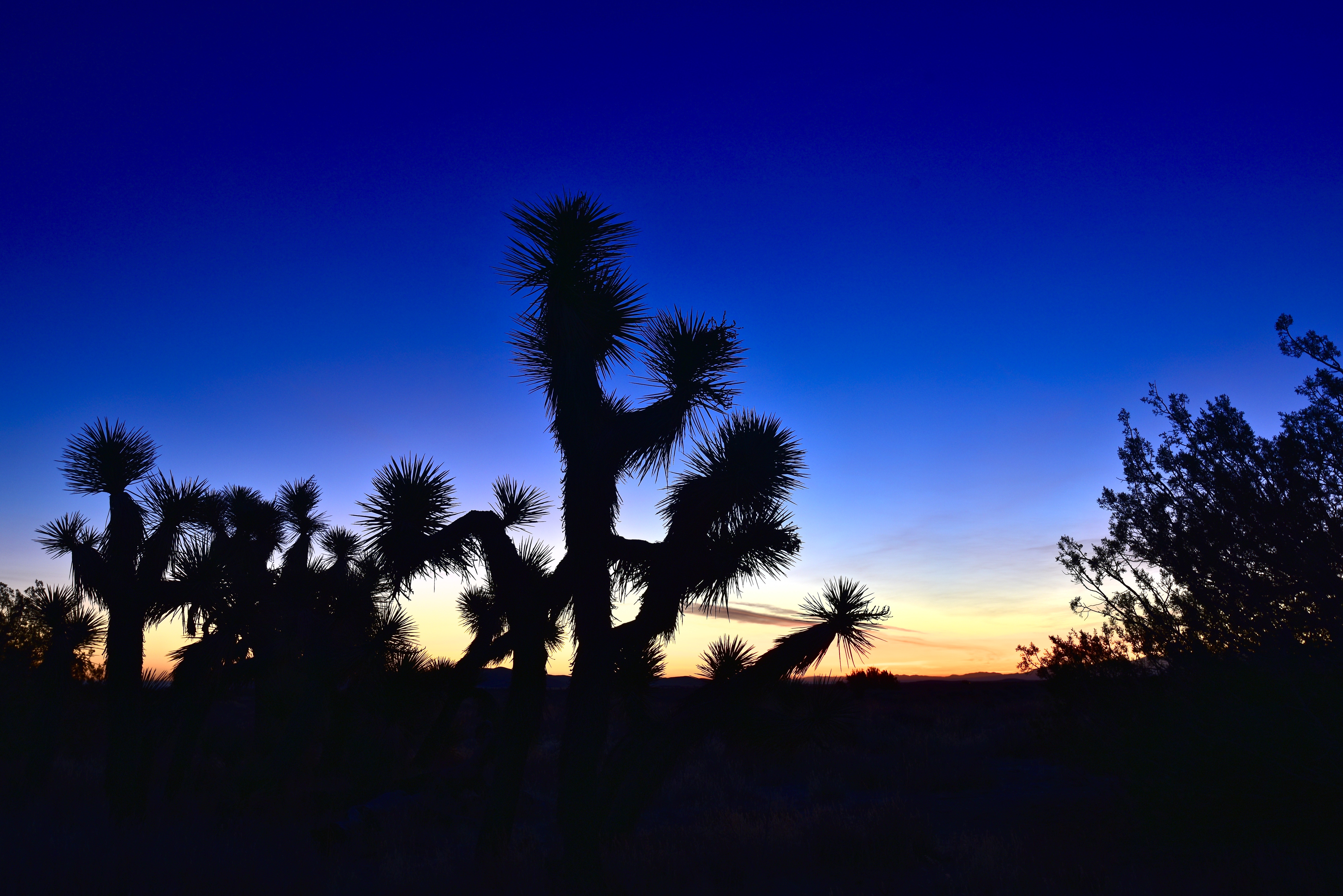
Sunrise at Arthur B. Ripley Desert Woodland State Park. Joshua Trees and Junipers are silhouetted against the sun.

Arthur B. Ripley Desert Woodland State Park is a state park in the western Antelope Valley in Southern California. The park protects mature stands of Joshua trees (Yucca brevifolia) and California juniper trees (Juniperus californica) in their western Mojave Desert habitat.

The park is located in northern Los Angeles County, 20 miles (32 km) west of downtown Lancaster and about 5 miles (8.0 km) from the Antelope Valley California Poppy Reserve.

== History ==
The site was donated to the state in 1988 by farmer Arthur "Archie" Ripley, and preserves a remnant of Joshua/juniper woodland which once grew in great abundance throughout the valley. Today only remnant parcels of this woodland community remain in the valley, much of the rest having been cleared for farming, housing, and some rather esoteric uses — directions for nighttime automobile travelers in the first half of the 20th century and even pulp for newspaper usage. The 566-acre (229 ha) property was officially acquired in 1993.

The Joshua tree played an important part in the cultural history of the Antelope Valley, providing a vital source of food and fiber materials for the Native Americans that inhabited the region.

The Junipers in the park were the subject of botanical research by the late Otis M. (Milt) Stark, a Lancaster wildflower photographer and local historian who was among the volunteers who helped establish trails through the park.

== See also ==
- List of California state parks
- Natural history of the Mojave Desert
- Protected areas of the Mojave Desert
