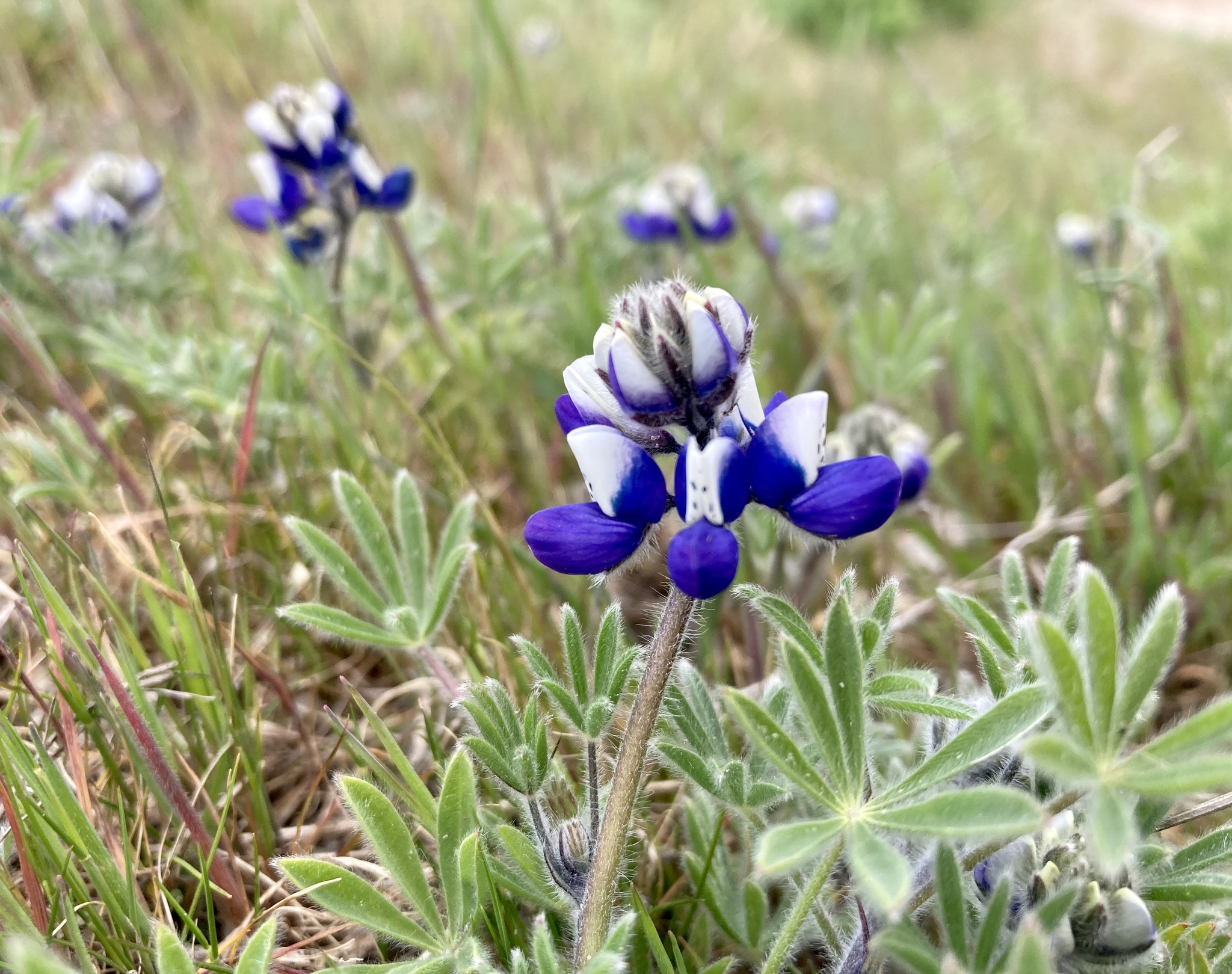

Scientific classification
- Kingdom: Plantae
- Clade: Tracheophytes
- Clade: Angiosperms
- Clade: Eudicots
- Clade: Rosids
- Order: Fabales
- Family: Fabaceae
- Subfamily: Faboideae
- Genus: Lupinus
- Species: L. bicolor

Binomial name
- Lupinus bicolor Lindl.

= Lupinus bicolor =

Species of legume

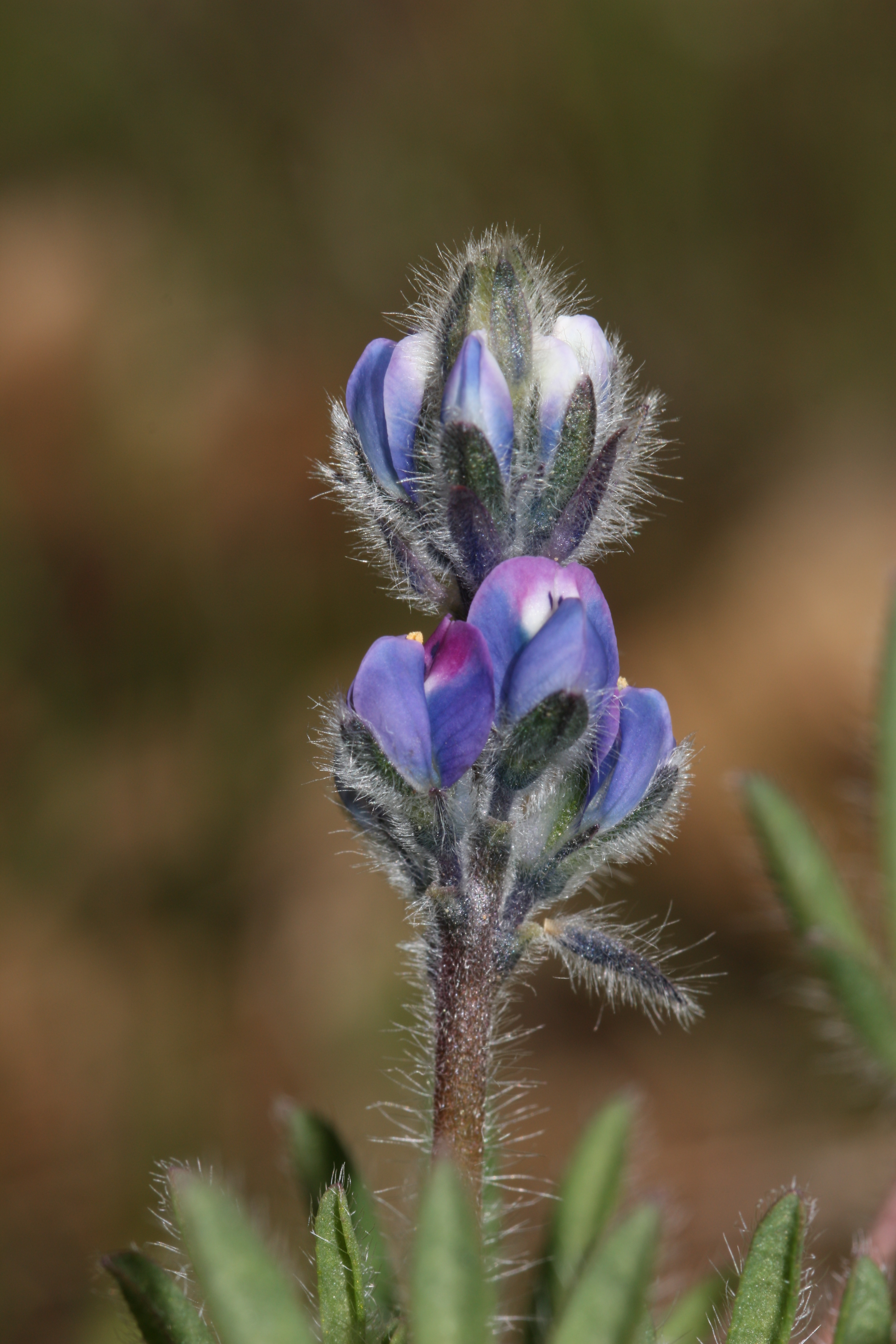
The inflorescence is a raceme at the end of the stalk. Individual flowers are borne on 1–3.5 millimetres (0.039–0.138 in) long pedicels. The banner petal is oblong to circular, typically blue with the center white, 5–7 millimetres (0.20–0.28 in) long.

Lupinus bicolor is a species of lupine known as the miniature lupine, Lindley's annual lupine, pigmy-leaved lupine, or bicolor lupine.

It is a showy flowering annual or perennial plant native to western North America, from northwestern Baja California, throughout California, and north to British Columbia. It is found in diverse habitats below 3,000 feet (910 m), including: grasslands; chaparral; oak, mixed conifer and Joshua tree woodlands; coastal sage scrub; and open conifer forests. It often shares habitats with other prolifically blooming spring and early summer wildflowers, including the California poppy.

== Description ==
Lupinus bicolor has a short, hairy stem and thin, palmately-arranged leaves.

The inflorescence is short for a lupine, at up to 8 centimetres (3.1 in) tall. As its name suggests the flowers are usually two colors, with one often a deep blue. The other color is often white and sometimes a light purple or magenta. There are sometimes small speckles or spots on the petals.

The plant's hairy pods are quite small, only a couple of centimeters long and very thin, and they contain tiny brownish peas.

=== Varieties ===
This plant can be variable in appearance, and there are several varieties/subspecies whose relationships are as yet unclear. Varieties include:

- Lupinus bicolor var. rostratus — endemic to California.
- Lupinus bicolor var. tridentatus — endemic to California.
- Lupinus bicolor var. trifidus — endemic to California.
- Lupinus bicolor var. umbellatus — endemic to California.

== Cultivation ==
Lupinus bicolor is cultivated as an ornamental plant, from seed sown in native plant, drought tolerant, and wildlife gardens, and in natural landscaping and habitat restoration projects.

The plants are of value to pollinators, including native bees and bumble bees. At a local spatial scale, Lupinus bicolor was found to increase the abundance of the native Yellow-faced bumble bee (Bombus vosnesenskii) at restoration sites in Santa Barbara, CA.
