= Eremopedes kelsoensis =

Scientific classification
- Domain: Eukaryota
- Kingdom: Animalia
- Phylum: Arthropoda
- Class: Insecta
- Order: Orthoptera
- Suborder: Ensifera
- Family: Tettigoniidae
- Tribe: Platycleidini
- Genus: Eremopedes
- Species: E. kelsoensis

Binomial name
- Eremopedes kelsoensis Tinkham, 1972

Species of cricket-like animal

Eremopedes kelsoensis, the kelso shieldback, is a species of shield-backed katydid in the family Tettigoniidae. It is found in North America.
