= List of school districts in Los Angeles County, California =

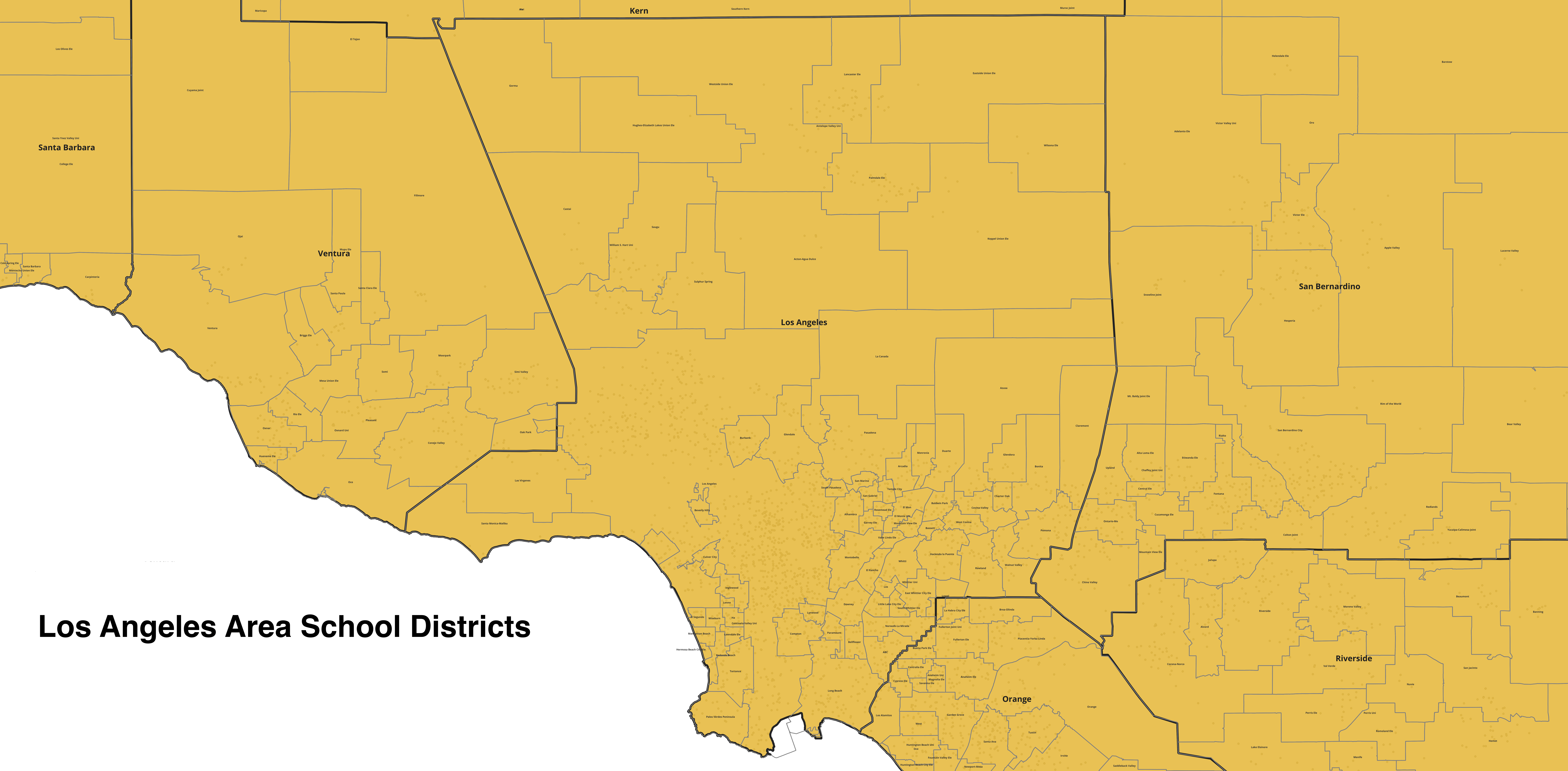
LA area school districts

List of school districts in Los Angeles County, California, United States

== Primary and secondary (K-12) ==
Public school districts

K-12:

- Acton-Agua Dulce Unified School District
- Alhambra Unified School District
- ABC Unified School District
- Arcadia Unified School District
- Azusa Unified School District
- Baldwin Park Unified School District
- Bassett Unified School District
- Bellflower Unified School District
- Beverly Hills Unified School District
- Bonita Unified School District
- Burbank Unified School District
- Charter Oak Unified School District
- Claremont Unified School District
- Compton Unified School District
- Covina-Valley Unified School District
- Culver City Unified School District
- Downey Unified School District
- Duarte Unified School District
- El Rancho Unified School District
- El Segundo Unified School District
- Glendale Unified School District
- Glendora Unified School District
- Hacienda La Puente Unified School District
- Inglewood Unified School District
- La Cañada Unified School District
- Las Virgenes Unified School District
- Long Beach Unified School District
- Los Angeles Unified School District
- Lynwood Unified School District
- Manhattan Beach Unified School District
- Monrovia Unified School District
- Montebello Unified School District
- Norwalk-La Mirada Unified School District
- Palos Verdes Peninsula Unified School District
- Paramount Unified School District
- Pasadena Unified School District
- Pomona Unified School District
- Redondo Beach Unified School District
- Rowland Unified School District
- San Gabriel Unified School District
- San Marino Unified School District
- Santa Monica-Malibu Unified School District
- Snowline Joint Unified School District
- South Pasadena Unified School District
- Temple City Unified School District
- Torrance Unified School District
- Walnut Valley Unified School District
- West Covina Unified School District
- Wiseburn Unified School District

Secondary:

- Antelope Valley Union Joint High School District
- Centinela Valley Union High School District
- Chaffey Joint Union High School District
- El Monte Union High School District
- Fullerton Joint Union High School District
- Whittier Union High School District
- William S. Hart Union High School District

Elementary:

- Castaic Union School District
- East Whittier City Elementary School District
- Eastside Union Elementary School District
- El Monte City School District
- Garvey Elementary School District
- Gorman Elementary School District
- Hawthorne Elementary School District
- Hermosa Beach City Elementary School District
- Hughes-Elizabeth Lakes Union Elementary School District
- Keppel Union Elementary School District
- Lancaster Elementary School District
- Lawndale Elementary School District
- Lennox Elementary School District
- Little Lake City Elementary School District
- Los Nietos School District
- Lowell Joint Elementary School District
- Mountain View Elementary School District
- Mount Baldy Joint Elementary School District
- Newhall Elementary School District
- Palmdale Elementary School District
- Rosemead Elementary School District
- Saugus Union Elementary School District
- South Whittier Elementary School District
- Sulphur Springs School District
- Valle Lindo Elementary School District
- Westside Union Elementary School District
- Whittier City Elementary School District
- Wilsona Elementary School District

Former districts:

- Los Angeles City School District
- Los Angeles City High School District (a.k.a. West County Union High School District)
- South Bay Union High School District

== Post-secondary ==
1. Los Angeles Community College District
2. Long Beach Community College District
3. Cerritos Community College District
4. El Camino Community College District
5. Rio Hondo Community College District
6. Mt. San Antonio Community College District
7. Citrus Community College District
8. Antelope Valley Community College District
9. Pasadena Area Community College District
10. Glendale Community College District
11. Santa Monica Community College District
12. Santa Clarita Community College District
13. Compton Community College District
