= Golden League (California) =

The Golden League is a high school athletic conference in Los Angeles County, California affiliated with the CIF Southern Section. All the current schools are part of the Antelope Valley Union High School District.

== Schools ==
As of 2014, the schools in the league are:

- Antelope Valley High School
- Eastside High School
- Highland High School
- Knight High School
- Lancaster High School
- Littlerock High School
- Palmdale High School
- Quartz Hill High School
