= Demographics of Los Angeles County =

Demographic information on Los Angeles County, California, USA

Historical population
Census	Pop.	Note	%±
1850	3,530		—
1860	11,333		221.0%
1870	15,309		35.1%
1880	33,381		118.0%
1890	101,454		203.9%
1900	170,298		67.9%
1910	504,131		196.0%
1920	936,455		85.8%
1930	2,208,492		135.8%
1940	2,785,643		26.1%
1950	4,151,687		49.0%
1960	6,038,771		45.5%
1970	7,041,980		16.6%
1980	7,477,421		6.2%
1990	8,863,164		18.5%
2000	9,519,338		7.4%
2010	9,818,605		3.1%
2020	10,014,009		2.0%
U.S. Decennial Census; 1790-1960 1900-1990; 1990-2000 2010–2014

The demographics of Los Angeles County include a diverse people by race, ethnicity, and nationality. It is a majority minority county.

== Religion ==
As of 2000, there are over 1,700 Christian churches, 202 Jewish synagogues, 145 Buddhist temples, 48 Islamic mosques, 44 Baháʼí worship centers, 37 Hindu temples, 28 Tenrikyo churches and fellowships, 16 Shinto worship centers, and 14 Sikh gurdwaras in the county. The Los Angeles Archdiocese has approximately 5 million members and is the largest in the United States.

== Housing ==
The homeownership rate is 47.9%, and the median value for houses is $409,300. 42.2% of housing units are in multi-unit structures.

== Undocumented immigrants ==
In 1971, there were around an estimated 190,000 undocumented immigrants in the Los Angeles County.

As estimated by the Public Policy Institute of California in 2008, Los Angeles County is home to more than one-third of California's undocumented immigrants, who make up more than ten percent of the population.

== Place of birth ==
The majority of Los Angeles County's immigrants came from Mexico, followed El Salvador and the Philippines.

== Population by race / ethnicity ==
Los Angeles County, California – Racial and ethnic composition Note: the US Census treats Hispanic/Latino as an ethnic category. This table excludes Latinos from the racial categories and assigns them to a separate category. Hispanics/Latinos may be of any race.
Race / Ethnicity (NH = Non-Hispanic)	Pop 1980	Pop 1990	Pop 2000	Pop 2010	Pop 2020	% 1980	% 1990	% 2000	% 2010	% 2020
White alone (NH)	3,953,603	3,618,850	2,959,614	2,728,321	2,563,609	52.87%	40.83%	31.09%	27.79%	25.60%
Black or African American alone (NH)	926,360	934,776	901,472	815,086	760,689	12.39%	10.55%	9.47%	8.30%	7.60%
Native American or Alaska Native alone (NH)	48,120	29,159	25,609	18,886	18,453	0.64%	0.33%	0.27%	0.19%	0.18%
Asian alone (NH)	434,850	907,810	1,124,569	1,325,671	1,474,237	5.82%	10.24%	11.81%	13.50%	14.72%
Native Hawaiian or Pacific Islander alone (NH)	x	x	23,265	22,464	20,522	x	x	0.24%	0.23%	0.20%
Other race alone (NH)	48,467	21,327	19,935	25,367	58,683	0.65%	0.24%	0.21%	0.26%	0.59%
Mixed race or Multiracial (NH)	x	x	222,661	194,921	313,053	x	x	2.34%	1.99%	3.13%
Hispanic or Latino (any race)	2,066,103	3,351,242	4,242,213	4,687,889	4,804,763	27.63%	37.81%	44.56%	47.74%	47.98%
Total	7,477,503	8,863,164	9,519,338	9,818,605	10,014,009	100.00%	100.00%	100.00%	100.00%	100.00%

=== Racial / Ethnic profile of places in Los Angeles County, California ===
Racial / Ethnic profile of places in Los Angeles County, California (2020 census)
Following is a table of cities and census designated places in Los Angeles County. Data for the United States (with and without Puerto Rico), the state of California, and Los Angeles County itself have been included for comparison purposes.
The majority racial/ethnic group is coded per the key below.

Majority minority with no dominant group
Majority White
Majority Black
Majority Hispanic
Majority Asian

Racial and ethnic composition of places in Los Angeles County, California (2020 Census) (NH = Non-Hispanic) Note: the US Census treats Hispanic/Latino as an ethnic category. This table excludes Latinos from the racial categories and assigns them to a separate category. Hispanics/Latinos may be of any race.
Place	Designation	Total Population	White alone (NH)	%	Black or African American alone (NH)	%	Native American or Alaska Native alone (NH)	%	Asian alone (NH)	%	Native Hawaiian or Pacific Islander alone (NH)	%	Other race alone (NH)	%	Mixed race or Multiracial (NH)	%	Hispanic or Latino (any race)	%
United States of America (50 states and D.C.)	x	331,449,281	191,697,647	57.84%	39,940,338	12.05%	2,251,699	0.68%	19,618,719	5.92%	622,018	0.19%	1,689,833	0.51%	13,548,983	4.09%	62,080,044	18.73%
United States of America (50 states, D.C., and Puerto Rico)	x	334,735,155	191,722,195	57.28%	39,944,624	11.93%	2,252,011	0.67%	19,621,465	5.86%	622,109	0.19%	1,692,341	0.51%	13,551,323	4.05%	65,329,087	19.52%
California	State	39,538,223	13,714,587	34.69%	2,119,286	5.36%	156,085	0.39%	5,978,795	15.12%	138,167	0.35%	223,929	0.57%	1,627,722	4.12%	15,579,652	39.40%
Los Angeles County	County	10,014,009	2,563,609	25.60%	760,689	7.60%	18,453	0.18%	1,474,237	14.72%	20,522	0.20%	58,683	0.59%	313,053	3.13%	4,804,763	47.98%
Los Angeles	City	3,898,747	1,126,052	28.88%	322,553	8.27%	6,614	0.17%	454,585	11.66%	4,573	0.12%	26,351	0.68%	128,028	3.28%	1,829,991	46.94%
Long Beach	City	466,742	121,970	26.13%	55,894	11.98%	1,119	0.24%	59,308	12.71%	3,937	0.84%	2,736	0.59%	19,781	4.24%	201,997	43.28%
Santa Clarita	City	228,673	101,794	44.52%	9,046	3.96%	458	0.20%	26,797	11.72%	291	0.13%	1,309	0.57%	10,243	4.48%	78,735	34.43%
Glendale	City	196,543	122,519	62.34%	3,365	1.71%	203	0.10%	29,461	14.99%	120	0.06%	709	0.36%	6,591	3.35%	33,575	17.08%
Lancaster	City	173,516	42,321	24.39%	35,497	20.46%	704	0.41%	7,699	4.44%	250	0.14%	1,299	0.75%	7,408	4.27%	78,338	45.15%
Palmdale	City	169,450	28,739	16.96%	22,000	12.98%	489	0.29%	7,007	4.14%	278	0.16%	1,112	0.66%	5,083	3.00%	104,742	61.81%
Pomona	City	151,713	15,669	10.33%	8,116	5.35%	386	0.25%	15,853	10.45%	235	0.15%	697	0.46%	2,713	1.79%	108,044	71.22%
Torrance	City	147,067	51,913	35.30%	4,781	3.25%	235	0.16%	51,857	35.26%	523	0.36%	980	0.67%	8,698	5.91%	28,080	19.09%
Pasadena	City	138,699	50,858	36.67%	10,795	7.78%	201	0.14%	24,149	17.41%	130	0.09%	835	0.60%	5,989	4.32%	45,742	32.98%
East Los Angeles	CDP	118,786	2,399	2.02%	638	0.54%	199	0.17%	1,648	1.39%	19	0.02%	331	0.28%	516	0.43%	113,036	95.16%
Downey	City	114,355	14,378	12.57%	3,930	3.44%	251	0.22%	7,311	6.39%	249	0.22%	691	0.60%	1,679	1.47%	85,866	75.09%
West Covina	City	109,501	11,793	10.77%	3,713	3.39%	217	0.20%	33,097	30.23%	149	0.14%	541	0.49%	1,889	1.73%	58,102	53.06%
El Monte	City	109,450	3,667	3.35%	745	0.68%	146	0.13%	32,940	30.10%	34	0.03%	356	0.33%	743	0.68%	70,819	64.70%
Inglewood	City	107,762	4,398	4.08%	40,804	37.86%	199	0.18%	2,107	1.96%	331	0.31%	855	0.79%	3,391	3.15%	55,677	51.67%
Burbank	City	107,337	60,350	56.22%	2,891	2.69%	222	0.21%	12,282	11.44%	98	0.09%	618	0.58%	4,915	4.58%	25,961	24.19%
Norwalk	City	102,773	8,919	8.68%	3,849	3.75%	294	0.29%	13,680	13.31%	370	0.36%	486	0.47%	1,627	1.58%	73,548	71.56%
Compton	City	95,740	856	0.89%	24,342	25.43%	132	0.14%	365	0.38%	544	0.57%	440	0.46%	1,270	1.33%	67,791	70.81%
Carson	City	95,558	6,569	6.87%	21,264	22.25%	185	0.19%	25,011	26.17%	1,585	1.66%	484	0.51%	2,817	2.95%	37,643	39.39%
Santa Monica	City	93,076	60,654	65.17%	3,623	3.89%	129	0.14%	8,466	9.10%	109	0.12%	805	0.86%	5,746	6.17%	13,544	14.55%
South Gate	City	92,726	2,285	2.46%	884	0.95%	119	0.13%	609	0.66%	31	0.03%	338	0.36%	420	0.45%	88,040	94.95%
Hawthorne	City	88,083	9,147	10.38%	20,763	23.57%	128	0.15%	6,552	7.44%	683	0.78%	773	0.88%	2,727	3.10%	47,310	53.71%
Whittier	City	87,306	18,018	20.64%	1,014	1.16%	248	0.28%	3,967	4.54%	122	0.14%	440	0.50%	1,964	1.94%	61,803	70.79%
Alhambra	City	82,868	6,942	8.38%	1,345	1.62%	137	0.17%	42,552	51.35%	70	0.08%	306	0.37%	1,606	1.94%	29,910	36.09%
Lakewood	City	82,496	25,882	31.37%	6,530	7.92%	215	0.26%	15,137	18.35%	645	0.78%	448	0.54%	4,157	5.04%	29,482	35.74%
Bellflower	City	79,190	10,815	13.66%	10,131	12.79%	183	0.23%	9,855	12.44%	531	0.67%	376	0.47%	2,049	2.59%	45,250	57.14%
Baldwin Park	City	72,176	2,391	3.31%	609	0.84%	92	0.13%	14,590	20.21%	44	0.06%	266	0.37%	501	0.69%	53,683	74.38%
Redondo Beach	City	71,576	40,796	57.00%	2,103	2.94%	187	0.26%	10,085	14.09%	183	0.26%	532	0.74%	5,193	7.26%	12,497	17.46%
Lynwood	City	67,265	1,212	1.80%	5,301	7.88%	64	0.10%	397	0.59%	182	0.27%	278	0.41%	404	0.60%	59,427	88.35%
Montebello	City	62,640	4,460	7.12%	472	0.75%	106	0.17%	7,793	12.44%	66	0.11%	196	0.31%	533	0.85%	49,014	78.25%
Pico Rivera	City	62,088	2,606	4.20%	383	0.62%	130	0.21%	2,067	3.33%	30	0.05%	267	0.43%	356	0.57%	56,249	90.60%
Florence-Graham	CDP	61,983	619	1.00%	4,149	6.69%	82	0.13%	185	0.30%	8	0.01%	289	0.47%	351	0.57%	56,300	90.83%
Monterey Park	City	61,096	2,384	3.90%	358	0.59%	64	0.10%	40,353	66.05%	45	0.07%	174	0.28%	950	1.55%	16,768	27.45%
Gardena	City	61,027	4,819	7.90%	13,006	21.31%	106	0.17%	15,813	25.91%	356	0.58%	364	0.60%	2,060	3.38%	24,503	40.15%
Arcadia	City	56,681	9,968	17.59%	868	1.53%	53	0.09%	36,608	64.59%	40	0.07%	239	0.42%	1,504	2.65%	7,401	13.06%
South Whittier	CDP	56,415	6,846	12.14%	643	1.14%	139	0.25%	2,585	4.58%	103	0.18%	230	0.41%	789	1.40%	45,080	79.91%
Diamond Bar	City	55,072	8,117	14.74%	1,717	3.12%	56	0.10%	32,626	59.24%	79	0.14%	179	0.33%	1,495	2.71%	10,803	19.62%
Huntington Park	City	54,883	759	1.38%	389	0.71%	22	0.04%	313	0.57%	21	0.04%	202	0.37%	191	0.35%	52,986	96.54%
Hacienda Heights	CDP	54,191	5,830	10.76%	530	0.98%	95	0.18%	22,287	41.13%	59	0.11%	172	0.32%	864	1.59%	24,354	44.94%
Paramount	City	53,733	2,273	4.23%	4,970	9.25%	94	0.17%	1,703	3.17%	225	0.42%	208	0.39%	640	1.19%	43,620	81.18%
Glendora	City	52,558	23,384	44.49%	1,021	1.94%	120	0.23%	6,656	12.66%	24	0.05%	274	0.52%	2,062	3.92%	19,017	36.18%
Covina	City	51,268	10,051	19.60%	1,748	3.41%	156	0.30%	7,571	14.77%	87	0.17%	268	0.52%	1,279	2.49%	30,108	58.73%
Rosemead	City	51,185	1,664	3.25%	221	0.43%	42	0.08%	32,758	64.00%	20	0.04%	130	0.25%	444	0.87%	15,906	31.08%
Azusa	City	50,000	7,751	15.50%	1,589	3.18%	113	0.23%	7,187	14.37%	65	0.13%	234	0.47%	1,041	2.08%	32,020	64.04%
Cerritos	City	49,578	6,340	12.79%	3,155	6.36%	61	0.12%	30,810	62.14%	191	0.39%	240	0.48%	1,689	3.41%	7,092	14.30%
Rowland Heights	CDP	48,231	3,467	7.19%	655	1.36%	45	0.09%	29,583	61.34%	53	0.11%	144	0.30%	769	1.59%	13,515	28.02%
La Mirada	City	48,008	13,508	28.14%	1,002	2.09%	126	0.26%	10,820	22.54%	103	0.21%	241	0.50%	1,556	3.24%	20,652	43.02%
Altadena	CDP	42,846	17,900	41.78%	7,136	16.65%	46	0.11%	2,919	6.81%	47	0.11%	293	0.68%	2,334	5.45%	12,171	28.41%
Rancho Palos Verdes	City	42,287	20,480	48.43%	1,086	2.57%	38	0.09%	13,424	31.74%	32	0.08%	301	0.71%	2,391	5.65%	4,535	10.72%
Culver City	City	40,779	18,544	45.47%	3,143	7.71%	47	0.12%	6,832	16.75%	92	0.23%	379	0.93%	3,010	7.38%	8,732	21.41%
San Gabriel	City	39,568	3,381	8.54%	355	0.90%	42	0.11%	25,068	63.35%	16	0.04%	100	0.25%	728	1.84%	9,878	24.96%
Bell Gardens	City	39,501	740	1.87%	220	0.56%	98	0.25%	200	0.51%	19	0.05%	106	0.27%	124	0.31%	37,994	96.18%
La Puente	City	38,062	1,257	3.30%	386	1.01%	44	0.12%	4,846	12.73%	46	0.12%	133	0.35%	270	0.71%	31,080	81.66%
Monrovia	City	37,931	12,903	34.02%	1,955	5.15%	66	0.17%	6,210	16.37%	30	0.08%	227	0.60%	1,553	4.09%	14,987	39.51%
Claremont	City	37,266	17,628	47.30%	1,793	4.78%	90	0.24%	5,809	15.59%	49	0.13%	272	0.73%	2,219	5.95%	9,416	25.27%
Temple City	City	36,494	4,896	13.42%	260	0.71%	55	0.15%	23,187	63.54%	13	0.04%	155	0.42%	821	2.25%	7,107	19.47%
West Hollywood	City	35,757	25,397	71.03%	1,302	3.64%	49	0.14%	2,273	6.36%	41	0.11%	309	0.86%	1,889	5.28%	4,497	12.58%
Manhattan Beach	City	35,506	25,353	71.40%	305	0.86%	28	0.08%	3,995	11.25%	29	0.08%	240	0.68%	2,484	7.00%	3,072	8.65%
San Dimas	City	34,924	14,275	40.87%	1,200	3.44%	89	0.25%	4,868	13.94%	26	0.07%	196	0.56%	1,325	3.79%	12,945	37.07%
Westmont	CDP	33,913	427	1.26%	13,717	40.45%	59	0.17%	194	0.57%	59	0.17%	231	0.68%	831	2.45%	18,395	54.24%
Bell	City	33,559	1,484	4.42%	124	0.37%	35	0.10%	237	0.71%	15	0.04%	101	0.30%	171	0.51%	31,392	93.54%
Beverly Hills	City	32,701	24,894	76.13%	662	2.02%	13	0.04%	2,865	8.76%	11	0.03%	261	0.80%	1,777	5.43%	2,218	6.78%
Lawndale	City	31,807	4,549	14.30%	2,538	7.98%	75	0.24%	3,208	10.09%	185	0.58%	248	0.78%	986	3.10%	20,018	62.94%
La Verne	City	31,334	14,373	45.87%	906	2.89%	81	0.26%	3,379	10.78%	47	0.15%	183	0.58%	1,180	3.77%	11,185	35.70%
Walnut	City	28,430	2.589	9.11%	676	2.38%	10	0.04%	19.063	67.05%	17	0.06%	112	0.39%	639	2.25%	5,324	18.73%
South Pasadena	City	26,943	9,692	35.97%	638	2.37%	28	0.10%	9,135	33.90%	9	0.03%	172	0.64%	1,685	6.25%	5,584	20.73%
West Whittier-Los Nietos	CDP	25,325	1,838	7.26%	201	0.79%	85	0.34%	478	1.89%	40	0.16%	117	0.46%	196	0.77%	22,370	88.33%
Maywood	City	25,138	361	1.44%	106	0.42%	29	0.12%	80	0.32%	1	0.00%	66	0.26%	95	0.38%	24,400	97.06%
West Rancho Dominguez	CDP	24,347	434	1.78%	9,745	40.03%	32	0.13%	240	0.99%	66	0.27%	117	0.48%	505	2.07%	13,208	54.25%
Willowbrook	CDP	24,295	259	1.07%	4,365	17.97%	32	0.13%	115	0.47%	34	0.14%	86	0.35%	231	0.95%	19,173	78.92%
San Fernando	City	23,946	1,234	5.15%	282	1.18%	66	0.28%	353	1.47%	11	0.05%	76	0.32%	154	0.64%	21,770	90.91%
Calabasas	City	23,241	17,175	73.90%	515	2.22%	31	0.13%	2,184	9.40%	12	0.05%	170	0.73%	1,200	5.16%	1,954	8.41%
West Puente Valley	CDP	22,959	713	3.11%	311	1.35%	35	0.15%	3,299	14.37%	40	0.17%	95	0.41%	168	0.73%	18,298	79.70%
West Carson	CDP	22,870	3,761	16.45%	2,176	9.51%	63	0.28%	7,886	34.48%	253	1.11%	124	0.54%	824	3.60%	7,783	34.03%
Cudahy	City	22,811	401	1.76%	167	0.73%	37	0.16%	157	0.69%	26	0.11%	64	0.28%	87	0.38%	21,872	95.88%
East San Gabriel	CDP	22,769	3,145	13.81%	255	1.12%	31	0.14%	12,481	54.82%	16	0.07%	99	0.43%	524	2.30%	6,218	27.31%
Valinda	CDP	22,437	1,117	4.98%	281	1.25%	47	0.21%	3,815	17.00%	44	0.20%	85	0.38%	201	0.90%	16,847	75.09%
Duarte	City	21,727	4,892	22.52%	1,126	5.18%	59	0.27%	4,507	20.74%	15	0.07%	101	0.46%	591	2.72%	10,436	48.03%
Lomita	City	20,921	7,269	34.74%	1,129	5.40%	57	0.27%	3,456	16.42%	128	0.61%	133	0.64%	1,078	5.15%	7,691	36.76%
La Cañada Flintridge	City	20,573	11,127	54.09%	129	0.63%	24	0.12%	6,408	31.15%	2	0.01%	129	0.63%	1,037	5.04%	1,717	8.35%
Lennox	CDP	20,323	367	1.81%	746	3.67%	19	0.09%	217	1.07%	110	0.54%	93	0.46%	102	0.50%	18,669	91.86%
Agoura Hills	City	20,299	14,744	72.63%	250	1.23%	23	0.11%	1,740	8.57%	6	0.03%	130	0.64%	1,087	5.35%	2,319	11.42%
Stevenson Ranch	CDP	20,178	9,094	45.07%	790	3.92%	37	0.18%	5,402	26.77%	26	0.13%	157	0.78%	1,043	5.17%	3,629	17.98%
La Crescenta-Montrose	CDP	19,997	10,461	52.31%	139	0.70%	26	0.13%	5,632	28.16%	12	0.06%	86	0.43%	933	4.67%	2,708	13.54%
South San Jose Hills	CDP	19,855	612	3.08%	162	0.82%	27	0.14%	2,332	11.75%	28	0.14%	64	0.32%	113	0.57%	16,517	83.19%
Hermosa Beach	City	19,728	14,563	73.82%	195	0.99%	31	0.16%	1,371	6.95%	20	0.10%	152	0.77%	1,332	6.75%	2,064	10.46%
South El Monte	City	19,567	448	2.29%	51	0.26%	23	0.12%	3,348	17.11%	0	0.00%	22	0.11%	90	0.46%	15,585	79.65%
Santa Fe Springs	City	19,219	1,896	9.87%	618	3.22%	40	0.21%	1,618	8.42%	46	0.24%	73	0.38%	302	1.57%	14,626	76.10%
Castaic	CDP	18,937	9,208	48.62%	600	3.17%	51	0.27%	2,036	10.75%	27	0.14%	151	0.80%	978	5.16%	5,886	31.08%
El Segundo	City	17,272	10,626	61.58%	394	2.28%	45	0.26%	1,804	10.44%	61	0.35%	88	0.51%	1,268	7.34%	2,976	17.23%
Artesia	City	16,395	2,608	15.91%	627	3.82%	26	0.16%	6,852	41.79%	58	0.35%	65	0.40%	334	2.04%	5,825	35.53%
Vincent	CDP	15,714	1,517	9.65%	227	1.44%	33	0.21%	1,774	11.29%	19	0.12%	66	0.42%	225	1.43%	11,853	75.43%
Walnut Park	CDP	15,214	214	1.41%	54	0.35%	2	0.01%	52	0.34%	2	0.01%	28	0.18%	45	0.30%	14,817	97.39%
East Rancho Dominguez	CDP	15,114	143	0.95%	1,841	12.18%	14	0.09%	32	0.21%	69	0.46%	58	0.38%	100	0.66%	12,857	85.07%
Hawaiian Gardens	City	14,149	773	5.46%	550	3.89%	18	0.13%	1,732	12.24%	35	0.25%	56	0.40%	127	0.90%	10,858	76.74%
Palos Verdes Estates	City	13,347	8,544	64.01%	166	1.24%	16	0.12%	2,713	20.33%	4	0.03%	85	0.64%	816	6.11%	1,003	7.51%
Avocado Heights	CDP	13,317	771	5.79%	80	0.60%	21	0.16%	1,608	12.07%	7	0.05%	63	0.47%	129	0.97%	10,638	79.88%
Lake Los Angeles	CDP	13,187	3,097	23.49%	945	7.17%	65	0.49%	76	0.58%	12	0.09%	105	0.80%	376	2.85%	8,511	64.54%
San Marino	City	12,513	3,469	27.72%	58	0.46%	4	0.03%	7,581	60.58%	7	0.06%	22	0.18%	484	3.87%	888	7.10%
Commerce	City	12,378	293	2.37%	88	0.71%	38	0.31%	163	1.32%	3	0.02%	44	0.36%	59	0.48%	11,690	94.44%
Sun Village	CDP	12,345	2,123	17.20%	536	4.34%	27	0.22%	73	0.59%	5	0.04%	45	0.36%	234	1.90%	9,302	75.35%
Signal Hill	City	11,848	2,831	23.89%	1,550	13.08%	33	0.28%	2,586	21.83%	80	0.68%	48	0.41%	512	4.32%	4,208	35.52%
Quartz Hill	CDP	11,447	5,637	49.24%	777	6.79%	40	0.35%	312	2.73%	17	0.15%	77	0.67%	599	5.23%	3,988	34.84%
View Park-Windsor Hills	CDP	11,419	1,004	8.79%	8,048	70.48%	9	0.08%	319	2.79%	10	0.09%	87	0.76%	844	7.39%	1,098	9.62%
Marina del Rey	CDP	11,373	8,099	71.21%	503	4.42%	10	0.09%	841	7.39%	17	0.15%	145	1.27%	637	5.60%	1,121	9.86%
Sierra Madre	City	11,268	7,046	62.53%	153	1.36%	20	0.18%	1,408	12.50%	10	0.09%	67	0.59%	641	5.69%	1,923	17.07%
Malibu	City	10,654	8,724	81.88%	137	1.29%	12	0.11%	339	3.18%	5	0.05%	79	0.74%	525	4.93%	833	7.82%
East Whittier	CDP	10,394	3,114	29.96%	181	1.74%	42	0.40%	726	6.98%	32	0.31%	69	0.66%	296	2.85%	5,934	57.09%
Del Aire	CDP	10,338	3,200	30.95%	484	4.68%	18	0.17%	1,058	10.23%	103	1.00%	79	0.76%	519	5.02%	4,877	47.18%
Citrus	CDP	10,243	1,183	11.55%	169	1.65%	36	0.35%	818	7.99%	6	0.06%	65	0.63%	160	1.56%	7,806	76.21%
Charter Oak	CDP	9,739	2,277	23.38%	379	3.89%	34	0.35%	1,113	11.43%	14	0.14%	44	0.45%	278	2.85%	5,600	57.50%
West Athens	CDP	9,393	144	1.53%	4,473	47.62%	24	0.26%	187	1.99%	28	0.30%	82	0.87%	234	2.49%	4,221	44.94%
Alondra Park	CDP	8,569	1,572	18.35%	926	10.81%	21	0.25%	1,410	16.45%	24	0.28%	80	0.93%	332	3.87%	4,204	49.06%
Topanga	CDP	8,560	6,656	77.76%	112	1.31%	24	0.28%	411	4.80%	6	0.07%	69	0.81%	523	6.11%	759	8.87%
Rolling Hills Estates	City	8,280	4,492	54.25%	90	1.09%	13	0.16%	2,492	30.10%	7	0.08%	71	0.86%	475	5.74%	640	7.73%
Westlake Village	City	8,029	6,248	77.82%	67	0.83%	6	0.07%	619	7.71%	4	0.05%	24	0.30%	410	5.11%	651	8.11%
South San Gabriel	CDP	7,920	362	4.57%	64	0.81%	6	0.08%	4,542	57.35%	7	0.09%	17	0.21%	76	0.96%	2,846	35.93%
Acton	CDP	7,431	4,736	63.73%	72	0.97%	33	0.44%	153	2.06%	11	0.15%	67	0.90%	283	3.81%	2,076	27.94%
Ladera Heights	CDP	6,654	1,014	15.24%	4,231	63.59%	14	0.21%	351	5.28%	2	0.03%	85	1.28%	451	6.78%	506	7.60%
South Monrovia Island	CDP	6,515	666	10.22%	390	5.99%	3	0.05%	733	11.25%	3	0.05%	35	0.54%	95	1.46%	4,590	70.45%
East Pasadena	CDP	6,021	1,502	24.95%	159	2.64%	7	0.12%	1,928	32.02%	12	0.20%	38	0.63%	201	3.34%	2,174	36.11%
La Habra Heights	City	5,682	2,421	42.61%	41	0.72%	10	0.18%	1,150	20.24%	5	0.09%	39	0.69%	203	3.57%	1,813	31.91%
Mayflower Village	CDP	5,402	1,469	27.19%	63	1.17%	9	0.17%	2,127	39.37%	1	0.02%	23	0.43%	203	3.76%	1,507	27.90%
North El Monte	CDP	3,730	793	21.26%	65	1.74%	5	0.13%	1,697	45.50%	0	0.00%	11	0.29%	80	2.14%	1,079	28.93%
Avalon	City	3,460	1,366	39.48%	29	0.84%	4	0.12%	29	0.84%	9	0.26%	11	0.32%	109	3.15%	1,903	55.00%
Agua Dulce	CDP	3,451	2,291	66.39%	46	1.33%	13	0.38%	59	1.71%	2	0.06%	21	0.61%	151	4.38%	868	25.15%
Rose Hills	CDP	2,927	614	20.98%	58	1.98%	8	0.27%	371	12.68%	2	0.07%	7	0.24%	66	2.25%	1,801	61.53%
Pepperdine University	CDP	2,747	1,626	59.19%	223	8.12%	70	2.55%	660	24.03%	6	0.22%	0	0.00%	26	0.95%	136	4.95%
Desert View Highlands	CDP	2,676	630	23.54%	163	6.09%	10	0.37%	115	4.30%	0	0.00%	12	0.45%	71	2.65%	1,675	62.59%
Val Verde	CDP	2,399	627	26.14%	68	2.83%	5	0.21%	62	2.58%	2	0.08%	18	0.75%	68	2.83%	1,549	64.57%
San Pasqual	CDP	2,101	987	46.98%	66	3.14%	1	0.05%	499	23.75%	0	0.00%	14	0.67%	105	5.00%	429	20.42%
Rolling Hills	City	1,739	1,128	64.86%	23	1.32%	2	0.12%	354	20.36%	1	0.06%	12	0.69%	97	5.58%	122	7.02%
Hidden Hills	City	1,725	1,393	80.75%	32	1.86%	3	0.17%	75	4.35%	0	0.00%	20	1.16%	85	4.93%	117	6.78%
Elizabeth Lake	CDP	1,651	1,166	70.62%	20	1.21%	9	0.55%	25	1.51%	0	0.00%	5	0.30%	87	5.27%	339	20.53%
Leona Valley	CDP	1,555	1,187	76.33%	8	0.51%	7	0.45%	19	1.22%	0	0.00%	19	1.22%	91	5.85%	224	14.41%
Littlerock	CDP	1,535	367	23.91%	76	4.95%	0	0.00%	24	1.56%	0	0.00%	12	0.78%	43	2.80%	1,013	65.99%
Irwindale	City	1,472	53	3.60%	15	1.02%	1	0.07%	50	3.40%	0	0.00%	2	0.14%	15	1.02%	1,336	90.76%
Hasley Canyon	CDP	1,195	746	62.43%	9	0.75%	2	0.17%	12	1.00%	1	0.08%	2	0.17%	56	4.69%	367	30.71%
Green Valley	CDP	1,036	763	73.65%	8	0.77%	5	0.48%	13	1.25%	2	0.19%	1	0.10%	61	5.89%	183	17.66%
Bradbury	City	921	335	36.37%	17	1.85%	1	0.11%	350	38.00%	0	0.00%	4	0.43%	30	3.26%	184	19.98%
Lake Hughes	CDP	544	384	70.59%	2	0.37%	0	0.00%	8	1.47%	1	0.18%	4	0.74%	19	3.49%	126	23.16%
Industry	City	264	82	31.06%	8	3.03%	0	0.00%	33	12.50%	0	0.00%	2	0.76%	9	3.41%	130	49.24%
Vernon	City	222	14	6.31%	18	8.11%	0	0.00%	14	6.31%	0	0.00%	7	3.15%	1	0.45%	168	75.68%

=== 2024 American Community Survey ===
Racial Makeup of Los Angeles County (2024): 1. White alone (30.0%); 2. Black alone (7.61%); 3. Native American alone (1.60%); 4. Asian alone (15.4%); 5. Pacific Islander alone (0.27%); 6. Other race (25.1%); 7. Two or more races (20.0%)	Racial Makeup of Los Angeles County treating Hispanics as a Racial Category (2024); NH=Non-Hispanic: 1. White NH (24.2%); 2. Black NH (7.33%); 3. Native American NH (0.16%); 4. Asian NH (15.1%); 5. Pacific Islander NH (0.23%); 6. Other race NH (0.55%); 7. Two or more races NH (3.67%); 8. Hispanic Any Race (48.8%)	Racial Makeup of Hispanics in Los Angeles County (2024): 1. White alone (11.8%); 2. Black alone (0.56%); 3. Native American alone (2.96%); 4. Asian alone (0.58%); 5. Pacific Islander alone (0.08%); 6. Other race alone (50.4%); 7. Two or more races (33.6%)

According to the 2024 US Census Bureau estimates, Los Angeles County's population was 30.0% White, 7.6% Black or African American, 1.6% Native American and Alaskan Native,15.4% Asian, 0.3% Pacific Islander, 25.1% Other Race, and 20.0 from two or more races. The White population continues to remain the largest racial category as many Hispanics in Los Angeles County identify as White (11.8%) with others identifying as Other Race (50.4%), Multiracial (33.6%), Black (0.6%), American Indian and Alaskan Native (3.0%), Asian (0.6%), and Hawaiian and Pacific Islander (0.1%). By ethnicity, 48.8% of the total population is Hispanic-Latino (of any race) and 51.2% is Non-Hispanic (of any race).

If Latinos were excluded from the racial categories and treated as if they were a separate group, Los Angeles County's 2024 population would be 48.8% Latino, 24.2% White Non-Hispanic, 7.3% Black or African American, 15.1% Asian, 0.2% Native American and Alaskan Native, 0.2% Pacific Islander, 0.6% Other Race, and 3.7% from two or more races.

=== 2000 ===
As of the census of 2000, there were 9,519,338 people, 3,133,774 households, and 2,137,233 families residing in the county. The population density was 2,344 people per square mile (905 people/km^{2}). There were 3,270,909 housing units at an average density of 806 per square mile (311/km^{2}). The racial makeup of the county is 48.7% White 11.0% African American, 0.8% Native American, 10.0% Asian, 0.3% Pacific Islander, 23.5% from other races, and 4.9% from two or more races. 44.6% of the population are Hispanic or Latino of any race. The largest European-American ancestry groups are German (6%), Irish (5%), English (4%) and Italian (3%). 45.9% of the population reported speaking only English at home; 37.9% spoke Spanish, 2.22% Tagalog, 2.0% Chinese, 1.9% Korean, and 1.87% Armenian.

Because the county is so populous, what is not so evident is that it has the largest Native American population of any county in the nation: according to the 2000 census, it has more than 153,550 people of indigenous descent, and most are from Latin America. "The invisible population that is virtually ignored by the census is that of indigenous people from Mexico, Central and South America." In addition, there are Cherokee and other Native Americans from the US, and Pacific Islanders like Native Hawaiians from Hawaii, Samoa and other Pacific Islands.

There were 3,133,774 households, out of which 36.80% had children under the age of 18 living with them, 47.6% were married couples living together, 14.7% had a female householder with no husband present, and 31.8% were non-families. 24.6% of all households were made up of individuals, and 7.1% had someone living alone who was 65 years of age or older. The average household size was 2.98 and the average family size was 3.61.

In the county, the population was spread out, with 28.0% under the age of 18, 10.3% from 18 to 24, 32.6% from 25 to 44, 19.4% from 45 to 64, and 9.7% who were 65 years of age or older. The median age was 32 years. For every 100 females there were 97.7 males. For every 100 females age 18 and over, there were 95.0 males.

The median income for a household in the county was $42,189, and the median income for a family was $46,452. Males had a median income of $36,299 versus $30,981 for females. The per capita income for the county was $20,683. There are 14.4% of families living below the poverty line and 17.9% of the population, including 24.2% of under 18 and 10.5% of those over 64.

According to TNS Financial Services, Los Angeles County has the highest number of millionaires of any county in the nation, totaling 261,081 households as of 2007. In addition to millionaires, Los Angeles County has the largest number of homeless people, with "48,000 people living on the streets, including 6,000 veterans."

== Ethnic groups ==
=== Mexican Americans ===
As of 2020, Los Angeles county has the largest population of people of full or partial Mexican descent in the United States. Per the 2024 American Community Survey, the Mexican American population was 3,404,052 comprising 34.9% of the population of the county and 71.5% of the Latino population in the county.

== Tables for places within Los Angeles County ==
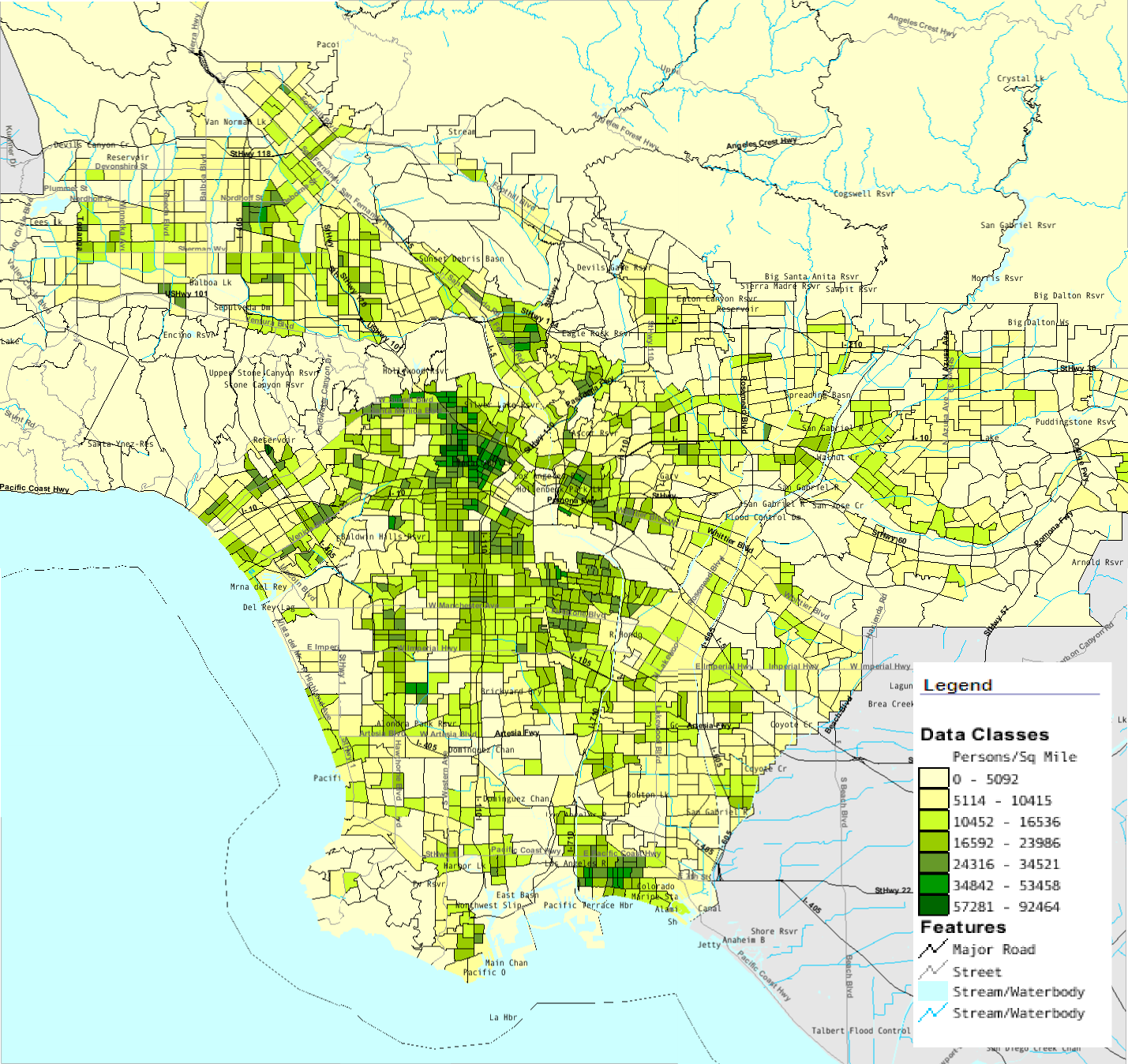
Map of Los Angeles County showing population density in 2000 by census tract

Places by population and income
Place	Type	Population	Per capita income	Median household income	Median family income
Acton	CDP	7,138	$33,279	$87,896	$94,673
Agoura Hills	City	20,353	$53,193	$108,820	$129,648
Agua Dulce	CDP	2,991	$39,064	$97,000	$105,833
Alhambra	City	83,301	$24,849	$52,717	$56,062
Alondra Park	CDP	8,358	$23,742	$58,906	$57,784
Altadena	CDP	45,006	$40,659	$84,413	$90,308
Arcadia	City	55,993	$38,518	$77,221	$93,977
Artesia	City	16,495	$21,366	$58,281	$60,260
Avalon	City	3,690	$24,296	$49,514	$64,087
Avocado Heights	CDP	15,378	$21,737	$73,030	$77,019
Azusa	City	46,177	$19,119	$53,826	$57,778
Baldwin Park	City	75,441	$15,534	$52,094	$51,948
Bell	City	35,602	$12,436	$37,121	$36,713
Bellflower	City	76,243	$20,591	$50,244	$55,575
Bell Gardens	City	42,294	$12,026	$38,971	$39,190
Beverly Hills	City	34,042	$75,234	$85,560	$114,764
Bradbury	City	932	$67,880	$118,750	$152,727
Burbank	City	103,037	$33,651	$66,024	$78,802
Calabasas	City	22,839	$67,123	$118,182	$135,889
Carson	City	91,508	$24,026	$70,416	$74,869
Castaic	CDP	18,170	$36,053	$100,625	$106,200
Cerritos	City	49,281	$32,610	$87,853	$95,282
Charter Oak	CDP	9,747	$24,462	$67,423	$74,340
Citrus	CDP	10,441	$19,953	$67,382	$66,603
Claremont	City	34,824	$37,539	$81,715	$104,608
Commerce	City	12,791	$17,116	$48,878	$53,246
Compton	City	96,102	$13,595	$43,311	$44,835
Covina	City	47,662	$26,055	$67,638	$74,726
Cudahy	City	23,846	$12,034	$39,338	$37,920
Culver City	City	38,899	$42,832	$75,596	$96,809
Del Aire	CDP	9,791	$30,570	$83,705	$95,136
Desert View Highlands	CDP	2,431	$16,860	$62,591	$64,783
Diamond Bar	City	55,668	$35,771	$90,153	$98,506
Downey	City	111,329	$23,241	$59,773	$63,263
Duarte	City	21,363	$25,717	$64,329	$70,068
East Los Angeles	CDP	124,222	$12,628	$37,271	$39,136
East Pasadena	CDP	5,774	$42,048	$74,127	$79,688
East Rancho Dominguez	CDP	13,891	$12,761	$50,114	$50,538
East San Gabriel	CDP	15,453	$32,592	$70,250	$85,561
East Whittier	CDP	10,195	$26,741	$65,926	$85,069
Elizabeth Lake	CDP	1,462	$36,838	$96,016	$98,112
El Monte	City	113,763	$14,464	$41,820	$43,183
El Segundo	City	16,597	$46,185	$88,486	$103,890
Florence-Graham	CDP	61,333	$11,745	$38,329	$37,099
Gardena	City	58,743	$22,969	$46,961	$55,227
Glendale	City	192,069	$30,107	$54,087	$61,283
Glendora	City	50,000	$32,851	$75,939	$85,104
Green Valley	CDP	1,113	$38,333	$89,615	$106,250
Hacienda Heights	CDP	55,684	$28,376	$72,759	$79,390
Hasley Canyon	CDP	1,301	$44,449	$92,143	$95,000
Hawaiian Gardens	City	14,309	$14,066	$42,898	$44,821
Hawthorne	City	84,293	$19,862	$45,622	$50,490
Hermosa Beach	City	19,422	$69,857	$102,289	$156,506
Hidden Hills	City	2,370	$119,367	$250,001	$250,001
Huntington Park	City	58,465	$12,461	$36,788	$37,573
Industry	City	518	$13,782	$49,792	$48,958
Inglewood	City	109,967	$20,187	$44,021	$47,697
Irwindale	City	1,525	$19,158	$65,455	$65,260
La Cañada Flintridge	City	20,248	$74,357	$148,214	$168,813
La Crescenta-Montrose	CDP	19,785	$38,009	$83,048	$99,688
Ladera Heights	CDP	6,624	$56,603	$97,518	$108,914
La Habra Heights	City	5,304	$53,945	$127,750	$157,589
Lake Hughes	CDP	680	$24,742	$52,823	$64,318
Lake Los Angeles	CDP	12,053	$16,034	$44,565	$46,045
Lakewood	City	79,994	$29,838	$78,360	$86,039
La Mirada	City	48,363	$28,468	$81,913	$89,677
Lancaster	City	152,678	$20,739	$52,290	$57,448
La Puente	City	39,957	$15,762	$52,042	$54,040
La Verne	City	31,139	$32,335	$77,088	$89,824
Lawndale	City	32,652	$18,895	$48,813	$52,093
Lennox	CDP	22,303	$11,453	$36,493	$36,122
Leona Valley	CDP	1,981	$32,172	$79,659	$93,011
Littlerock	CDP	1,237	$18,518	$50,982	$53,438
Lomita	City	20,246	$29,251	$61,327	$72,933
Long Beach	City	462,197	$26,986	$52,945	$60,179
Los Angeles	City	3,782,544	$28,222	$50,028	$54,243
Lynwood	City	69,818	$12,443	$43,782	$43,856
Malibu	City	12,746	$99,692	$132,926	$155,082
Manhattan Beach	City	34,986	$81,472	$132,752	$178,783
Marina del Rey	CDP	8,840	$70,228	$91,218	$107,679
Mayflower Village	CDP	5,673	$29,024	$75,982	$79,400
Maywood	City	27,454	$12,210	$38,155	$39,204
Monrovia	City	36,622	$32,084	$68,071	$77,073
Montebello	City	62,470	$21,253	$52,496	$57,094
Monterey Park	City	60,251	$23,639	$51,736	$58,973
North El Monte	CDP	4,075	$26,805	$65,380	$82,614
Norwalk	City	105,348	$19,379	$60,090	$62,761
Palmdale	City	149,001	$19,193	$55,213	$55,460
Palos Verdes Estates	City	13,412	$92,920	$159,038	$186,651
Paramount	City	54,196	$14,293	$42,831	$44,017
Pasadena	City	136,807	$39,825	$67,920	$81,498
Pico Rivera	City	63,004	$18,428	$55,632	$61,607
Pomona	City	148,946	$17,113	$50,893	$53,297
Quartz Hill	CDP	10,845	$23,057	$56,070	$65,464
Rancho Palos Verdes	City	41,575	$58,045	$116,643	$132,492
Redondo Beach	City	66,397	$51,703	$94,982	$118,658
Rolling Hills	City	1,790	$128,300	$223,750	$246,591
Rolling Hills Estates	City	8,040	$75,293	$151,757	$163,466
Rose Hills	CDP	2,977	$46,965	$91,979	$120,074
Rosemead	City	53,725	$17,869	$47,964	$51,702
Rowland Heights	CDP	50,663	$26,030	$63,750	$66,383
San Dimas	City	33,523	$33,731	$74,610	$84,409
San Fernando	City	23,638	$16,211	$52,021	$54,667
San Gabriel	City	39,703	$25,432	$57,666	$61,491
San Marino	City	13,131	$78,155	$154,318	$164,643
San Pasqual	CDP	2,111	$55,093	$94,875	$104,306
Santa Clarita	City	173,993	$33,322	$83,579	$92,521
Santa Fe Springs	City	16,333	$18,675	$53,638	$61,823
Santa Monica	City	89,153	$58,933	$71,400	$107,660
Sierra Madre	City	10,881	$52,221	$84,487	$115,329
Signal Hill	City	10,842	$34,215	$69,946	$72,891
South El Monte	City	20,197	$14,013	$47,537	$45,858
South Gate	City	94,586	$14,039	$41,990	$44,007
South Monrovia Island	CDP	6,043	$16,560	$53,883	$56,149
South Pasadena	City	25,465	$50,185	$84,914	$103,970
South San Gabriel	CDP	7,872	$22,967	$62,500	$66,969
South San Jose Hills	CDP	20,442	$13,365	$55,033	$56,376
South Whittier	CDP	58,012	$20,532	$64,824	$67,061
Stevenson Ranch	CDP	17,116	$47,877	$114,036	$130,036
Sun Village	CDP	11,165	$17,232	$54,481	$58,078
Temple City	City	35,372	$26,779	$65,445	$72,675
Topanga	CDP	9,065	$66,493	$127,167	$147,188
Torrance	City	144,622	$36,370	$75,885	$91,028
Valinda	CDP	22,326	$17,590	$66,013	$63,629
Val Verde	CDP	2,325	$19,197	$59,506	$70,714
Vernon	City	64	$22,756	$32,292	$59,375
View Park-Windsor Hills	CDP	10,814	$46,145	$78,729	$105,511
Vincent	CDP	16,736	$19,429	$71,189	$69,925
Walnut	City	29,269	$34,045	$101,358	$106,284
Walnut Park	CDP	16,272	$11,731	$38,538	$34,621
West Athens	CDP	8,431	$19,502	$47,773	$51,671
West Carson	CDP	20,641	$28,795	$63,125	$75,850
West Covina	City	105,810	$26,006	$68,308	$75,610
West Hollywood	City	34,564	$53,227	$52,303	$63,725
Westlake Village	City	8,276	$66,429	$113,852	$136,150
Westmont	CDP	30,915	$14,646	$31,826	$37,403
West Puente Valley	CDP	22,485	$16,591	$60,393	$64,060
West Rancho Dominguez	CDP	5,474	$17,295	$39,696	$54,375
West Whittier-Los Nietos	CDP	25,358	$19,796	$59,356	$61,952
Whittier	City	85,161	$28,031	$68,055	$73,744
Willowbrook	CDP	34,322	$13,814	$37,632	$40,162
