= Wilsona School District =

Los Angeles, California-area school district

Location
- Los Angeles County, surrounding areas California United States

District information
- Type: Public
- Grades: Pre K-8th Grade
- Established: 1915; 110 years ago
- Superintendent: Steve Doyle
- Schools: 4

Students and staff
- Students: 1,250
- Teachers: 65

Other information
- Website: www.wilsonasd.net

The Wilsona School District is a school district that serves most of the rural community of Lake Los Angeles, California, United States, and its surrounding areas. It neighbors Keppel Union School District which also serves part of the community of Lake Los Angeles to the south.

The Wilsona School District has approximately 1,250 students enrolled in four schools:

- 2 elementary schools
- 1 junior high school

The Wilsona School District serves transitional kindergarten through the eighth grade. All high school level education (ninth to twelfth grades) in the metropolitan area is provided by the Antelope Valley Union High School District.

== SBCC Grand Opening at Wilsona Center ==
On September 27, 2023, Strength Based Community Change's (SBCC) The Center at Wilsona celebrated their official grand opening of their resources center. Located on the southeast corner of the Wilsona Elementary School's campus (Avenue M-8 and 170th Street East), SBCC is a community based organization that has been bringing resources into Lake Los Angeles for the families of our community for many years now. Their current facility has been open on the Wilsona School campus since the Wilsona School District Board of Trustees approved their grant in 2020-2021 school year, but they also assist families of the Keppel Union School District (also in Lake Los Angeles to the south) as well. Their resources include assisting families with applying to Cal-Fresh or medical programs and so much more. "We give one-on-one support for these programs, but time slots are limited," Erika Schwerdt, Director of Strength Based Community Change at The Center at Wilsona.

== List of Schools ==
=== Elementary Schools ===
- Wilsona Elementary School (third to fifth grade)
- Vista San Gabriel Elementary School (TK to second grade)

Wilsona Elementary School opened in 1915. It served kindergarten through eighth grade before Challenger Middle School was built in the late 1980s. Wilsona later closed, but reopened years later to serve pre K partnered with Palmdale School District and fifth grade from Challenger. As of the 2021–2022 school year (starting August 10, 2021), Wilsona Elementary School expanded to include fifth grade.

Vista San Gabriel Elementary School opened in 1990. As of the 2021-2022 school year (starting August 10, 2021), Vista San Gabriel currently serves Transitional Kindergarten (TK) to fourth grade. A new kindergarten building opened the same school year due to the new funding from the WE Bond in 2018 and approved by the community voters. All five trustee members approved the WE Bond during the 2017-2018 school year which was voted in by the voters of the community of Lake Los Angeles within the Wilsona School District boundaries (at least 67% or 2/3 vote to approve the WE Bond in November of 2018). It also paid for the new perimeter fencing that currently stands at Vista San Gabriel, Wilsona Elementary, and Challenger Middle School as well. At the time, Wilsona ES housed Pre K, fifth grade, and sixth grade while Vista San Gabriel ES housed TK through fourth grade.

As of the 2024-2025 school year, Wilsona Elementary School officially reopened under its original name, housing third grade through fifth grade for the first time since it closed. Upon Wilsona ES's reopening, Joan Hammond was named administrator after she taught at Vista San Gabriel Elementary School. Vista San Gabriel Elementary School downsized its grade levels (from TK to fourth grade) to TK through second grade. Challenger Middle School gained the sixth grade back from Wilsona ES like when it first opened (sixth through eighth grade).

=== Junior High School ===
- Challenger Middle School (sixth to eighth grade)

Challenger Middle School was built in 1987 to 1988, opening in the 1988–1989 school year. Challenger added fifth grade to its campus when Wilsona Elementary School closed. As of the 2021–2022 school year, Challenger serves sixth grade to eighth grade.

== See also ==
- List of school districts in California
- Palmdale School District
- Eastside Union School District
- Keppel Union School District
- Lancaster School District
- Westside Union School District
- Antelope Valley Union High School District
