= Desert View Highlands, California =

- Unincorporated community Census designated place
- Location of Desert View Highlands in Los Angeles County, California.

- Location in the United States
- Coordinates: 34°35′23″N 118°9′13″W
- Country: United States
- State: California
- County: Los Angeles

Area
  - Total: 0.44 sq mi (1.14 km^{2})
  - Land: 0.44 sq mi (1.14 km^{2})
  - Water: 0 sq mi (0.00 km^{2}) 0%
- Elevation: 2,713 ft (827 m)

Population (2020)
  - Total: 2,676
  - Density: 6,068.0/sq mi (2,342.87/km^{2})
- Time zone: UTC-8 (Pacific)
  - Summer (DST): UTC-7 (PDT)
- ZIP code: 93551
- Area code: 661
- FIPS code: 06-19052
- GNIS feature ID: 1733577

Desert View Highlands is an unincorporated community and census designated place (CDP) in Los Angeles County, California, United States. The population was 2,676 at the 2020 census, up from 2,360 at the 2010 census. It is surrounded by the City of Palmdale.

== Geography ==
According to the United States Census Bureau, the CDP has a total area of 0.4 square miles (1.0 km^{2}), all land.

== Demographics ==
Historical population
Census	Pop.	Note	%±
1970	2,172		—
1980	2,175		0.1%
1990	2,154		−1.0%
2000	2,337		8.5%
2010	2,360		1.0%
2020	2,676		13.4%
U.S. Decennial Census; 1860–1870 1880-1890; 1900 1910 1920; 1930 1940 1950; 1960 1970 1980; 1990 2000 2010; 2020

Desert View Highland first appeared as a census designated place in the 1970 U.S. census.

=== Racial and ethnic composition ===
Desert View Highlands CDP, California – Racial and ethnic composition Note: the US Census treats Hispanic/Latino as an ethnic category. This table excludes Latinos from the racial categories and assigns them to a separate category. Hispanics/Latinos may be of any race.
Race / Ethnicity (NH = Non-Hispanic)	Pop 1990	Pop 2000	Pop 2010	Pop 2020	% 1990	% 2000	% 2010	% 2020
White alone (NH)	1,615	1,207	787	630	74.98%	51.65%	33.35%	23.54%
Black or African American alone (NH)	56	130	175	163	2.60%	5.56%	7.42%	6.09%
Native American or Alaska Native alone (NH)	26	12	19	10	1.21%	0.51%	0.81%	0.37%
Asian alone (NH)	44	50	48	115	2.04%	2.14%	2.03%	4.30%
Native Hawaiian or Pacific Islander alone (NH)	44	2	1	0	2.04%	0.09%	0.04%	0.00%
Other race alone (NH)	5	2	15	12	0.23%	0.09%	0.64%	0.45%
Mixed race or Multiracial (NH)	x	74	62	71	x	3.17%	2.63%	2.65%
Hispanic or Latino (any race)	408	860	1,253	1,675	18.94%	36.80%	53.09%	62.59%
Total	2,154	2,337	2,360	2,676	100.00%	100.00%	100.00%	100.00%

=== 2020 census ===
As of the 2020 census, Desert View Highlands had a population of 2,676 and a population density of 6,068.0 inhabitants per square mile (2,342.9/km^{2}). 100.0% of residents lived in urban areas, while 0.0% lived in rural areas.

The whole population lived in households. There were 809 households, out of which 43.5% included children under the age of 18, 47.0% were married-couple households, 7.9% were cohabiting couple households, 27.1% had a female householder with no spouse or partner present, and 18.0% had a male householder with no spouse or partner present. 16.4% of households were one person, and 7.5% were one person aged 65 or older. The average household size was 3.31. There were 633 families (78.2% of all households).

The age distribution was 25.3% under the age of 18, 10.2% aged 18 to 24, 26.7% aged 25 to 44, 25.2% aged 45 to 64, and 12.6% who were 65 years of age or older. The median age was 34.5 years. For every 100 females, there were 95.6 males, and for every 100 females age 18 and over, there were 93.8 males age 18 and over.

There were 832 housing units at an average density of 1,886.6 units per square mile (728.4 units/km^{2}), of which 809 (97.2%) were occupied. Of these, 67.0% were owner-occupied, and 33.0% were occupied by renters. The homeowner vacancy rate was 0.9% and the rental vacancy rate was 3.9%.

=== 2010 census ===
At the 2010 census Desert View Highlands had a population of 2,360. The population density was 5,364.0 inhabitants per square mile (2,071.1/km^{2}). The racial makeup of Desert View Highlands was 1,286 (54.5%) White (33.3% Non-Hispanic White), 182 (7.7%) African American, 29 (1.2%) Native American, 50 (2.1%) Asian, 1 (0.0%) Pacific Islander, 669 (28.3%) from other races, and 143 (6.1%) from two or more races. Hispanic or Latino of any race were 1,253 persons (53.1%).

The census reported that 2,353 people (99.7% of the population) lived in households, 7 (0.3%) lived in non-institutionalized group quarters, and no one was institutionalized.

There were 678 households, 350 (51.6%) had children under the age of 18 living in them, 342 (50.4%) were opposite-sex married couples living together, 135 (19.9%) had a female householder with no husband present, 57 (8.4%) had a male householder with no wife present. There were 55 (8.1%) unmarried opposite-sex partnerships, and 5 (0.7%) same-sex married couples or partnerships. 109 households (16.1%) were one person and 37 (5.5%) had someone living alone who was 65 or older. The average household size was 3.47. There were 534 families (78.8% of households); the average family size was 3.82.

The age distribution was 746 people (31.6%) under the age of 18, 271 people (11.5%) aged 18 to 24, 590 people (25.0%) aged 25 to 44, 548 people (23.2%) aged 45 to 64, and 205 people (8.7%) who were 65 or older. The median age was 31.1 years. For every 100 females, there were 99.2 males. For every 100 females age 18 and over, there were 94.7 males.

There were 764 housing units at an average density of 1,736.5 per square mile, of the occupied units 443 (65.3%) were owner-occupied and 235 (34.7%) were rented. The homeowner vacancy rate was 4.1%; the rental vacancy rate was 10.3%. 1,417 people (60.0% of the population) lived in owner-occupied housing units and 936 people (39.7%) lived in rental housing units.

According to the 2010 United States Census, Desert View Highlands had a median household income of $63,717, with 22.1% of the population living below the federal poverty line.

== Government ==
In the California State Legislature, Desert View Highlands is in the 23rd senatorial district, represented by Republican Suzette Martinez Valladares, and in the 34th Assembly district, represented by Republican Tom Lackey.

In the United States House of Representatives, Desert View Highlands is in California's 27th congressional district, represented by Democrat George T. Whitesides.

== Education ==
The CDP is served by the Palmdale Elementary School District and by the Antelope Valley Union Joint High School District.
