= Drennan v. Star Paving Co. =

Drennan v. Star Paving Company
- Supreme Court of California

Decided Dec 31, 1958
- Full case name: William A. Drennan, respondent, v. Star Paving Company (a Corporation), Appellant
- Citation(s): 51 Cal. 2d 409 (1958)

Case history
- Prior history: Defendant appealed a judgment for plaintiff in a contracts action
- Subsequent history: none

Holding
- Judgment affirmed for plaintiff.

Court membership
- Chief Justice: Phil S. Gibson
- Associate Justices: John W. Shenk, Roger J. Traynor, B. Rey Schauer, Homer R. Spence Marshall F. McComb

Case opinions
- Majority: Traynor, joined by Shenk, Gibson, Schauer, Spence, McComb

Drennan v. Star Paving Company, 51 Cal. 2d 409 (1958), was a California Supreme Court case in which the court held that a party who has detrimentally relied on an offer that is revoked prior to acceptance may assert promissory estoppel to recover damages.

== Background ==
William A. Drennan, a general contractor, had gotten a bid from Star Paving, a subcontractor for a construction job and had included Star Paving's bid number in his total bid. Drennan won the contract to build the Monte Vista Elementary School for the Lancaster School District based on that bid. Subsequently, Star Paving contacted him to say that its initial bid had been approximately $7000 short, and that it would not be able to complete the project for the amount of money it had previously specified. After finding an alternative subcontractor to complete the job, Drennan sued Star Paving for the difference between its bid and the cost.

== Opinion of the Court ==
Judge Roger J. Traynor, writing for the California Supreme Court, held that the plaintiff's reliance on defendant's bid, as well as defendant's failure to indicate that the bid was revocable before acceptance, meant that defendant was responsible for providing the service at the price initially specified.

== Impact ==
In contracts courses this case is often contrasted with James Baird Co. v. Gimbel Bros., a 1933 case with similar facts from the Second Circuit decided by Judge Learned Hand. Hand held that an offeror was free to revoke the offer prior to acceptance; twenty-five years later, when the doctrine of promissory estoppel had found wider acceptance, Traynor held that the offer was irrevocable once the offeree had relied upon it.
