= Justin Tryon =

American football player (born 1984)

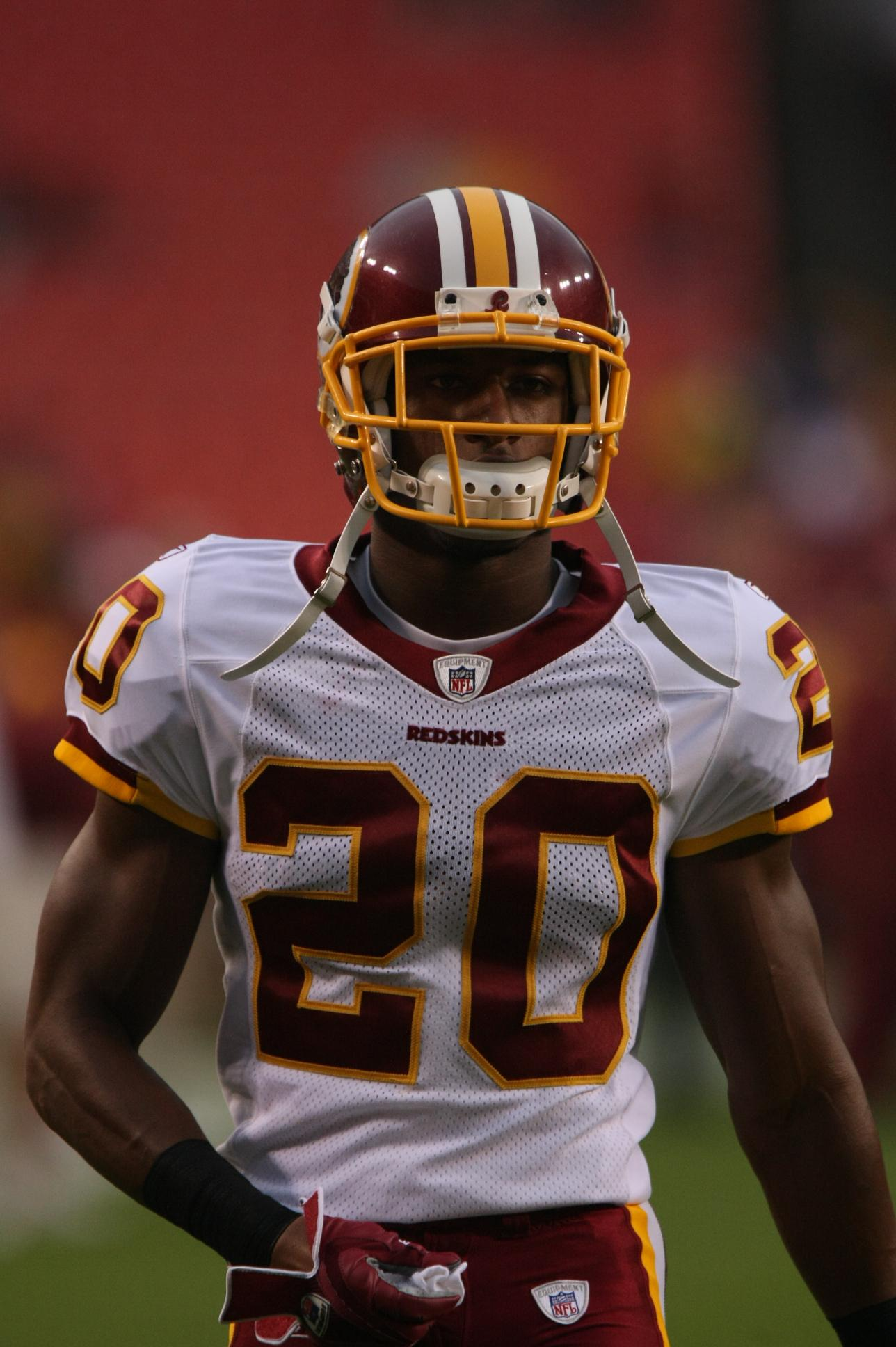
- Tryon with the Washington Redskins in 2009

No. 20, 30
- Position: Cornerback

Personal information
- Born: May 29, 1984 (age 42); Northridge, California, U.S.
- Listed height: 5 ft 9 in (1.75 m)
- Listed weight: 183 lb (83 kg)

Career information
- High school: William Howard Taft (Woodland Hills, California)
- College: Arizona State
- NFL draft: 2008: 4th round, 124th overall pick

Career history
- Washington Redskins (2008–2009); Indianapolis Colts (2010–2011); New York Giants (2011–2012)

Awards and highlights
- Super Bowl champion (XLVI); Second-team All-Pac-10 (2007)

Career NFL statistics
- Total tackles: 102
- Sacks: 1
- Fumble recoveries: 2
- Interceptions: 1
- Stats at Pro Football Reference

Justin Deaon Tryon (born May 29, 1984) is an American former professional football player who was a cornerback in the National Football League (NFL). He played college football for the Arizona State Sun Devils and was selected by the Washington Redskins in the fourth round of the 2008 NFL draft. He also played for the Indianapolis Colts and New York Giants.

== Early life ==
Tryon was born Northridge, California. He played for Littlerock High School and graduated from William Howard Taft High School (Los Angeles). He played college football at Arizona State University and College of the Canyons. Justin started all 26 games during his two seasons at ASU. Earned Second-team All-Conference honors as a senior after being named honorable mention All-Pac 10 as a junior. Won junior college national championship game in 2005.

== Professional career ==
=== Washington Redskins ===
On June 13, 2008, Tryon officially signed a three-year contract with the Redskins. He had 26 tackles and one interception during the season.

=== Indianapolis Colts ===
On September 4, 2010, he was traded from the Redskins to the Indianapolis Colts for an undisclosed draft pick. Tryon had an interception during a 2010 wild card matchup against the Jets before the half. The Colts lost the game on a late field goal, 17–16. He was released by the Colts on September 28, 2011.

=== New York Giants ===
He signed with the New York Giants on October 4, 2011. He played for the Giants for both the 2011 and 2012 seasons.
