= SOAR High School =

Students On Academic Rise (SOAR) High School

Location
- 3041 West Avenue K Lancaster, California 93536; United States; 34°40′33″N 118°11′08″W

Information
- Type: Public
- Motto: Dream high and SOAR higher!
- Established: 2006; 20 years ago
- School district: Antelope Valley Union High School District
- NCES School ID: 060282011610
- Principal: Dr. Krishna Spates
- Faculty: 14.05 (on FTE basis)
- Grades: 9 to 12
- Enrollment: 427 (2018–19)
- Student to teacher ratio: 30.39
- Colors: Maroon and Silver
- Mascot: Star
- Nickname: SOAR Stars
- Website: www.soarhs.org

Students On Academic Rise (SOAR) High School is an early college high school in Lancaster, California. The high school is a joint project of the Antelope Valley Union High School District and Antelope Valley College. SOAR stands for Students on Academic Rise. The school was founded in 2006. SOAR integrates the Advancement Via Individual Determination (AVID) college-preparatory program as a mandatory elective course for all grade levels. Throughout its history, the school has been served by five principals: Michael Dutton, Chris Grado, Stephanie Herrera, Wendy Johnston, and Krishna Spates.

Two SOAR High School students represented SOAR's InvenTeam at the 2015 White House Science Fair.

Interested students must apply for the program by the annual February deadline, which can be found on the school's website. Applicants are to submit a video interview, and the admissions decisions will be announced sometime in late spring.

In 2022, SOAR opened a second campus on Antelope Valley College's Palmdale Center. The inaugural class of 57 students graduated in 2026.

== Academics ==
SOAR has very high standards for the academics of students, as a 3.0 GPA is recommended, and C's and above are the only acceptable grades if one wishes to remain at SOAR. However, there have been instances where counselors have allowed students to retake classes if need be. The unweighted GPA is what the school looks at when deciding whether or not a student is eligible to take more than one college class. It is recommended that a student only scores B's and A's on final class grades, as C's will lead to the student falling behind the curve.
