= Littlerock High School =

Coordinates: 34.57452°N 117.93763°W

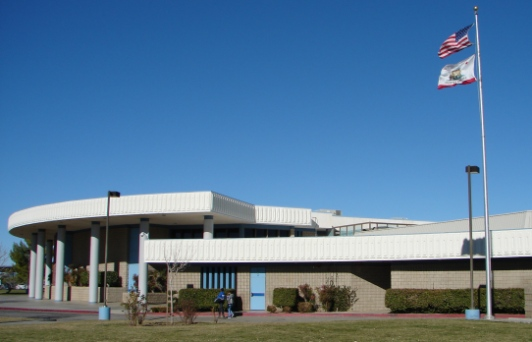

Location
- 10833 E. Avenue R Littlerock, California 93543

Information
- Type: High school
- Established: 1989
- School district: Antelope Valley Union High School District
- Principal: Jose Barajas
- Teaching staff: 62.01 (FTE)
- Grades: 9-12
- Enrollment: 1,565 (2022–23)
- Student to teacher ratio: 25.24
- Color
- Mascot: Lobo
- Website: Littlerock High School website

Littlerock High School is a public, co-educational high school built in 1989. It is located in Littlerock, California, United States. The school serves Littlerock and the surrounding communities of Lake Los Angeles, Pearblossom, and Llano. It is part of the Antelope Valley Union High School District (AVHSD).

Littlerock High School is designated as a Title I school.

== Notable alumni ==
- Justin Gocke, former child actor
- Justin Tryon, NFL player
- Delwyn Young, Major League Baseball player (Los Angeles Dodgers and Pittsburgh Pirates)
- Aaron Meeks, former child star
