= Sun Village, California =

Coordinates: 34°33′34″N 117°57′24″W

Sun Village
- Unincorporated community Census-designated place
- Interactive map of Sun Village
- Location in California Location in the United States
- Country: United States
- State: California
- County: Los Angeles

Area
  - Total: 10.804 sq mi (27.982 km^{2})
  - Land: 10.804 sq mi (27.982 km^{2})
  - Water: 0.00039 sq mi (0.001 km^{2}) 0%
- Elevation: 2,723 ft (830 m)

Population (2020)
  - Total: 12,345
  - Density: 1,142.6/sq mi (441.18/km^{2})
- Time zone: UTC-8 (Pacific (PST))
  - Summer (DST): UTC-7 (PDT)
- ZIP Code: 93543
- Area code: 661
- GNIS feature ID: 2583157
- FIPS code: 06-77308

Sun Village is an unincorporated community and census-designated place (CDP) in Los Angeles County, California, United States. It is in the eastern Antelope Valley at an elevation of 2,723 feet (830 m). The center of Sun Village may be considered to be Palmdale Boulevard and 87th Street East as noted at the Los Angeles County Assessors office. As of the 2020 census the population of Sun Village was 12,345, up from 11,565 at the 2010 census.

Sun Village has been awarded federal, state, and county grants for the community based on this Avenue U boundary. There is a movement from the Sun Village Town Council to rebrand the area with the Sun Village name, which fell out of popularity in the early 1980s. New road signage erected around 2011 now labels Sun Village as a unique community.

In 2007, the Sun Village and Littlerock town councils formed a Community Standard District together, and it was approved by the Los Angeles County Board of Supervisors.

On September 3, 2014, officials from Sun Village and the city of Palmdale gathered at the Palmdale City Council Chamber to sign a Memorandum of Understanding (MOU) in which Palmdale removed its sphere of influence from Sun Village.

Sun Village residents, as in many other Antelope Valley communities, take part in local pageants and parades. The community operates its own local chamber of commerce and town council.

== History ==
Sun Village was originally named Western Mojave Desert by the Native Americans. In the 1930's the Afroamerican Melvin Ray Grubbs moved to this area and established the first black community in the Antelope Valley. In 1939 he bought 1000 acres of land east of Palmdale. The first baptist church was opened in 1950. In 1965 the Jackie Robinson Park was opened.

== Geography ==
According to the United States Census Bureau, the CDP has a total area of 10.8 square miles (28.0 km^{2}), of which 0.30 acres (1,222 m^{2}) were listed as water.

== Demographics ==
Historical population
Census	Pop.	Note	%±
2010	11,565		—
2020	12,345		6.7%
U.S. Decennial Census; 1860–1870 1880-1890; 1900 1910 1920; 1930 1940 1950; 1960 1970 1980; 1990 2000 2010; 2020

Sun Village first appeared as a census designated place in the 2010 U.S. census.

=== Racial and ethnic composition ===
Sun Village CDP, California – Racial and ethnic composition Note: the US Census treats Hispanic/Latino as an ethnic category. This table excludes Latinos from the racial categories and assigns them to a separate category. Hispanics/Latinos may be of any race.
Race / Ethnicity (NH = Non-Hispanic)	Pop 2010	Pop 2020	% 2010	% 2020
White alone (NH)	3,180	2,123	27.50%	17.20%
Black or African American alone (NH)	739	536	6.39%	4.34%
Native American or Alaska Native alone (NH)	43	27	0.37%	0.22%
Asian alone (NH)	94	73	0.81%	0.59%
Native Hawaiian or Pacific Islander alone (NH)	14	5	0.12%	0.04%
Other race alone (NH)	9	45	0.08%	0.36%
Mixed race or Multiracial (NH)	175	234	1.51%	1.90%
Hispanic or Latino (any race)	7,311	9,302	63.22%	75.35%
Total	11,565	12,345	100.00%	100.00%

=== 2020 census ===
As of the 2020 census, Sun Village had a population of 12,345. The median age was 34.3 years. 26.8% of residents were under the age of 18 and 12.1% of residents were 65 years of age or older. For every 100 females, there were 104.4 males, and for every 100 females age 18 and over, there were 103.3 males.

0.0% of residents lived in urban areas, while 100.0% lived in rural areas.

There were 3,229 households in Sun Village, of which 42.6% had children under the age of 18 living in them. Of all households, 53.2% were married-couple households, 18.7% were households with a male householder and no spouse or partner present, and 20.2% were households with a female householder and no spouse or partner present. About 14.1% of all households were made up of individuals, and 6.2% had someone living alone who was 65 years of age or older.

There were 3,402 housing units, of which 5.1% were vacant. The homeowner vacancy rate was 1.2%, and the rental vacancy rate was 2.5%.

=== Demographic estimates ===
U.S. Census Bureau QuickFacts reports a population density of 1,142.6 inhabitants per square mile (441.2/km^{2}) and an average household size of 3.88.

QuickFacts also reports that 1,907 (57.1%) of households spoke a language other than English at home, 877 people (7.1%) were under the age of 5, and 5,778 people (46.8%) were between the ages of 18 and 64.

=== 2010 census ===
The 2010 United States census reported that Sun Village had a population of 11,565. The population density was 1,082.3 inhabitants per square mile (417.9/km^{2}). The racial makeup of Sun Village was 6,806 (58.8%) White (27.5% Non-Hispanic White), 809 (7.0%) African American, 167 (1.4%) Native American, 129 (1.1%) Asian, 24 (0.2%) Pacific Islander, 3,113 (26.9%) from other races, and 517 (4.5%) from two or more races. Hispanic or Latino of any race were 7,311 persons (63.2%).

The Census reported that out of 11,565 people, 11,565 (100%) lived in non-institutionalized group quarters, and 0 (0%) were institutionalized.

There were 1,502 households that (50.0%) had children under the age of 18 living in them, 1,788 (59.5%) were opposite-sex married couples living together, 391 (13.0%) had a female householder with no husband present, 251 (8.4%) had a male householder with no wife present. There were 206 (6.9%) unmarried opposite-sex partnerships, and 20 (0.7%) same-sex married couples or partnerships. 406 households (13.5%) were made up of individuals, and 137 (4.6%) had someone living alone who was 65 years of age or older. The average household size was 8.85. There were 2,430 families (80.9% of all households); the average family size was 12.18.

The population was spread out, with 3,583 people (31.0%) under the age of 18, 1,339 people (11.6%) aged 18 to 24, 2,715 people (23.5%) aged 25 to 44, 2,939 people (25.4%) aged 45 to 64, and 989 people (8.6%) who were 65 years of age or older. The median age was 31.4 years. For every 100 females, there were 106.6 males. For every 100 females age 18 and over, there were 86.0 males.

There were 3,343 housing units at an average density of 312.8 per square mile (120.8/km^{2}), of which 2,238 (66.95%) were owner-occupied, and 765 (33.05%) were occupied by renters. The homeowner vacancy rate was 2.9%; the rental vacancy rate was 5.4%.

=== Mapping L.A. ===
According to Mapping L.A., Mexican and German were the most common ancestries in 2000. Mexico and El Salvador were the most common foreign places of birth.

== Education ==
Sun Village is served by one elementary school district and one high school district: Keppel Union Elementary School District and Antelope Valley Union Joint High School District.

Keppel Union School District has two schools that serve grades K-8 and one school that serves grades 5-8:

- Daisy Gibson Elementary, which is located on the northern side of Sun Village, on Palmdale Boulevard.
- Antelope Elementary, which is located in the center, on Avenue S.
- Keppel Academy, located on the southern boundary, on Avenue U.

The Antelope Valley Union High School District has a high school that serves Sun Village and surrounding towns, Littlerock High School, built in 1989.
