= Littlerock, California =

- Census-designated place
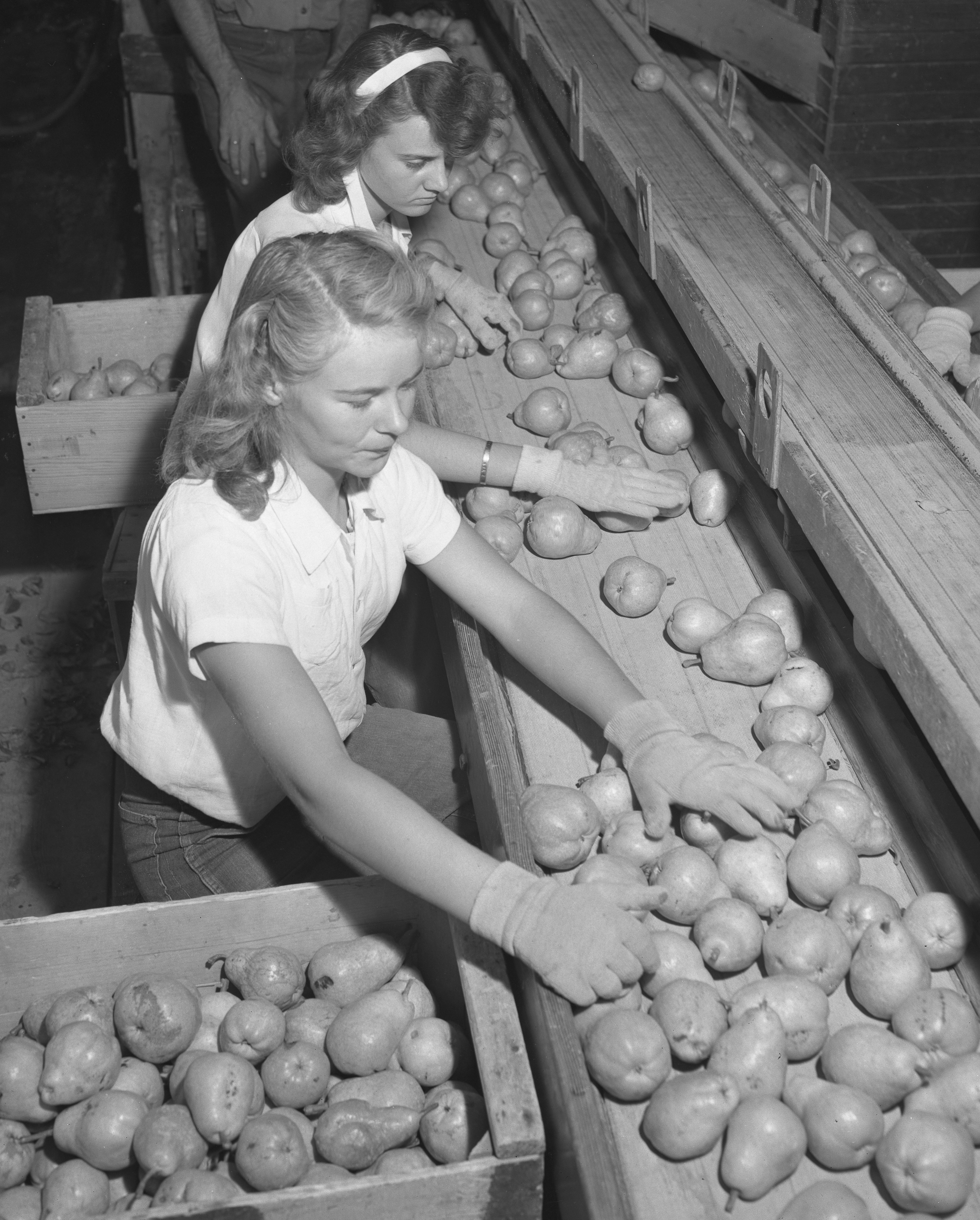
- Workers sorting pears, Bones & Son packinghouse, Littlerock 1946. Packers were promised an extra 25 cents for each "wormy" pear, but found only two in 27 tons of fruit.

- Location of Littlerock in Los Angeles County, California.

- Location within the Los Angeles metropolitan area Location in Southern California Location within California Location within the United States
- Coordinates: 34°31′30″N 117°59′24″W
- Country: United States
- State: California
- County: Los Angeles

Area
  - Total: 1.843 sq mi (4.774 km^{2})
  - Land: 1.842 sq mi (4.770 km^{2})
  - Water: 0.0015 sq mi (0.004 km^{2}) 0.08%
- Elevation: 2,890 ft (881 m)

Population (2020)
  - Total: 1,535
  - Density: 833.5/sq mi (321.8/km^{2})
- Time zone: UTC-8 (PST)
  - Summer (DST): UTC-7 (PDT)
- ZIP code: 93543
- Area code: 661
- FIPS code: 06-41880
- GNIS feature ID: 1660929

Littlerock is a census-designated place in Los Angeles County, California, United States. The population was 1,535 at the 2020 census, up from 1,377 at the 2010 census. The Littlerock, and Sun Village community, which is typically referred to as Littlerock, has a population of around 15,000. According to the Greater Antelope Valley Economic Alliance report of 2009, the Palmdale / Lancaster urban area has a population of 483,998, which Littlerock is a part of.

Littlerock is named after the Little Rock Wash that passes through the area and is known as "The Fruit Basket of the Antelope Valley." There were orchards of fruit trees such as almonds, apples, peaches, and pears, along the side of the roads around Highway 138.

== Geography ==
Littlerock is located 11 miles (18 km) southeast of Palmdale's Civic Center. It is surrounded by Palmdale to the northwest, Pearblossom to the southeast, Sun Village to the north, and the San Gabriel Mountains to the south.

According to the United States Census Bureau, Littlerock has a total area of 1.8 square miles (4.7 km^{2}), over 99% of which is land.

== Demographics ==
Historical population
Census	Pop.	Note	%±
1990	1,320		—
2000	1,402		6.2%
2010	1,377		−1.8%
2020	1,535		11.5%
U.S. Decennial Census; 1860–1870 1880-1890; 1900 1910 1920; 1930 1940 1950; 1960 1970 1980; 1990 2000 2010; 2020

Littlerock first appeared as a census designated place in the 1990 U.S. census.

=== Racial and ethnic composition ===
Littlerock CDP, California – Racial and ethnic composition Note: the US Census treats Hispanic/Latino as an ethnic category. This table excludes Latinos from the racial categories and assigns them to a separate category. Hispanics/Latinos may be of any race.
Race / Ethnicity (NH = Non-Hispanic)	Pop 2000	Pop 2010	Pop 2020	% 2000	% 2010	% 2020
White alone (NH)	758	489	367	54.07%	35.51%	23.91%
Black or African American alone (NH)	59	68	76	4.21%	4.94%	4.95%
Native American or Alaska Native alone (NH)	13	2	0	0.93%	0.15%	0.00%
Asian alone (NH)	3	23	24	0.21%	1.67%	1.56%
Native Hawaiian or Pacific Islander alone (NH)	0	4	0	0.00%	0.29%	0.00%
Other race alone (NH)	4	11	12	0.29%	0.80%	0.78%
Mixed race or Multiracial (NH)	8	35	43	0.57%	2.54%	2.80%
Hispanic or Latino (any race)	557	745	1,013	39.73%	54.10%	65.99%
Total	1,402	1,377	1,535	100.00%	100.00%	100.00%

=== 2020 census ===
As of the 2020 census, Littlerock had a population of 1,535. The median age was 33.3 years. Of residents, 28.9% were under the age of 18 and 11.6% were 65 years of age or older. For every 100 females, there were 110.0 males, and for every 100 females age 18 and over, there were 107.6 males age 18 and over.

Of residents, 0.0% lived in urban areas and 100.0% lived in rural areas.

There were 471 households, of which 36.1% had children under the age of 18 living in them. Of all households, 50.3% were married-couple households, 18.0% were households with a male householder and no spouse or partner present, and 24.8% were households with a female householder and no spouse or partner present. About 21.3% of all households were made up of individuals, and 11.5% had someone living alone who was 65 years of age or older.

There were 482 housing units, of which 2.3% were vacant. The homeowner vacancy rate was 0.0% and the rental vacancy rate was 2.0%.

=== 2010 census ===
The 2010 United States census reported that Littlerock had a population of 1,377. The population density was 747.0 inhabitants per square mile (288.4/km^{2}). The racial makeup of Littlerock was 808 (58.7%) White (35.5% Non-Hispanic White), 75 (5.4%) African American, 16 (1.2%) Native American, 24 (1.7%) Asian, 11 (0.8%) Pacific Islander, 373 (27.1%) from other races, and 70 (5.1%) from two or more races. Hispanic or Latino of any race were 745 persons (54.1%).

The Census reported that 1,375 people (99.9% of the population) lived in households, 2 (0.1%) lived in non-institutionalized group quarters, and 0 (0%) were institutionalized.

There were 417 households, out of which 193 (46.3%) had children under the age of 18 living in them, 224 (53.7%) were opposite-sex married couples living together, 61 (14.6%) had a female householder with no husband present, 34 (8.2%) had a male householder with no wife present. There were 28 (6.7%) unmarried opposite-sex partnerships, and 4 (1.0%) same-sex married couples or partnerships. 77 households (18.5%) were made up of individuals, and 24 (5.8%) had someone living alone who was 65 years of age or older. The average household size was 3.30. There were 319 families (76.5% of all households); the average family size was 3.69.

The age distribution was 419 people (30.4%) under the age of 18, 160 people (11.6%) aged 18 to 24, 345 people (25.1%) aged 25 to 44, 344 people (25.0%) aged 45 to 64, and 109 people (7.9%) who were 65 years of age or older. The median age was 32.3 years. For every 100 females, there were 98.7 males. For every 100 females age 18 and over, there were 97.1 males.

There were 461 housing units at an average density of 250.1 per square mile (96.6/km^{2}), of which 269 (64.5%) were owner-occupied, and 148 (35.5%) were occupied by renters. The homeowner vacancy rate was 2.5%; the rental vacancy rate was 10.3%. 867 people (63.0% of the population) lived in owner-occupied housing units and 508 people (36.9%) lived in rental housing units.

According to the 2010 United States census, Littlerock had a median household income of $42,617, with 9.5% of the population living below the federal poverty line.

=== 2000 census ===
As of the census of 2000, there were 1,402 people, 426 households, and 331 families residing in the census-designated place (CDP). The population density was 967.3 inhabitants per square mile (373.5/km^{2}). There were 470 housing units at an average density of 324.3 per square mile (125.2/km^{2}). The racial makeup of the CDP was 71.68% White, 4.78% African American, 1.07% Native American, 0.21% Asian, 19.76% from other races, and 2.50% from two or more races. Hispanic or Latino of any race were 39.73% of the population.

There were 426 households, out of which 49.3% had children under the age of 18 living with them, 56.1% were married couples living together, 12.4% had a female householder with no husband present, and 22.3% were non-families. 17.8% of all households were made up of individuals, and 4.9% had someone living alone who was 65 years of age or older. The average household size was 3.29 and the average family size was 3.71.

The age distribution was 38.5% under the age of 18, 7.5% from 18 to 24, 30.0% from 25 to 44, 16.5% from 45 to 64, and 7.5% who were 65 years of age or older. The median age was 29 years. For every 100 females, there were 98.0 males. For every 100 females age 18 and over, there were 99.5 males.

The median income for a household in the CDP was $39,000, and the median income for a family was $50,357. Males had a median income of $46,667 versus $45,625 for females. The per capita income for the CDP was $15,557. About 19.7% of families and 23.7% of the population were below the poverty line, including 28.6% of those under age 18 and 18.3% of those age 65 or over.

=== Mapping L.A. ===
According to Mapping L.A., Mexican and German were the most common ancestries in 2000. Mexico and El Salvador were the most common foreign places of birth.

== Politics ==
In the state legislature Littlerock is located in the 23rd senatorial district, represented by Republican Suzette Martinez Valladares, and in the 39th Assembly district, represented by Democrat Juan Carrillo. Federally, Littlerock is located in California's 27th congressional district, which has an D+3 Cook PVI.

The Los Angeles County Department of Health Services operates the Antelope Valley Health Center in Lancaster, serving Littlerock.

== Transportation ==
By road, the community is served by California State Route 138. Public transit service is provided by the Antelope Valley Transit Authority.

== Education ==
Littlerock is served by the Keppel Union Elementary School District and by the Antelope Valley Union Joint High School District.
