= Leona Valley, California =

- Census-designated place
- Location of Leona Valley in Los Angeles County, California.

- Location in the United States
- Coordinates: 34°37′6″N 118°17′14″W
- Country: United States
- State: California
- County: Los Angeles

Area
  - Total: 18.620 sq mi (48.226 km^{2})
  - Land: 18.593 sq mi (48.155 km^{2})
  - Water: 0.027 sq mi (0.071 km^{2}) 0.15%
- Elevation: 3,491 ft (1,064 m)

Population (2020)
  - Total: 1,555
  - Density: 83.63/sq mi (32.29/km^{2})
- Time zone: UTC-8 (Pacific (PST))
  - Summer (DST): UTC-7 (PDT)
- ZIP codes: 93551
- Area code: 661
- FIPS code: 06-41208
- GNIS feature ID: 2583056

Leona Valley (Leona, Spanish for "Lioness") is a census-designated place located in the geographic Leona Valley of northern Los Angeles County, California, United States, in the transition between the Sierra Pelona Mountains and Mojave Desert, just west of Palmdale and the Antelope Valley. The population was 1,555 at the 2020 census.

Leona Valley is best known for its agriculture, particularly cherries and wine grapes. The town of Leona Valley holds its annual Leona Valley Cherry Festival in honor of its agricultural heritage.

== Geography ==
Leona Valley is located approximately 10 miles (20 km) west of the Palmdale Civic Center in Southern California. Leona Valley town is located in its namesake, Leona Valley. This valley is a long, narrow valley separated from the Antelope Valley by the San Andreas Fault ridge, known as Ritter Ridge, so named after one of the settlers from Nebraska in the 1880s. The valley is about one mile wide and 25 miles (40 km) in length. The geographic Leona Valley is also home to the towns of Lake Hughes and Lake Elizabeth.

The ZIP Code is 93551 and the community is served by area code 661.

== History ==
Leona Valley's post colonial history can be best described as land abundant with cattle ranches. In the late 18th century, after the loss of the Tataviam Native Americans – the area's original inhabitants – to Indian Reductions as Mission Indians at the Mission San Fernando immigrants from Spain and Mexico quickly established themselves. The majority of the immigrants were primarily interested in the land in order to establish cattle ranches. During the 1830s, the ranches were broken up into smaller homesteads by farmers from Germany, France and the state of Nebraska. The Ritter family started one of the first wineries in this country in Leona Valley which was later shut down by the U.S. Prohibition period in the early 20th century.

In 1901 Frank D Hall bought the 3000 acre St. Anthony Ranch. The valley was then known as Leonis and he changed the name of the ranch to Leona Valley Ranch and set about building a dairy farm. The Ranch was most of the land west of Bouquet Canyon Rd. The dairy did not work out and the subdivision of the Leona Valley Ranch started in 1918. That first phase of the subdivision was for properties that had roads and water (either had water or was in an area known to be practical for drilling a well). One of the early sales was the southwest corner of Elizabeth Lake Rd and 90th St West. The Nolenberger's built a store and gas station on that lot which opened in 1924. The building is now Hemme Hay and Feed store. In 1927 Frank Hall incorporated Farm Home Builders to handle the next phase that required new roads and a water system. To that end Farm Home Builders took out a loan for $45,000. The Great Depression hit before many sold and it wasn't until the 1940s that most were sold.

The majority of those old large homestead parcels have since been partially subdivided and developed with a mix of custom residences, with Leona Valley.

== Demographics ==
Historical population
Census	Pop.	Note	%±
2010	1,607		—
2020	1,555		−3.2%
U.S. Decennial Census; 2000 2010; 2020

Leona Valley first appeared as a census designated place in the 2010 U.S. census.

=== Racial and ethnic composition ===
Leona Valley CDP, California – Racial and ethnic composition Note: the US Census treats Hispanic/Latino as an ethnic category. This table excludes Latinos from the racial categories and assigns them to a separate category. Hispanics/Latinos may be of any race.
Race / Ethnicity (NH = Non-Hispanic)	Pop 2010	Pop 2020	% 2010	% 2020
White alone (NH)	1,332	1,187	82.89%	76.33%
Black or African American alone (NH)	8	8	0.50%	0.51%
Native American or Alaska Native alone (NH)	3	7	0.19%	0.45%
Asian alone (NH)	23	19	1.43%	1.22%
Native Hawaiian or Pacific Islander alone (NH)	0	0	0.00%	0.00%
Other race alone (NH)	2	19	0.12%	1.22%
Mixed race or Multiracial (NH)	41	91	2.55%	5.85%
Hispanic or Latino (any race)	198	224	12.32%	14.41%
Total	1,607	1,555	100.00%	100.00%

=== 2020 census ===
As of the 2020 census, Leona Valley had a population of 1,555 and a population density of 83.6 inhabitants per square mile (32.3/km^{2}). The median age was 50.9 years. For every 100 females, there were 100.9 males, and for every 100 females age 18 and over, there were 98.3 males age 18 and over.

The age distribution was 262 people (16.8%) under the age of 18, 104 people (6.7%) aged 18 to 24, 304 people (19.5%) aged 25 to 44, 506 people (32.5%) aged 45 to 64, and 379 people (24.4%) who were 65 years of age or older.

0.0% of residents lived in urban areas, while 100.0% lived in rural areas.

The whole population lived in households. There were 621 households, out of which 148 (23.8%) had children under the age of 18 living in them, 358 (57.6%) were married-couple households, 32 (5.2%) were cohabiting couple households, 131 (21.1%) had a female householder with no partner present, and 100 (16.1%) had a male householder with no partner present. 126 households (20.3%) were one person, and 63 were one-person households with someone aged 65 or older. The average household size was 2.5. There were 461 families (74.2% of all households).

There were 653 housing units at an average density of 35.1 units per square mile (13.6 units/km^{2}), of which 621 (95.1%) were occupied and 32 (4.9%) were vacant. Of the occupied units, 529 (85.2%) were owner-occupied, and 92 (14.8%) were occupied by renters. The homeowner vacancy rate was 0.8% and the rental vacancy rate was 3.2%.

=== Income and poverty ===
The median household income in 2023 was $134,625, and the per capita income was $55,877. About 4.7% of families and 5.0% of the population were below the poverty line.

== Viticulture ==
The Reynolds Family Estate planted vineyards in 2001 and established Leona Valley Winery, pioneering a new wine region with the Leona Valley AVA (American Viticulture Area) and a new L.A. County Wine Ordinance promoting wineries and tasting rooms in the area.

== Government and infrastructure ==
The Los Angeles County Department of Health Services operates the Antelope Valley Health Center in Lancaster, serving Leona Valley.

== Education ==
Most of Leona Valley is served by the Westside Union Elementary School District, while a piece is served by the Hughes-Elizabeth Lakes Union Elementary School District. All of Leona Valley is within the Antelope Valley Union Joint High School District.
