= Gorman Joint School District =

School district in California

- 49847 Gorman School Road Gorman, California, 93243

District information
- Type: Public
- Grades: K–12
- NCES District ID: 0615600

Students and staff
- Students: 59 (2020–2021)

Other information
- Website: gormanschool.com

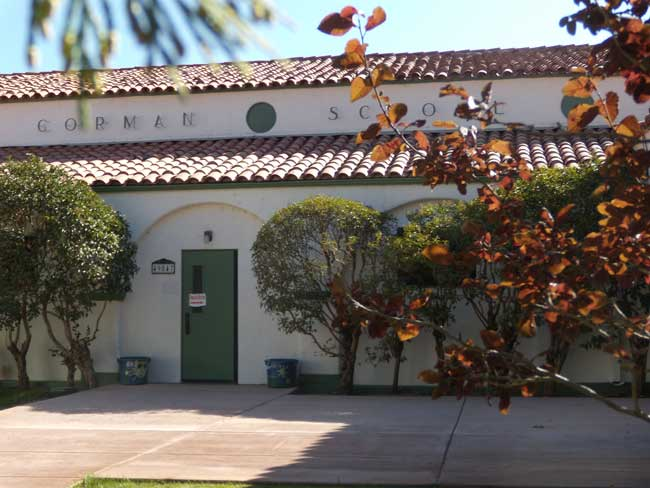
Gorman Elementary School has two classrooms.

Gorman Joint School District is a public school district in Gorman, California. It is the smallest school district in Los Angeles County.

== Gorman Elementary School ==
Accounts differ as to the origin of Gorman Elementary School, although the pioneer Ralphs family certainly played a role in its founding. According to researcher Harrison Irving Scott, the first school in the area appears to have been the one-room Manzana School, a mile south of Gorman, where in 1925 there were only four students — the Ralphs brothers, Glenn, Harry, Albert and Dewey. After it was torn down, the children went to Quail Lake School in another one-room schoolhouse. Gorman Elementary School was built by the federal government's Works Progress Administration in 1939.

Mary Barto Mertz from Rockland Township, Berks County, PA, was the first school teacher, living with Oscar and Mary Ralphs as a boarder in their home. (Ref: 1910 United States Federal Census, State of California, Los Angeles County, Fairmont Township, La Liebre Precinct, familyhttp://search.ancestryheritagequest.com/search/db.aspx?dbid=7884 - Oscar N. Ralphs) In 2009, Ruth Ralphs confirmed that the first teacher lived with her grandparents, Oscar and Mary Ralphs, but she couldn't remember the teacher's name. John "Glenn" Ralphs confirmed her identity as Mary "May" Barto Mertz. Ms. Mertz taught school in the Ralph's family living room, and continued for a time after the school was relocated (see below). She remained a friend of the family after she left to be married, and would visit Gorman from time to time, taking her son, George Dale Beasley with her.

Martha Forth was the second; she taught in 1941–1943.

Esther Pereira wrote in the Mountain Enterprise, however, that the Ralphs family "founded the school originally as the Quail Lake District. Classes were held in the Ralphs' family living room. The school was relocated to its present site and built on land donated by the Ralphs family, where it became known as the Gorman School District."

== Threats to the district's existence ==
I'd stand on my head in the middle of Interstate 5 to save this school.

— Cecilia DeFazio, reading aide, cook, and bus driver at Gorman School.

Gorman School District is the smallest in Los Angeles County, and over the years it has faced threats to its existence. In 1971 it was saved when the state Legislature narrowly defeated a measure that would have done away with school districts with fewer than 50 students. Attendance in Gorman School dropped to 32 students, and townspeople hustled to "borrow" 11 children from elsewhere in order to keep up the enrollment.

"Everybody in town immediately panicked," District Superintendent Lacy H. Ballagh said. "We knew that if the bill passed, our children would probably be sent to the Quartz Hill School District on the outskirts of Lancaster and almost 50 miles (80 km) away.

In November 1978 the district was threatened when funding was cut back by the passage that year of California Proposition 13 (1978), which limited school district support from the state. Reduced salaries and other cost-cutting measures saved the district at that time.

By the fall of 2008, there was only one child from Gorman attending the elementary school; 40 came from the El Tejon Unified School District and one was from Neenach in the Westside Union School District. The Los Angeles County Office of Education had warned a year earlier that the district might be dissolved if it did not find a way to solve its problems.

But a land developer, Centennial Founders, in the meantime stepped forth with the desire to save the school district until it could build a proposed 23,000-home planned city east of Interstate 5 on Tejon Ranch property along Highway 138. It agreed to pay for a consultant to help the district find ways to stay afloat financially until the homes could be built and new schools constructed and operated there by the Gorman district.

== Enrollment ==
In September 2008, Gorman Joint School District had just one K-8 elementary school with an enrollment of 42 pupils, only one of whom lived in Gorman. The others were transfers from neighboring El Tejon Unified School District or Neenach in the Westside Union School District.

In December 2010, Superintendent and Principal Martin Schmidt said that the district was at that point entirely a "school of choice" which had more than doubled its enrollment to 98 students and increased its Academic Performance Score from 679 to 784, with 800 being the goal for achievement. The increase in enrollment brought twice as much money from the state as before. Johannis Andrews, the principal for 2011-2012, said in August 2011 that attendance had increased to 101 students, with five teachers.

In order to bring in additional average-daily-attendance funds from the state, the district before 2008 took on responsibility for the Gorman Learning Center charter school in Redlands, 129 miles (208 km) away (Google map). The center had about 800 home-school students enrolled.

== Ruth Ralphs ==
In January 2008, Ruth Ralphs was honored for 33 years of service to the Gorman School District. Ralphs, who was born on February 29, 1920, in Townsville, Queensland, Australia, died on December 30, 2010. She was secretary-treasurer of James L. Ralphs Inc. and vice president of Tri-Foods, which owned Carl's Jr. in Gorman.

"During many of those 33 years, Ruth also managed Ralphs' family enterprises (such as gas stations, motels, a cafe, grazing rights and an antenna) while serving as postmistress of the Gorman Post Office," the local newspaper, the Mountain Enterprise, reported.

== Administration ==
In 2014, of all school districts in Los Angeles County, this district had the highest per-pupil administrative cost.
