= Eastside High School (Lancaster, California) =

Secondary school in California, US

Location
- 3200 E. Ave. J-8; Lancaster, California 93535; United States; 34°40′53″N 118°04′16″W

Information
- Established: August 2005; 21 years ago
- School district: Antelope Valley Union High School District
- NCES School ID: 060282010823
- Principal: Blake Stanford
- Staff: 105.83 (FTE)
- Grades: 9–12
- Enrollment: 2,592 (2023-2024)
- Student to teacher ratio: 24.49
- Colors: Purple & Black
- Mascot: Lion
- Website: www.eastsidehs.org

Eastside High School is located in Lancaster, California, and is part of the Antelope Valley Union High School District. Eastside is the 8th and newest school in the district. The school opened to freshmen in August 2005, with the first class graduating in May 2009. Before May 2009 the school was housed in portables. Classes are now held at the newly constructed site adjacent to the former site. It is a public school that serves 2592 students in grades 9-12. A school's Academic Performance Index (API) is a scale that ranges from 200 to 1000 and is calculated from the school's performance in the California Assessment of Student Performance and Progress (CAASPP) Program. The state has set 800 as the API target for all schools to meet.

Eastside High School had an API growth score of 660 in 2010 and currently has maintained its API growth of 660. California uses the Academic Performance Index (API) to measure annual school performance and year-to-year improvement. Eastside High School's 2010 base score was 630, and the school did meet its 2010 school-wide growth target.

Eastside High School has numerous extracurricular activities for its students such as: a dual gender band, a dual gender wrestling team, separate gender basketball teams, separate gender volleyball teams, an isolated sex baseball team, an isolated sex softball team, a dual gender football team and girls flag football.

The school mascot is the Eastside Lion, with school colors of purple and black.

== Demographics ==
The majority of the Eastside High population is Hispanic, with over 58 percent of the students identifying as Latino. The second most numerous ethnic group found at Eastside high school is African Americans. Nearly 28 percent of the students identify as African American. White students make up 8 percent of Eastside High school. Finally, only 3 percent of the students identify themselves with two or more ethnic groups, 1 percent identify as of Asian background, and only 10 individual students enrolled self-identified as American Indians or Alaska Natives.
