= Lake Los Angeles, California =

- Census-designated place
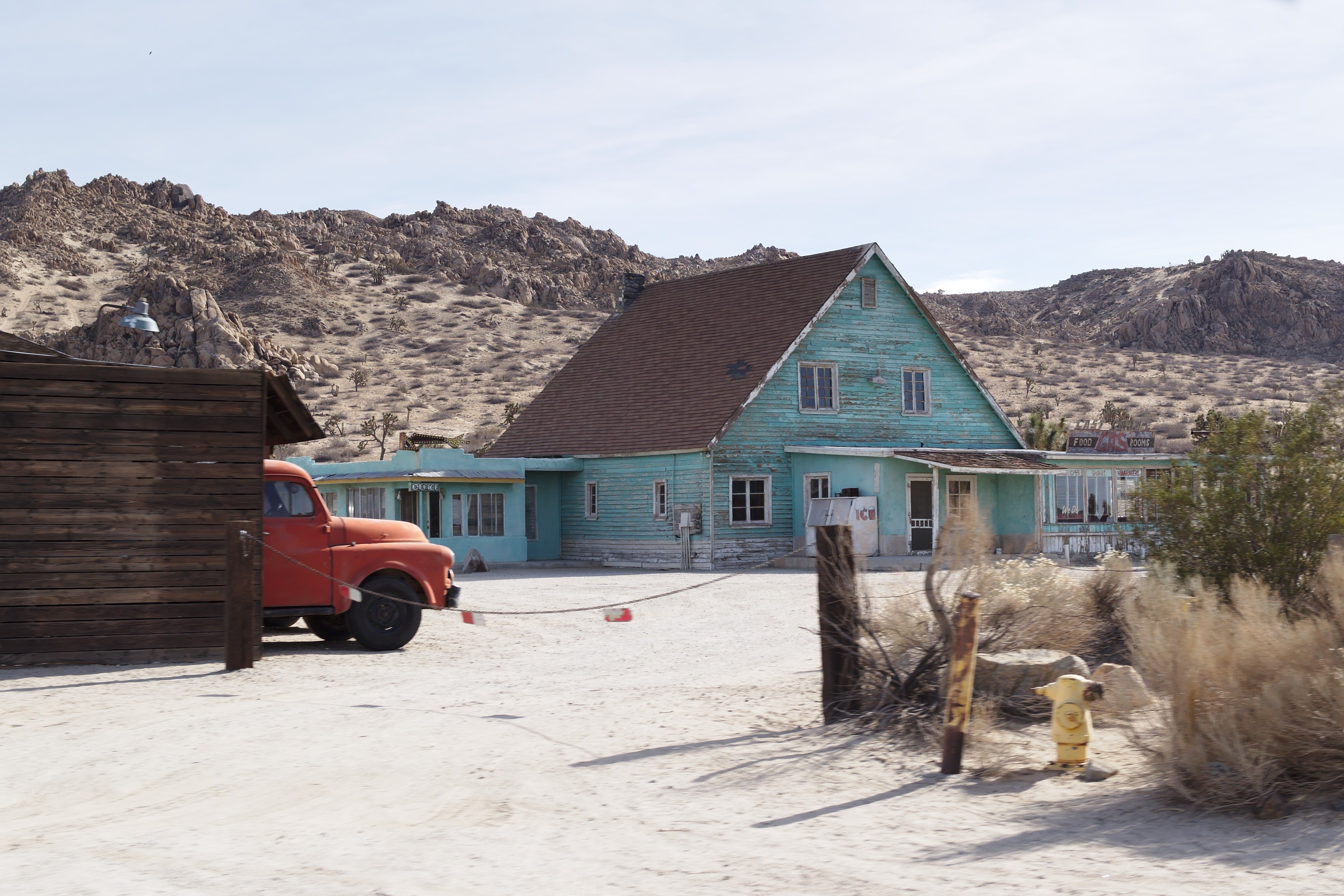
- Club Ed, popular filming location
- Interactive map of Lake Los Angeles, California
- Location in California Location in the United States
- Coordinates: 34°37′4″N 117°50′1″W
- Country: United States
- State: California
- County: Los Angeles

Area
  - Total: 9.790 sq mi (25.355 km^{2})
  - Land: 9.741 sq mi (25.229 km^{2})
  - Water: 0.049 sq mi (0.126 km^{2}) 0.5%
- Elevation: 2,661 ft (811 m)

Population (2020)
  - Total: 13,187
  - Density: 1,353.8/sq mi (522.69/km^{2})
- Time zone: UTC-8 (PST)
  - Summer (DST): UTC-7 (PDT)
- ZIP codes: 93535 (North of Avenue O) & 93591 (South of Avenue O)
- Area code: 661
- FIPS code: 06-39612
- GNIS feature ID: 1666854

Lake Los Angeles is a census-designated place (CDP) in Los Angeles County, California, United States. The population was 13,187 at the 2020 census, up from 12,328 at the 2010 census. It is located 17 miles (27 km) east of Palmdale's Civic Center. According to the Greater Antelope Valley Economic Alliance report of 2009, the Palmdale / Lancaster urban area has a population of 483,998, of which Lake Los Angeles is a part.

== Transportation ==
Public transportation services are operated by the Antelope Valley Transit Authority. The route 50 bus travels from Lake Los Angeles's Town Center Plaza to Owen Memorial Park in Lancaster. Route 51 also serves Town Center Plaza, but terminates at Palmdale Transportation Center. Each route runs about every two hours all week, with a one-way fare of $1.50.

== History ==
The region was once called Los Angeles Buttes, since they were the only ones in the northern part of the county. The eponymous lakes (one dedicated to fishing and one dedicated to swimming and boating) have dried up. The fishing lake was stocked with trout, bass and catfish. In 1967, during the 1960s land speculation boom in the Antelope Valley, land developers bought 4,000 acres (16 km^{2}) in the region, subdivided it into 4,465 lots, and artificially refilled the natural lake and named it Lake Los Angeles as an enticement to land buyers. Advertisements showed a water skier on the lake (which was probably no more than 5 feet deep) and a showcase home on the top of the nearby hill, giving the impression of a resort town. There was a country club and a high-end restaurant that overlooked the large recreational lake. There was also a small store/bar and grill. Streets were named Biglake Avenue, Lakespring Avenue and Longmeadow Avenue to draw attention away from the fact that the town was in fact a barren desert used for filming westerns. The lake was left to evaporate in the early 1980s after the initial developers sold their interests. Much of the land was sold to buyers who never visited the area. There are efforts to refill the lake, but the main obstacle has been funding.

The film history of the region dates back to 1938. Numerous movies, serials, commercials and television series were filmed in Lake Los Angeles for decades. Filmed segments and stock footage of Bonanza episodes made at the region include "The Mission", "Gallagher's Sons", "Twilight Town", "Big Shadow on the Land", "The Deed and the Dilemma", "The Oath", "Second Chance" and "Meena." Lake Los Angeles has two permanent film sets: Four Aces, a replica mid-century style rest stop with a diner, gas station and motel, used in the films Identity, Fall, and Palm Springs; and Club Ed, a more dilapidated early 20th century gas station and two-story house, originally built for the 1991 film Eye of the Storm, since used in The Devil's Rejects and Torque. Both locations and their surrounding areas have been used for television series, feature films, music videos, and television commercials.

== Demographics ==
Historical population
Census	Pop.	Note	%±
1990	7,977		—
2000	11,523		44.5%
2010	12,328		7.0%
2020	13,187		7.0%
U.S. Decennial Census; 1860–1870 1880-1890; 1900 1910 1920; 1930 1940 1950; 1960 1970 1980; 1990 2000 2010; 2020

Lake Los Angeles first appeared as a census designated place in the 1990 U.S. census as part of the North Antelope census county division.

=== Racial and ethnic composition ===
Lake Los Angeles CDP, California – Racial and ethnic composition Note: the US Census treats Hispanic/Latino as an ethnic category. This table excludes Latinos from the racial categories and assigns them to a separate category. Hispanics/Latinos may be of any race.
Race / Ethnicity (NH = Non-Hispanic)	Pop 2000	Pop 2010	Pop 2020	% 2000	% 2010	% 2020
White alone (NH)	5,694	3,937	3,097	49.41%	31.94%	23.49%
Black or African American alone (NH)	1,363	1,310	945	11.83%	10.63%	7.17%
Native American or Alaska Native alone (NH)	103	75	65	0.89%	0.61%	0.49%
Asian alone (NH)	98	99	76	0.85%	0.80%	0.58%
Native Hawaiian or Pacific Islander alone (NH)	19	25	12	0.16%	0.20%	0.09%
Other race alone (NH)	19	28	105	0.16%	0.23%	0.80%
Mixed race or Multiracial (NH)	358	250	376	3.11%	2.03%	2.85%
Hispanic or Latino (any race)	3,869	6,604	8,511	33.58%	53.57%	64.54%
Total	11,523	12,328	13,187	100.00%	100.00%	100.00%

=== 2020 census ===
As of the 2020 census, Lake Los Angeles had a population of 13,187 and a population density of 1,353.8 inhabitants per square mile (522.7/km^{2}). The median age was 33.3 years. The age distribution was 28.1% under the age of 18, 10.7% aged 18 to 24, 25.5% aged 25 to 44, 24.7% aged 45 to 64, and 11.0% who were 65 years of age or older. For every 100 females there were 101.8 males, and for every 100 females age 18 and over there were 99.7 males.

The census reported that 99.8% of the population lived in households, 0.2% lived in non-institutionalized group quarters, and no one was institutionalized. It also reported that 0.0% of residents lived in urban areas, while 100.0% lived in rural areas.

There were 3,637 households, of which 42.1% had children under the age of 18 living in them. Of all households, 49.8% were married-couple households, 7.6% were cohabiting couple households, 24.4% had a female householder with no spouse or partner present, and 18.2% had a male householder with no spouse or partner present. About 15.6% of households were made up of individuals, and 5.9% had someone living alone who was 65 years of age or older. The average household size was 3.62. There were 2,886 families (79.4% of all households).

There were 3,762 housing units at an average density of 386.2 units per square mile (149.1 units/km^{2}), of which 96.7% were occupied. Of the occupied units, 72.5% were owner-occupied and 27.5% were occupied by renters. Of all housing units, 3.3% were vacant, with a homeowner vacancy rate of 1.0% and a rental vacancy rate of 2.4%.

=== Income and poverty ===
In 2023, the US Census Bureau estimated that the median household income was $60,999, and the per capita income was $21,828. About 10.8% of families and 13.7% of the population were below the poverty line.

=== 2010 census ===
At the 2010 census Lake Los Angeles had a population of 12,328. The population density was 1,259.3 inhabitants per square mile (486.2/km^{2}). The racial makeup of Lake Los Angeles was 6,862 (55.7%) White (31.9% Non-Hispanic White), 1,388 (11.3%) African American, 178 (1.4%) Native American, 116 (0.9%) Asian, 27 (0.2%) Pacific Islander, 3,068 (24.9%) from other races, and 689 (5.6%) from two or more races. Hispanic or Latino of any race were 6,604 persons (53.6%).

The census reported that 12,299 people (99.8% of the population) lived in households, 29 (0.2%) lived in non-institutionalized group quarters, and no one was institutionalized.

There were 3,267 households, 1,709 (52.3%) had children under the age of 18 living in them, 1,793 (54.9%) were opposite-sex married couples living together, 548 (16.8%) had a female householder with no husband present, 324 (9.9%) had a male householder with no wife present. There were 265 (8.1%) unmarried opposite-sex partnerships, and 20 (0.6%) same-sex married couples or partnerships. 445 households (13.6%) were one person and 138 (4.2%) had someone living alone who was 65 or older. The average household size was 3.76. There were 2,665 families (81.6% of households); the average family size was 4.08.

The age distribution was 4,089 people (33.2%) under the age of 18, 1,390 people (11.3%) aged 18 to 24, 2,882 people (23.4%) aged 25 to 44, 3,030 people (24.6%) aged 45 to 64, and 937 people (7.6%) who were 65 or older. The median age was 29.9 years. For every 100 females, there were 100.8 males. For every 100 females age 18 and over, there were 98.8 males.

There were 3,658 housing units at an average density of 373.7 per square mile, of the occupied units 2,374 (72.7%) were owner-occupied and 893 (27.3%) were rented. The homeowner vacancy rate was 4.5%; the rental vacancy rate was 7.4%. 8,418 people (68.3% of the population) lived in owner-occupied housing units and 3,881 people (31.5%) lived in rental housing units.

According to the 2010 United States Census, Lake Los Angeles had a median household income of $45,440, with 27.1% of the population living below the federal poverty line.

=== Mapping L.A. ===
Mapping L.A. reported that Mexican and German were the most common ancestries according to the 2000 census. Mexico and El Salvador were the most common foreign places of birth.

== Government ==
In the California State Legislature, Lake Los Angeles is in the 23rd senatorial district, represented by Republican Suzette Martinez Valladares, and in the 39th Assembly district, represented by Democrat Juan Carrillo.

In the United States House of Representatives, Lake Los Angeles is in California's 23rd congressional district, represented by Republican Jay Obernolte.

== Public services ==
The Los Angeles County Sheriff's Department (LASD) operates the Lancaster Station in Lancaster, serving Lake Los Angeles.

The Los Angeles County Department of Health Services operates the Antelope Valley Health Center in Lancaster, serving Lake Los Angeles.

== Education ==
Most of the CDP is served by the Wilsona Elementary School District while a portion is served by the Keppel Union Elementary School District. All of it is served by the Antelope Valley Union Joint High School District.
