= Knight High School =

Four-year public high school located in Palmdale, California

Coordinates: 34.56372°N 118.00857°W

Location
- 37423 70th St. East; Palmdale, California 93552; U.S.A.

Information
- Type: Public
- Established: 2003; 23 years ago
- School district: Antelope Valley Union High School District
- Principal: Laura Tweedy-Ferguson
- Staff: 114.46 (FTE)
- Grades: 9–12
- Enrollment: 2,325 (2025–2026)
- Student to teacher ratio: 22.02
- Colors: Black; Gold
- Team name: Hawks
- Website: www.knightpalmdalehs.org

Knight High School is a four-year public high school located in Palmdale, California, and is part of the Antelope Valley Union High School District. Knight High was the 6th general education high school to join the district. The high school opened to freshmen in August 2003, and these students formed the first graduating class on May 31, 2007. The high school was named after test pilot and politician William J. "Pete" Knight. The school has received much recognition for its band program, which has placed first in many events.

== Advanced Placement program ==
Knight High has many different Advanced Placement programs and college-bound courses, meant to ensure a direct path to college with their school vision being that "Every student at Knight High School will have the option of attending a four-year college or university." Knight High School currently has the largest enrollment in Advanced Placement classes of any of the high schools in the AV Union High School District, as well as the highest number of students receiving scores of 3 or higher on Advanced Placement (AP) exams. In September 2007, Knight High had 28 students recognized by the College Board as AP Scholars.

Knight High School has an extensive AP (Advanced Placement) program. Students may take AP courses in many subjects, including, but not limited to: English Language, English Literature, Statistics, Calculus, World History, US History, United States Government, Computer Science, Physics, Chemistry, Biology, and Studio Art.

== Notable alumni ==
- Solomon Byrd professional NFL defensive end for the Houston Texans
- Paul George professional NBA All-Star forward for the Philadelphia 76ers
- Christian Roland-Wallace professional NFL cornerback for the Kansas City Chiefs
