= Eastside Union School District =

School district in California, USA

Address
- 44938 North 30th Street East Lancaster, California, 93535; United States

District information
- Type: Public
- Grades: K–8
- NCES District ID: 0611910

Students and staff
- Students: 3,167
- Teachers: 134.84
- Staff: 176.62
- Student–teacher ratio: 23.49

Other information
- Website: www.eastsideusd.org

The Eastside Union School District is a school district that serves the eastern part of the city of Lancaster, California (USA).

The Eastside Union School District has approximately 3,500 students enrolled in four elementary schools and one junior high school.

The Eastside Union School District is only serving Transitional Kindergarten through the 8th grade. All public high school level education (9th – 12th grades) in the metropolitan area is provided by the Antelope Valley Union High School District.

== List of schools ==
=== Elementary schools ===
- Columbia Elementary School
- Eastside Elementary School
- Tierra Bonita Elementary School
- Enterprise Elementary School

=== Junior high schools ===
- Gifford C. Cole Middle School

== See also ==
- List of school districts in California
- Lancaster School District
- Westside Union School District
