= Lancaster High School (California) =

Location
- 44701 32nd Street West; Lancaster, California 93536; United States; 34°41′42″N 118°11′26″W

Information
- School type: Public
- Established: 1995
- School district: Antelope Valley Union High School District
- Principal: Zachary Mercier
- Teaching staff: 108.07 (on an FTE basis)
- Grades: 9 to 12
- Gender: Co-educational
- Enrollment: 2,697 (2023–24)
- Student to teacher ratio: 24.96
- Campus type: Suburban
- Colors: Red, white, and navy
- Nickname: Eagles
- Accreditation: Western Association of Schools and Colleges
- Newspaper: The Omniscient Eagle
- Yearbook: Aerie
- Website: www.lancasterhs.org

Lancaster High School is a public, co-educational high school located in Lancaster, California, United States. Founded in 1995, it is the sixth oldest comprehensive high school in the Antelope Valley Union High School District.

== 2022 lockdown incident ==
On September 14, 2022, Lancaster High School was placed on lockdown due to multiple reports of an active shooter on campus. Los Angeles County Sheriff’s deputies swarmed the campus and conducted a room-by-room and building-by-building search following the call for service. After a thorough search of the campus by law enforcement partners, there was no evidence of a crime and the report was determined to be a prank call. The incident also prompted a lockdown at West Wind Elementary School on 36th Street West. It also prompted Antelope Valley College to cancel a previously scheduled evacuation drill. The campus remained open.

== Notable alumni ==
- Adam Wheeler (1999), Greco-Roman wrestler, won bronze medal at 2008 Summer Olympics
- Robert Arnold (2007), basketball player, played professionally overseas
- Dewayne Dedmon (2009), NBA basketball player
