= Keppel Union School District =

School district in California

Address
- 9330 East Avenue U Littlerock, California, 93543; United States

District information
- Type: Public
- Grades: K–12
- NCES District ID: 0619440

Students and staff
- Students: 2,594 (2020–2021)
- Teachers: 100.0 (FTE)
- Staff: 165.81 (FTE)
- Student–teacher ratio: 25.94:1

Other information
- Website: www.keppelunion.org

The Keppel Union School District is a school district that serves the far eastern parts of the city of Palmdale, California, USA, and its immediate suburbs including Littlerock, Pearblossom, Sun Village, Llano, and Lake Los Angeles.

The Keppel Union School District has approximately 3,100 students enrolled in 6 schools:

- 5 elementary schools
- 1 junior high school
- 1 Alternative school

The Keppel Union School District serves only kindergarten through the 8th grade level. All other high school level of education (9th - 12th grades) in the metropolitan area is provided by the Antelope Valley Union High School District.

== List of schools ==
=== Elementary Schools ===
- Alpine Elementary School (K through 8th grade)
- Antelope Elementary School (K through 8th grade)
- Gibson Elementary School (K through 8th grade)
- Lake Los Angeles School (K through 8th grade)
- Pearblossom Elementary School (K through 8th grade)

As of the 2011-2012 school year (starting August 8, 2011), each of the above elementary schools mentioned expanded into the eighth grade so that each Keppel Elementary School campus will include kindergarten to the eighth grade (K through 8th grade).

=== Junior high school ===
- Keppel Academy (5th, 6th, 7th, & 8th grade)

Keppel Academy operated under the name of Almondale Middle School when it was built in 1959 to July 1, 2010 when the Keppel Union School District board members renamed the campus to Keppel Academy. Keppel Academy added the 5th grade level of education to its campus in the 2013-2014 school year after three school years of only having three grade levels (6th through 8th).

=== Alternate Schools ===
- Desert View Community Day School (K-8th grade)

== See also ==
- List of school districts in California
- Palmdale School District
- Westside Union School District
