= Westside Union School District =

School district in California, United States

Address
- 41914 50th Street West Quartz Hill, California, 93536; United States

District information
- Type: Public
- Grades: K–8
- NCES District ID: 0642120

Students and staff
- Students: 9,172 (2020–2021)
- Teachers: 357.34 (FTE)
- Staff: 440.14 (FTE)
- Student–teacher ratio: 25.67:1

Other information
- Website: www.westside.k12.ca.us

The Westside Union School District in Southern California serves the western parts of Palmdale and Lancaster and their immediate suburbs, including Quartz Hill, Del Sur, Leona Valley, Antelope Acres, and Neenach.

It enrolls transitional kindergarten through eighth grade. High school education (ninth through 12th grades) is provided by the Antelope Valley Union High School District.

== Schools operated by the district ==
As of December 1, 2018, the district has approximately 9,600 students enrolled in 13 schools:

- 6 Transitional Kindergarten - Sixth Grade schools
- 2 Transitional Kindergarten - Eighth Grade schools
- 2 Kindergarten - Sixth Grade schools
- 3 Sixth Grade - Eighth Grade schools

=== Elementary ===
- Cottonwood Elementary School, Palmdale
- Esperanza Elementary School, Palmdale
- Gregg Anderson Academy
- Quartz Hill Elementary School, Quartz Hill
- Rancho Vista Elementary School, Palmdale
- Sundown Elementary School, Quartz Hill
- Valley View Elementary School, West Lancaster/ Borderline Quartz Hill

=== Middle ===
- Hillview Middle School, Palmdale
- Joe Walker Middle School, Quartz Hill
- Westside Academy, Quartz Hill

=== Combined elementary and middle ===
- Anaverde Hills School, Palmdale
- Del Sur School, Antelope Acres
- Leona Valley School, Leona Valley

== See also ==
- List of school districts in California
- Palmdale School District
- Lancaster School District
- Keppel Union School District
- Eastside Union School District
