= Palmdale School District =

School district in Palmdale, California

Address
- 39139 10th Street East Palmdale, California, 93550; United States

District information
- Type: Public
- Grades: K–12
- NCES District ID: 0629580

Students and staff
- Students: 17,525 (2020–2021)
- Teachers: 753.75 (FTE)
- Staff: 1,272.23 (FTE)
- Student–teacher ratio: 23.25:1

Other information
- Website: www.palmdalesd.org

The Palmdale School District is a public school district located in Palmdale, California that administers 28 schools and other public education institutions, the majority of which are elementary and middle schools.

== History ==
The Palmdale School District was formed in 1888 after members of the original "Palmenthal" settlement in the present-day Palmdale area petitioned for the construction of a schoolhouse in their small community. The district's first school year commenced on October 8, 1888, and concluded on June 18, 1889. In 1908, a new school, the Palmdale Grammar School, was built to accommodate the growing population of Palmdale. The old schoolhouse was closed in 1910 but was eventually restored and moved to its current location in McAdam Park.

== Schools ==
Approximately 18,000 students are enrolled in the Palmdale School District. The district consists of 28 schools:

The Palmdale School District primarily serves kindergarten through the 8th grade but Palmdale Academy Charter School serves grades K–12 per its charter. Currently, the Palmdale School District Superintendent is Raul Maldonado. The district consists of 28 schools. All PSD schools are located within Palmdale, California.

=== Charter Schools ===
- Palmdale Academy Charter School (9-12)

=== Preschools ===
- Early Childhood Education

=== Elementary Schools ===
- Barrel Springs Elementary School
- Buena Vista Elementary School
- Chaparral Prep Academy
- Cimarron Elementary School
- Desert Rose Elementary School
- Golden Poppy Elementary School
- Joshua Hills Elementary School
- Manzanita Elementary School
- Mesquite Elementary School
- Ocotillo Elementary School
- Palm Tree Elementary School
- Quail Valley Elementary School
- Summerwind Elementary School
- Tamarisk Elementary School
- Tumbleweed Elementary School
- Yucca Elementary School
- Marryot (Roy R.) Elementary School (Defunct Demolished after 1989)

=== Middle schools ===
- Cactus Magnet Academy
- Desert Willow Magnet Magnet Academy
- SAGE Magnet Academy
- David G. Millen Magnet Academy
- Shadow Hills Magnet Academy

=== International Baccalaureate Schools ===
- Palmdale Learning Plaza

=== Dual Language Immersion Schools ===
- Los Amigos School
- Dos Caminos School

=== Special Education Schools ===
- Yellen Learning Center
- First Steps
- Palmdale Discovery Center

=== Alternative Education Schools ===
- Oak Tree Learning Center
- Innovations Academy

== See also ==
- List of school districts in California
- Acton-Agua Dulce Unified School District
- Keppel Union School District
- Westside Union School District
