= Lancaster School District (California) =

School district in California

Address
- 44711 North Cedar Avenue Lancaster, California, 93534; United States

District information
- Type: Public
- Grades: K–8th
- Established: 1885
- Superintendent: Michele Bowers
- NCES District ID: 0620880

Students and staff
- Students: 13,594 (2020–21)
- Teachers: 582.55 (FTE)
- Staff: 925.19 (FTE)
- Student–teacher ratio: 23.34:1

Other information
- Website: www.lancsd.org

The Lancaster School District is a school district that serves a major part of the city of Lancaster, California

The Lancaster School District was first formed in 1885. Approximately 15,500 students are enrolled in the Lancaster School District. The district consists of 21 schools:

- 1 Preschool
- 14 Elementary schools
- 5 Junior high schools
- 1 Alternative education school
- 1 Special education school

The Lancaster School District serves Kindergarten through the 8th grade. All public high school level education (9th – 12th grades) in the metropolitan area is provided by the Antelope Valley Union High School District.

== List of schools ==
Most of the district's 82.5 square miles (214 km^{2}) lies within the City of Lancaster with a small portion in the unincorporated boundaries of the Los Angeles County. All Lancaster School District school properties are located within the city limits of Lancaster.

=== Elementary schools ===
- Desert View Elementary School
- Discovery School
- El Dorado Elementary School
- Jack Northrop Elementary School
- Joshua Elementary School
- Lincoln Elementary School
- Linda Verde K-8 Dual Language School
- Mariposa Computer Science Magnet School
- Miller Elementary School
- Monte Vista Elementary School
- Nancy Cory Elementary School
- Sierra Elementary School
- Sunnydale Elementary School
- West Wind Elementary School

=== Junior high schools ===
- Amargosa Creek Middle School
- Endeavour Middle School
- Fulton & Alsbury Academy
- New Vista Middle School
- Piute Middle School

=== Alternative education schools ===
The Leadership Academy (Formerly: Crossroads Alternative School)

- RISE (K-8)

=== Special education schools ===
The Promise Academy(Formerly: Linda Verde Center)

== See also ==
- Drennan v. Star Paving Co.: A court case involving the construction of Monte Vista Elementary School
- List of school districts in California
