= Antelope Valley Union High School District =

School district in California, United States

Location
- Antelope Valley, California; Los Angeles County United States

District information
- Type: Public
- Grades: 7th–12th
- Superintendent: Greg Nehen

Students and staff
- Teachers: 1,035.20 (FTE)

Other information
- Website: avdistrict.org

The Antelope Valley Union High School District (AVHSD) is located in the Antelope Valley area of California, in northern Los Angeles County.

The union high school district includes eight public high schools, one trade school, and two continuation high schools in the cities of Palmdale and Lancaster and their immediate suburbs. The district also recently opened three middle schools (grades 7–8). Two are in Palmdale & one is in Quartz Hill. The district also provides online instruction via their Virtual Academy for grades 7–12. The office of Virtual Academy is in Quartz Hill. The main district office is located in Lancaster. The Superintendent of the A.V.U.H.S.D. is Greg Nehen.

The A.V.U.H.S.D. cares for all high school level education in the metropolitan area. The elementary and junior high education is cared for by the Palmdale School District, Lancaster School District, Westside Union School District, Keppel Union School District, Wilsona School District, or Eastside Union School District depending on where the student lives.

== Governing Board ==
The Antelope Valley Union High School District elects a five-member governing board based on geographical districts. The elections are plurality and are held on a Tuesday after the first Monday in November of even-numbered years.

== Athletic League Affiliation ==
All eight comprehensive high schools in the Antelope Valley Union High School District compete in the Golden League, a CIF-Southern Section affiliated league.

== List of schools ==
=== Comprehensive High School in Littlerock ===
- Littlerock High School

=== Comprehensive High Schools in Palmdale ===
- Highland High School
- Palmdale High School
- Knight High School

=== Comprehensive High Schools in Lancaster ===
- Antelope Valley High School
- Eastside High School
- Lancaster High School
- Quartz Hill High School

=== Early college school ===
- SOAR High School

=== Trade School ===
Antelope Valley Regional Occupational Program (AV ROP) in Palmdale

=== Continuation Schools ===
- R. Rex Parris Continuation High School in Palmdale
- Desert Winds Continuation High School in Lancaster
- Phoenix Continuation High School in Lancaster

=== Online School ===
The Virtual Academy grades 7-12 office is at Soar Prep Academy.

=== Academy Prep Junior Highs ===
+Soar Prep Academy in Quartz Hill +Palmdale Prep in Palmdale +Knight Prep in Palmdale

== See also ==
- List of school districts in California
- Palmdale School District
- Lancaster School District (California)
- Westside Union School District
- Keppel Union School District
- Eastside Union School District
