= Buckweed Fire =

2007 wildfire in Southern California

- Part of the 2007 California wildfires
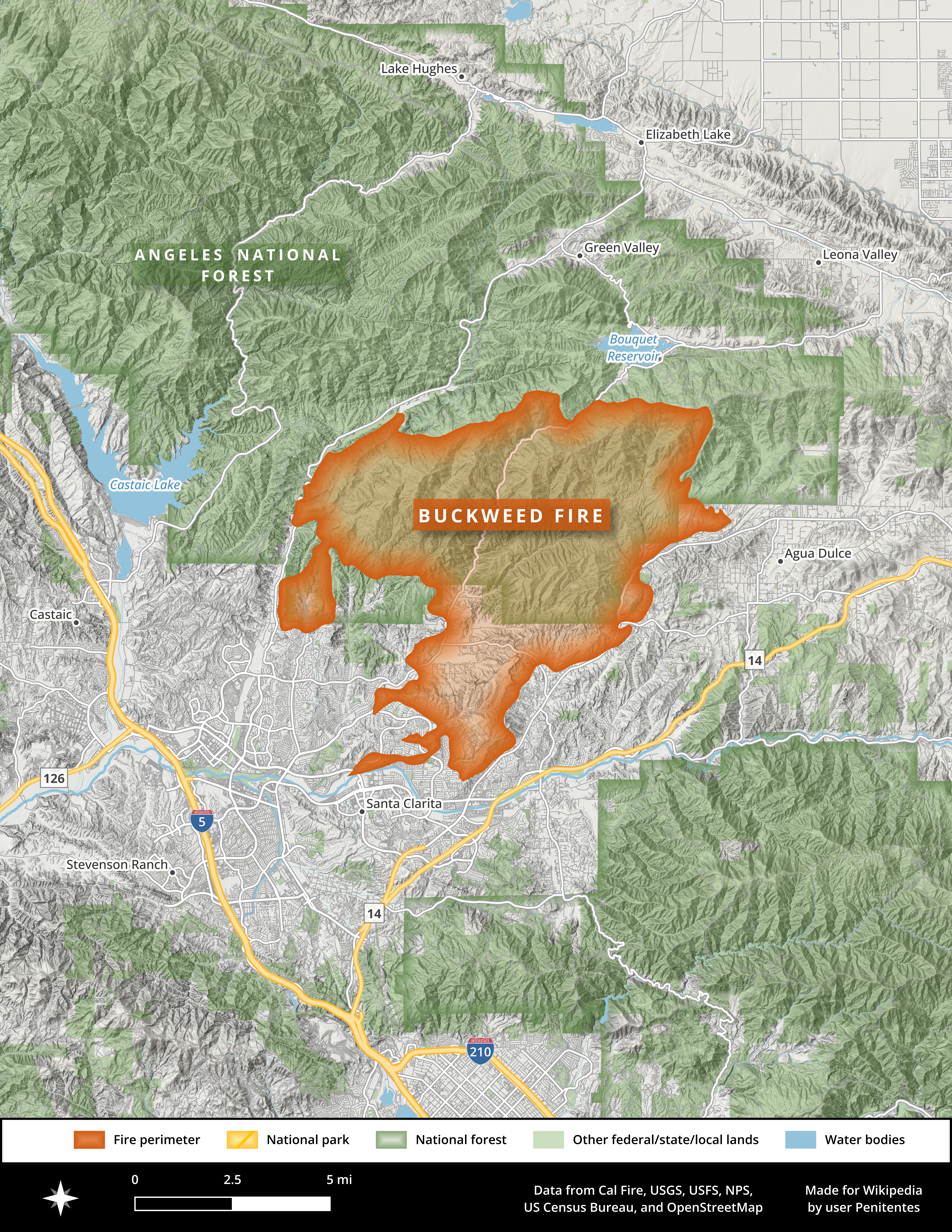
- The Buckweed Fire burned westward from Agua Dulce
- Date: October 21 –; October 26, 2007; (5 days)
- Location: Los Angeles County, Southern California, United States
- Coordinates: 34.513°N 118.339°W

Statistics
- Burned area: 38,356 acres (15,522 ha; 60 sq mi; 155 km^{2})

Impacts
- Injuries: 5
- Structures destroyed: 63 (30 damaged)

Map
- The general location of the Buckweed Fire in Los Angeles County

The Buckweed Fire was a large wildfire in Los Angeles County, Southern California, in late October of 2007. The fire was unintentionally ignited on October 21 by a ten-year-old boy playing with matches, and Santa Ana winds drove the fire as it burned 38,356 acres (15,522 hectares) over the course of six days until firefighters completely contained it on October 26. Dozens of buildings were destroyed.

== Background ==
The 2007 fire season in California saw 6,043 wildfires burn a combined total of 1,520,362 acres (615,269 ha). The Buckweed Fire was the eighth-largest wildfire of the year. Plentiful rain in 2004–2005 in Southern California promoted vegetation growth, which was then desiccated by drought in 2006–2007. By autumn of 2007, the region had "an extremely high, dry fuel load" as it entered a period of "extra-large, long-lasting Santa Ana [winds]", according to JPL climatologist Bill Patzert.

Santa Ana winds are a regular meteorological phenomenon in the autumn and winter in Southern California. They are generated when a high-pressure system builds in the Great Basin and pushes air clockwise and therefore downwards from the northeast into the Los Angeles Basin. During the episode of Santa Ana winds towards the end of October 2007, air was also drawn towards a low-pressure system over the Pacific Ocean. The airmass warmed and dried as it descended, and accelerated as it was forced through gaps in mountains or over ridges, creating strong downslope winds.

== Progression ==
The Buckweed Fire ignited at 12:45 p.m. on the 11700 block of West Mint Canyon Road in Agua Dulce, just outside the property of Carousel Ranch, a horse ranch that provided therapy to children with handicaps. The ranch was closed but a volunteer working inside the ranch building noticed the fire and promptly called 911.

The fire grew quickly, aided by 80-mile-per-hour (130 km/h) winds, and entered Bouquet Canyon and the Canyon Country area. Evacuations were ordered for homes in the Bouquet Canyon Road area and then for the Whites Canyon Road area. By 7:00 p.m., the fire had traveled 10 miles (16 km) west. Firefighters moved the main incident command post five times to keep pace with the fire's growth.

The command post was eventually established at Central Park in Saugus, and up to 1,200 personnel were based there during the week of the Buckweed Fire. By the morning of Monday, October 22, the fire had burned 25,000 acres (10,000 ha) and was 10 percent contained. A Los Angeles County Fire Department spokesperson said the fire was the "No. 1 priority in the state". By sundown it was 20 percent contained.

On Tuesday, October 23, the fire had burned 37,800 acres (15,300 ha) was 27 percent contained. By 8:30 p.m. on Tuesday, the Buckweed Fire had burned 37,812 acres (15,302 ha) and was 80 percent contained. Twelve hundred firefighters were engaged with the fire.

A red flag warning remained in effect in the Santa Clarita Valley until Wednesday, October 24. On the night of the 24th, with 1,100 personnel engaged, the fire was 97 percent contained.

The Buckweed Fire was declared fully contained on Friday, October 26. The fire ultimately burned 38,356 acres (15,522 ha).

== Cause ==
The cause of the Buckweed Fire was initially thought to be downed power lines, but on October 23 Los Angeles County supervisor Mike Antonovich said that investigators were working to determine if the fire was a case of arson. A woman living at the Carousel Ranch said she saw neighbors of hers—a young boy and his parents—trying to put the fire out shortly after it began, and directed arson investigators towards their residence. The fire's start was traced to an area near the trailer the boy and his parents lived in. The boy was the son of one of the ranch caretakers.

Los Angeles County Sheriff’s Department investigators spoke with the boy—who was ten years told—on October 22, the day after the fire ignited. The boy admitted to having played with matches and thereby setting the fire. The investigators left him in his parents' custody while authorities considered whether to press charges. The Los Angeles County district attorney's office eventually declined to do so after determining that the ignition was accidental, there being "no evidence of intent on the part of the minor". Governor Schwarzenegger and the head of the Los Angeles County Fire Department both termed the fire's ignition an accident.

== Effects ==
The Buckweed Fire destroyed 63 buildings and damaged 30. At least 21 of the destroyed buildings were homes. Every building on the Heads Up Ranch on Bouquet Canyon Road was destroyed, as was the Santa Clara/Mojave Rivers Ranger District office building in the Angeles National Forest, and all of the vehicles and equipment at the station. Two bridges in Vasquez Canyon at Bouquet Canyon Road and Sierra Highway were destroyed. A total of forty vehicles were lost.

At least five people were injured: two firefighters and three civilians. Some of the injuries were severe. The Santa Clarita Valley Signal wrote on Wednesday, October 24 that the Los Angeles County coroner's office had reported no deaths, though the Los Angeles Times reported that a man died on October 23 from injuries sustained in a car accident while fleeing the fire. Reuters and The Sacramento Bee also both reported that a man died on October 23 from burns suffered in the fire; Reuters cited a Forest Service spokesperson.

At least 5,500 homes had been placed under mandatory evacuation orders, affecting roughly 15,000 people.

The fire forced the temporary closure of Acton-Agua Dulce Unified School District, Saugus Union School District, William S. Hart Union High School District, Castaic Union School District, Newhall School District, Sulphur Springs School District, as well as Trinity Classical Academy and Santa Clarita Christian School. Schools in the Santa Clarita Valley reopened on Wednesday, October 24.

Governor Schwarzenegger visited Saugus on October 23 during a statewide tour of areas affected by the rash of wildfires.

== See also ==
- Glossary of wildfire terms
- List of California wildfires
- Copper Fire
