= Valencia, Santa Clarita, California =

Neighborhood of Santa Clarita in Los Angeles County, California

Valencia
- Neighborhood of Santa Clarita
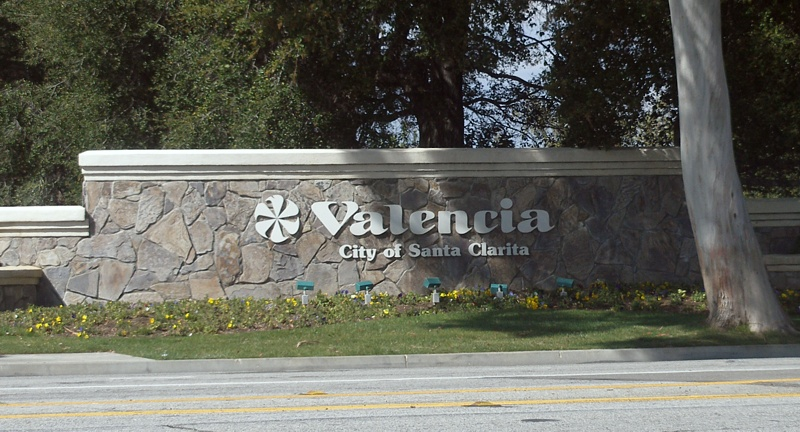
- Former welcome sign
- Nickname: Awesometown
- Position in the Santa Clarita Valley Valencia (the Los Angeles metropolitan area) Valencia (California)
- Coordinates: 34.42°N 118.56°W
- Country: United States
- State: California
- County: Los Angeles
- City: Santa Clarita
- Elevation: 1,125 ft (343 m)

Population (2019)
  - Total: 63,070
- Time zone: UTC-8 (Pacific (PST))
  - Summer (DST): UTC-7 (PDT)
- ZIP Code: 91354, 91355, 91385
- Area code: 661
- GNIS feature ID: 1661608
- Website: https://santaclarita.gov/

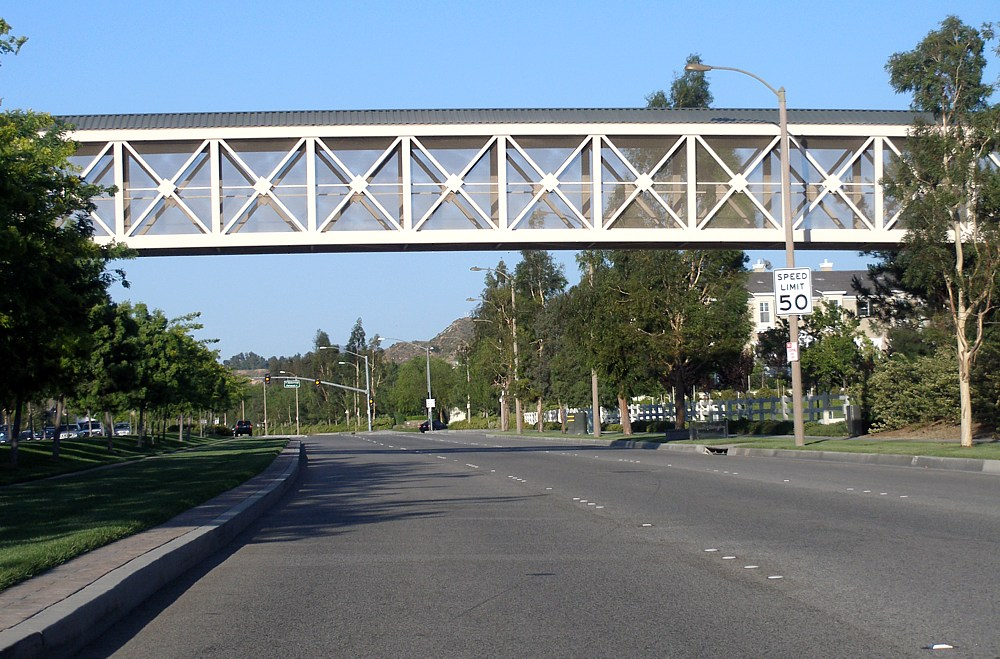
A typical stretch of Newhall Ranch Road, with a pedestrian bridge over the roadway.

Valencia is a neighborhood in Santa Clarita located within Los Angeles County, California. It is one of the four unincorporated communities (along with Saugus, Newhall, and Canyon Country) that merged to create the city of Santa Clarita in 1987. It is situated in the western part of Santa Clarita, stretching from Lyons Avenue to the south (on the border with Newhall) to north of Copper Hill Drive, and from Interstate 5 east to Bouquet Canyon and Seco Canyon Roads. Valencia was founded as a master-planned community with the first development, Old Orchard I, built on Lyons Avenue behind Old Orchard Elementary School.

== History ==
In 1769, the Spanish Portola expedition, the first Europeans to see inland areas of California, came up and over the pass from the San Fernando Valley and camped near the river on August 8–9. They found a large native village there and witnessed a wedding celebration. Fray Juan Crespi, a Franciscan missionary travelling with the expedition, named the river "Santa Clara" and noted in his diary that the place would be a good location for a mission. On the return trip, however, the party found a less strenuous trail through the Conejo Valley. Later travelers also preferred that route, and Mission San Fernando Rey de España was established down in the valley.

The master-planned portion of Valencia was first planned in the 1960s by the Newhall Land and Farming Company. The first subdivision to be constructed in Valencia was Old Orchard I, which opened in 1967, occupying an area bounded by Lyons Avenue, Orchard Village Road, and the South Fork of the Santa Clara River. The next subdivisions to open were Old Orchard II and Valencia Hills. Development continues to the present day and is nearing completion. Valencia is notable for its landscaped boulevards connecting a mix of apartment buildings, single-family detached homes, shopping centers, office parks and industrial warehouses.

On November 30, 2013, Paul Walker, best known for playing Brian O'Conner in the Fast & Furious films, died in a car crash in Hercules Street, Valencia.

== Community ==
Valencia is located along Interstate 5; all incorporated portions of Valencia are east of the freeway, while unincorporated portions are west of the freeway. Tesoro del Valle, the northernmost subdivision of Valencia, is outside the city limits although it is east of Interstate 5 and within the city's sphere of influence.

Valencia's residential areas are separated into villages, each with its own lifestyle (see List of Valencia, California residential villages). Almost all of Valencia's villages are close to schools, shopping, and other amenities. In many of the villages, homeowner associations oversee the quality and upkeep of housing developments ranging in size from a few dozen homes to over a thousand. Many villages also have a neighborhood watch program in force.

The major north–south thoroughfare in Valencia is McBean Parkway, which runs from Copper Hill Drive in the north to Stevenson Ranch in the southwest where it becomes Stevenson Ranch Parkway. McBean Parkway passes by such landmarks as Chesebrough, Heritage, and Summit Parks, Bridgeport Lake; Hyatt Regency Valencia; Westfield Valencia Town Center; Santa Clarita Valley Medical Plaza; Henry Mayo Newhall Memorial Hospital; and the California Institute of the Arts. Major east-west thoroughfares in Valencia (from north to south) include Copper Hill Drive, Decoro Drive, Newhall Ranch Road, Rye Canyon Road, Magic Mountain Parkway, Valencia Boulevard, McBean Parkway (which runs east–west from Orchard Village Road to I-5), Wiley Canyon Road, and Lyons Avenue.

Valencia contains most of the city's government buildings, hotels, car dealerships, medical centers, and corporate headquarters (see Economy section below). Eleven of the city's twelve tallest buildings are in Valencia; the two tallest are 24305 Town Center Drive (headquarters of Princess Cruises) and the Hyatt Regency Valencia, both of which are 72 feet (22 m) tall. The Santa Clarita city hall is located in Valencia, at 23920 Valencia Boulevard.

Valencia also has a system of paved pathways over or under the streets and boulevards, which are called paseos. They connect the entire community, making it possible to travel throughout nearly all of Valencia on foot or by bicycle without crossing a street at grade level. The paseo network is connected to the Santa Clara River Trail which runs east along the Santa Clara River to Canyon Country.

Valencia is split between two ZIP codes: the northern and eastern portions are in 91354, and the southern and western portions are in 91355.

== Demographics ==
As of the 2020 census, the population of Valencia was 63,670. 54.2% of residents were non-Hispanic white, 21.1% were Hispanic, 19.2% were Asian American, 4.8% were African American, and 2.3% were Native American.

== Education ==
At the elementary school level, northern Valencia is served by the Saugus Union School District, southern Valencia is served by the Newhall School District, and a small portion of western Valencia is served by the Castaic Union School District. The boundary between the Saugus and Newhall School Districts follows Valencia Boulevard (from The Old Road to Magic Mountain Parkway) and Magic Mountain Parkway (from Valencia Boulevard to Bouquet Canyon Road/Railroad Avenue).

Junior high and high school students in Valencia attend schools in the William S. Hart Union High School District. Valencia includes Rio Norte and Arroyo Seco Junior High Schools, and Valencia High School. Hart, Saugus, West Ranch, and Castaic High Schools; Placerita and Rancho Pico Junior High Schools; and Castaic Middle School also serve parts of Valencia. Castaic Middle School is part of the Castaic Union School District, not the Hart District.

Valencia is home to College of the Canyons, a community college, and California Institute of the Arts, an arts university.

== Attractions ==
Six Flags Magic Mountain is located in unincorporated Valencia. It includes 19 roller coasters, the most of any amusement park in the world.

The Valencia Town Center shopping mall is the primary commercial center of Valencia. It occupies an area bounded by Valencia Boulevard to the south, McBean Parkway to the west, Magic Mountain Parkway to the north, and Citrus Street to the east. It includes over 1,000,000 square feet (93,000 m^{2}) of retail space and contains 134 stores and 46 restaurants.

Valencia is home to an ice rink known as The Cube — Ice and Entertainment Center (formerly Ice Station Valencia). It is used for ice skating and hockey. In 2020, Ice Station Valencia was on the brink of permanent closure due to COVID-19, until the Santa Clarita city council unanimously voted to acquire the building for $14.2 million. On February 23, 2021, the city council sold Ice Station to American Sports Entertainment Company and the Los Angeles Kings. The city is currently in the process of renovating The Cube to include two large ice rinks (one NHL-size rink and one Olympic-sized rink) and one small ice rink known as The Pond. The rinks, covered with insulated floors, would double as venues for conventions, business meetings, concerts, birthday parties, and filming. The Cube opened on April 12, 2021, with a ribbon-cutting ceremony. The Cube is located on Smyth Drive, across the street from Valencia High School.

== Economy ==
Companies based in Valencia include Princess Cruises, Honda Performance Development, Precision Dynamics Corporation, condomman.com, Newhall Land and Farming Company, U.S. HealthWorks, and the American division of Advanced Bionics. Sunkist, Mechanix Wear, Remo, and WayForward are headquartered in unincorporated Valencia.

== Climate ==
Climate data for Valencia, Santa Clarita
Month	Jan	Feb	Mar	Apr	May	Jun	Jul	Aug	Sep	Oct	Nov	Dec	Year
Mean daily maximum °F (°C)	64 (18)	65 (18)	68 (20)	74 (23)	80 (27)	88 (31)	94 (34)	96 (36)	91 (33)	82 (28)	72 (22)	65 (18)	78 (26)
Mean daily minimum °F (°C)	38 (3)	38 (3)	39 (4)	42 (6)	47 (8)	51 (11)	55 (13)	56 (13)	53 (12)	47 (8)	41 (5)	37 (3)	45 (7)
Average precipitation inches (mm)	3.48 (88)	3.73 (95)	3.14 (80)	0.69 (18)	0.24 (6.1)	0.03 (0.76)	0.02 (0.51)	0.12 (3.0)	0.28 (7.1)	0.38 (9.7)	1.32 (34)	1.80 (46)	15.23 (387)

== Notable people ==
- Marielle Jaffe, actress and model
- Annett Davis, beach volleyball player
- Jeff Draheim, film editor
- Anthony Ervin, Olympic gold medalist swimmer
- Taylor Lautner, actor
- Dee Dee Myers
- Naya Rivera (1987–2020), actress
- Michael Trevino, actor
- Shane Vereen, professional football player
- Tamara Witmer, model
- Paul Walker (1973–2013), actor

== See also ==
- List of Valencia, California residential villages
