= City of Santa Clarita Transit =

Public transit agency serving the Santa Clarita Valley

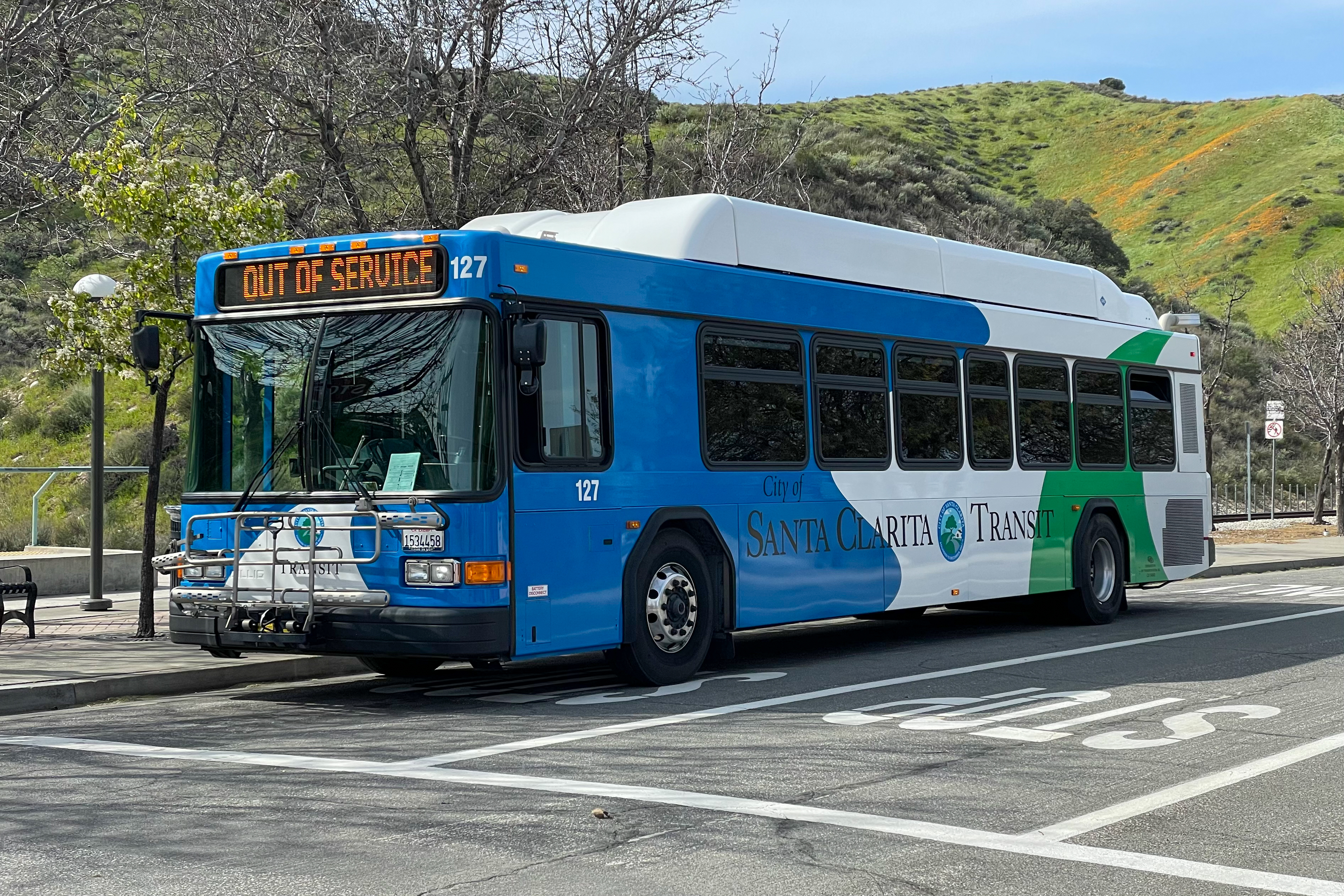
- City of Santa Clarita Transit bus at Santa Clarita station.
- Parent: City of Santa Clarita
- Founded: August 5, 1991
- Headquarters: Transit Maintenance Facility; 28250 Constellation Rd
- Locale: City of Santa Clarita; Los Angeles County
- Service type: Transit bus
- Routes: 38
- Hubs: McBean Regional Transit Center; Newhall station; Santa Clarita station
- Fleet: 109 buses
- Daily ridership: 8,300 (weekdays, Q2 2026)
- Annual ridership: 2,519,800 (2025)
- Fuel type: CNG, Diesel, Gasoline
- Operator: MV Transportation
- Website: Santa Clarita Transit

City of Santa Clarita Transit is a local bus service, administered by the City's transit division, that serves the City of Santa Clarita, California and nearby surrounding unincorporated areas. In 2025, the system had a ridership of 2,519,800, or about 8,300 per weekday as of the second quarter of 2026. Daily operations and maintenance of the fleet are under contract with MV Transportation. City of Santa Clarita Transit routes connect with services operated by Metro and Metrolink.

The Los Angeles County Department of Public Works contracts with City of Santa Clarita Transit to provide fixed route and Dial-A-Ride services in some unincorporated areas of Los Angeles County that are near the city limits of Santa Clarita. These areas include the communities of Castaic, Forest Park, Stevenson Ranch, Sunset Pointe, and Val Verde.

== History ==
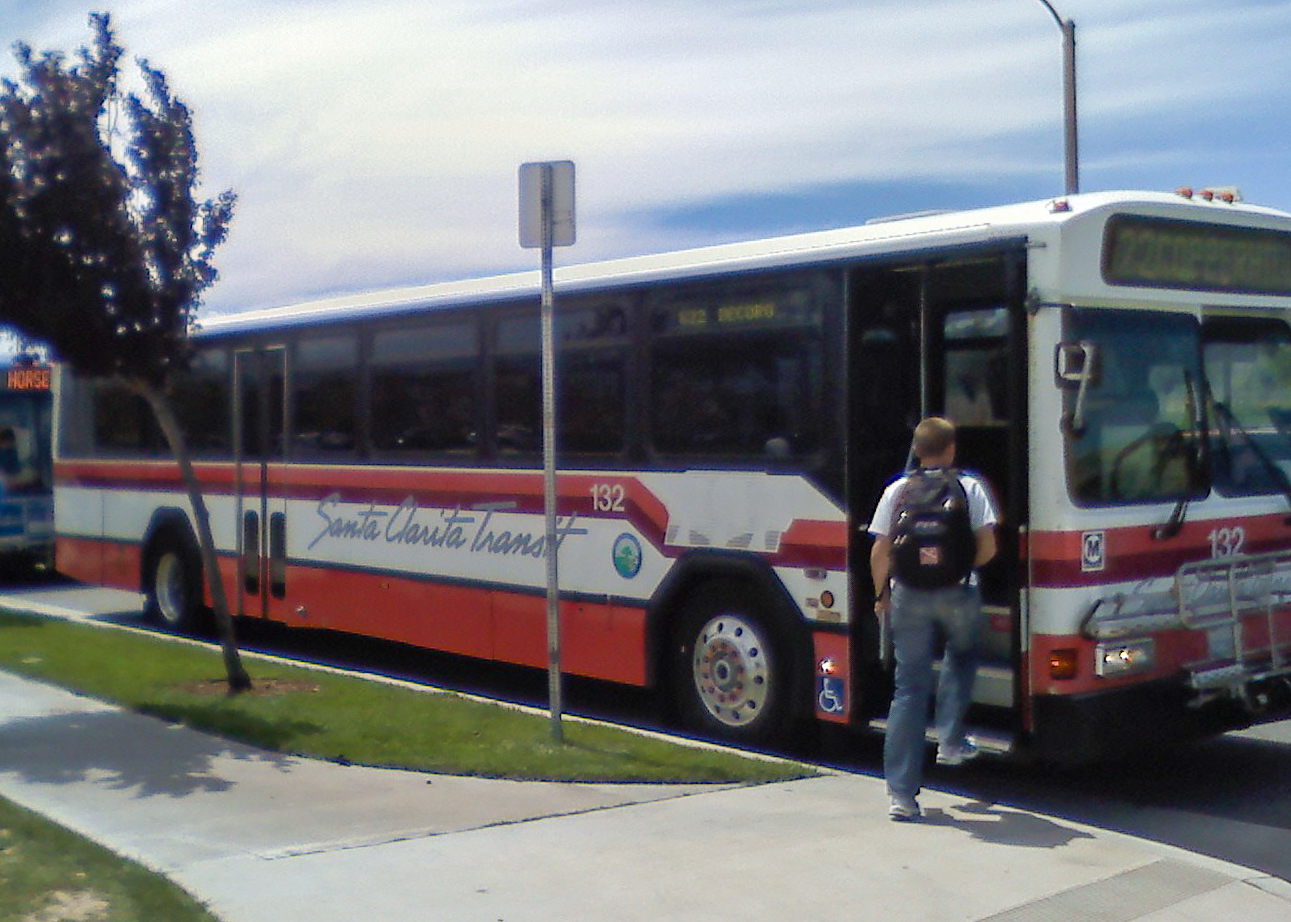
Santa Clarita Transit bus in the original 1991 livery

The City of Santa Clarita assumed responsibility for local transit in 1991 from Los Angeles County, which had developed an embryonic transit network. A small City staff provides supervision over a contract operator. Over time, the local fixed route network and dial-a-ride service was expanded. Under City management, a number of new regional express services to various points in the San Fernando Valley, West Los Angeles, Antelope Valley, and downtown Los Angeles were added or improved.

=== MV Transportation ===
In mid-2007 Santa Clarita Transit entered into a contract with MV Transportation and underwent a branding overhaul. The agency was renamed "City of Santa Clarita Transit" and buses received a new green and blue livery which reflect the colors of the city logo. The livery debuted in August 2007 on 2 brand new 60-foot (18 m) articulated buses. Also receiving an overhaul are the city's bus stops through a $2-million dollar Bus Stop Improvement Program. This included replacing 51 Clear Channel advertising shelters, benches, and trash cans. In addition, 40 additional stops will receive new non-advertising shelters, as well as a number of stops receiving new non-advertisement benches. An element of public art will be added to approximately 15 bus stops. The program's purpose is threefold, bus stops will become more uniform in look and features, the advertisement on benches will be eliminated, and public art will have a large expansion. The overhauls are major parts of the city's efforts to make transit more attractive to citizens.

Starting in 2010, City of Santa Clarita Transit began Summer Beach bus service to Santa Monica State Beach, from Canyon Country, and Newhall. Beginning in the 2023 Summer Season, the service exclusively services Ventura Harbor, starting and ending from Via Princessa station and stopping at the McBean Regional Transit Center in both directions. The beach bus is identified by route number, 103, only in operation from June to Labor Day in September, only on Saturdays and Sundays.

=== 2023 Transit Service Workers Strike ===
On September 15, 2023, after over a year of negotiations with MV Transportation, transit service workers represented by Teamsters Local 572 voted to go on strike until a fair contract is reached. MV Transportation was notified of the decision to strike on September 28.

The strike officially began on October 9, halting all bus and paratransit services across the city. The strike forced Santa Clarita Transit and William S. Hart High School District to negotiate an emergency contract with charter bus company Transit Systems in order to provide limited school tripper services to select schools and infrequent bus services along routes 1, 2, 5, 6, and 12. Santa Clarita City Council declined to enter into contract negotiations as a third party.

The strike ended on December 3rd, 2023. Teamsters Local 572 reached an agreement with MV Transportation. Buses returned to operation on December 4th, the strike lasted 55 days.

== Fixed-route Service ==
=== Local routes ===
Santa Clarita Transit operates 38 bus lines: 9 Local routes, 2 Station Link routes, 20 School Tripper routes, and 9 Commuter Express routes.

Route	Terminals		via	Notes
1	Castaic; Sloan Canyon Rd & The Old Rd	Santa Clarita; McBean Regional Transit Center	The Old Rd, Commerce Center Dr, Newhall Ranch Rd, McBean Plwy	Serves Valencia Commerce Center, Valencia Industrial Center and Valencia Town Center
2	Val Verde; Val Verde Park	Santa Clarita; McBean Regional Transit Center	Del Valle Rd, Chiquito Canyon Rd, Henry Mayo Dr, Newhall Ranch Rd, McBean Plwy	Serves Val Verde Park, Valencia Commerce Center, Valencia Industrial Center and Valencia Town Center
3	Valencia; Middleton St & Ramblewood St	Santa Clarita; Tamarack Ln & Seco Canyon Rd	Magic Mountain Pkwy, McBean Pkwy, Newhall Ranch Rd, Seco Canyon Rd	Serves Six Flags Magic Mountain, College of the Canyons, McBean Regional Transit Center and Valencia Town Center
4	Santa Clarita; LARC Ranch	Santa Clarita; Newhall station	Bouquet Canyon Rd, Tournament Rd, Lyons Ave	Serves Valencia Town Center, McBean Regional Transit Center, College of the Canyon and California Institute of the Arts
5	Stevenson Ranch; Faulkner Dr & Thurber Wy	Santa Clarita; Sierra Hwy & Vasquez Cyn Rd	The Old Rd, Lyons Ave, McBean Pkwy, Soledad Canyon Rd, Sierra Hwy	Serves Newhall station, McBean Regional Transit Center, Valencia Town Center, Santa Clarita station and College of the Canyons Canyon Country Campus
6	Stevenson Ranch; Faulkner Dr & Thurber Wy	Santa Clarita; Shadow Pines Bl & Grandifloras Rd	The Old Rd, Lyons Ave, McBean Pkwy, Soledad Canyon Rd	Serves Newhall station, McBean Regional Transit Center, Valencia Town Center, and Santa Clarita station
7	Valencia; Middleton St & Ramblewood St	Santa Clarita; Tamarack Ln & Seco Canyon Rd	Magic Mountain Pkwy, McBean Pkwy, Newhall Ranch Rd, Copper Hill Dr	Serves Six Flags Magic Mountain, College of the Canyons, McBean Regional Transit Center and Valencia Town Center
12	Santa Clarita; McBean Regional Transit Center	Santa Clarita; Heller Cir & Maitland Ln	Railroad Av, Sierra Hwy, Whites Canyon Rd	Selected trips serve the Via Princessa station; Serves Valencia Town Center and Newhall station
14	Santa Clarita; Heller Cir & Maitland Ln	Santa Clarita; Newhall station	Bouquet Canyon Rd, Tournament Rd, Lyons Av	Serves Saugus High School, Valencia Town Center, McBean Regional Transit Center, College of the Canyons, California Institute of the Arts, and Hart High School

=== Station Link routes ===
Station Link service provides service from the Santa Clarita station to local places of employment within the Santa Clarita Valley. Station Link service operates on weekdays peak periods (6-9am, 4-6pm) only except route 501, which as of February 2023, makes morning and afternoon trips excluding midday even on Saturdays and Sundays, select holidays included.

Route	Terminals		via	Notes
501	Santa Clarita; Santa Clarita station	Santa Clarita; Six Flags Magic Mountain Employee Gate	Valencia Bl, Tourney Rd, Magic Mountain Pkwy	Service operates in a loop beginning and ending at Santa Clarita station
502	Santa Clarita; Santa Clarita station	Castaic; Commerce Center Dr & Witherspoon Pkwy	Newhall Ranch Rd	Service operates in a loop beginning and ending at Santa Clarita station; Serves Valencia Industrial Center

=== School Tripper routes ===
Supplemental School Day Service routes (also known as Tripper Service), provide service to and from local Junior High and High Schools from residential areas. Supplemental School Day Service routes are numbered in the 600's. This service is only operated on weekdays when schools are in session. Trips are timed with school bell schedule.

Routes include:

- Route 620 – Arroyo Seco Jr. High School & Saugus High School
- Route 621 – Arroyo Seco Jr. High School & Saugus High School
- Route 622 – Rio Norte Jr. High School
- Route 623 – Rio Norte Jr. High School
- Route 624 – Valencia High School
- Route 626 – La Mesa Jr. High School
- Route 627 – La Mesa Jr. High School
- Route 628 – Golden Valley High School
- Route 629 – Golden Valley High School
- Route 632 – Canyon High School
- Route 633 – Saugus High School
- Route 634 – Rancho Pico Jr. High School & West Ranch High School
- Route 635 – Ranch Pico Jr. High School & West Ranch High School
- Route 636 – Valencia High School & West Ranch High School
- Route 637 – Arroyo Seco Jr. High School
- Route 638 – Arroyo Seco Jr. High School & Saugus High School
- Route 640 – Arroyo Seco Jr. High School & Saugus High School
- Route 641 – Placerita Jr. High School & Hart High School
- Route 643 – Arroyo Seco Jr. High School & Saugus High School
- Route 644 – La Mesa Jr. High School

=== Commuter Express routes ===
Commuter Express provides service to and from to major places of employment outside of the Santa Clarita Valley (Routes 796-799), and also provides service from areas outside of the Santa Clarita Valley to major places of employment inside the Santa Clarita Valley (Routes 791-794). All Commuter Express Routes run on weekdays only, except for Route 757, which runs seven days a week.

Route	Terminals		Via	Notes
757	Santa Clarita; McBean Regional Transit Center	North Hollywood; North Hollywood station	In Santa Clarita: Sierra Highway, Railroad Avenue, Valencia Boulevard, McBean Parkway (Weekdays only); Express Portion: I-5, CA-170 (Hollywood Freeway)	On weekdays service operates in a counter-clockwise loop in Santa Clarita making several stops, on weekends service operates directly to the McBean Regional Transit Center; Serves Newhall station on weekdays
791	Warner Center; Topanga Canyon Bl & Victory Bl	Santa Clarita; Technology Dr & Av Hall	In Santa Clarita: Avenue Scott, Valencia Boulevard, McBean Parkway; Express Portion: I-5, SR 118; In the San Fernando Valley: Topanga Canyon Boulevard	Serves Chatsworth station
792	Century City; Century Park West & Solar Wy	Santa Clarita; Av Stanford & Technology Dr	In Santa Clarita: Avenue Scott, Valencia Boulevard, McBean Parkway; Express Portion: I-5, I-405; In West LA: Westwood Boulevard, Wilshire Boulevard	Serves UCLA
794	Downtown LA; Los Angeles Union Station	Santa Clarita; Av Stanford & Technology Dr	In Santa Clarita: Avenue Scott, Valencia Boulevard, McBean Parkway; Express Portion: I-5	Serves Downtown Burbank station
796	Santa Clarita; Santa Clarita station	Warner Center; Victory Bl & Topanga Canyon Bl	In Santa Clarita: Valencia Boulevard, Orchard Village Road, Newhall Avenue; Express Portion: Sierra Highway, I-5, SR 118; In the San Fernando Valley: De Soto Avenue	Serves Newhall station and Chatsworth station
797	Santa Clarita; Santa Clarita station	Century City; Century Park West & Solar Wy	In Santa Clarita: Valencia Boulevard, Orchard Village Road, Newhall Avenue; Express Portion: I-5, I-405; In West LA: Westwood Boulevard, Wilshire Boulevard	Serves Newhall station and UCLA
799	Santa Clarita; Santa Clarita station	Downtown LA; 8th St & Spring St	In Santa Clarita: Valencia Boulevard, Orchard Village Road, Newhall Avenue; Express Portion: I-5; In Downtown LA: Alameda Street, 1st Street, Hope Street	

== Transfer Stations ==
- McBean Regional Transit Center
- Santa Clarita station
- Newhall station
- Via Princessa station
- Vista Canyon Multi-Modal Center (Future)
- North Hollywood station (757)
- Chatsworth Metrolink station (791)
- Downtown Burbank station (794)
- Union Station (Los Angeles) (794)

== Fleet ==
City of Santa Clarita Transit is housed in the city's Transit Maintenance Facility. The facility has been gold LEED certified.

=== Active fleet ===
Make/Model	Fleet numbers	Thumbnail	Year	Notes
Hometown Manufacturing Villager	100		2017	Only used for events
Optima AH–28	101		2006	Only used for events; Runs on Diesel; Ex–Greater Bridgeport Transit Authority
Gillig Low Floor CNG 40'	102–104, 106–112		2013	On November 6, 2017, Bus 102 was totaled in a fatal multi-vehicle accident on Sierra Highway
Gillig Low Floor CNG 40'	113–123		2014	
Gillig Low Floor CNG 40'	124–127		2018	
Gillig Low Floor CNG 40'	128–134		2019	
Gillig Low Floor CNG 40'	135–137		2020	
Gillig Low Floor CNG 40'	138–140		2020	On Wednesday morning May 13, 2026, Bus 139 was involved in a collision with a big rig truck. Bus 139 heavy front-end damage.
Gillig Low Floor CNG 40'	146–149		2022	
Gillig Low Floor CNG 40'	150–151		2023	
Gillig Low Floor CNG 40'	154-155, 158		2024	
Gillig Low Floor CNG 29'	142–145		2021	
Gillig Low Floor CNG 29'	152–153		2023	
Gillig Low Floor CNG 29'	156-157		2024	
NABI 60-BRT CNG	177–178		2007	Used for School Tripper routes
MCI D4500CT CNG	259–264		2013	Used for Commuter Express routes
MCI D4500CT CNG	265–269		2015	Used for Commuter Express routes
MCI D4500CT CNG	270–279		2017	Used for Commuter Express routes
MCI D4500CT CNG	280–282		2018	Used for Commuter Express routes
MCI D4500CT CNG	283–284		2020	Used for Commuter Express routes
MCI D4500CT CNG	285–286		2022	Used for Commuter Express routes
MCI D4500CT CNG	287–288		2023	Used for Commuter Express routes
Glaval Bus	368–371		2012	Used for Dial–a–Ride services
Glaval Bus	372–389		2017	Used for Dial–a–Ride services

=== Future fleet ===
The City of Santa Clarita has placed an order for seven hydrogen powered New Flyer XHE40's which are expected to be delivered by the end of 2025.
