= List of Valencia, California residential villages =

List of villages in Valencia, Santa Clarita, California

Valencia is a master-planned community located in the Santa Clarita Valley of Los Angeles County, California. It lies mostly within the city limits of Santa Clarita (see Valencia, Santa Clarita, California), although some parts extend into unincorporated Los Angeles County (see Valencia, California). Valencia is divided into several residential subdivisions, or "villages."

== Villages ==
River Village and Villa Metro were developed by the Newhall Land and Farming Company and have "Valencia" on their entrance signs, however they are east of Valencia proper and often considered part of Saugus.

- Alta Vista - single-family homes and townhomes adjacent to Valencia High School.
- Arbor Park
- Arroyo West
- Avignon
- Belcaro - Senior single-family homes.
- Bridgeport - Cape Cod style single-family and apartments homes surrounding an artificial lake.
- Brighton Village
- Bungalows - Bungalow / cottage style single-family homes.
- Central Valley
- Cheyenne - Small condo style living.
- Copperhill - An area with a mix of single family and apartment homes.
- Cornerstone - Condo and townhome community, across Decoro Drive from Valencia High School.
- Creekside - An area specially designed with the first-time home buyer in mind.
- Discovery
- Fairways - Duplex style homes next to the Vista Valencia Golf Course.
- FivePoint Valencia
- Franciscan Hill - Small condo style homes duplicating San Francisco style living.
- Heritage
- Lakeshore - Apartment style homes surrounding a lake. Located close to the Vista Valencia Golf Course.
- Las Ventanas
- Mayfair - Detached condominiums, cottage/bungalow style
- Meadows
- Montana
- Montecito
- North Park - a mix of apartment homes and single-family homes.
- North Valencia
- North Valley
- Northbridge - a large village containing mostly cottage / bungalow style single-family homes (no apartments or condos).
- Northbridge Point - A sequel to Northbridge, the two are next to each other and contain the same type of single-family homes.
- Northglen
- Old Orchard Condos
- Old Orchard I - Valencia's first village, contains single-family homes.
- Old Orchard II - A sequel to Old Orchard, contains single-family homes.
- Old Orchard III - A sequel to Old Orchard, contains single-family homes. Adjacent to Placerita Junior High School and Hart High School.
- Orchard Arms - Senior subsidized.
- Portofino - Condo style homes.
- Promenade at Town Center
- Provence - Apartment homes located in the North Park village.
- Riverwalk at Town Center
- River Village- new development currently in construction.
- Rose Arbor
- Santa Fe
- Sienna Villas
- Skycrest - Apartments
- South Valley
- Stone Creek
- Summit
- Tempo
- Tesoro del Valle
- Valencia Glen - Single-family homes, located north of the Old Orchard area.
- Valencia Hills
- Valencia Racquet Club - townhome community next to Arroyo Seco Junior High School.
- Valencia Villa - Senior subsidized.
- Village Homes North
- Village Walk - Condominiums, builder tagline: "Urban living in a suburban setting."
- Villa Metro - New Community of 315 contemporary Mediterranean styled single-family homes and townhomes, near the Santa Clarita Metrolink station.
- Vista Ridge
- Westridge - Containing large, single-family homes, duplexes and a golf-course. Includes West Ranch High School and Rancho Pico Junior High School. Sometimes considered part of Stevenson Ranch.
- West Creek / West Hills - large development (West Hills is gated) containing single-family homes and condominiums. West Creek includes Rio Norte Junior High School.
- Woodglen - Apartment homes located near CalArts and the Vista Valencia Golf Course.
- Woodlands - Gated community with a variety of home sizes and styles near Interstate 5 and Valencia Boulevard.

These are tracts. The Santa Clarita Valley is made up of several communities (Valencia, Stevenson Ranch, Saugus, Newhall, Castaic, Val Verde and Canyon Country). Each of these areas have hundreds of tracts with various floorplans.
