= McBean Regional Transit Center =

Transit center in Santa Clarita, California

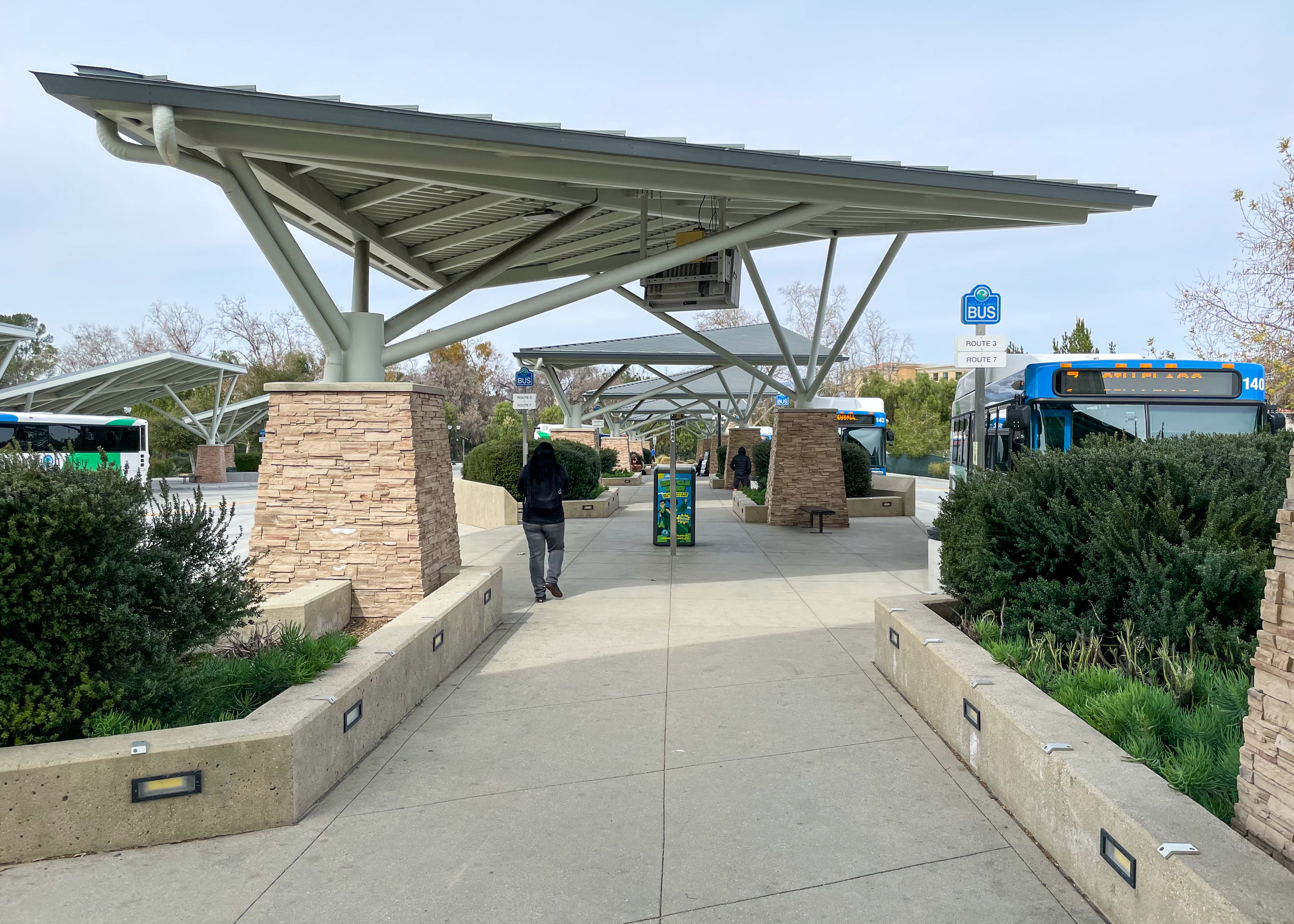
- Boarding island at McBean Regional Transit Center

General information
- Location: 24375 Valencia Boulevard; Santa Clarita, California
- Coordinates: 34.4140°N 118.5620°W
- Owner: City of Santa Clarita Transit
- Bus routes: City of Santa Clarita Transit: 1, 2, 3, 4, 5, 6, 7, 12, 14, 501, 636, 757, 791, 792, 794, 796, 797, 799
- Bus stands: 17

Construction
- Parking: 289 spaces
- Cycle facilities: 10 covered racks
- Accessible: Yes

History
- Opened: January 20, 2002
- Rebuilt: 2013
Location
- Location within Santa Clarita

McBean Regional Transit Center, also known by its acronym MRTC, is a transit center and bus station located at 24375 Valencia Boulevard in the Valencia area of Santa Clarita, California, near the intersection of Valencia Boulevard and McBean Parkway. It is located next to the Westfield Valencia Town Center.

The facility opened on January 20, 2002, with 12 bus stands. It was significantly expanded in 2013 adding five additional bus stands and a 289 space park and ride lot.

== Bus service ==
The McBean Regional Transit Center is the primary hub for City of Santa Clarita Transit. Routes 1, 2, 3, 4, 5, 6, 7, 12, 14, 501, and 636 serve this station.

Additionally, route 757 "NoHo Express" offers daily service between Santa Clarita and North Hollywood station, allowing riders to connect to several Los Angeles Metro services including the B Line subway and the G Line bus rapid transit routes.

On weekdays, commuter buses operate between Santa Clarita and various locations. Routes 791 and 796 serve Chatsworth, Canoga Park, Woodland Hills and Warner Center. Routes 792 and 797 serve Century City, UCLA and Westwood. Routes 794 and 799 serve Downtown Los Angeles.

The station was formerly served by Kern Transit intercounty route 130, which operated between Santa Clarita and Bakersfield via Frazier Park and Grapevine. It was discontinued in late 2024

The facility includes 289 park and ride spaces, benches, and public restrooms.

== See also ==
- Vista Canyon Multi-Modal Center
