= Agua Dulce Airpark =

General aviation airport in Agua Dulce, California, United States

- IATA: none; ICAO: none; FAA LID: L70

Summary
- Airport type: Public
- Owner: Wayne & Connie Spears
- Location: Agua Dulce, California
- Opened: October 1958
- Elevation AMSL: 2,660 ft (810 m)
- Coordinates: 34°30′09″N 118°18′53″W
- Website: l70airport.com

Map
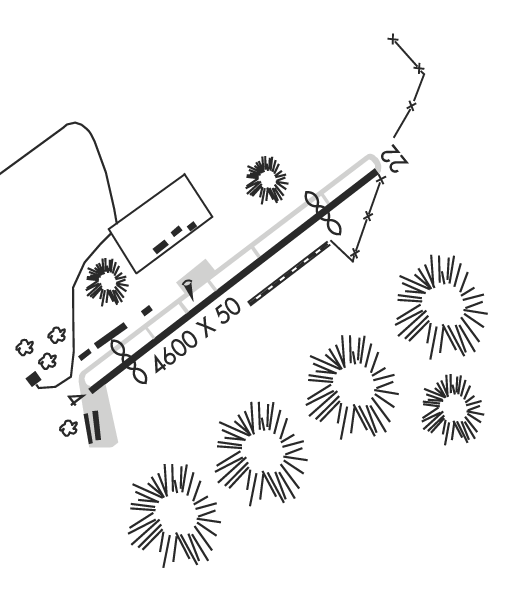
- FAA Airport Sketch

Runways
Direction	Length		Surface
Direction	ft	m	Surface
4/22	4,600	1,402	Asphalt

Statistics (2006)
- Aircraft operations: 2,880
- Source: FAA and airport website

Agua Dulce Airpark (FAA LID: L70), also known as Agua Dulce Airport, is a public-use airport located 2 miles (3.2 km) east of the central business district of Agua Dulce, in Los Angeles County, California, United States.

The plans for an airport at Agua Dulce began in 1958. Aircraft modification engineer Robert W. Lillibridge and Northrop test pilot Errol Williams purchased the vacant acreage for the airport. The costs of subsequent improvements were financed by millionaire businessman Jim Annin. A special permit to begin building was required. On October 27, 1959, special permit case No. 1404-(5) was granted by the Regional Planning Commission of Los Angeles County. In the 1990s, local residents fought an attempt by Los Angeles County to buy the airpark and convert it to a regional airport. In October 2005, former airport owner Barry Kirschner sold the property to Wayne and Connie Spears, owners of Spears Manufacturing and Spears Motorsports.

== Facilities and aircraft ==
Agua Dulce Airpark covers an area of 108 acres (44 ha) which contains one asphalt paved runway (4/22) measuring 4,600 x 50 ft (1,402 x 15 m). For the 12-month period ending May 15, 2006, the airport had 2,880 aircraft operations: 62% transient general aviation and 38% local general aviation.

== In popular culture ==
The airport has been used as a filming location for projects including:

- The 1983 video for the "Weird Al" Yankovic song "I Love Rocky Road" was filmed at this airport.
- The Macgyver TV series used the airport as the "Sparrow Ridge Airport", Arizona, in Season 1, episode 7, "Last Stand" (1985).
- In the 1989 film The Wizard, the Power Glove scene was filmed at the airport.
- For the 1997 film Fire Down Below, a gas station/minimart set was built on the runway.
- The Roswell TV series used this in at least five episodes, over three seasons (1999–2002): the gas station and the cafe exterior in season 1, the airport as a background and the interior of the cafe in season 2, and the hill that faces the runway in season 3. The view in the distance was used as a distant shot of the town of Roswell in promotional materials.
- The final act of the 200th episode of the TV series Bones (Season 10, 2014) was filmed at the airport.
- Ford v Ferrari, the 2019 film, built a structure to represent the grandstands and the pits at Le Mans.
- NCIS episode "Her" (Season 23: episode 10) filmed the closing segment of Bishop's departure.
