= Mechanix Wear =

American glove manufacturer and safety company

Mechanix Wear, Inc.
- Type: Private
- Industry: Automotive, Industrial, Tactical, Hardware
- Founded: 1991
- Headquarters: Valencia, California, United States
- Number of locations: 1
- Area served: United States; Canada; Europe
- Key people: James Hale, Founder
- Products: High Performance Gloves
- Number of employees: 90
- Subsidiaries: Ethel Gloves
- Website: https://www.mechanix.com

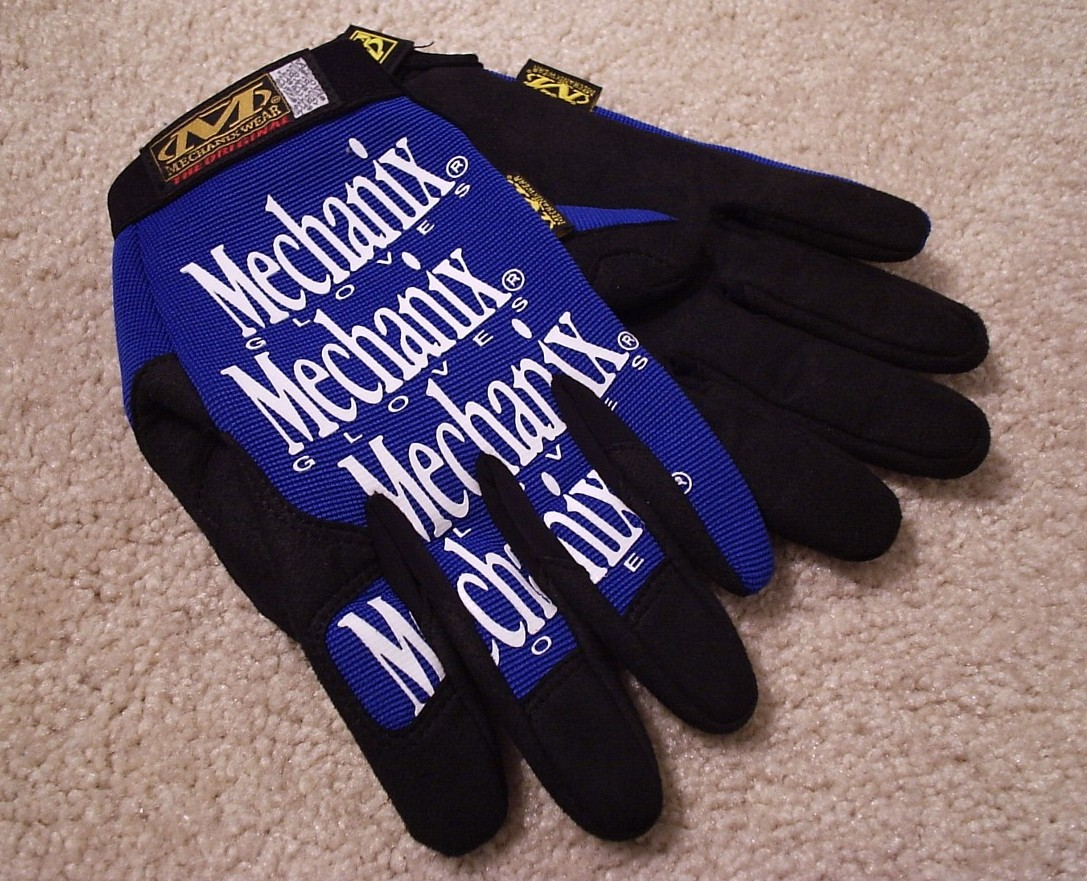
A pair of Mechanix Wear Original gloves

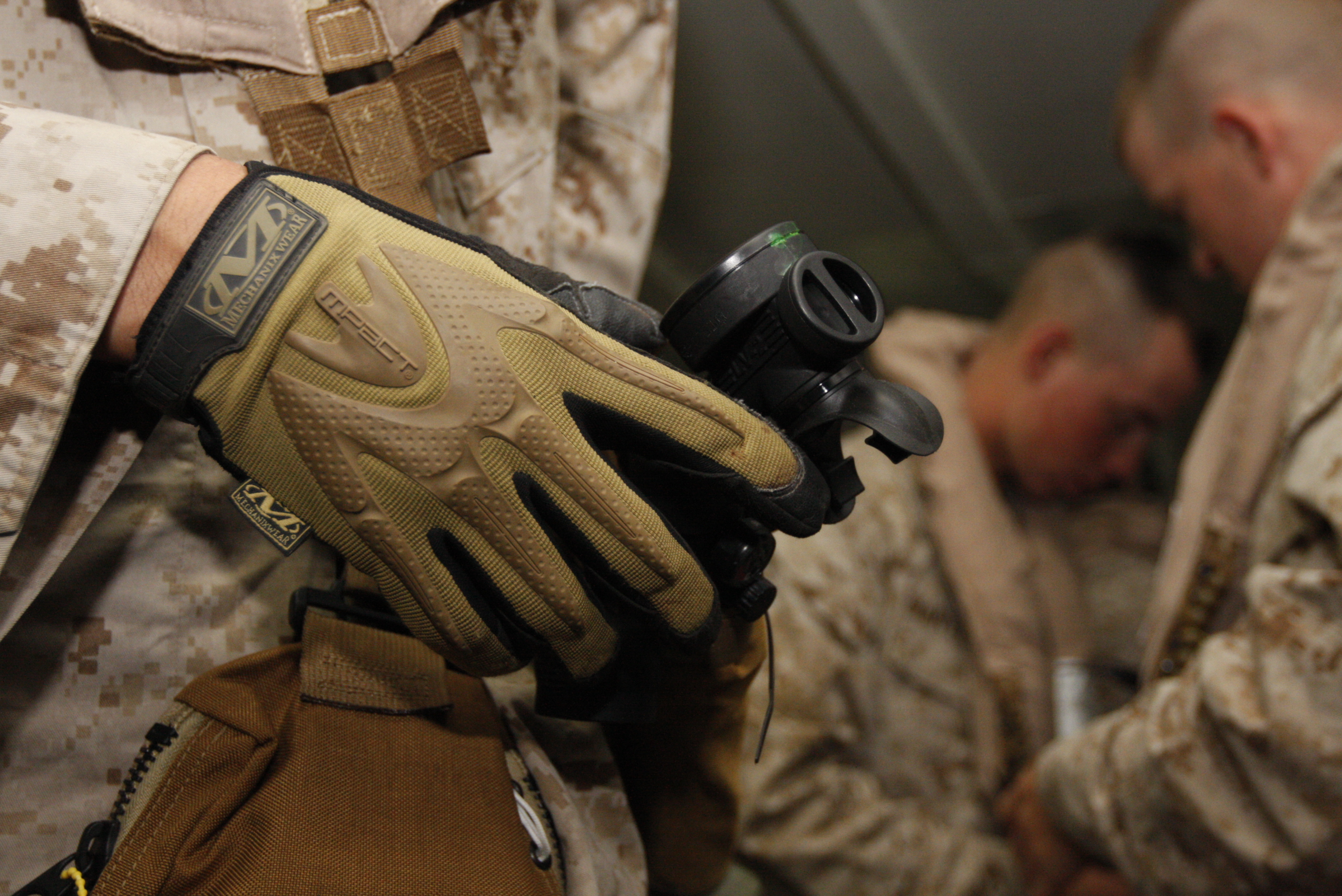
United States Marine Corps rifleman with Mechanix Wear gloves

Mechanix Wear, Inc. is an American safety company headquartered in Valencia, California, that produces high performance work gloves in the automotive, industrial, tactical and construction segments.

== Partnership ==
On 14 July 2020, NASCAR and Mechanix Wear LLC announced a multi-year agreement that will continue to recognize the company as an approved affiliate of NASCAR.

In September 2020, Mechanix Wear partnered with DuPont Personal Protection to enhance its glove technology.

== Motorsports involvement ==
=== NASCAR ===
"The Original" Mechanix Wear gloves were first used in NASCAR during the 1991 Daytona 500 by the Richard Childress Racing Number 3 GM Goodwrench team. The company later became a team product supplier, contingency sponsor, NASCAR officials' product supplier, NASCAR aftermarket licensee and year-end Most Valuable Pit Crew award sponsor.

==== Most Valuable Pit Crew of the Year Award ====
In 2002, Mechanix Wear began sponsoring the "Mechanix Wear Most Valuable Pit Crew" award. The NASCAR year-end MVPC award is determined by a vote of all NASCAR Nextel Cup crew chiefs. Past winners include:

- 2002: #40 team – Chip Ganassi Racing
- 2003: #17 team – Roush Racing
- 2004: #48 team – Hendrick Motorsports
- 2005: #20 team – Joe Gibbs Racing
- 2006: #31 team – Richard Childress Racing
- 2007: #48 team - Hendrick Motorsports
- 2008: #48 team - Hendrick Motorsports
- 2009: #42 team - Earnhardt Ganassi Racing
- 2010: #11 team - Joe Gibbs Racing
- 2011: #99 team - Roush Fenway Racing
- 2012: #56 team - Michael Waltrip Racing
- 2013: #88 team - Hendrick Motorsports
- 2014: #4 team - Stewart–Haas Racing
- 2015: #41 team - Stewart–Haas Racing
- 2016: #48 team - Hendrick Motorsports
