= Hasley Canyon, California =

- Unincorporated community Census designated place
- Location of Hasley Canyon in Los Angeles County, California.

- Position in California
- Coordinates: 34°28′54″N 118°40′00″W
- Country: United States
- State: California
- County: Los Angeles

Area
  - Total: 5.741 sq mi (14.869 km^{2})
  - Land: 5.739 sq mi (14.865 km^{2})
  - Water: 0.0012 sq mi (0.003 km^{2}) 0.02%
- Elevation: 1,765 ft (538 m)

Population (2020)
  - Total: 1,195
  - Density: 208.2/sq mi (80.39/km^{2})
- Time zone: UTC-8 (Pacific (PST))
  - Summer (DST): UTC-7 (PDT)
- GNIS feature ID: 2583032

Hasley Canyon is a census-designated place in the southeastern Topatopa Mountains foothills, and is in northwestern Los Angeles County, California, United States. Hasley Canyon sits at an elevation of 1,765 feet (538 m). The 2020 United States census reported Hasley Canyon's population was 1,195, up from 1,137 at the 2010 census.

== Geography ==
According to the United States Census Bureau, the CDP has a total area of 5.7 square miles (14.9 km^{2}), over 99% of which is land.

== Demographics ==
Historical population
Census	Pop.	Note	%±
2010	1,137		—
2020	1,195		5.1%
U.S. Decennial Census; 2000 2010; 2020

Hasley Canyon first appeared as a census designated place in the 2010 U.S. census.

=== Racial and ethnic composition ===
Hasley Canyon CDP, California – Racial and ethnic composition Note: the US Census treats Hispanic/Latino as an ethnic category. This table excludes Latinos from the racial categories and assigns them to a separate category. Hispanics/Latinos may be of any race.
Race / Ethnicity (NH = Non-Hispanic)	Pop 2010	Pop 2020	% 2010	% 2020
White alone (NH)	825	746	72.56%	62.43%
Black or African American alone (NH)	15	9	1.32%	0.75%
Native American or Alaska Native alone (NH)	2	2	0.18%	0.17%
Asian alone (NH)	20	12	1.76%	1.00%
Native Hawaiian or Pacific Islander alone (NH)	1	1	0.09%	0.08%
Other race alone (NH)	0	2	0.00%	0.17%
Mixed race or Multiracial (NH)	30	56	2.64%	4.69%
Hispanic or Latino (any race)	244	367	21.46%	30.71%
Total	1,137	1,195	100.00%	100.00%

=== 2020 census ===
As of the 2020 census, Hasley Canyon had a population of 1,195. The population density was 208.2 inhabitants per square mile (80.4/km^{2}). 0.0% of residents lived in urban areas, while 100.0% lived in rural areas.

The racial makeup of Hasley Canyon was 820 (68.6%) White, 9 (0.8%) African American, 21 (1.8%) Native American, 13 (1.1%) Asian, 1 (0.1%) Pacific Islander, 166 (13.9%) from other races, and 165 (13.8%) from two or more races. Hispanic or Latino of any race were 367 persons (30.7%).

The age distribution was 246 people (20.6%) under the age of 18, 95 people (7.9%) aged 18 to 24, 240 people (20.1%) aged 25 to 44, 414 people (34.6%) aged 45 to 64, and 200 people (16.7%) who were 65 years of age or older. The median age was 46.1 years. For every 100 females, there were 105.3 males, and for every 100 females age 18 and over there were 105.4 males age 18 and over.

The whole population lived in households. There were 381 households, out of which 122 (32.0%) had children under the age of 18 living in them, 230 (60.4%) were married-couple households, 24 (6.3%) were cohabiting couple households, 74 (19.4%) had a female householder with no spouse or partner present, and 53 (13.9%) had a male householder with no spouse or partner present. 46 households (12.1%) were one person, and 26 (6.8%) were one person aged 65 or older. The average household size was 3.14. There were 321 families (84.3% of all households).

There were 420 housing units at an average density of 73.2 units per square mile (28.3 units/km^{2}), of which 381 (90.7%) were occupied. Of these, 314 (82.4%) were owner-occupied, and 67 (17.6%) were occupied by renters. The vacancy rate was 9.3%, including a homeowner vacancy rate of 0.3% and a rental vacancy rate of 5.6%.

=== Income and poverty ===
In 2023, the US Census Bureau estimated that the median household income in 2023 was $120,714, and the per capita income was $45,395. About 8.1% of families and 9.4% of the population were below the poverty line.

== Education ==
Hasley Canyon is served by the Castaic Union School District (elementary school) and by the William S. Hart Union High School District.
