= Newhall station =

Train station in Santa Clarita, California, US

Newhall
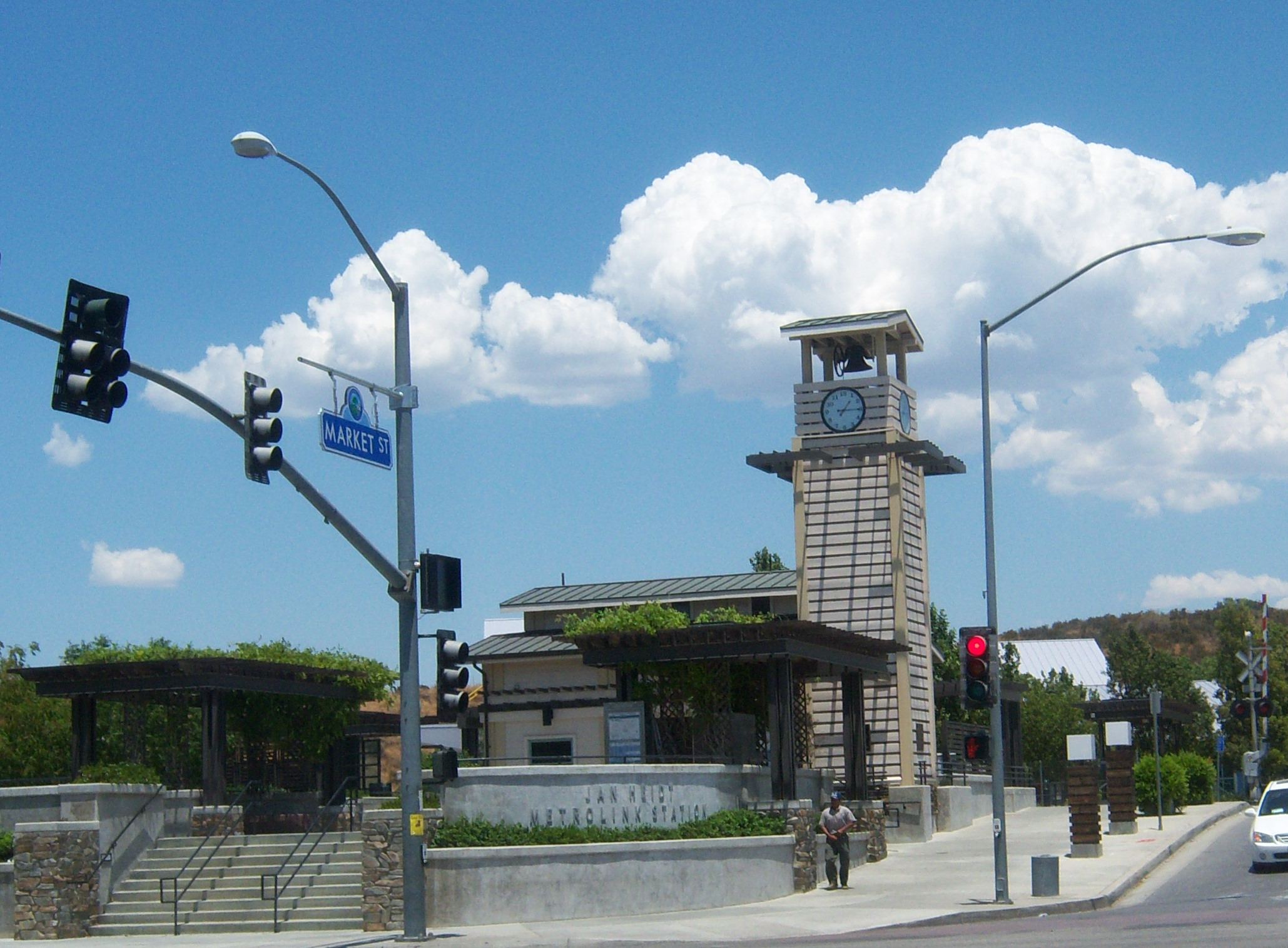
- Exterior of the Newhall station

General information
- Other names: Jan Heidt Newhall Metrolink Station
- Location: 24300 Railroad Avenue; Santa Clarita, California; United States
- Coordinates: 34°22′44″N 118°31′37″W
- Owner: City of Santa Clarita
- Line: SCRRA Valley Subdivision
- Platforms: 2 side platforms
- Tracks: 2
- Connections: Amtrak Thruway: 1C, 1; Antelope Valley Transit Authority: 790; City of Santa Clarita Transit: 4, 5, 6, 12, 14, 757, 796, 797, 799

Construction
- Parking: 324 spaces, 17 accessible spaces
- Cycle facilities: Racks, 22 lockers
- Accessible: Yes

Other information
- Station code: Amtrak: NHL

History
- Opened: March 18, 2000

Passengers
- FY 2026: 278 (avg. wkdy boardings)

Services
Preceding station	Metrolink	Following station
Santa Clarita toward Lancaster	Antelope Valley Line	Sylmar/San Fernando toward L.A. Union Station
Location

Newhall station is an intermodal hub in the Newhall neighborhood of Santa Clarita, California. The station is served by Metrolink's Antelope Valley Line operating between Los Angeles Union Station and Lancaster, Amtrak Thruway buses connecting to/from Gold Runner trains in Bakersfield, and serves as a transfer point in the City of Santa Clarita Transit bus system.

Newhall was built as an infill station on the busy Antelope Valley Line and opened on March 18, 2000. The official name of the station is Jan Heidt Newhall Metrolink Station in honor of Jan Heidt, one of the original members of the Santa Clarita city council.

Newhall station is served by 30 Metrolink Antelope Valley Line trains (15 in each direction) each weekday. Weekend service consists of 24 trains (12 in each direction) on both Saturday and Sunday. On all days, trains are evenly spaced throughout the day.

== Connections ==
=== City of Santa Clarita Transit ===
The station serves as a major transfer station for City of Santa Clarita Transit routes:

- Local: 4, 5, 6, 12, 14
- Commuter Express: 757, 796, 797, 799

=== Amtrak Thruway ===
Amtrak Thruway buses offer connections between Newhall station and Gold Runner trains to Oakland and Sacramento through route 1C buses that travel to/from the Bakersfield station. Amtrak also allows city-to-city bus travel to Southern California destinations on Route 1C. During the overnight hours, when Gold Runner trains aren't running, route 1 buses serve Newhall station.

- Route 1C: Bakersfield – Hollywood Burbank Airport – Van Nuys – UCLA – Santa Monica
- Route 1: San Diego – Santa Ana – Los Angeles – Bakersfield (limited late-night service)

=== Antelope Valley Transit Authority ===
Newhall serves as the connection point to the Antelope Valley Transit Authority route 790, the North County TRANSporter. The route allows Metrolink passengers on mid-day trains (that only go as far as the Santa Clarita Valley) to travel to the Palmdale station.

== See also ==
- McBean Regional Transit Center
- Santa Clara River Trail
- Lang Southern Pacific Station, a California Historic Landmark
