= Saugus Union School District =

School district in California, United States

Coordinates: 34.4391°N 118.5719°W

Location
- 24930 Avenue Stanford; Santa Clarita, CA 91355 United States

District information
- Type: Public
- Grades: K–6
- Established: 1908
- Superintendent: Colleen Hawkins
- NCES District ID: 0635970

Students and staff
- Students: 9,170 (2021–2022)
- Teachers: 348.32 (FTE)
- Staff: 423.00 (FTE)
- Student–teacher ratio: 26.33:1

Other information
- Website: www.saugususd.org

Saugus Union School District (SUSD) is a public California school district located in Santa Clarita, Los Angeles County, California. The district serves students in grades TK/K-6 in Saugus, most of Valencia, and parts of Canyon Country. There are also pre-school programs on-site at many of the schools. The district includes 15 elementary schools.

== History ==
The Saugus School District was founded on November 12, 1908, formed from sections of the older Newhall School District and Castaic Union School District. Construction of the district's first elementary school was put to bid on October 15, 1909.

=== Saugus Elementary School ===
Saugus Elementary School opened the following year in 1910, located on Bouquet Canyon Road between Cinema Drive and Springbook Avenue. The original wooden schoolhouse was demolished in 1936 to make way for a Spanish-style adobe building.

Saugus Elementary School closed in 1978 and was redeveloped into the "Santa Clarita Plaza" shopping center.

On August 2, 1978, the school's bell was placed in the custodial care of the Santa Clarita Valley Historical Society until its final placement within the belfry of the Newhall Metrolink station in 2000.

=== District growth ===
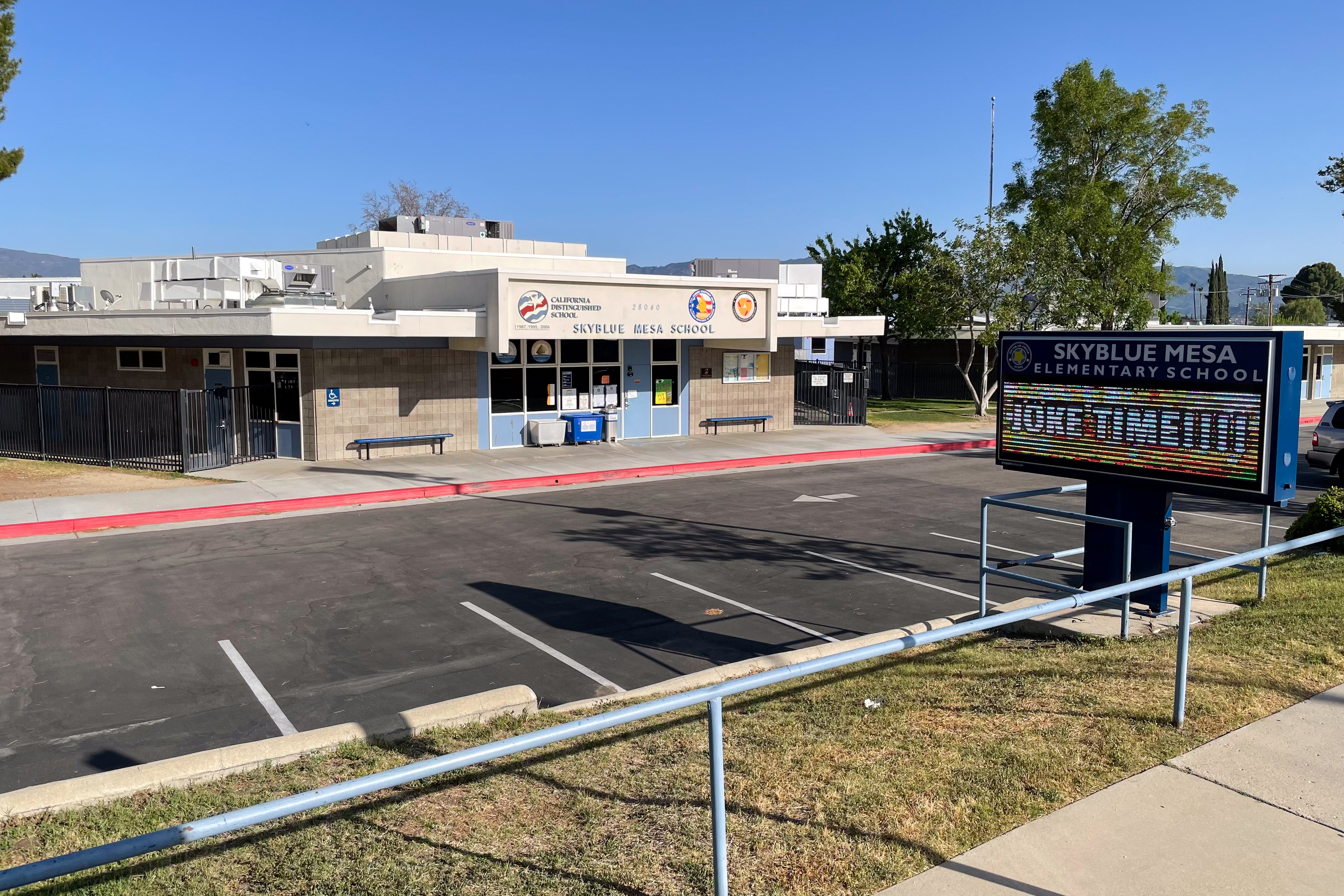
Skyblue Mesa Elementary School, April 2023

As Saugus grew, so to did the need for additional elementary schools.

Santa Clarita Elementary School opened in 1960, located 1.8 mi (2.9 km) north along Seco Creek. It's the only elementary school in the district whose original classrooms are located within a brick building resembling a roundhouse.

The temporary Jerome Snyder Elementary School was built to supplement the two existing schools in 1962 before the completion of Honby Elementary School in 1963. Bouquet Elementary School followed in 1966, which also served as the district headquarters until 1993. Cedarcreek Elementary School and Skyblue Mesa Elementary School also opened in 1966. Rosedell Elementary School opened in 1967.

The current district office in Valencia opened in 1993.

== Schools ==
All SUSD schools are within the city of Santa Clarita.

Saugus Union School District elementary schools
School	Address	Founded	Enrollment (2022–23)
Bridgeport Elementary	23670 Newhall Ranch Road, Santa Clarita, CA 91355	2002	803
Cedarcreek Elementary	27792 Camp Plenty Road, Santa Clarita, CA 91351	1966	375
Charles Helmers Elementary	27300 Grandview Drive, Santa Clarita, CA 91354	1990	452
Emblem Academy	22635 Espuella Drive, Santa Clarita, CA 91350	1968	756
Highlands Elementary	27332 Catala Avenue, Santa Clarita, CA 91350	1970	561
James Foster Elementary	22500 Pamplico Drive, Santa Clarita, CA 91350	1989	487
Mountainview Elementary	22201 Cypress Place, Santa Clarita, CA 91390	1996	934
North Park Elementary	23335 Sunset Hills Drive, Santa Clarita, CA 91354	1999	444
Plum Canyon Elementary	28360 Alfred Way, Santa Clarita, CA 91350	1998	812
Rio Vista Elementary	20417 Cedarcreek Street, Santa Clarita, CA 91351	1968	463
Rosedell Elementary	27853 Urbandale Avenue, Santa Clarita, CA 91350	1967	638
Santa Clarita Elementary	27177 Seco Canyon Road, Santa Clarita, CA 91350	1960	254
Skyblue Mesa Elementary	28040 Hardesty Avenue, Santa Clarita, CA 91351	1966	581
Tesoro del Valle Elementary	29171 Bernardo Way, Valencia, CA 91354	2005	511
West Creek Academy	28767 West Hills Drive, Santa Clarita, CA 91354	2010	1,024

=== Planned schools ===
- Entrada Elementary School - planned school in unincorporated Valencia near Six Flags Magic Mountain, serving the new FivePoint Valencia community.

=== Transferred schools ===
- Honby Elementary School - fourth school in the district's history, opening in 1963. Transferred to Sulphur Springs School District and renamed Canyon Springs Community School in 1991.
- Valley View Elementary School - opened 1972 and transferred to Sulphur Springs School District and renamed Valley View Community School in 1982.

=== Closed schools ===
- Saugus Elementary School - first school in the district's history, opening in 1908 and closing in 1978. The school's bell can now been seen in the bell tower of the Metrolink station in Newhall.
- Jerome Snyder Elementary School - temporary school that opened in 1962 and closed in 1966. The school consisted of eleven single-family houses on Bagby Drive, eight of which were used for classroom instruction and three of which were used for administrative purposes.
- Seco Canyon Elementary School - temporary school that opened in 1987 and closed in 1990.
- Bouquet Canyon Elementary School - modular school that opened in 1989 and closed in spring of 2010. In 2021, the school reopened as Rosedell Elementary School's north campus, accommodating Rosedell's fifth- and sixth-graders.SCV Elementary also closed in 2024 due to declining enrollment and not being up to the earthquake code

== Student demographics ==
As of the 2022–23 school year, 9,097 students were enrolled in Saugus District schools. 38.3% of students were Hispanic or Latino, 34.6% were non-Hispanic white, 9.6% were Asian American, 6.7% were Filipino, 6.6% were multiracial, 3.1% were African American, 0.2% were Indigenous American, and 0.1% were Pacific Islander.

== See also ==
- Castaic Union School District
- Newhall School District
- Sulphur Springs School District
- William S. Hart Union High School District
