= Santa Clarita station =

Train station in Santa Clarita, California, US

Santa Clarita
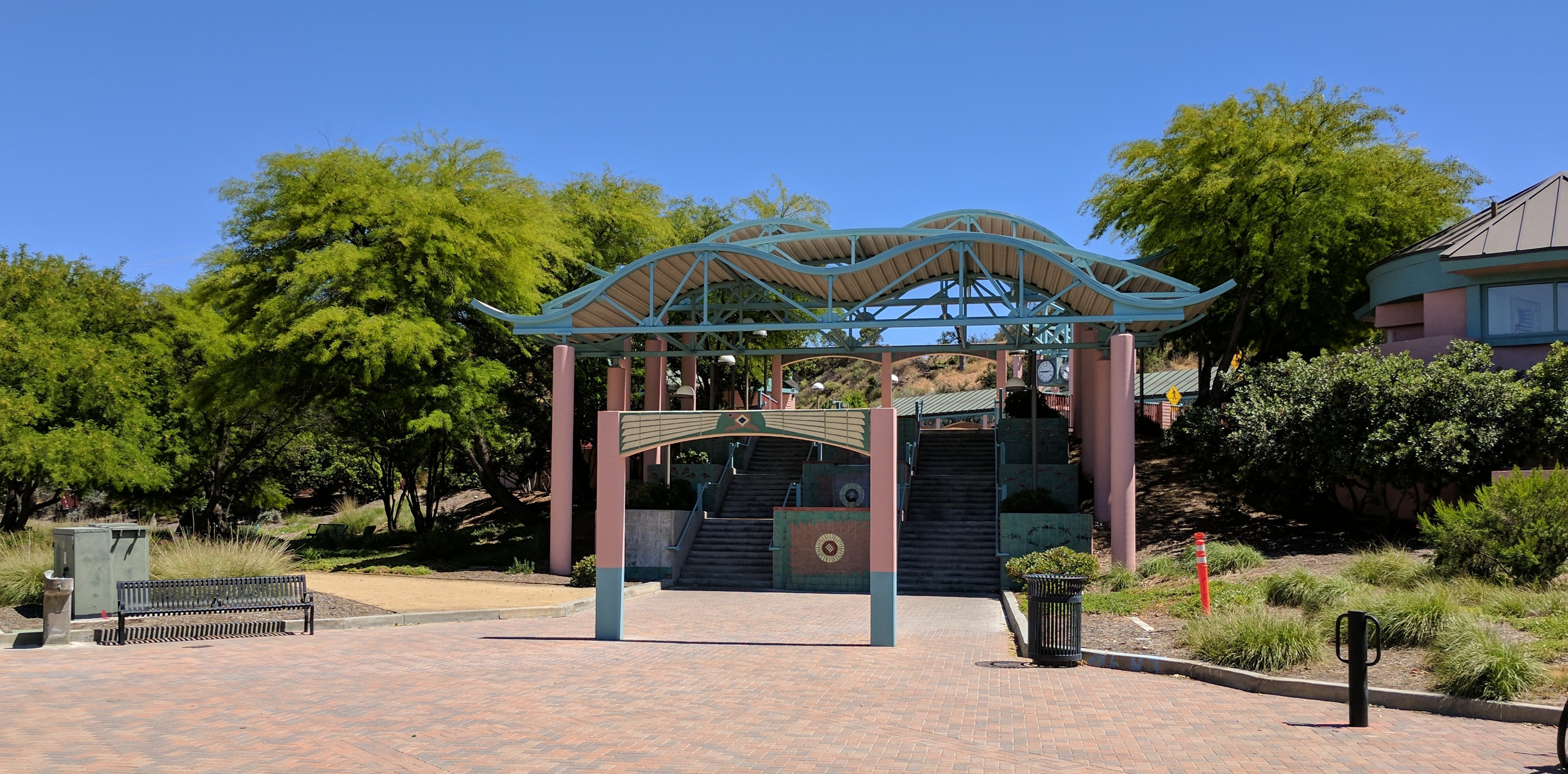
- Entrance to Santa Clarita station

General information
- Location: 22122 Soledad Canyon Road; Santa Clarita, California
- Coordinates: 34°24′49″N 118°31′31″W
- Owner: City of Santa Clarita
- Line: SCRRA Valley Subdivision
- Platforms: 1 side platform
- Tracks: 1
- Connections: Acton & Agua Dulce Shuttle; City of Santa Clarita Transit: 5, 6, 501, 502, 796, 797, 799

Construction
- Parking: 473 spaces, 10 accessible spaces
- Cycle facilities: Racks, 36 lockers, bikeway connection
- Accessible: Yes

History
- Opened: October 26, 1992

Passengers
- FY 2026: 234 (avg. wkdy boardings)

Services
Preceding station	Metrolink	Following station
Via Princessa toward Lancaster	Antelope Valley Line	Newhall toward L.A. Union Station
Location

Santa Clarita station is a Metrolink train station in the city of Santa Clarita, California. It is served by Metrolink's Antelope Valley Line between Los Angeles Union Station and Lancaster station. Because the City of Santa Clarita has three other Metrolink stations, this station is sometimes referred to as Soledad Metrolink. City of Santa Clarita Transit offers connecting bus service at the station.

Santa Clarita station is served by 30 Metrolink Antelope Valley Line trains (15 in each direction) each weekday. Weekend service consists of 24 trains (12 in each direction) on both Saturday and Sunday. On all days, trains are evenly spaced throughout the day.

== Connections ==
=== City of Santa Clarita Transit ===
The station serves as a hub for City of Santa Clarita Transit routes:

- Local: 5, 6
- Station Link: 501, 502
- Commuter Express: 796, 797, 799

=== Acton & Agua Dulce Shuttle ===
Los Angeles County Department of Public Works operates the Acton & Agua Dulce Shuttle between Santa Clarita and the communities of Acton and Agua Dulce. The shuttle operates on Monday, Wednesday and Saturday and makes a round-trip in the morning and in the evening.

=== Bikeway ===
- Santa Clara River Trail- There is a direct connection to the station; the bikeway runs along Soledad Canyon Road across the street on north side of the station.

== See also ==
- Lang Southern Pacific Station – a former Southern Pacific Railway station and California Historic Landmark
