= Acton-Agua Dulce Unified School District =

School district in California, United States

Acton-Agua Dulce Unified School District is a school district serving the rural unincorporated communities of Acton and Agua Dulce in northern Los Angeles County, California.

The district includes three schools, all in Acton: Vasquez High School, High Desert Middle School, and Meadowlark Elementary School.

== See also ==
- Palmdale School District
- Sulphur Springs School District
