= Santa Clara River Trail =

Bicycle/walking path in Santa Clarita, California

- Trailheads: Trailhead A: 34.2437°N 119.1928°W; Trailhead B: 34.2419°N 119.1868°W

The Santa Clara River Trail is a paved bicycle and walking path in the city of Santa Clarita, California.

The path is currently approximately 8 miles (13 km) in length and generally runs in an east–west direction and closely follows the path of the Santa Clara River and Soledad Canyon Road between the communities of Canyon Country and Valencia through Saugus. A north-south fork connects to the community of Newhall. The trail is generally flat with very gentle elevation. There are many jumping off points along the path providing access to neighborhoods, parks and commerce. On the western end, the path connects to an extensive network of paths, trails and elevated bridges called paseos that are independent of automobile roadway in Valencia.

The main trail and its feeders are in close proximity and provide easy access to all four Metrolink stations located within the city limits. These stations are Newhall, Santa Clarita, Via Princessa, and Vista Canyon. Bicycle locker facilities are available at all four stations.

== Future plans ==
City planners have placed a high priority on adding to the network of bike trails throughout the city as part of the approval process for future development. According to the trail's website, there are plans to extend the western end or the trail from Edison Curve to Interstate 5 near the Montalvo Branch railroad bridge. On the eastern segment of the trail, there is a plan to extend west from Camp Plenty road along the north side of the river to a point 2 miles (3.2 km) west and east from Lost Canyon Road along the north bank of the river to Shadow Pines Blvd.

According to the Santa Clarita Pedestrian and Bike Master Plan, its goal is to encourage more people to bike and walk for everyday needs by providing more accessible bikeways, trails, and paseos.
