= Sulphur Springs School District =

School district in California

Coordinates: 34.4079°N 118.4671°W

Address
- 27000 Weyerhaeuser Way Canyon Country, California, 91351; United States

District information
- Type: Public
- Grades: K–6
- Established: 1872
- NCES District ID: 0638220

Students and staff
- Students: 5,188 (2021–2022)
- Teachers: 204.60 (FTE)
- Staff: 236.76 (FTE)
- Student–teacher ratio: 25.36:1

Other information
- Website: www.sssd.k12.ca.us

The Sulphur Springs School District is an elementary school district in Los Angeles County, California. It serves the east side of the Santa Clarita Valley, including most of Canyon Country. As of 2023, the district has 9 elementary schools.

The district's headquarters are located off Via Princessa in Canyon Country, near the Via Princessa Metrolink station.

== History ==
=== 19th century ===
In 1872, Martha Mitchell began teaching her children and their neighbors children inside the Mitchell Family Adobe in what is now the Vista Canyon neighborhood of Canyon Country. In 1874, the group moved from their single room adobe classroom to a room within the Lang family's Sulphur Springs Hotel. By 1879, there were enough school children enrolled to form a school district, which was named after the mineral hot springs the hotel was built beside.

A purpose-built single room classroom was constructed in 1886, which became known as Sulphur Springs Community School.

=== 20th century ===
In 1982, Valley View Elementary School was transferred from the Saugus Union School District to Sulphur Springs School District and renamed Valley View Community School.

In 1991, Honby Elementary School, opened in 1963 as a part of Saugus Union School District, was transferred to Sulphur Springs School District and renamed Canyon Springs Community School.

== Schools ==
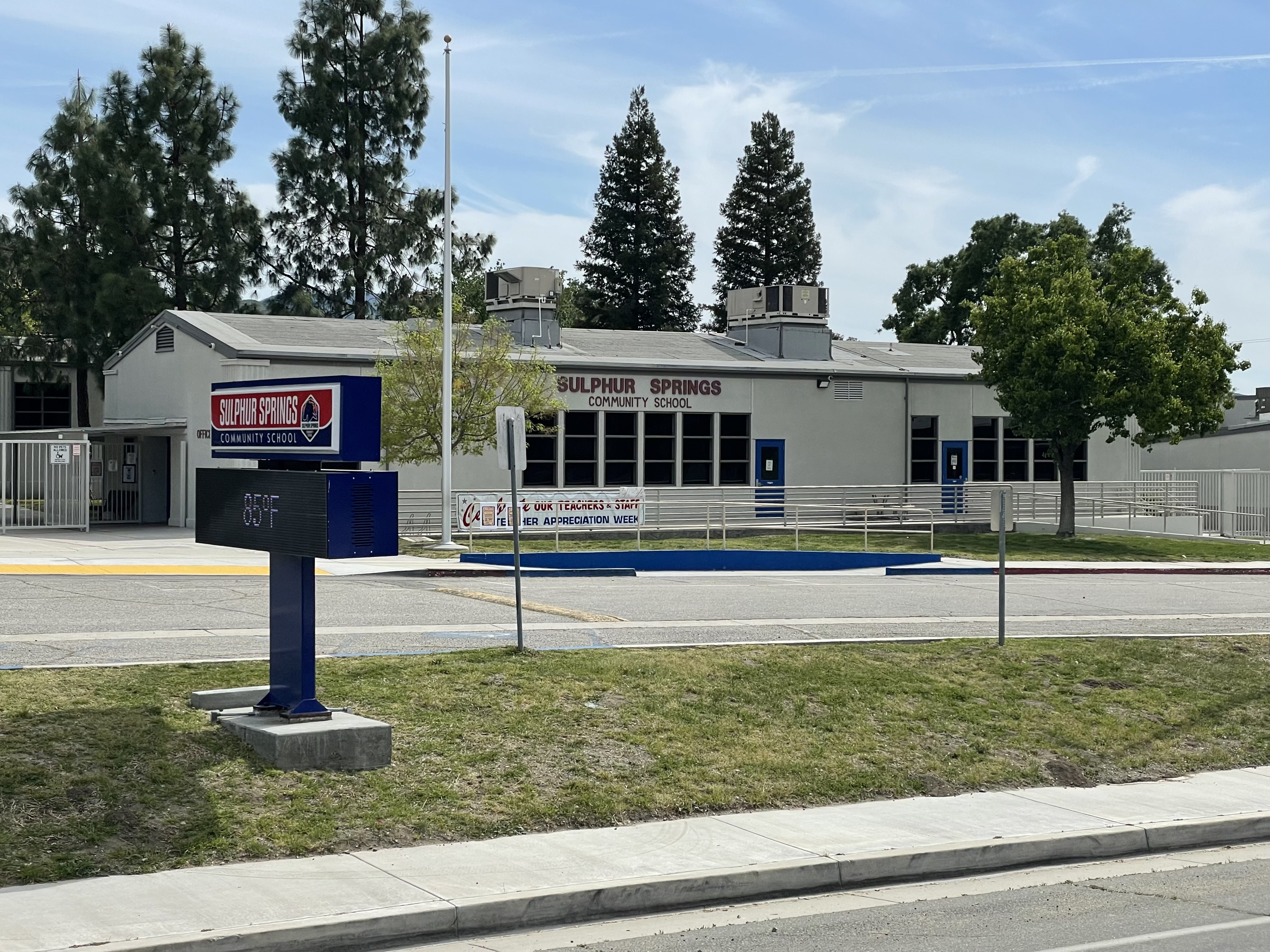
Sulphur Springs Community School, April 2023

All SSSD schools are within Santa Clarita city limits, except for Mint Canyon Community School, which is in an unincorporated area. Schools within the Sulphur Springs School District refer to themselves as "community schools," unlike schools in the Saugus and Newhall school districts which refer to themselves as "elementary schools."

Sulphur Springs School District elementary schools
School	Address	Founded	Enrollment (2022–23)
Canyon Springs Community School	19059 Vicci Street, Santa Clarita, CA 91351	1963	523
Fair Oaks Ranch Community School	26933 Silverbell Lane, Santa Clarita, CA 91387	2002	892
Golden Oak Community School	25201 Via Princessa, Santa Clarita, CA 91387	2008	535
Leona Cox Community School	18643 Oakmoor Street, Santa Clarita, CA 91351	1964	425
Mint Canyon Community School	16400 Sierra Highway, Canyon Country, CA 91351	1963	506
Mitchell Community School	16821 Goodvale Road, Santa Clarita, CA 91387	1969	566
Pinetree Community School	29156 Lotusgarden Drive, Santa Clarita, CA 91387	1988	600
Sulphur Springs Community School	16628 Lost Canyon Road, Santa Clarita, CA 91387	1872	595
Valley View Community School	19414 Sierra Estates Drive, Santa Clarita, CA 91321	1972	568

=== Closed schools ===
- Soledad Canyon School - opened in 1966 and closed in 1991. Students were transferred to the recently acquired Canyon Springs Community School.

== Student demographics ==
As of the 2022-23 school year, 5,210 students were enrolled in Sulphur Springs District schools. 57.7% of students were Hispanic or Latino, 19.8% were non-Hispanic white, 6.1% were Filipino, 5.9% were African American, 4.9% were multiracial, 3.9% were Asian American, 0.3% were Indigenous American, and 0.1% were Pacific Islander.

== See also ==
- Acton-Agua Dulce Unified School District
- Newhall School District
- Saugus Union School District
