= Valencia Town Center =

Shopping mall in Santa Clarita, California, United States

Coordinates: 34.415°N 118.558°W

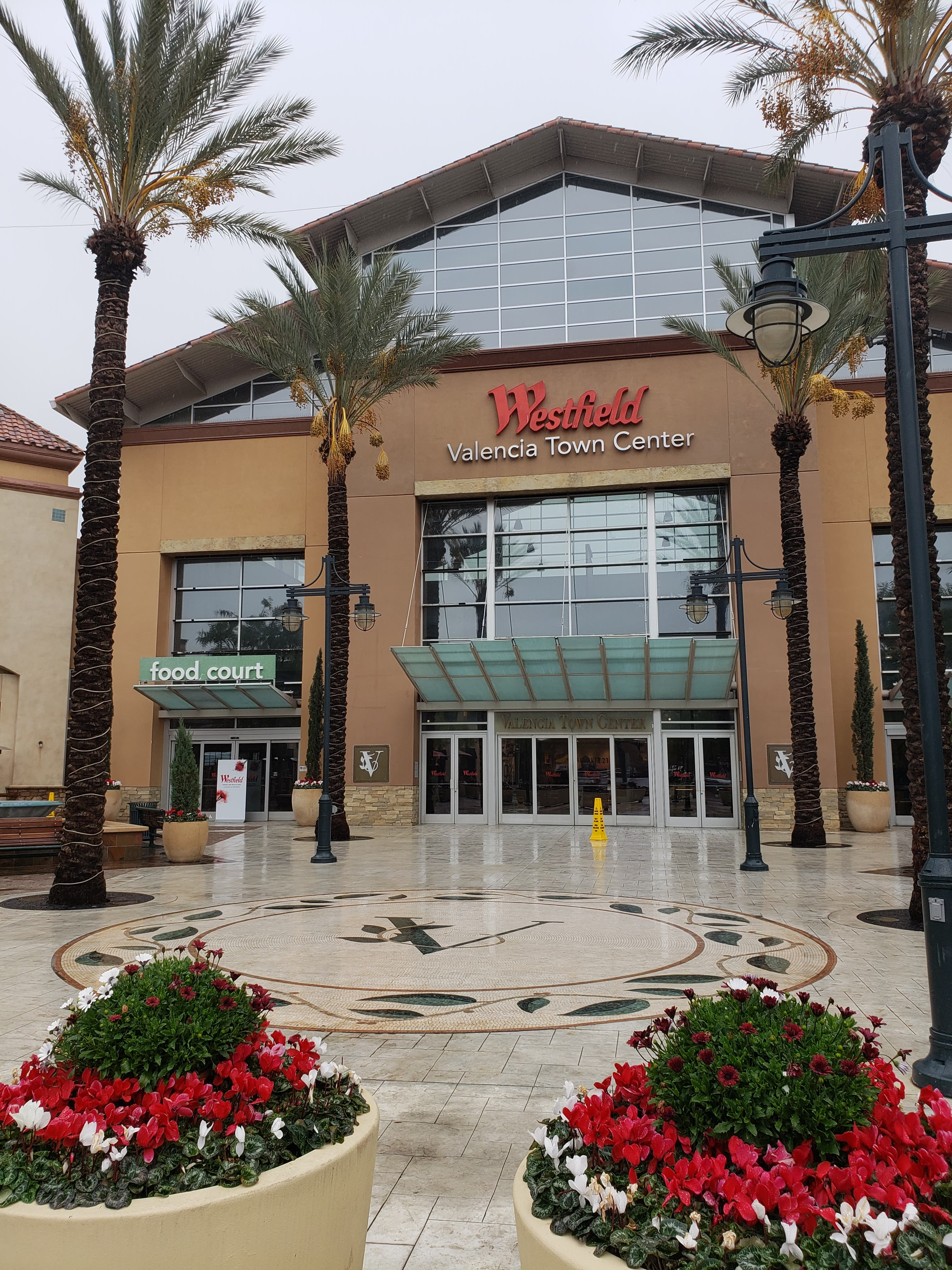
- Main entrance in 2019
- Address: 24201 Valencia Boulevard; Santa Clarita, California 91355
- Opened: September 24, 1992; 34 years ago
- Previous names: Westfield Valencia Town Center (2005 - 2023)
- Developer: JMB Realty
- Manager: Centennial Realty
- Owner: Centennial Real Estate Management
- Num. of stores: 170+
- Num. of anchor tenants: 7 (5 open, 1 vacant, 1 coming soon)
- Floor area: 1,099,201 sq ft (102,119.1 m^{2})
- Floors: 2
- Parking: 4,312
- Website: www.valenciatowncenter.com

Valencia Town Center is a shopping mall in the neighborhood of Valencia in Santa Clarita, California. It was developed by JMB Realty and is currently owned by Centennial Real Estate.

Current anchor stores include Macy's, JCPenney, Regal Cinemas, H&M, and Gold's Gym with one vacant anchor last occupied by Forever 21, which closed in 2025. A Round1 is currently under construction in the former Sears anchor and expected to open in 2027.

== History ==
Upon the mall's opening in September 1992, its anchors were May Company, JCPenney, Sears, and Edwards Theatres. The May Company was renamed to Robinsons-May the following year.

In the late 1990s, there was a major remodeling, as the Edwards Theatres inside the mall was demolished and replaced with the mall's current food court. Edwards opened a new theater (now Regal Cinemas) in May 1999 on the outside of the mall, in the Town Center Drive area. Additional anchors Borders (now Gold's Gym) and Bombay Company (later Forever 21, now vacant) were also added around this time.

Westfield Group had acquired a quarter-interest in the property in 2002 and a further quarter-interest in 2005, thereafter assuming management control. After the sale, the mall was renamed to Westfield Valencia Town Center.

The Robinsons-May anchor was renamed to Macy's in 2006.

In January 2008, an expansion to the mall broke ground, replacing portions of a parking lot with an outdoor retail and dining area called The Patios, and an expansion to Macy's. The 1st half, comprising the Macy's expansion and part of The Patios, opened on November 18, 2009, while the 2nd half, connecting The Patios to Sears, opened on November 11, 2010.

In January 2018, it was announced that Sears would close. It’s location at Westfield Valencia Town Center would close in March 2018.

In November 2018, it was announced that the Westfield Valencia Town Center would undergo a $20 million renovation, which was slated to be completed by 2019.

In 2019, Westfield Valencia Town Center proposed a new “The Patios Connection” project at the former Sears site, which would include a luxury cinema, gym, Costco, and gas station. The proposed Costco would include a 275-space, rooftop parking lot. In April 2021, the project was canceled due to the COVID-19 pandemic.

In September 2023, Centennial acquired the Westfield Valencia Town Center from Westfield. The mall was reverted back to its original name after the sale.

In March 2026, it was announced that Round1 would occupy the former Sears site as part of their expansion plans for their entertainment centers across the United States, particularly in California. The new Round1 arcade is set to be 125,000 square feet in size. Round1 plans to renovate the former Sears building and open a bowling alley and arcade by 2027.

== Gallery ==
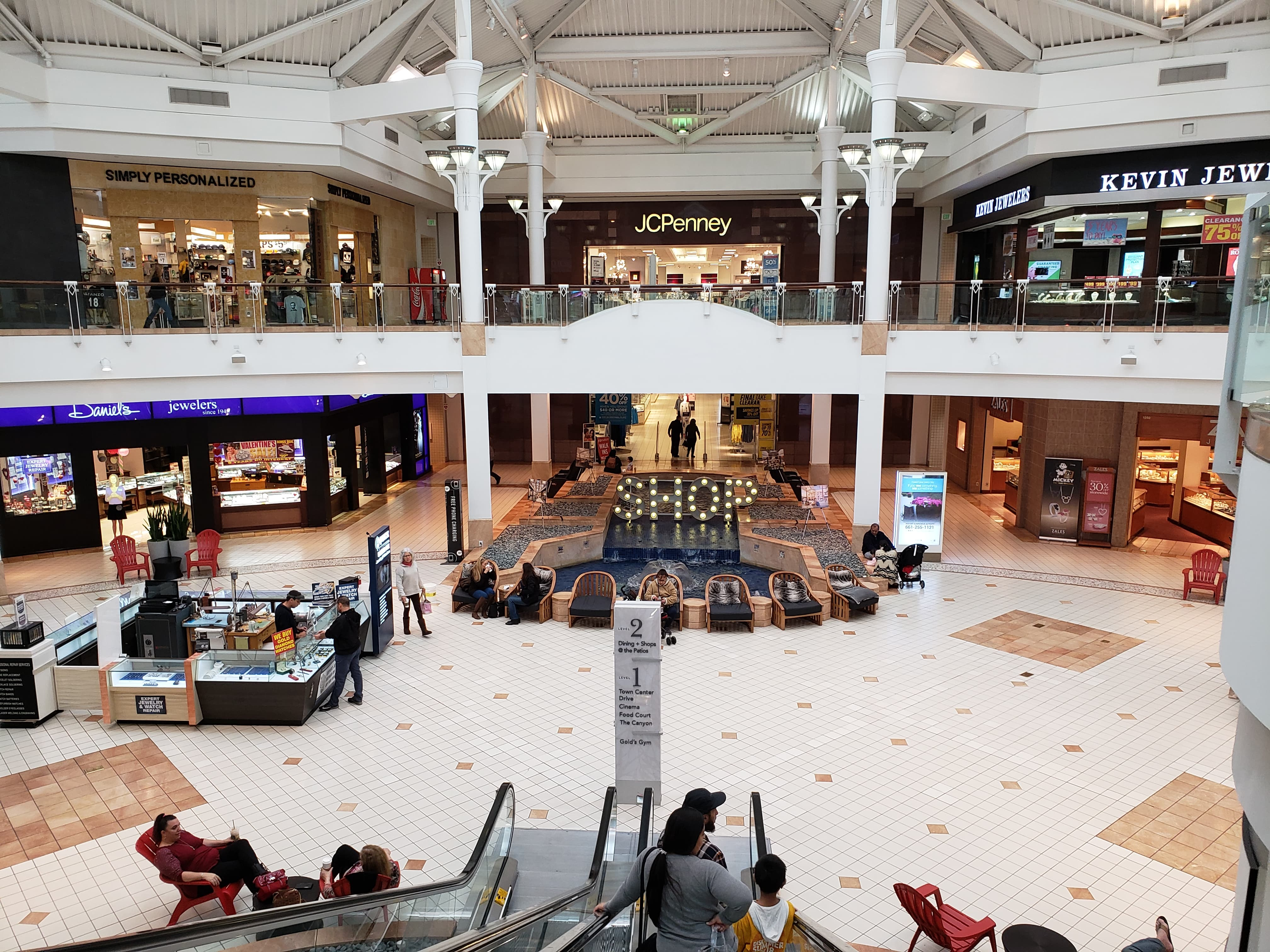
Indoor fountain and surrounding shops

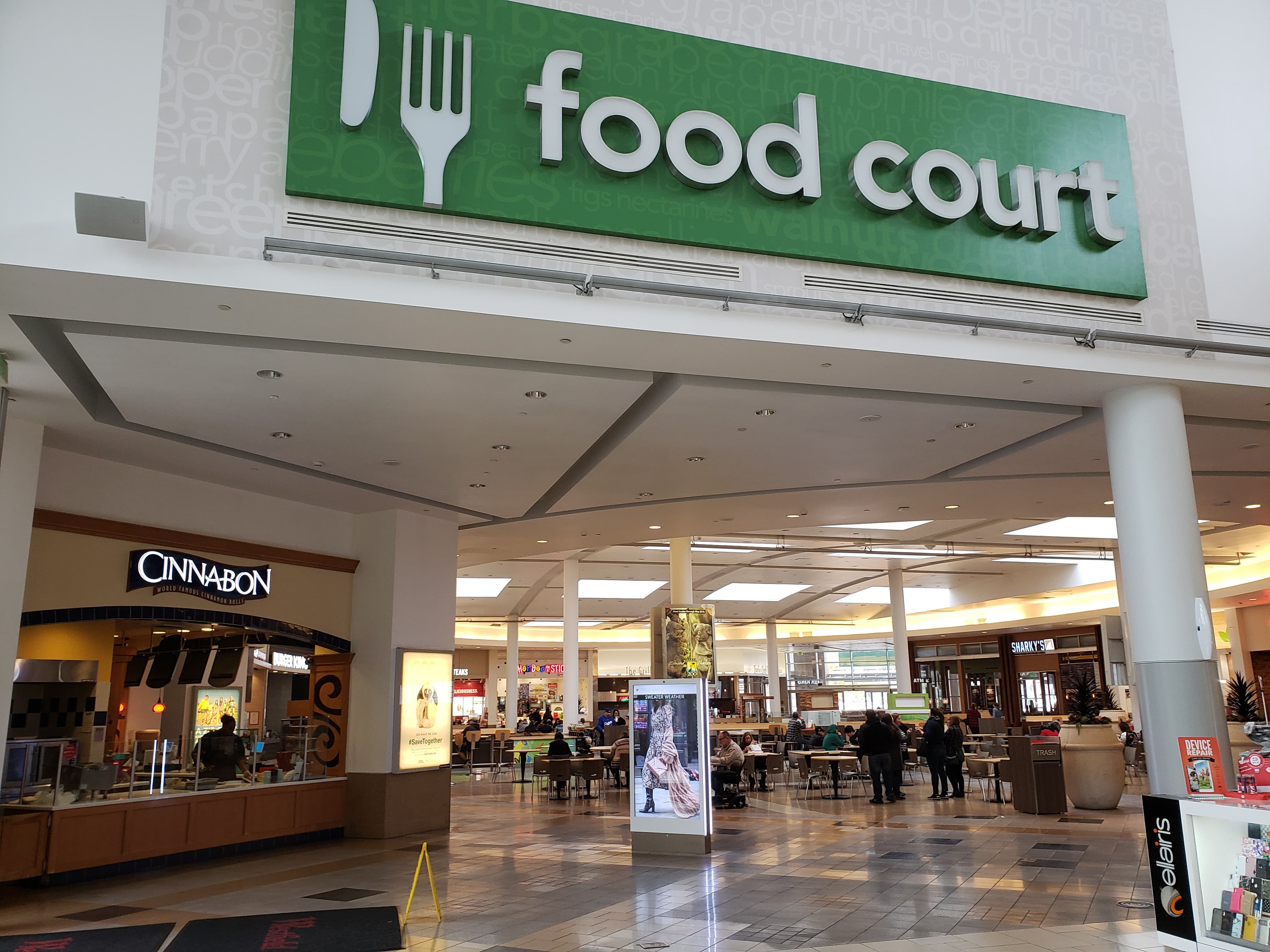
Food court

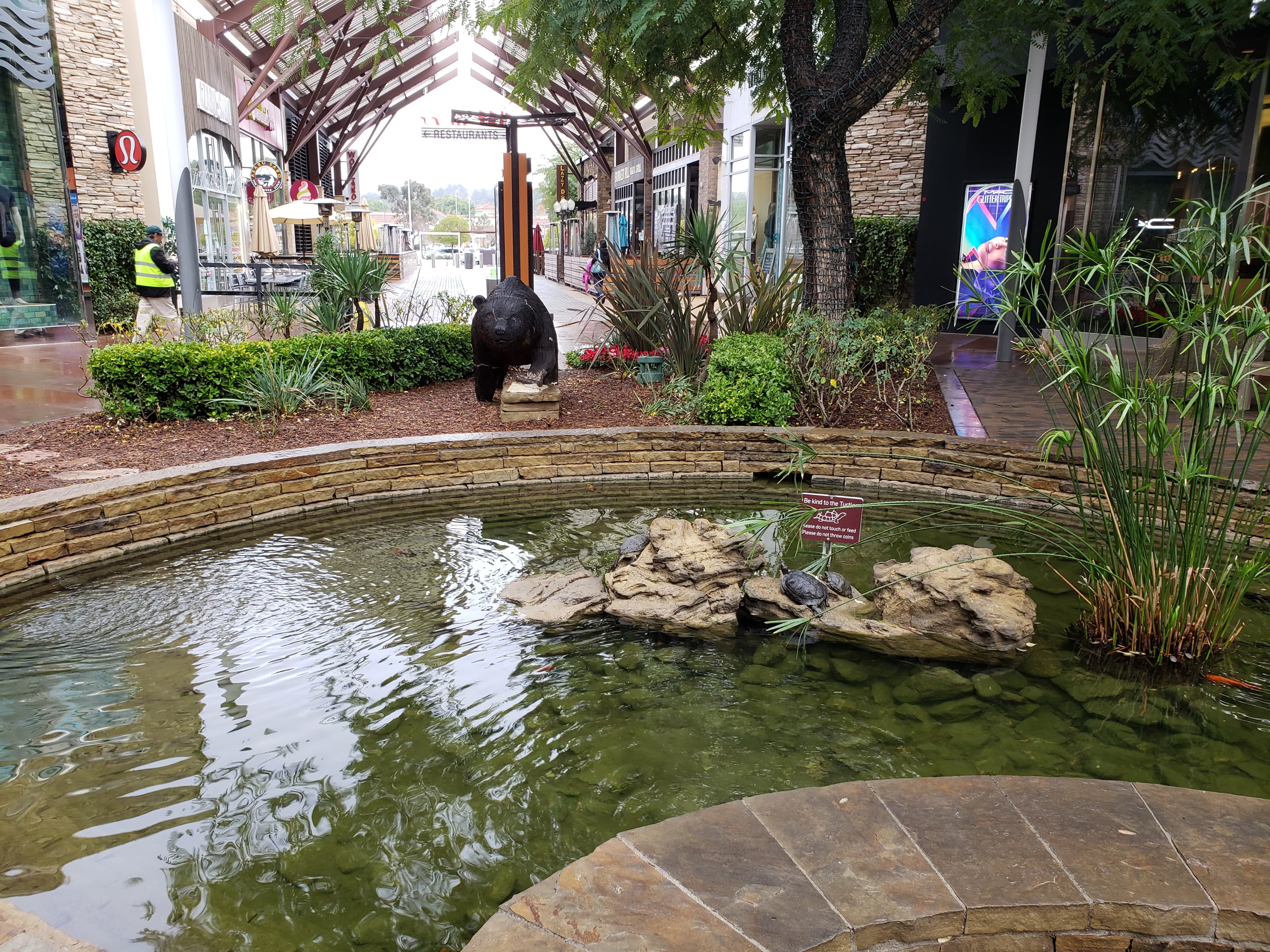
Outdoor pond

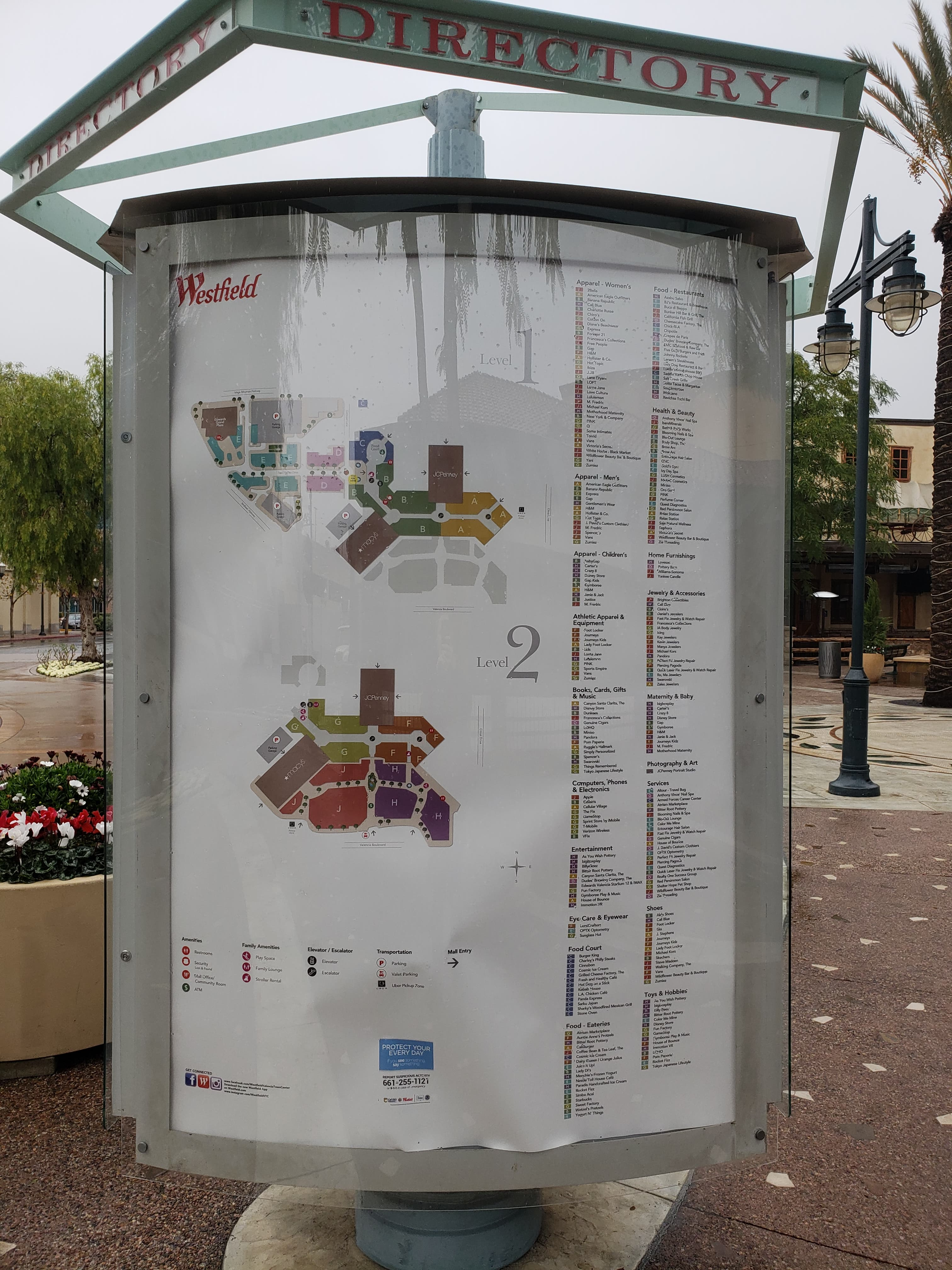
Mall directory
