= Agua Dulce, California =

Census-designated place in California, United States

- Unincorporated community Census designated place
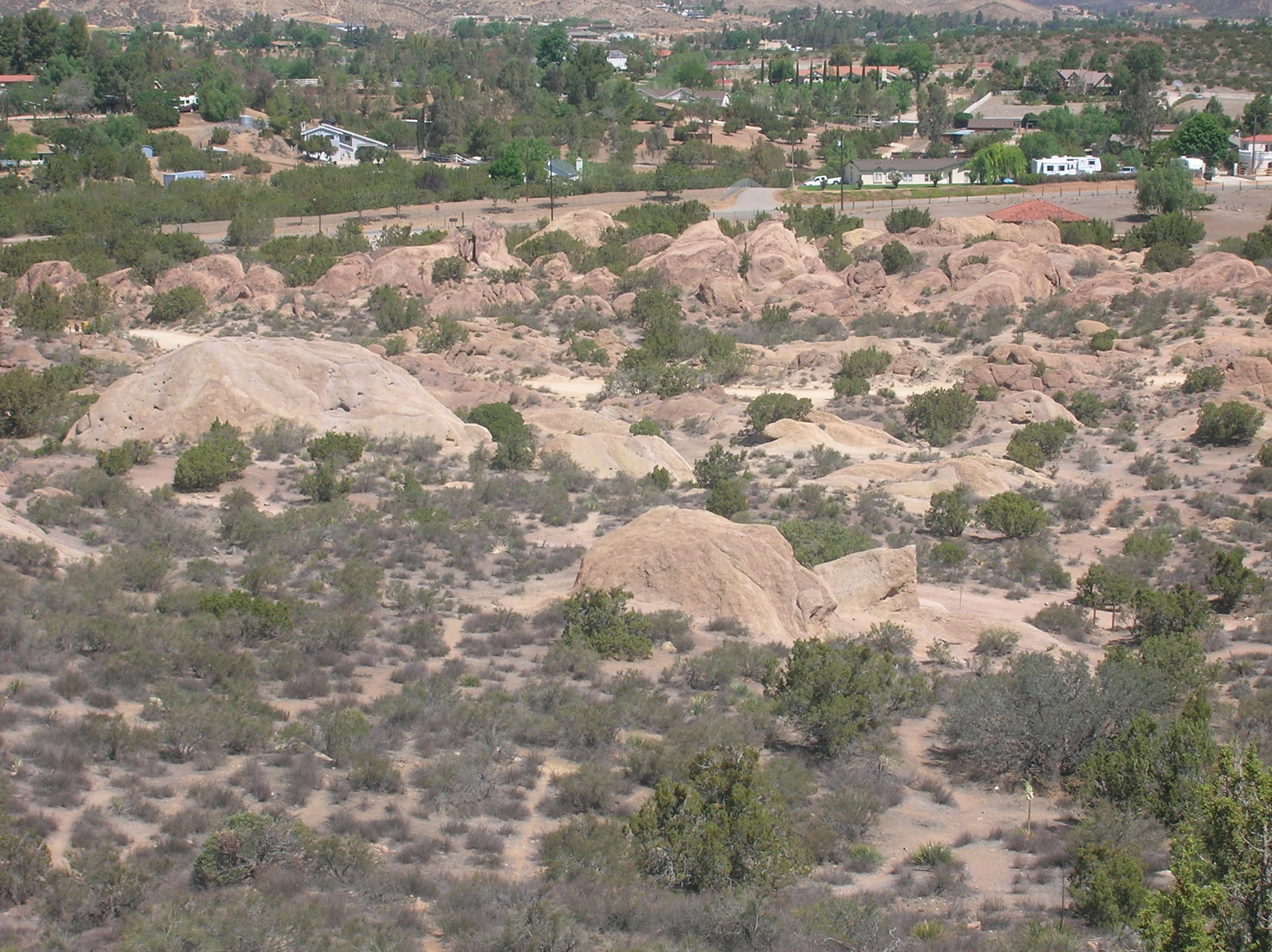
- Agua Dulce as seen from Vasquez Rocks

- Location within Los Angeles County

- Location in California Location in the United States
- Coordinates: 34.50°N 118.32°W
- Country: United States
- State: California
- County: Los Angeles
- Named for: Spanish for "sweet water"

Area
  - Total: 22.86 sq mi (59.20 km^{2})
  - Land: 22.85 sq mi (59.18 km^{2})
  - Water: 0.0039 sq mi (0.01 km^{2}) 0.02%
- Elevation: 2,526 ft (770 m)

Population (2020)
  - Total: 3,451
  - Density: 151.0/sq mi (58.31/km^{2})
- Time zone: UTC-8 (Pacific (PST))
  - Summer (DST): UTC-7 (PDT)
- ZIP codes: 91390
- Area code: 661
- GNIS feature IDs: 1660235; 2582928
- FIPS code: 06-00450

Agua Dulce (Spanish for "Sweet Water") is an unincorporated community and census-designated place (CDP) in Los Angeles County, California, United States. It lies at an elevation of 2,526 feet (770 m), northeast of Santa Clarita. The community had a population of 3,451 at the 2020 census and covers a geographic area of about 23 square miles (59 km^{2}). Agua Dulce is on the Pacific Crest Trail. The ZIP code is 91390 (shared with Green Valley and far northern Santa Clarita), and the area code is 661.

== Geography ==
Agua Dulce is located along California State Route 14, halfway between Santa Clarita and Palmdale, and 45 miles (72 km) north of Los Angeles, in the Sierra Pelona Valley region of Southern California. Vasquez Rocks is located in Agua Dulce. The Pacific Crest Trail, which runs from Mexico to Canada, goes through Agua Dulce.

== History ==
The Tataviam Native Americans were the earliest inhabitants.

On June 1, 2021, a shooting occurred at Los Angeles County Fire Department Station 81 in Agua Dulce. Firefighter Jonathan Tatone shot and killed a fellow firefighter and wounded a fire captain.

== Demographics ==
Historical population
Census	Pop.	Note	%±
2010	3,342		—
2020	3,451		3.3%
U.S. Decennial Census; 1860–1870 1880-1890; 1900 1910 1920; 1930 1940 1950; 1960 1970 1980; 1990 2000 2010; 2020

Agua Dulce first appeared as a census designated place in the 2010 U.S. census.

=== Racial and ethnic composition ===
Agua Dulce CDP, California – Racial and ethnic composition Note: the US Census treats Hispanic/Latino as an ethnic category. This table excludes Latinos from the racial categories and assigns them to a separate category. Hispanics/Latinos may be of any race.
Race / Ethnicity (NH = Non-Hispanic)	Pop 2010	Pop 2020	% 2010	% 2020
White alone (NH)	2,524	2,291	75.52%	66.39%
Black or African American alone (NH)	50	46	1.50%	1.33%
Native American or Alaska Native alone (NH)	19	13	0.57%	0.38%
Asian alone (NH)	69	59	2.06%	1.71%
Native Hawaiian or Pacific Islander alone (NH)	2	2	0.06%	0.06%
Other race alone (NH)	4	21	0.12%	0.61%
Mixed race or Multiracial (NH)	63	151	1.89%	4.38%
Hispanic or Latino (any race)	611	868	18.28%	25.15%
Total	3,342	3,451	100.00%	100.00%

=== 2020 census ===
As of the 2020 census, Agua Dulce had a population of 3,451 and a population density of 151.0 inhabitants per square mile (58.3/km^{2}). The median age was 49.3 years. The age distribution was 17.9% under the age of 18, 7.6% aged 18 to 24, 19.5% aged 25 to 44, 33.2% aged 45 to 64, and 21.8% aged 65 or older. For every 100 females, there were 101.2 males, and for every 100 females age 18 and over, there were 102.1 males age 18 and over.

The whole population lived in households. There were 1,238 households, of which 26.3% had children under the age of 18. Of all households, 59.5% were married-couple households, 6.4% were cohabiting couple households, 17.9% had a male householder with no spouse or partner present, and 16.2% had a female householder with no spouse or partner present. About 19.0% of all households were made up of individuals, and 8.9% had someone living alone who was 65 years of age or older. The average household size was 2.79, and there were 933 families (75.4% of all households).

0.0% of residents lived in urban areas, while 100.0% lived in rural areas.

There were 1,303 housing units at an average density of 57.0 units per square mile (22.0 units/km^{2}). Of the housing units, 5.0% were vacant and 95.0% were occupied. Of occupied units, 86.4% were owner-occupied and 13.6% were occupied by renters. The homeowner vacancy rate was 0.6%, and the rental vacancy rate was 2.9%.

=== Income and poverty ===
In 2023, the US Census Bureau estimated that the median household income was $124,268, and the per capita income was $60,482. About 4.3% of families and 10.2% of the population were below the poverty line.

== Education ==
Acton-Agua Dulce Unified School District:

- Vasquez High School, Acton
- High Desert Middle School, Acton
- Meadowlark School, Acton
- Agua Dulce Elementary School, Agua Dulce

== Government ==
In the California State Legislature, Agua Dulce is in the 23rd senatorial district, represented by Republican Suzette Martinez Valladares, and in the 34th Assembly district, represented by Republican Tom Lackey.

In the United States House of Representatives, Agua Dulce is in California's 27th congressional district, represented by Democrat George T. Whitesides.

== Filming location ==
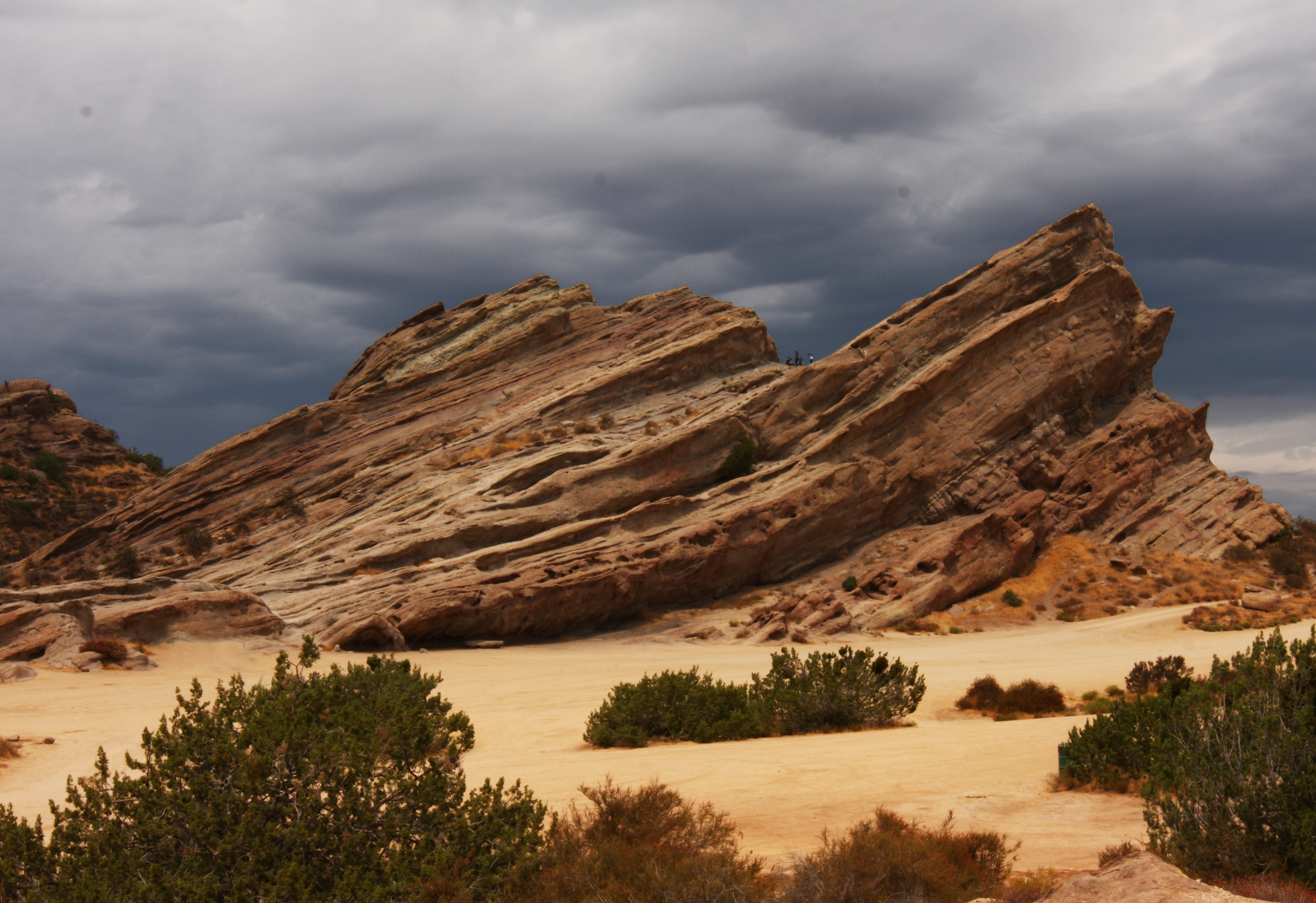
Vasquez Rocks

Vasquez Rocks has long been used as a popular filming location by the Hollywood movie industry, most notably The Flintstones movie, Mel Brooks' Blazing Saddles, The Invaders episode "The Saucer", and the Star Trek episode "Arena." The 1971 movie Duel filmed extensively in the area, as was the western film More Dead Than Alive. Other films shot in the area are Rat Race, Bill & Ted's Bogus Journey and The Immaculate Conception of Little Dizzle. The History channel shoots the popular reality TV show "Top Shot" in the hills and canyons on the north side of the valley. Reno 911 has filmed in locations off of Soledad Canyon Road.

The Agua Dulce area has played host to music video shoots, including those for Tom Petty and the Heartbreakers "You Got Lucky", Bloodhound Gang's "Your Only Friends Are Make-Believe", Weird Al Yankovic's "I Love Rocky Road", and various Nike commercials. L.A. based rockers and "Rat Pack" recording artist "Roxanne" filmed "Super Bad" at the Diamond View Ranch in Agua Dulce.

Vasquez Rocks got its name from the famous bandit Tiburcio Vásquez who used them as a hideout.

Most recently, Agua Dulce was used as the primary setting for Jordan Peele’s 2022 horror sci-fi film Nope. The main characters in the film are horse wranglers that often work on movie shoots that happen around Agua Dulce.

== Transportation ==
Agua Dulce has a general aviation airport known as Agua Dulce Airpark. The Airpark and surrounding area was the location for the ABC game show 101 Ways to Leave a Gameshow which premiered on June 21, 2011.

== Notable people ==
- David Cutler Lewis, musician, member of Ambrosia and Shadowfax
- Doug Turner, sound engineer
