= Castaic Union School District =

School district in California, United States

Address
- 28131 Livingston Avenue Valencia, California, 91355; United States

District information
- Type: Public
- Grades: K–8
- NCES District ID: 0607740

Students and staff
- Students: 1,860 (2020–2021)
- Teachers: 76.43 (FTE)
- Staff: 101.65 (FTE)
- Student–teacher ratio: 24.34:1

Other information
- Website: www.castaicusd.com

Castaic Union School District is a public school district serving unincorporated Castaic, portions of unincorporated Valencia, and a very small portion of the city of Santa Clarita within Los Angeles County, California, offering elementary and secondary instruction, grades pre-K through eighth. Until 1890, it was known as the "Castec School District."

A small portion of the district's boundaries reside within the city limits of Santa Clarita. The vast majority of this area consists of commercial and industrial properties along with vacant parcels. However, a very small area of residential and multi-family properties located near the intersection of Newhall Ranch Road and Copper Hill Drive are within the city limits of Santa Clarita, and lie within the boundary of the Castaic Union School District.

Although Castaic High School lies within the district's boundaries, it is controlled by the William S. Hart Union High School District and the school board already in place which oversee its sixteen high schools, junior high schools, and charter schools. The Hart District offices are located thirteen miles southeast of the new Castaic High School site in the city of Santa Clarita. Castaic High School's boundaries are coterminous with those of the Castaic Union School District.

== Boundaries ==
It includes the census-designated places of Castaic, Hasley Canyon, and Val Verde. There is also a portion of Santa Clarita in the district.

== Schools ==
- Castaic Elementary School (K-6)
- Castaic Middle School (7-8)
- Live Oak Elementary School (K-6)
- Northlake Hills Elementary School (K-6)

== See also ==
- El Tejon Unified School District
- Fillmore Unified School District
- Saugus Union School District
