= 2009 California's 32nd congressional district special election =

- July 14, 2009

California's 32nd congressional district
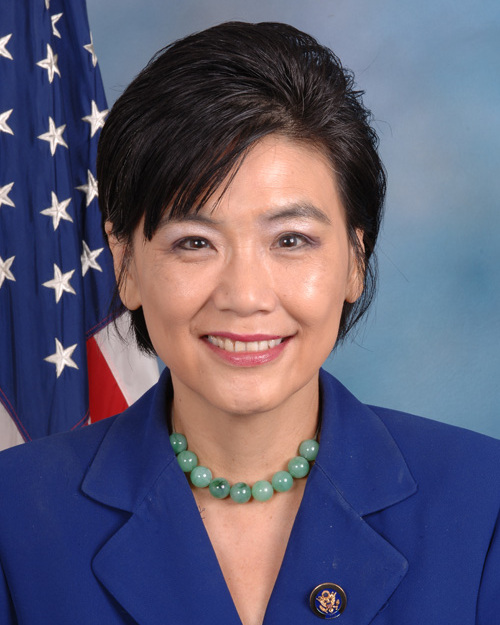

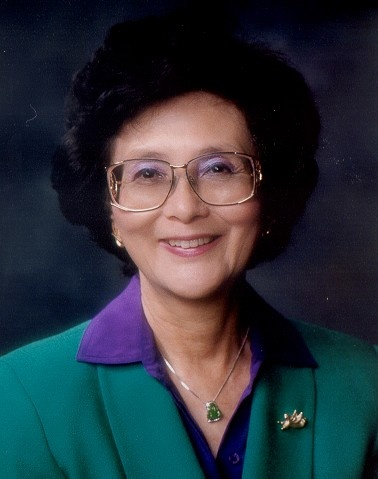

| Nominee | Judy Chu | Betty Tom Chu | Christopher Agrella |
| Party | Democratic | Republican | Libertarian |
| Popular vote | 16,194 | 8,630 | 1,356 |
| Percentage | 61.8% | 33.0% | 5.2% |
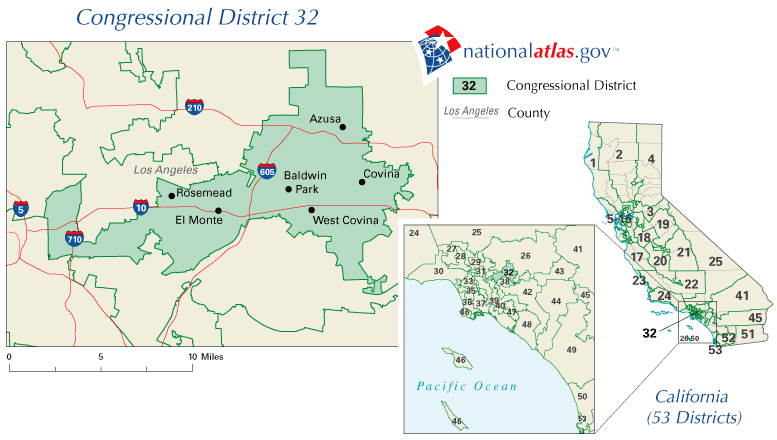
U.S. Representative before election
Hilda Solis
Democratic
Elected U.S. Representative
Judy Chu
Democratic

The 2009 California's 32nd congressional district special election was held July 14, 2009, to fill the vacancy in California's 32nd congressional district. The election was won by Democrat Judy Chu, who became the first Chinese American woman elected to serve in Congress.

== Background ==
The election resulted from Hilda Solis's resignation to become Secretary of Labor following her confirmation on February 24, 2009. The election was called to fill the rest of her term, which ended on January 3, 2011.

On March 10, Governor Arnold Schwarzenegger called for the special primary election to be held on May 19, the same day as a statewide special election. A candidate who received the majority of votes in the primary election would have been declared the winner and no runoff would have been held. Since no candidate won a majority, the candidates that won the most votes in each party appeared on the ballot for the general runoff election, held on July 14.

== Candidates ==
A total of 13 candidates registered for the special election, of which only three qualified for the runoff general election. One additional candidate registered only for the general election.

=== Democratic ===
- Francisco Alonso, former Mayor of Monterey Park
- Gil Cedillo, State Senator from the 22nd district
- Judy Chu, member of the State Board of Equalization from the fourth district
- Benita Duran, former aide to Hilda Solis
- Stefan Lysenko, independent filmmaker
- Nick Mostert, attorney and legislative analyst
- Rafael Nadal, businessman and field representative
- Emanuel Pleitez, economic advisor

=== Independent ===
- Eleanor Garcia, a write-in candidate for the general election

=== Libertarian ===
- Christopher Agrella, a businessman

=== Republican ===
- Betty Chu, a member of the Monterey Park City Council
- Teresa Hernandez, a businesswoman
- Larry Scarborough, a write-in candidate for the primary election
- David Truax, a businessman

== Primary campaign ==
The campaign to replace Solis began as soon as her nomination to Obama's cabinet was announced.

State Senator (and former Majority Leader) Gloria Romero, whose 24th State Senate district overlaps the congressional district, became the first politician to express interest in running for the open seat. On December 18, 2008, the day that Solis's selection first became known, Romero said, "I have deep roots, and I would certainly give it every consideration. Definitely, I am interested". The same State Senate seat was previously held by Solis. Of the many possible contenders, Romero said, "I can beat them all". However, on January 8, Romero decided not to run for the seat, opting to try for California State Superintendent of Public Instruction instead.

On December 22, Judy Chu, Chair of the State Board of Equalization, announced that she would run in the special election. She said, "I've decided to heed those calls [of supporters]. I know this district very, very well and I believe the people of this district know me and know I'm very devoted to the San Gabriel Valley". The congressional district makeup was 48% Latino and 13% Asian. She began campaigning heavily, and captured the endorsements of several San Gabriel Valley politicos. (The following month, Chu became Vice Chair of the Board of Equalization.)

On January 8, 2009, State Senator Gil Cedillo announced he was running. He was endorsed by Romero once she decided not to run, and the race was largely viewed as a contest between Chu and Cedillo. Cedillo collected the endorsements of several local mayors.

On January 7, the day before, Emanuel Pleitez, a 26-year-old member of the Barack Obama presidential transition team for the U.S. Treasury Department, had declared his intentions to run. A young banker who left Goldman Sachs, Pleitez is a native of the district. Pleitez ran a more grassroots campaign, relying on a steady flow of volunteers and various individuals making any contribution to his efforts. The Huffington Post said if elected, he would become the second member of the Millennial generation to serve in Congress. By late March, the Pleitez campaign had about 20 full-time staffers and many volunteers; it was also the first campaign of the 32nd Congressional district to open a campaign office, and launched a modern website before any candidate.

By late January, Blanca Rubio, president of the Baldwin Park Unified School District Board of Education, also said she was running. However, she was not mentioned in subsequent press reports about the election. In late March, she said she was withdrawing from the race for family reasons and endorsed Chu.

Others who had been mentioned as possible candidates for the seat included Assemblyman Charles M. Calderon, his brothers Senator Ronald S. Calderon and former Assemblyman Thomas M. Calderon (both Ronald and Thomas Calderon subsequently declined to run and endorsed Cedillo instead), Assemblyman Edward Hernandez (who subsequently declined to run and endorsed Chu instead), Chu's husband, Assemblyman Mike Eng, and former Assemblyman Ed Chavez (who subsequently declined to run and endorsed Cedillo instead). Candidates from outside the congressional district were also permitted by law.

No major Republicans indicated that they would run in the special election. The Republican who were candidates were former Covina mayor David Truax, accountant Jim Hetzel, and business owner Teresa Hernandez. Hetzel and Hernandez were political newcomers, and these were the first Republicans to vie for the seat since 2002.

As the only Libertarian Party candidate, Christopher Agrella, a businessman, was guaranteed to move on to any general election from the primary. Agrella said his top priorities if elected would be to bring about real government accountability, balance the federal budget by cutting out waste, and repeal the federal tax code in its entirety.

Turnout in special elections is almost always low, and support from organized labor was seen as crucial in helping to get out a candidate's vote. On January 26, Chu received the coveted endorsement of the Los Angeles County Federation of Labor. Cedillo replied that he had a long association with the labor movement and that, "At the end of the day, people know me as a public servant who delivers and not as a politician." Somewhat ironically, all of this campaign activity had taken place before there was any official vacancy in the seat, as Solis's confirmation process was being held up in the United States Senate. Solis herself decline to endorse any of the potential replacements for her, although Chu suggested that the congresswoman would prefer her.

On February 24, 2009, the special election finally became a certainty, with Solis's long confirmation process coming to a successful close.

Chu formally announced her candidacy on February 27, stating, "It occurred to me this seat would open, and who could carry on ... [Solis's] desire to represent the constituents?" Cedillo formally announced his candidacy on March 7 at a rally in El Monte.

The first candidates' forum was held on March 19 in Cypress Park, Los Angeles, sponsored by the Southwest Voter Registration Education Project. Only Cedillo, Chu, and Pleitez were invited. By late March, Cedillo and Chu had each raised several hundred thousand dollars and were widely viewed as the frontrunners. A fellow of the Rose Institute of State and Local Government characterized the contest by saying: "When people talk about this race, there's Cedillo and Chu, then there's Pleitez, and then there's everybody else." Through the end of March, Chu had raised $770,000, Cedillo $568,000, and Pleitez $153,000. One political analyst commented ruefully, "It does not take a lot of money in these low turn out races, but that doesn't mean a lot of money isn't going to be spent."

By April 6, the official filing deadline for the primary, twelve candidates had filed for the race, comprising eight Democrats, three Republicans, and one Libertarian. Chu and Cedillo were still considered the front-runners, with each having raised hundreds of thousands of dollars for their campaigns. Judy Chu's task was complicated by the appearance of her cousin-in-law, Betty Chu, a Republican Monterey Park City Council member and former mayor, on the ballot as well. Benita Duran entered the race as the last candidate for the 32nd Congressional district. She was the former deputy district director for Solis' congressional office and staged a grassroots campaign for the seat.

By early May, Cedillo and Chu were battling each other via campaign mailers, with Cedillo putting out attacks on Chu that included unrelated headlines from articles about the 2008 financial crisis. Cedillo also put out a mailer against Pleitez that represented one of the first uses of in American politics of Facebook photographs for opposition research and negative campaigning. Cedillo's material likened Pleitez's socializing to Animal House and accused Pleitez of flashing gang signs. Chu had the endorsement of Mayor of Los Angeles Antonio Villaraigosa. While Solis herself continued to remain neutral, Solis's husband, parents, and siblings all endorsed Chu.

== Primary results ==
In the May 19 primary, Democrat Judy Chu led all candidates, but failed to gain enough to prevent a runoff general election. Betty Chu qualified as the Republican candidate for the runoff and Christopher Agrella qualified as the Libertarian.

California's 32nd congressional district special primary, 2009
| Party | Candidate | Votes | % |
|---|---|---|---|
| Democratic | Judy Chu | 17,661 | 32.6 |
| Democratic | Gil Cedillo | 12,570 | 23.2 |
| Democratic | Emanuel Pleitez | 7,252 | 13.4 |
| Republican | Betty Chu | 5,648 | 10.4 |
| Republican | Teresa Hernandez | 4,581 | 8.5 |
| Republican | David Truax | 3,303 | 6.1 |
| Democratic | Francisco Alonso | 1,097 | 2.0 |
| Libertarian | Christopher Agrella | 654 | 1.2 |
| Democratic | Benita Duran | 659 | 1.2 |
| Democratic | Stefan Lysenko | 246 | 0.4 |
| Democratic | Nick Mostert | 244 | 0.4 |
| Democratic | Rafael Nadal | 200 | 0.4 |
| Republican | Larry Scarborough (write-in) | 1 | 0.0 |
| Valid ballots | | 54,116 | 94.6 |
| Invalid or blank votes | | 3,106 | 5.4 |
| Total votes | | 57,222 | 100.0 |
| Turnout | | | 26.2 |

== General election campaign ==
Not much media attention was given to the general election race due to the district's heavily Democratic lean. The San Gabriel Valley Tribune dubbed the race "The Chu Chu train" in reference to the same last names of the two major candidates, while a campaign consultant referred to it as "The Chu-Chu runoff". With expected turnout at the 10 percent level, one analyst dismissed the possible name confusion effect on voters: "When you’re dealing with that low of turnout, you’re dealing with a sophisticated, knowledgeable electorate." Despite their relation by marriage, the two women did not know each other well nor like each other. Judy May Chu accused Betty Tom Chu of dropping her middle name "Tom" in order to play further upon the name similarity, a charge that Betty Chu sternly denied.

At a June 23 debate featuring the three candidates, the two Chus presented conflicting views on term limits, the Employee Free Choice Act, and universal health care. Following the debate, while Betty Chu remained in the area, Judy Chu flew to Washington, D.C., to meet with Democratic leaders, indicating her confidence in winning the race.

With the election looming, Judy Chu has actually downsized her headquarters, again signaling her confidence in winning the heavily democratic district. On the other side, Betty Chu opened a campaign headquarters, and Libertarian candidate Christopher Agrella operated his low-tech campaign out of a storage shed. While Judy Chu was considered to be the clear front-runner, she said she was not taking anything for granted; much of her campaigning involved phone calls to voters and fundraising. Betty Chu also worked to raise funds and to get her message out, telling voters that she had a great deal of experience as a long-time attorney, banker, entrepreneur, and elected official. Agrella continued to run what he called a "shoe-string" campaign, trying to get his name known in the district.

A forum, sponsored by the American Legion, was held between Betty Chu and Christopher Agrella. Judy Chu was originally scheduled to participate but dropped out to do a fundraiser. Judy Chu also did not attend a forum sponsored by Looking Green, leading to the cancellation of the forum, since the remaining candidates felt it was unnecessary due to their similar positions on the issues. The Judy Chu campaign explained their reason for not attending was to spend the last days of the campaign contacting voters and making sure they show up for the election, which was expected to have low turnout.

Fundraising reports indicated that Judy Chu had raised $1.3 million from individuals (constituting about three-quarters), PACs, and unions. The amount was more than expected and budgeted for the race by the campaign. The campaign indicated that $1 million was spent in the primary, and $200,000 spent in the general election. Betty Chu spent around $75,000 on efforts to get her name known in the district with billboards, mailers, and TV ads. Much of the spent monies were personal loans. The Betty Chu campaign missed one filing deadline with the Federal Election Commission.

With turnout expected not to be higher than 10%, or 25,000 or so votes, both Chus were working to ensure their constituents turned out on election day. The general election was considered less relevant than the primary by the voters, with the Judy Chu campaign acknowledging that many of the voters they had talked to thought the primary in May was the end of the election. While Judy Chu was pushing to ensure loyal Democrats come to the polls, Betty Chu worked to get Republicans, unmotivated to show up by the district's Democratic tilt, to flock to the polls and perhaps pull off a long-shot upset. Over 10,000 absentee ballots were filed, with about half from Democrats, a third from Republicans, and the remaining from unaffiliated voters.

== General election results ==
2009 California's 32nd congressional district special election
| Party | Candidate | Votes | % |
|---|---|---|---|
| Democratic | Judy Chu | 16,194 | 61.8 |
| Republican | Betty Chu | 8,630 | 33.0 |
| Libertarian | Christopher Agrella | 1,356 | 5.2 |
| Independent | Eleanor Garcia (write-in) | 2 | 0.0 |
| Valid ballots | | 26,182 | 100.0 |
| Invalid or blank votes | | 1,240 | 4.7 |
| Total votes | | 26,182 | 100.0 |
| Turnout | | | 10.7 |
| Democratic hold | | | |
