= Emanuel Pleitez =

American politician and investor

Emanuel A. Pleitez
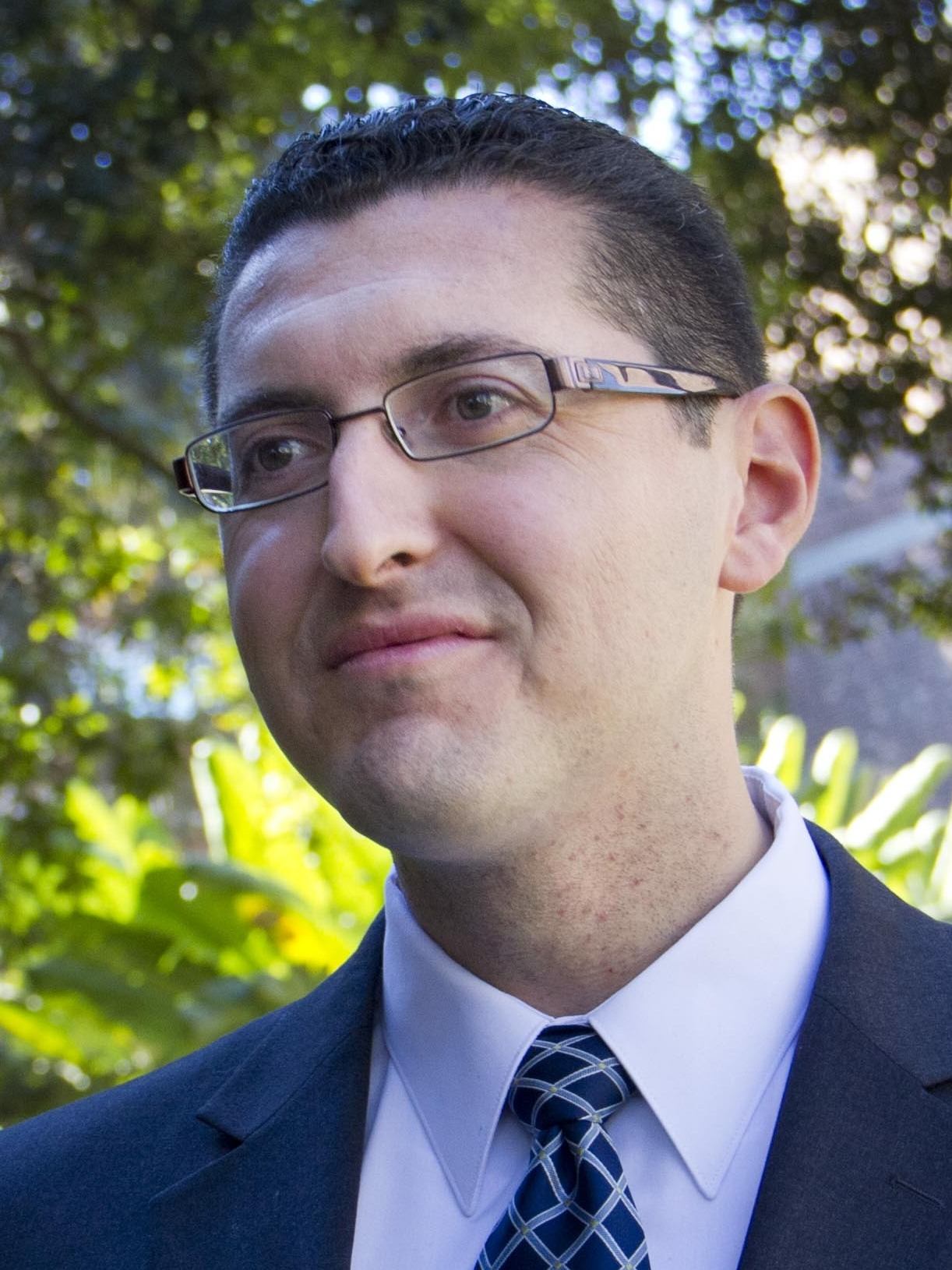
- Pleitez in 2013
- Born: December 15, 1982 (age 43); Los Angeles, California, United States
- Education: Woodrow Wilson High School; Stanford University
- Occupation: Investor
- Years active: 2015–present
- Spouse: Rebecca Pleitez (m. 2011)
- Website: www.pleitezgroup.com

Emanuel Alberto Pleitez (born December 15, 1982) is an American politician and investor, best known for his candidacy in the 2013 Los Angeles mayoral election. Born and raised in South and East Los Angeles, Pleitez was the first of his family to attend college, graduating from Stanford University in 2006. A combat veteran, he continues to serve in the United States Army Reserve. He is currently Chairman of the Hispanic Heritage Foundation and founder of East Los Capital, a technology-enabled private equity firm based in Los Angeles.

== Early life and education ==
Pleitez was born in South Los Angeles and raised in the Eastside neighborhood of El Sereno. He is the son of Mexican and Salvadoran immigrants and was brought up along with his younger sister by their single mother.

He attended Woodrow Wilson High School in El Sereno, where he was elected senior class president, earned 19 varsity letters, and received several academic scholarships.

At Stanford University, Pleitez was involved in several student organizations, including the Hispanic Undergraduate Business Association, ASSU student government, and Alpha Kappa Psi, a professional business fraternity. He also took time off from school to work in the political field, serving as a field organizer on John Kerry's presidential campaign and as a special assistant to then-councilman Antonio Villaraigosa during his 2005 mayoral race. Pleitez was honored with the Jerry I. Porras Visionary Leadership Award and the Cecilia and Tony Burciaga Community Development Award. He graduated with a B.A. in urban studies in 2006.

== Career ==
=== Finance and government ===
Beginning in 2007, Pleitez worked as a financial analyst at Goldman Sachs. He left the firm after Barack Obama was elected president in 2008, having been selected to serve on the Obama-Biden Presidential Transition Team, where he worked specifically on the Treasury Department agency review.

Following the transition, Pleitez ran for Congress in the 32nd District of California, competing against Gil Cedillo and Judy Chu. After that campaign concluded in May 2009, he was appointed as special assistant to chairman Paul Volcker on the President's Economic Recovery Advisory Board (PERAB), where he "delivered recommendations to President Obama on workforce development, tax reform, financial regulatory reform, infrastructure financing, and residential retrofitting."

=== Consulting and technology ===
In August 2010, Pleitez left his government position to work as a management consultant in the Los Angeles office of McKinsey and Company. In February 2012 he left McKinsey to become chief strategy officer of Spokeo, a privately held technology company based in Pasadena.

After Spokeo, Pleitez served as a Commissioner for the Los Angeles Fire and Police Pensions and as Head of Strategy and Business Development for Qlovi, an education technology startup. He resigned from the pension commission to train with the U.S. Army Reserve.

=== Private equity ===
After completing Army training, Pleitez joined the investment team at Sunstone Partners, a Silicon Valley–based private equity firm focused on growth buyout investments in technology-enabled services companies. He subsequently founded East Los Capital, a technology-enabled private equity firm.

Pleitez has been quoted in the financial press on topics including pension fund allocations to hedge funds, the impact of COVID-19 on private equity and venture capital portfolio companies, private equity dry powder and its limits as an economic stabilizer, venture capital–backed companies turning to non-bank lenders during the COVID-19 downturn, and diversity in venture capital and the role of public pension funds.

== Political career ==
=== 2009 congressional race ===
Following his work on the Obama-Biden Presidential Transition Team, Pleitez ran for the congressional seat representing the 32nd District of California against Gil Cedillo and Judy Chu. The campaign concluded in May 2009.

=== 2013 Los Angeles mayoral candidacy ===
Pleitez announced his candidacy for Mayor of Los Angeles in July 2012. He cited a "void in the field of candidates" and a desire to "inspire and reenergize LA" and to "represent those voices asking for integrity, hard work, and fair representation of all Angelenos" as his reasons for running.

Pleitez was one of two Latino candidates in the race and described his campaign as competitive and unconventional. On January 3, 2013, he qualified for City of Los Angeles matching campaign funds, having raised $150,000 in qualifying contributions by December 31, 2012.

Pleitez did not advance to the runoff, finishing fifth with 15,263 votes, or 4% of the primary vote.

== Nonprofit work ==
Pleitez has been involved in numerous charitable and nonprofit endeavors. While at Stanford, he served as program coordinator for El Centro Chicano. He currently chairs the Hispanic Heritage Foundation. From 2008 to 2014 he served on the board of the Salvadoran American Leadership and Educational Fund (SALEF), including a term as chairman. In 2009, he worked as a development assistant with the United Farm Workers Foundation.

In 2011, Pleitez founded Inspira, a web series featuring inspirational stories of Latino leaders, serving as executive producer and host alongside Gabriela Fresquez. He has also served as an advisor to the New Leaders Council, No Labels, and the Woodrow Wilson High School Alumni Foundation. In 2013, he joined the board of directors of California Children's Academy.
