= 2009 California elections =

- May 19, 2009
- Registered: 17,153,012
- Turnout: 28.40%

Elections were held in California on May 19, 2009. The elections were authorized by the State Legislature and Governor Arnold Schwarzenegger as a part of a budget signed into law on February 19, 2009. Voters voted on six ballot propositions, 1A through 1F, for the open 26th State Senate district seat, and in a primary for the open 32nd congressional district seat. All of the propositions except 1F were defeated.

== Background ==
In February 2009 the State Legislature narrowly passed the 2008–2009 state budget during a special session, months after it was due. As part of the plan to lower the state's annual deficits, the State Legislature ordered a special election with various budget reform ballot propositions.

== Propositions ==
=== Proposition 1A ===

Proposition 1A was a constitutional amendment that would have increased the annual contributions to the state's rainy day fund.

Proposition 1A
| Choice | Votes | % |
|---|---|---|
| For | 1,668,216 | 34.61 |
| Against | 3,152,141 | 65.39 |
| Total | 4,820,357 | 100.00 |
| Valid votes | 4,820,357 | 98.94 |
| Invalid/blank votes | 51,588 | 1.06 |
| Total votes | 4,871,945 | 100.00 |
| Registered voters/turnout | 17,153,012 | 28.40 |

=== Proposition 1B ===

Proposition 1B would have secured additional funding for primary education, but only if Proposition 1A passed as well.

Proposition 1B
| Choice | Votes | % |
|---|---|---|
| For | 1,834,242 | 38.14 |
| Against | 2,975,560 | 61.86 |
| Total | 4,809,802 | 100.00 |
| Valid votes | 4,809,802 | 98.72 |
| Invalid/blank votes | 62,143 | 1.28 |
| Total votes | 4,871,945 | 100.00 |
| Registered voters/turnout | 17,153,012 | 28.40 |

=== Proposition 1C ===

Proposition 1C was a constitutional amendment that would have made significant changes to the operation of the State Lottery.

Proposition 1C
| Choice | Votes | % |
|---|---|---|
| For | 1,708,800 | 35.65 |
| Against | 3,085,138 | 64.35 |
| Total | 4,793,938 | 100.00 |
| Valid votes | 4,793,938 | 98.40 |
| Invalid/blank votes | 78,007 | 1.60 |
| Total votes | 4,871,945 | 100.00 |
| Registered voters/turnout | 17,153,012 | 28.40 |

=== Proposition 1D ===

Proposition 1D would have authorized a one-time reallocation of tobacco tax revenue to help balance the state budget.

Proposition 1D
| Choice | Votes | % |
|---|---|---|
| For | 1,633,107 | 34.09 |
| Against | 3,157,680 | 65.91 |
| Total | 4,790,787 | 100.00 |
| Valid votes | 4,790,787 | 98.33 |
| Invalid/blank votes | 81,158 | 1.67 |
| Total votes | 4,871,945 | 100.00 |
| Registered voters/turnout | 17,153,012 | 28.40 |

=== Proposition 1E ===

Proposition 1E would have authorized a one-time reallocation of income tax revenue to help balance the state budget.

Proposition 1E
| Choice | Votes | % |
|---|---|---|
| For | 1,597,907 | 33.52 |
| Against | 3,169,163 | 66.48 |
| Total | 4,767,070 | 100.00 |
| Valid votes | 4,767,070 | 97.85 |
| Invalid/blank votes | 104,875 | 2.15 |
| Total votes | 4,871,945 | 100.00 |
| Registered voters/turnout | 17,153,012 | 28.40 |

=== Proposition 1F ===

Proposition 1F prohibited pay raises for members of the State Legislature, the Governor, and other state officials during deficit years.

Proposition 1F
| Choice | Votes | % |
|---|---|---|
| For | 3,565,419 | 74.23 |
| Against | 1,237,694 | 25.77 |
| Total | 4,803,113 | 100.00 |
| Valid votes | 4,803,113 | 98.59 |
| Invalid/blank votes | 68,832 | 1.41 |
| Total votes | 4,871,945 | 100.00 |
| Registered voters/turnout | 17,153,012 | 28.40 |

== Opinion polling ==
Field Poll: March 3, 2009

Among likely voters:
| Proposition | Yes | No |
|---|---|---|
| 1A | 57% | 21% |
| 1B | 53% | 30% |
| 1C | 47% | 39% |
| 1D | 54% | 24% |
| 1E | 57% | 23% |
| 1F | 77% | 13% |

SurveyUSA Poll: March 11–12, 2009 (commissioned by KABC-TV, KFSN-TV, KGTV-TV, and KPIX-TV)

Among likely voters:
| Proposition | Yes | No |
|---|---|---|
| 1A | 27% | 29% |
| 1B | 38% | 30% |
| 1C | 28% | 29% |
| 1D | 40% | 28% |
| 1E | 36% | 30% |
| 1F | 27% | 31% |

PPIC Poll: March 25, 2009

Among likely voters:
| Proposition | Yes | No |
|---|---|---|
| 1A | 39% | 46% |
| 1B | 44% | 41% |
| 1C | 37% | 50% |
| 1D | 48% | 36% |
| 1E | 47% | 37% |
| 1F | 81% | 13% |

SurveyUSA Poll: April 20–21, 2009 (commissioned by KABC-TV, KFSN-TV, KGTV-TV, and KPIX-TV)

Among likely voters:
| Proposition | Yes | No |
|---|---|---|
| 1A | 29% | 42% |
| 1B | 37% | 42% |
| 1C | 23% | 41% |
| 1D | 37% | 39% |
| 1E | 32% | 41% |
| 1F | 32% | 34% |

Field Poll: April 29, 2009

Among likely voters:
| Proposition | Yes | No |
|---|---|---|
| 1A | 40% | 49% |
| 1B | 40% | 49% |
| 1C | 32% | 59% |
| 1D | 40% | 49% |
| 1E | 40% | 51% |
| 1F | 71% | 24% |

== 26th State Senate district special election ==
A special election to fill the 26th district of the State Senate was called by Governor Schwarzenegger on December 10, 2008, as a consequence of the resignation of former State Senator Mark Ridley-Thomas following his election to the Los Angeles County Board of Supervisors. A special primary election was held on March 24, 2009, and the special election was held on May 19, 2009.

=== Candidates ===
A total of eight candidates registered for the special election, but only three qualified for the special election:

==== Democratic ====
- Robert Cole, a member of the Los Angeles County Citizens' Economy and Efficiency Committee
- Mike Davis, the State Assemblymember from the 48th district
- Saundra Davis, a board member of the Culver City Unified School District and a businesswoman
- Mervin Leon Evans, an author and management consultant
- Jonathan Friedman, a financial analyst
- Curren D. Price, Jr., the State Assemblymember from the 51st district

==== Peace and Freedom ====
- Cindy Variela Henderson, a communications technician

==== Republican ====
- Nachum Shifren, an educator

=== Primary election ===
An open primary election for the special election was held on March 24, 2009. Since no candidate won a majority, the candidates with the top votes for each party advanced to the special general election. Price won more votes than any other Democrat while Shifren and Henderson were the only candidates of their parties.

California's 26th State Senate district special primary, 2009
| Party | Candidate | Votes | % |
|---|---|---|---|
| Democratic | Curren Price | 10,864 | 35.84 |
| Democratic | Mike Davis | 6,471 | 21.35 |
| Democratic | Robert Cole | 4,160 | 13.72 |
| Republican | Nachum Shifren | 3,371 | 11.12 |
| Democratic | Jonathan Friedman | 2,497 | 8.24 |
| Democratic | Saundra Davis | 2,262 | 7.46 |
| Peace and Freedom | Cindy Henderson | 525 | 1.73 |
| Democratic | Mervin Evans | 165 | 0.54 |
| Valid ballots | | 30,315 | 98.19 |
| Invalid or blank votes | | 558 | 1.81 |
| Total votes | | 30,873 | 100.00 |
| Turnout | | | 7.91 |

=== Special election ===
In the special runoff election, Democratic Curren Price won by a large margin, beating Republican Nachum Schifren and Peace and Freedom Party candidate Cindy Henderson.

California's 26th State Senate district special election, 2009
| Party | Candidate | Votes | % |
|---|---|---|---|
| Democratic | Curren Price | 37,677 | 70.72 |
| Republican | Nachum Shifren | 11,097 | 20.83 |
| Peace and Freedom | Cindy Henderson | 4,501 | 8.45 |
| Valid ballots | | 53,275 | 83.24 |
| Invalid or blank votes | | 10,726 | 16.76 |
| Total votes | | 64,001 | 100.00 |
| Turnout | | | 18.59 |
| Democratic hold | | | |

== 32nd congressional district special primary election ==
A special election to fill the 32nd congressional district was called by Governor Schwarzenegger on March 10, 2009, as a consequence of the resignation of former Congresswoman Hilda Solis following her appointment as United States Secretary of Labor. The special primary election was May 19, 2009 while the special election was held on July 14, 2009. The election was won by Democrat Judy Chu, who became the first Chinese American woman elected to serve in Congress.

=== Primary election ===
In the May 19 primary, Democrat Judy Chu led all candidates, but failed to gain enough to prevent a runoff general election. Betty Chu qualified as the Republican candidate for the runoff and Christopher Agrella qualified as the Libertarian.

California's 32nd congressional district special primary, 2009
| Party | Candidate | Votes | % |
|---|---|---|---|
| Democratic | Judy Chu | 17,661 | 32.64 |
| Democratic | Gil Cedillo | 12,570 | 23.23 |
| Democratic | Emanuel Pleitez | 7,252 | 13.40 |
| Republican | Betty Chu | 5,648 | 10.44 |
| Republican | Teresa Hernandez | 4,581 | 8.47 |
| Republican | David Truax | 3,303 | 6.10 |
| Democratic | Francisco Alonso | 1,097 | 2.03 |
| Libertarian | Christopher Agrella | 654 | 1.21 |
| Democratic | Benita Duran | 659 | 1.22 |
| Democratic | Stefan Lysenko | 246 | 0.45 |
| Democratic | Nick Mostert | 244 | 0.45 |
| Democratic | Rafael Nadal | 200 | 0.37 |
| Republican | Larry Scarborough (write-in) | 1 | 0.00 |
| Valid ballots | | 54,116 | 94.57 |
| Invalid or blank votes | | 3,106 | 5.43 |
| Total votes | | 57,222 | 100.00 |
| Turnout | | | 26.21 |

=== Special election ===
In the special runoff election, Democratic Judy Chu won by a significant margin, beating Republican Betty Chu and Libertarian candidate Christopher Agrella.

California's 32nd congressional district special election, 2009
| Party | Candidate | Votes | % |
|---|---|---|---|
| Democratic | Judy Chu | 16,194 | 61.85 |
| Republican | Betty Chu | 8,630 | 32.96 |
| Libertarian | Christopher Agrella | 1,356 | 5.18 |
| Independent | Eleanor Garcia (write-in) | 2 | 0.01 |
| Valid ballots | | 26,182 | 98.99 |
| Invalid or blank votes | | 267 | 1.01 |
| Total votes | | 26,449 | 100.00 |
| Turnout | | | 10.79 |
| Democratic hold | | | |
