= 2013 Los Angeles mayoral election =

- March 5 and May 21, 2013
- Turnout: 23.0%
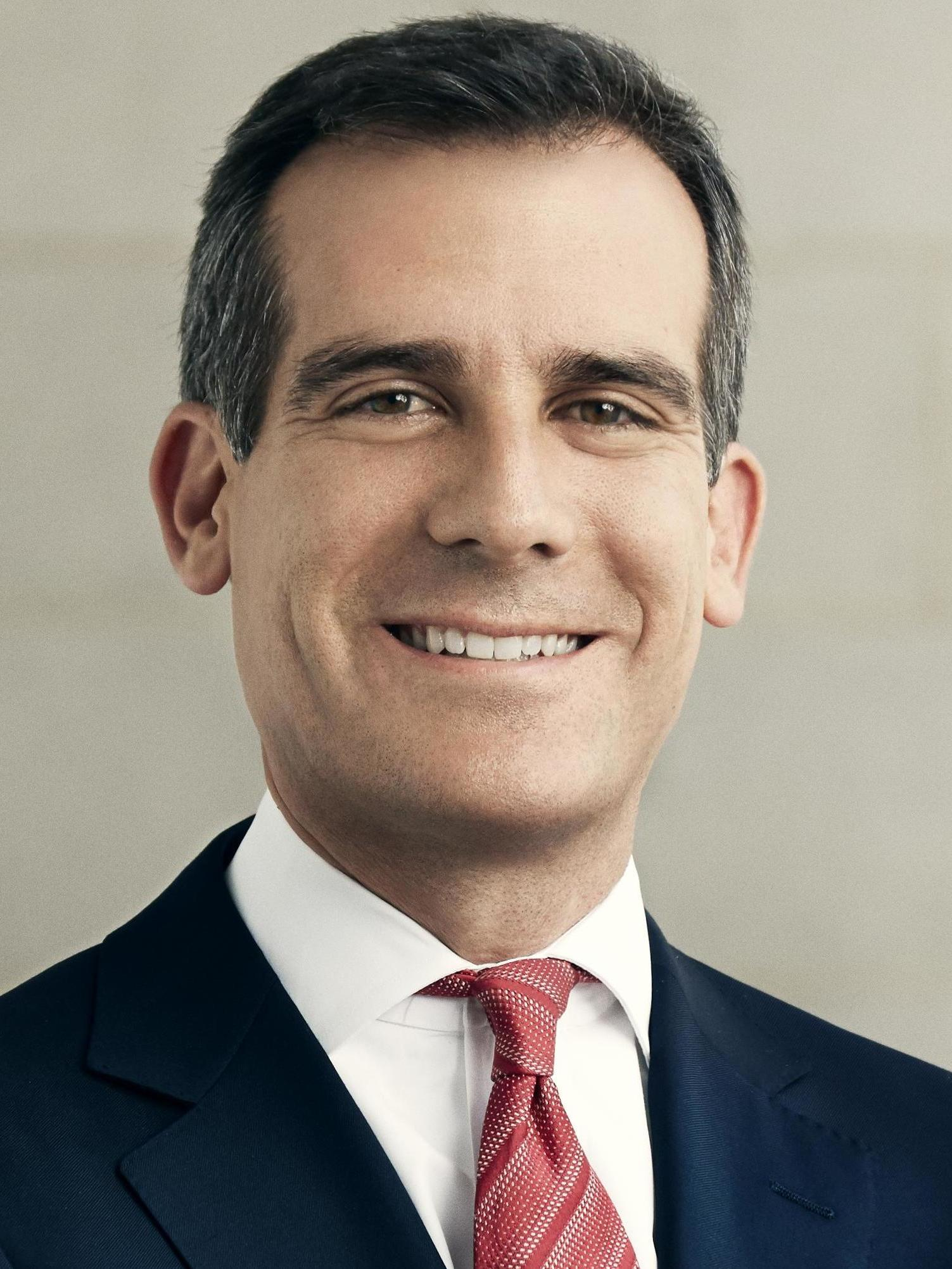

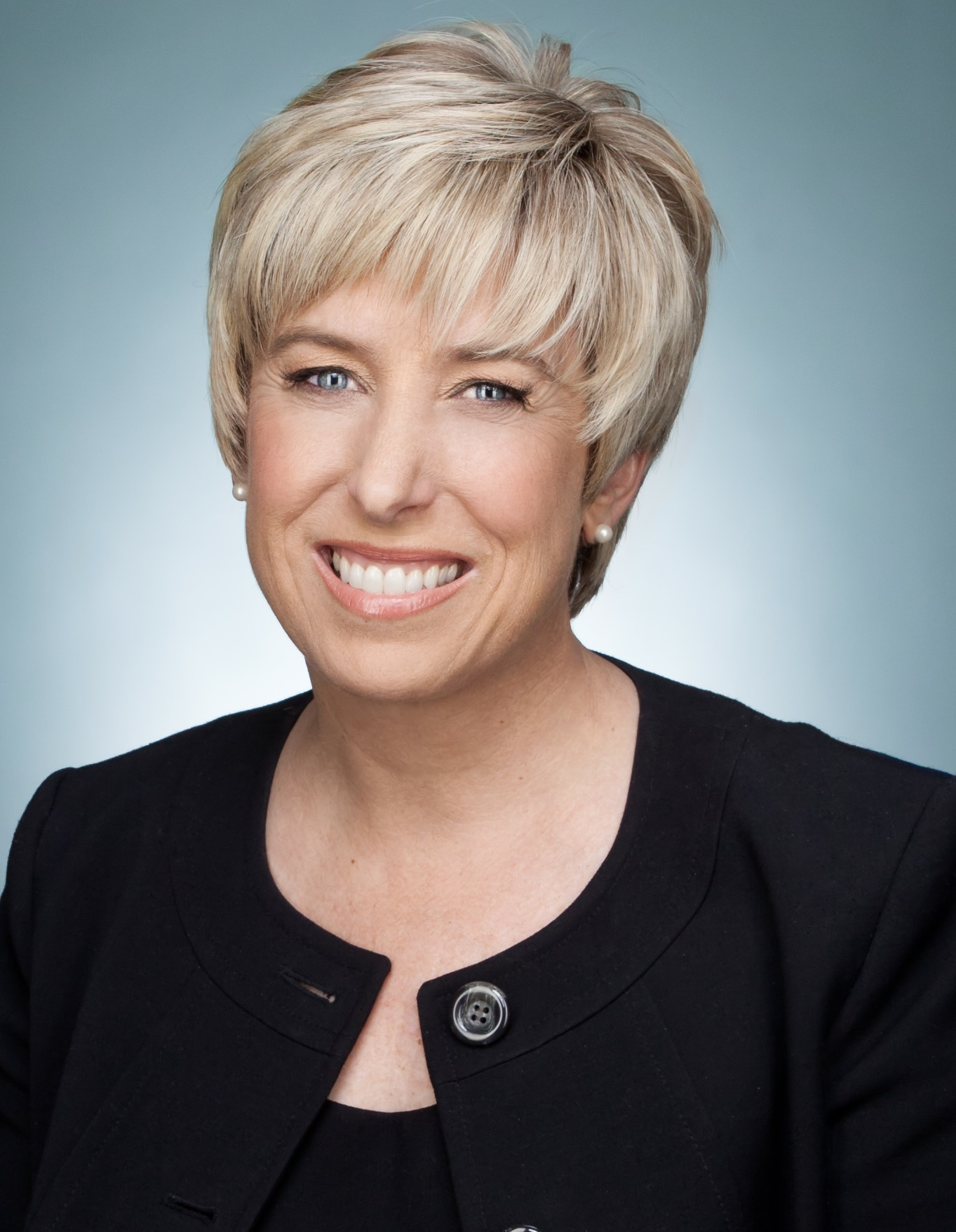

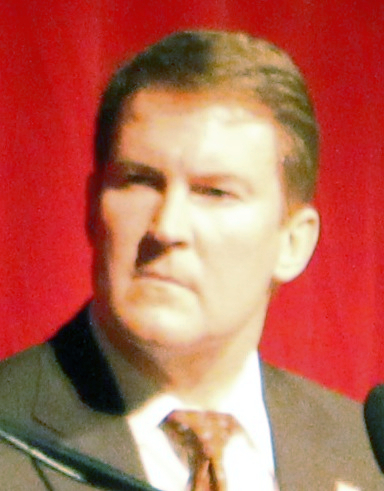

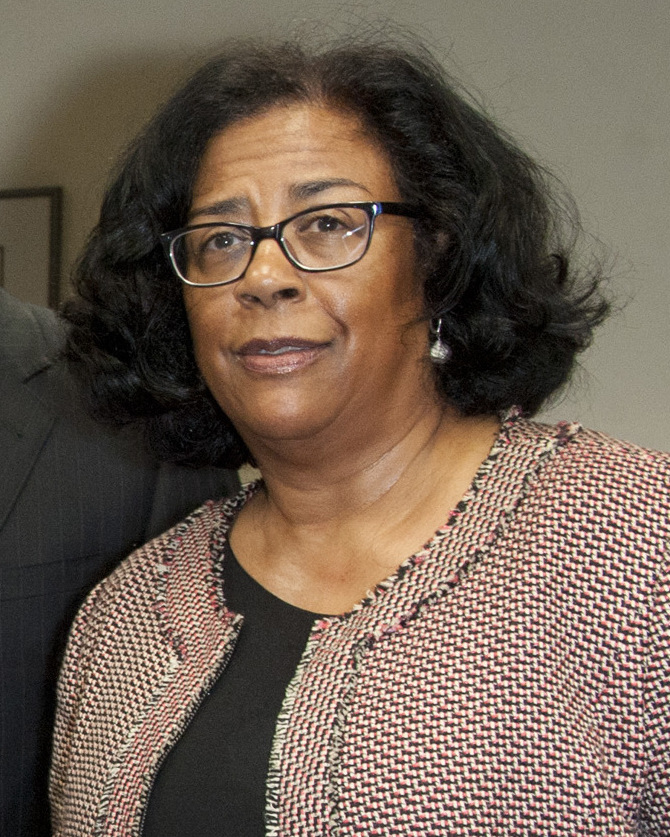
Candidate	Eric Garcetti	Wendy Greuel
First round	121,930; 32.27%	106,748; 28.25%
Runoff	222,300; 54.23%	187,609; 45.77%
Candidate	Kevin James	Jan Perry
First round	60,164; 15.92%	58,472; 15.47%
Runoff	Eliminated	Eliminated
- Results by city council district Garcetti: 50–60% 60–70% Greuel: 50–60% 60–70%
Mayor before election
Antonio Villaraigosa
Elected Mayor
Eric Garcetti

An election was held on March 5, 2013, to elect the mayor of Los Angeles. No candidate received a majority of the primary votes to be elected outright, and the top two finishers, Eric Garcetti and Wendy Greuel advanced to a runoff vote. On May 21, 2013, Garcetti was elected mayor with a majority of the votes in the runoff.

Municipal elections in California are officially non-partisan, but candidates receive support and endorsements from their respective parties or affiliated organizations.

Incumbent mayor Antonio Villaraigosa was ineligible to run for re-election because of term limits.

== Nonpartisan primary ==
=== Candidates ===
==== Advanced to runoff ====
- Eric Garcetti, city councilman from the 13th district and former city council president (voter registration: Democratic)
- Wendy Greuel, city controller and former city councilwoman for the 2nd district (voter registration: Democratic)

==== Eliminated in primary ====
- Yehuda "YJ" Draiman, businessman, member of the Northridge East Neighborhood Council, and father of David Draiman
- Kevin James, talk radio host and attorney (voter registration: Republican)
- Addie M. Miller, citywide advocate
- Jan Perry, city councilmember from the 9th district (voter registration: Democratic) (endorsed Garcetti)
- Emanuel Pleitez, chief strategy officer at Spokeo and former Villaraigosa aide (voter registration: Democratic)
- Norton Sandler, factory worker (voter registration: Socialist Workers Party)

==== Withdrawn ====
- Austin Beutner, Los Angeles Times publisher and former deputy mayor

==== Declined ====
- Rick J. Caruso, mall developer (voter registration: Republican)
- Alex Padilla, state senator for the 20th district (voter registration: Democratic)
- Zev Yaroslavsky, county supervisor for the 3rd district (voter registration: Democratic)

=== Campaign ===
Both the Los Angeles Times and Los Angeles Daily News suggested that the fiscal state of Los Angeles would likely play a major role in the election. Also a question was the role that Villaraigosa's popularity would play; in 2009 his support was seen as more of a liability than an asset.

=== Endorsements ===
Eric Garcetti

Newspapers

- Los Angeles Times

=== Polling ===
Graphical summary

View source data.

Poll source	Date(s) administered	Sample size	Margin of error	Yehuda Draiman	Eric Garcetti	Wendy Greuel	Kevin James	Addie Miller	Jan Perry	Emanuel Pleitez	Norton Sandler	Other	Undecided
SurveyUSA	February 28–March 3, 2013	541	± 4.3%	1%	26%	28%	15%	1%	12%	9%	1%	—	7%
USC/LA Times	February 24–27, 2013	500	± 4%	—	27%	25%	15%	—	14%	5%	—	1%	14%
SurveyUSA	February 14–17, 2013	509	± 4.4%	1%	26%	23%	14%	3%	12%	6%	2%	—	13%
SurveyUSA	January 28–30, 2013	429	± 4.8%	3%	24%	20%	12%	3%	15%	7%	2%	—	15%
SurveyUSA	January 12–15, 2013	544	± 4.3%	2%	26%	18%	12%	3%	12%	4%	2%	—	20%

=== Results ===
Mayoral election results, March 5, 2013
Candidate	Votes	%
Eric Garcetti	121,930	33.1%
Wendy Greuel	106,748	29.0%
Kevin James	60,164	16.3%
Jan Perry	58,472	15.9%
Emanuel Pleitez	15,263	4.1%
Norton Sandler	2,002	0.5%
Addie Miller	1,810	0.5%
YJ Draiman	1,543	0.4%
Total votes	377,881	100%

== Runoff ==
=== Endorsements ===
Eric Garcetti

State legislators

- Paul Koretz, former state assemblyman from the 42nd district (2000–2006) and city councilman from the 5th district (2009–2022)

Local officials

- Joe Buscaino, city councilman from the 15th district (2012–2022)
- Paul Krekorian, city councilman from the 2nd district (2010–2024)
- Jan Perry, city councilmember from the 9th district (2001–2013)

Newspapers

- TechCrunch
Wendy Greuel

Executive branch officials

- Bill Clinton, former president of the United States (1993–2001)

Local officials

- Mark Ridley-Thomas, former city councilmember from the 8th district (1991–2002) and member of the Los Angeles County Board of Supervisors from the 2nd district (2008–2020)
- Richard Riordan, former mayor of Los Angeles (1993–2001)

Individuals

- Magic Johnson, former Los Angeles Lakers basketballer

Labor unions

- Los Angeles County Federation of Labor

=== Polling ===
Graphical summary

View source data.

Poll source	Date(s) administered	Sample size	Margin of error	Eric Garcetti	Wendy Greuel	Undecided
SurveyUSA	May 15–18, 2013	573	± 4.2%	49%	44%	7%
USC Price/Los Angeles Times	May 14–16, 2013	500	± 4.4%	48%	41%	11%
SurveyUSA	May 5–8, 2013	556	± 4.2%	46%	46%	8%
Brown/Cal State	April 29–May 7, 2013	674	± 4%	45%	46%	9%
Working Californians	April 25–28, 2013	705	± 3.7%	39%	38%	23%
SurveyUSA	April 22–25, 2013	486	± 4.5%	42%	45%	13%
USC Price/Los Angeles Times	April 15–17, 2013	500	± 4.4%	50.3%	40%	10%
SurveyUSA	April 8–10, 2013	478	± 4.6%	49%	40%	11%
SurveyUSA	March 23–26, 2013	523	± 4.4%	47%	40%	13%

=== Results ===
Mayoral runoff results, May 21, 2013
Candidate	Votes	%	±
Eric Garcetti	222,300	54.23%	N/A
Wendy Greuel	187,609	45.77%	N/A
Total votes	409,909	100%	N/A
