= People search site =

Specialized search engine

A people search site or people finder site is a specialized search engine that searches information from public records, data brokers and other sources to compile reports about individual people, usually for a fee.

Early examples of people search sites included Classmates.com, Switchboard.com, and Whitepages.com. With the rise of social media networks, sites like PeopleFinders.com, Spokeo, BeenVerified, and Truthfinder began to aggregate social media profile information alongside other personal data, allowing searches by username and email address. Some modern search services combine people search with image-based identification, including platforms such as PimEyes, Clearview AI, and Lenso.ai, which analyze publicly available images to locate matching visual content.

== See also ==
- List of search engines
