= NumberGuru =

Application to look up phone numbers

- Developer: BeenVerified
- Release: 2011
- Stable release: Version 1.1.9 / 8 February 2014; 12 years ago
- Website: www.numberguru.com

NumberGuru is a website and smartphone application that allows users to look up the owner of an entered telephone number. Developed by BeenVerified, it can be accessed through its website and smartphone applications for iPhone, Windows Mobile, and Android. It aggregates 99% of landline phones and approximately 50% of domestic cell phones. It also collects data on toll-free and telemarketing callers. It was reported that it averaged approximately 864,000 look-ups per day shortly after its launch in May 2011. It was also listed as a Top 10 Utility App and Top 150 Free Apps Overall by App Annie.

NumberGuru works by entering the telephone number that the user wishes to find information on. The owner's name, phone carrier, location, and type of phone are returned in the results. It also allows user to enter information about business or marketer numbers such as spam reports. Comments from other users who have looked up the same number are displayed with the results. The Android mobile application can also be connected to a users phone book and a notification will be made at the time of a call if it is a known number from the user's contacts or a marketer or spam call.

== See also ==
- Reverse telephone directory
