= PimEyes =

Facial recognition search website

- Established: 2017 (9 years ago)
- Owners: Giorgi Gobronidze
- Employees: 12 (2023)

PimEyes is a facial recognition search website that allows users to find images on the internet of a person given a sample image. The website is owned by EMEARobotics, a corporation based in Dubai. The owner and CEO of EMEARobotics and PimEye is Giorgi Gobronidze, who is based in Tbilisi, Georgia.

== History ==
PimEyes was launched in 2017 by a Polish start-up owned by its creators, Polish software engineers Lucasz (also Lukasz) Kowalczyk and Denis Tatina. In 2017, Giorgi Gobronidze, a Georgian law academic, met the website's creators at a university in Poland. He said he used the website for academic research.

In 2020, the PimEyes brand was purchased by the shell corporation Face Recognition Solutions Ltd, moving the website's headquarter from Poland to Seychelles, a popular tax haven. It was marketed as a cyberstalking tool to use on photos of celebrities.

In December 2021, Gobronidze said he purchased the website from an anonymous owner, using a shell corporation he registered in Dubai that same month.

According to a lawsuit filed in Edwardsville, Illinois, United States, alleging violations of the Biometric Information Privacy Act, corporations legally linked to the PimEyes brand include Pimeyes Sp. Z O.O, Transaction Cloud, Inc., Carribex LTD., and Public Mirror SP. Z O.O. Carribex LTD is based in Belize, and is used as the contact for questions about PimEyes' rules.

=== Legal inquiries and lawsuits ===
PimEyes has been the subject of legal inquiries and lawsuits in Europe and the United States. In November 2022, the privacy advocacy group Big Brother Watch filed a complaint with the United Kingdom's data and privacy watchdog.

In December 2022, Germany's privacy watchdog opened proceedings against PimEyes.

In May 2023, five plaintiffs filed a privacy lawsuit against PimEyes in Illinois, United States.

== Criticism ==
The German news site netzpolitik.org has criticized PimEyes for its potential for abuse, its moving location and queries by a German data security official, the related service Public Mirror by the initial founders of Pimeyes, its new owner and open questions by the German data security official.

Students at Harvard University used PimEyes on Ray-Ban Meta to identify someone's name from a face and then performed a lookup on a people search sites with that name to identify personal information (including names, phone numbers and home address) in real time. The software has been used by doxing social media accounts.

=== Privacy of children ===
PimEyes has been criticized for the ability for users to search for children and the return of potential explicit material containing children. In October 2023, PimEyes launched age-detection algorithms blocking the search of images of children.
