= Kevin James (broadcaster) =

American broadcaster and politician

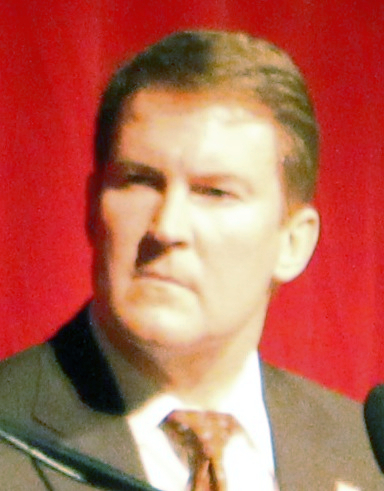
- James in 2013

President, Los Angeles Board of Public Works
- In office July 1, 2013 – December 12, 2022

Director, Los Angeles Mayor's Office of Film and Television
- In office March 2015 – December 12, 2022

Personal details
- Born: 1963 (age 62–63)
- Party: Democratic (until 2002; 2019–present)
- Other political affiliations: Republican (2007–2019); Independent (2002–2007)
- Education: University of Oklahoma; University of Houston Law Center

Kevin Lee James (born 1963) is an American radio host and political commentator, focused on local and national politics. He was a candidate in the 2013 Los Angeles mayoral election and a former Assistant U.S. Attorney for Southern California. His program aired on KRLA AM 870 in Los Angeles between 12 a.m. and 3 a.m. on weekdays.

He was appointed by Mayor of Los Angeles Eric Garcetti as President of the Los Angeles Board of Public Works, in 2013. James continues to serve in that role and as Director of the Los Angeles Mayor's Office of Film and Television since 2015.

== Early life ==
James earned an undergraduate degree from the University of Oklahoma where he was a President's Leadership Scholar and attended the University of Houston Law Center. He is a member of the California State Bar.

== Career ==
=== Assistant U.S. Attorney ===
James worked for three years as an Assistant U.S. Attorney, prosecuting federal crimes. During his tenure as assistant U.S. Attorney, James received the Director's Award for Superior Performance. He also worked for more than 20 years in private practice, representing entertainment industry clients.

=== Talk show host ===
After several years as a guest and substitute host for talk radio programs in Los Angeles, James worked as the morning drive host on KTOK AM 1000 in Oklahoma City in 2004. In 2005, James became the host of Red Eye Radio, an overnight (1 a.m. to 5 a.m.) call-in program on KABC (AM) 790 in Los Angeles. He focused on both local and national issues. Over Memorial Day Weekend 2007, James began hosting The Kevin James Show on KRLA AM 870 in Los Angeles.

James also appears as a guest commentator on television news programs. He was a regular on Court TV’s now-cancelled Catherine Crier Live and appeared numerous times on Hardball with Chris Matthews.

In 2010 James announced a neighborhood council tour in which he would visit over 45 neighborhood councils all across Los Angeles, taking their issues of concern directly to the airwaves. He launched TeamKevinJames, a website for his listener audience to follow his neighborhood council tour schedule and other local activity, learn his issues of top concern and communicate with him regularly. Since 2010 James has been supportive and involved with LA Clean Sweep, a non-partisan grassroots citywide coalition of community groups and activists working for change at City Hall in Los Angeles.

== Political career ==
=== 2013 Los Angeles mayoral run ===
James was a candidate for the 2013 Los Angeles mayoral election. James's campaign focused on fiscal accountability and transparency, including delegating power to the neighborhood councils and reducing business taxation. To further support his campaign focus in regards to transparency, James reminded Angelenos of a recent controversy which took place at the Los Angeles Memorial Coliseum. He would have been the first openly gay mayor of Los Angeles. He finished third in the mayoral race held on March 5, 2013, in which only the top two candidates advanced to a runoff election.

=== President of the Los Angeles Board of Public Works ===
In July 2013, Los Angeles Mayor Eric Garcetti appointed his one-time mayoral rival Kevin James to a key City Hall position, giving him a job as a commissioner on the Board of Public Works. James, who decried City Hall corruption and incompetence during his bid for Los Angeles mayor earlier in the year, said he would focus on street improvements and sidewalks in his new position. The commissioners meet three times a week at City Hall and serve collectively as the general managers of the Department of Public Works, which oversees city services such as lighting, beautification and street services. James was then chosen unanimously to preside over the powerful five-member board as president.

=== Director of the Los Angeles Mayor's Office of Film and Television ===
In March 2015, Los Angeles Mayor Eric Garcetti named Kevin James to the post of chief film liaison. James continues to serve in his role as President of the Board of Public Works, and is also now the City Hall point person on film and TV production. James is openly gay.

=== Candidate for Los Angeles City Attorney in 2022 ===
James ran for the open seat of the Los Angeles City Attorney in 2022. Although he secured endorsements and raised large amounts of money, he finished fifth in the June primary and did not advance to the general election.
