= BeenVerified =

Internet company specializing in making public records available online

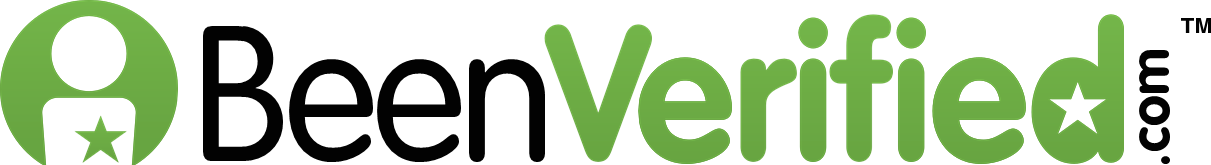
- Type: Privately held company
- Founded: March 2007; 19 years ago
- Founder: Josh Levy; Ross Cohen
- Headquarters: New York City, New York, U.S.
- Key people: Josh Levy, CEO; Ross Cohen, COO
- Products: People search site; Reverse telephone directory (Telephone number); Email; Address; Vehicle
- Revenue: ▲US$14.4 million (2023)
- Number of employees: ▲128 (2024)
- Website: www.beenverified.com

BeenVerified is a background check company that provides consumer initiated criminal background and people search services through its website for profit as well as its mobile application "Background Check App." The company also launched additional mobile applications including a reverse number look up called NumberGuru and a registered sex offender tracking app that uses augmented reality to locate sex offenders.

== History ==
Founded in 2007, Josh Levy and Ross Cohen launched BeenVerified in 2009 and began advertising on national television, as well as on the back of garbage trucks. Initially, the company included a service called StandOut that allowed people to check and verify their own background information to use as a marketing tool online in the form of an embeddable seal as well as see what information employers could potentially find out about them.

Levy and Cohen have discussed the company's pivot from originally focusing on the small business market to becoming a consumer-focused background check service in Inc. and CIO Magazine.

In 2009, BeenVerified launched an iPhone application called the Background Check App, allowing users to use the service on their iPhones. It was the second background check app for the iOS platform behind the DateCheck app launched by Intelius a year earlier.

In 2010, BeenVerified released a sex offender tracking app for both iOS and Android platforms. The app uses public records such as sex offender registries, geolocation services, and augmented reality to show users the location of sex offenders.

The company released another app in 2011 called "Number Guru", a free reverse phone number look up service.

BeenVerified ranked #26 on the Inc. 5000 list for 2013, including being named the fastest growing company in New York. The company reported revenues of $13.7 million in 2012.

In 2015, BeenVerified launched a caller ID and reverse phone lookup app for the Apple Watch.

== Services ==
BeenVerified uses traditional background methods in addition to Web 2.0 and social networking to return results to a requesting user. Users enter the name and/or email address of the person they are requesting information on and are given information from public records and other privately licensed databases of public record information. The Background Check App released allows users to run background checks with a smartphone. The app uses names and email addresses to run background checks through its website, with the capability of checking anyone in a user's contact list. The services at BeenVerified are not free, and users must pay for access through either a one- or three-month billing plan.

BeenVerified has an opt-out process for anyone wanting to remove their own information from the site. The company has also come under scrutiny in the past for its opt-out process and works with companies to remove their information upon request.
