= Betty Tom Chu =

American lawyer, banking CEO and former mayor (born 1936)

Betty Chu 趙譚美生
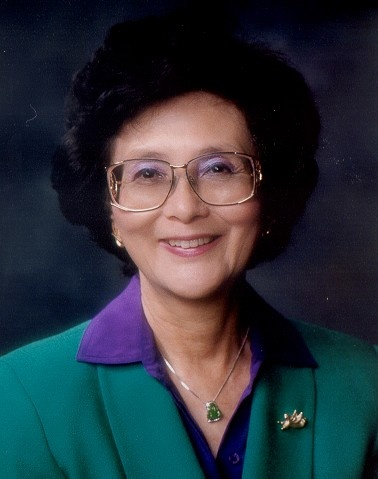

Mayor of Monterey Park
- In office March 13, 2006 – 2007
- Preceded by: Frank Venti
- Succeeded by: Frank Venti

Personal details
- Born: Betty Tom (譚美生); May 4, 1937 (age 89) San Diego, California, U.S.
- Party: Republican
- Spouse: Robert Chu
- Children: 3
- Education: University of Southern California (BS, JD)
- Known for: Co-Founder of East West Bank

Betty Tom Chu
- Traditional Chinese: 趙譚美生
- Simplified Chinese: 赵谭美生
Transcriptions
Standard Mandarin
- Hanyu Pinyin: Zhào-Tán Měishēng
Yue: Cantonese
- Jyutping: ziu6 taam4 mei5 saang1

Betty Tom Chu (born May 4, 1936) is an American lawyer, politician and banker. Chu was the first Chinese-American woman to pass the bar examination for admission to the State Bar of California. She was also the first Chinese-American woman to be the chief executive of a bank.

Chu served as mayor of Monterey Park, California in 2006, and held two elected terms on the city council between 2003 and 2012. She ran for the 32nd Congressional district as a Republican in May 2009, and lost to Judy Chu.

== Early life and education ==
Chu was born in San Diego, California. She was named Betty because it was the only English name her mother could pronounce. Her father, Tom Kay Chu, owned a farm on land inherited from his grandfather. Her paternal family was from Kaiping, while her mother, Yee Siu King, was an immigrant from Guangzhou. Chu was a farmhand for her family, but by age nine, Chu wanted to pursue a career in law as a working class advocate, after witnessing the beating of one of the migrant workers on her father's farm.

After graduating from Grossmont High School, she earned a Bachelor of Science and a Juris Doctor from University of Southern California.

== Career ==
In June 1961, Chu was admitted to the State Bar of California. In 1961, Chu became the first Chinese-American woman lawyer in Southern California. As a pioneer in the legal field, Chu's career was supported by Hiram Kwan, founder of "Kwan, Quan, Cohen, and Lum", a law firm in Los Angeles Chinatown.

In 1973, Chu was one of the founding members of East West Federal Bank (now East West Bancorp). Chu also co-founded Trust Saving Bank and served as its chairperson and CEO; she was the first Chinese American woman to run a bank in the United States.

She has taught classes at California College of Law and Los Angeles Community College.

In 1992, Chu was a member of the Los Angeles Police Department's Police Chief selection committee.

Chu was an elected city council member of Monterey Park, California from 2003 to 2007, and again from 2009 to 2012. On March 13, 2006, Chu was sworn in as the mayor of Monterey Park. In May 2009, Chu campaigned for the 32nd Congressional district as a Republican, but she lost to Judy Chu, her cousin by marriage.

In November 2010, Chu was one of several Chinese-American politicians to be invited to the 2010 Asian Games by the Overseas Chinese Affairs Office (OCAO). It had been her first visit since 1980, when she unsuccessfully tried to find her father's village. She and her husband were subsequently given tours of their ancestral homes in Guangdong through OCAO.

On June 11, 2012, Chu abruptly resigned from the city council and stated this was due to "philosophical differences" with other council members. According to the Pasadena Star News, she stated in a speech to the council: "Some other council members don’t spend adequate time reviewing staff reports and supporting documents … and it is evident from frequent 4-1 votes on key vital issues that facts don’t really matter because there is a deep political and philosophical divide."

On June 5, 2014, the California State Senate passed the Senate Joint Resolution 23 and 122, which is associated to formally apology for past California anti-Chinese legislation. This resolution passage is the work and request by The Apology for the Chinese Exclusion Act Committee, which Chu is one of the founding members. Chu is also the honorary chairperson of the Committee for the Monument Commemorating U.S.-China Military-Civilian Cooperation Against Aggression During World War II of the Overseas Community Affairs Council.

In 2016, Chu was an Alternate Delegate for the Republican National Convention.

In 2018, Chu partnered with John Gee and the Chinese American Citizens Alliance of Orange County to urge Congress to pass the Congressional Gold Medal for Chinese Americans who served in World War II. With the help of Congressman Ed Royce, she was able to successfully garner bipartisan support and the bill was signed into law by President Donald Trump on December 20, 2018.

Today, Chu is actively involved in local and national politics. She sits on the board of Asian Industry B2B which is founded by Marc Ang and the Chinese American Citizens Alliance of Orange County. She is also one of the key signers of the ballot argument against 2020 California Proposition 16 and sits as an Honorary Co-chair of Californians for Equal Rights alongside Ward Connerly, Tom Campbell, Gail Heriot, and Manuel Klausner.

== Personal life ==
She was married to civil engineer Robert Chu (赵国荣), who came to the United States at age six from Gujing in Xinhui, Jiangmen. The couple met in college and share three children. She currently resides in Orange County.

== Awards ==
- 2005 Honoree of Los Angeles Chinese American Pioneers in Law. (Chinese Historical Society of Southern California)

== See also ==
- Asian American and Pacific Islands American conservatism in the United States
- Chinese Exclusion Act
- Chinese Historical Society of Southern California
- List of first women lawyers and judges in California
