= PeopleFinders.com =

Public records business located in Sacramento, California

Coordinates: 38°34′11.2″N 121°29′5.6″W

PeopleFinders, Inc.
- Company type: Privately held company
- Industry: Data broker
- Genre: Electronic commerce
- Founded: May 22, 2002; 24 years ago
- Founder: Robert Miller
- Headquarters: Sacramento, California, U.S.
- Area served: United States
- Key people: Robert Miller, Founder and Chairman; Amber Higgins, CEO; Eddie Lau, VP of Information Technology
- Services: background checks, identity theft protection
- Website: peoplefinders.com

PeopleFinders.com is an American public records business located in Sacramento, California. The company offers a variety of public records including address histories, phone numbers and background checks.

== History ==
In 1999, Rob Miller founded PeopleFinders.

== Products and services ==
PeopleFinders is a people search company, providing individuals with various types of public records that will allow them to obtain contact information for most private citizens in the United States. In addition, PeopleFinders offers background checks, criminal records and a variety of other public records related to marriage, divorce, birth, death, bankruptcy, and property ownership. This data is collected from various sources, including government agencies, property records and other public records sources. Also in the interest of finding people, PeopleFinders offers a reverse phone lookup service that allows users to find people or businesses behind unknown phone numbers.

== Blog ==
The PeopleFinders Blog was launched in May 2009. This blog covered topics that are related to people searches, current events, how to obtain background checks and other public record reports, and other subjects of interest to their customers and the general public. New blog posts were typically published three times per week; every Monday, Wednesday, and Friday.

== Growth ==
In 2008 PeopleFinders was noted for being one of the fastest growing internet based companies. Deloitte, an independent firm that provides audit and consulting services, listed the company as number 24 in the Technology Fast 50 for the Silicon Valley. This ranking was based on the amount of revenue growth the company experienced between 2003 and 2007. Mark Jensen, Managing Partner, National Venture Capital Services, Deloitte & Touche LLP, stated that PeopleFinders was one of a very few companies to "accomplish such a fast growth rate over the past five years".

PeopleFinders was also listed as a Deloitte Fast 500 company in both 2008 and 2009. Since its inception, PeopleFinders grew from 9 employees to approximately 50 in 2009. As of 2020, the number of employees hovers around 75.
