= Stefan Lysenko =

Ukrainian American film maker

Stefan Lysenko is a Ukrainian American film maker.

== Career ==
Lysenko was brought up in California. During the 20 years after traveling the world in 1988/89, he became an actor, writer, editor, director and independent filmmaker.

In the early 1990s he studied acting at the Playhouse West School and Repertory Theatre. After appearing in a number of New York productions, "Twilight Cafe" EST Theatre New York 1993 and "The Seagull" Actors Theatre, New York 1993.

He studied at the Actors Studio under the tutelage of Shelley Winters.

In 1995, he played in Broadway Bound at Lonny Chapman's Lonny Chapman Group Repertory Theatre in Los Angeles.

Lysenko acted in the films Mafia!, The Last Will, Interceptors, and The Stray. In 2000, under his own Bliss Productions, he wrote, produced and directed a feature-length film, Between Christmas & New Year's; the script improvised, and the film shot on 16mm film over 7 days for less than $5,000.

Lysenko is currently in pre-production on his fourth independent feature film.

== Personal life ==
Lysenko is the only son of Leonid Lysenko, an American Korean War veteran, and E. Contreras Lysenko of New Mexico. He is married to Sophie Moine Lysenko, a graduate of UCLA.

In 1999, he opened his own Bliss Art House Café on N. Vine Street, Hollywood. The venue attracted writers, artists, singers, poets and comedians, and was used for daily Alcoholics Anonymous meetings.

In 2009, he ran for the U.S. House of Representatives in California's 32nd district. He came 10th out of 12 candidates, with 247 votes (0.5% share).

Lysenko graduated in Business Management from San Jose State University and studied in a one-year master's degree program in Conflict Resolution at Antioch University College.

== Film credits ==
- 2010: A Moral Man... Amongst Paradoxical Leaders (drama short) – Role: Voice (Bliss Productions).
- 2009: Life Is Like a Short Train Ride (video short) – Role: Spirit (Bliss Productions).
- 2009: Trasharella – Role: Hilgard Osenfuer (Rena Riffel Films, Torture Chamber Studio, Trashterpiece Horror Theater).
- 2008: The Other Side of the Coin (animation short) – Role: Guard (voice).
- 2007: Starting from Scratch – Role: Mitch (Bliss Productions).
- 2004: La dentista (short) – Role: La Dentista (Duct Taped King Productions).
- 2003: Dark Waters (video) – Role: Captain Yarborough.
- 2003: Shark Zone (video) – Role: Jordan (Martien Holdings A.V.V., Nu Image Films).
- 2003: Chooch – Role: Billy Del Nino (Bacchus Films, Fruitbasket Films).
- 2002: Unstable Minds – Role: Billy (B and O Films, Seven Light Films).
- 2001: The Last Will – Role: Sal (Global Film, Hrvatska Radiotelevizija (HRT).
- 2000: The Stray – Role: Gil Draper (PM Entertainment Group).
- 1999: Alien Interceptors – Role: Rosario (Unified Film Organization (UFO), Interceptors Productions Inc).
- 1998: Jane Austen's Mafia! – Role: Ruffo (Tapestry Films, Touchstone Pictures).
- 1998: No Rest for the Wicked – Role: Father William (Skyline Productions Inc).
- 1998: Vermin – Role: Duke (Arroz Con Pollo Productions, Igneous Films).
- 1996: South Bureau Homicide (short) – Role: Brad Colby (Noche Entertainment).
- 1994: Love Affair – Role: Russian Sailor (Mulholland Productions).
- 1989: Danger Zone II: Reaper's Revenge – Role: Airport Cop.
