= Monterey Park, California =

City in California, United States

- City
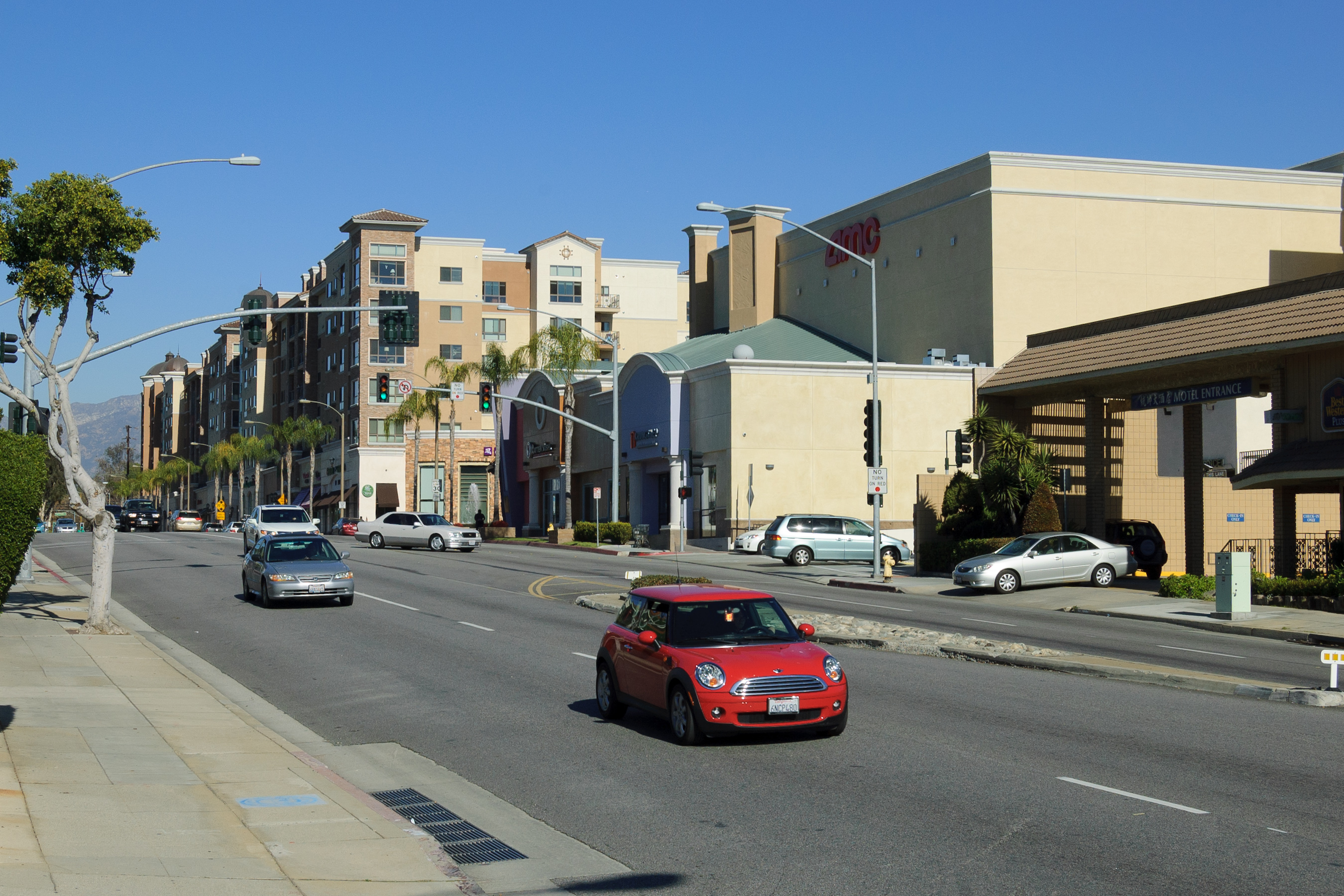
- A busy section of Atlantic Boulevard

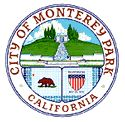
- Seal
- Motto(s): Pride in the Past, Faith in the Future
- Interactive map of Monterey Park, California
- Location in the United States Monterey Park (California) Monterey Park (the United States)
- Coordinates: 34°2′57″N 118°8′8″W
- Country: United States
- State: California
- County: Los Angeles
- Incorporated: May 29, 1916

Government
  - Type: Council-Manager
  - Mayor: Elizabeth Yang
  - Mayor Pro Tem: Henry Lo
  - City council: Vinh T. Ngo; Jose Sanchez; Thomas Wong
  - City Manager: Inez Alvarez (Interim)
  - Assistant City Manager: Diana Garcia (Interim)

Area
  - Total: 7.73 sq mi (20.03 km^{2})
  - Land: 7.67 sq mi (19.87 km^{2})
  - Water: 0.062 sq mi (0.16 km^{2}) 0.77%
- Elevation: 384 ft (117 m)

Population (2020)
  - Total: 61,096
  - Estimate (2024): 57,996
  - Density: 7,963/sq mi (3,074.7/km^{2})
- Time zone: UTC-8 (Pacific Time Zone)
  - Summer (DST): UTC-7 (PDT)
- ZIP codes: 91754, 91755, 91756
- Area code: 323, 626
- FIPS code: 06-48914
- GNIS feature IDs: 1652753, 2411146
- Website: www.montereypark.ca.gov

Monterey Park is a city in the western San Gabriel Valley region of Los Angeles County, California, United States, approximately seven miles (11 km) east of the Downtown Los Angeles civic center. It is bordered by Alhambra, East Los Angeles, Montebello and Rosemead. The city's motto is "Pride in the past, Faith in the future."

Monterey Park is part of a cluster of cities (Alhambra, Arcadia, Temple City, Rosemead, San Marino, and San Gabriel in the west San Gabriel Valley) with a growing Asian American population. According to the 2020 Census, the city had a total population of 61,096. Monterey Park has consistently ranked as one of the country's best places to live due to its schools, growing economy, and central location.

== History ==
=== Early history ===
For at least seven thousand years the land was populated by the Tongva (Gabrielino) Native Americans. The Tongva lived in dome like structures with thatched exteriors, with an open smoke hole for ventilation and light at the top. Both sexes wore long hair styles and tattooed their bodies. During warm weather the men wore few clothes, and the women wore minimal skirts made of animal hides. During the cold weather they would wear animal skin capes and occasionally wore sandals made from hide or yucca fiber. With the arrival of the Spaniards, Old World diseases killed off many of the Tongva, and by 1870 very few Native-Americans had survived. In the early 19th century the area was part of the Mission San Gabriel Arcángel mission system and later the Rancho San Antonio.

=== 1860s–1960s ===
Following the Civil War, an Italian, Alessandro Repetto, purchased 5,000 acres (20 km^{2}) of the rancho and built his ranch house on the hill overlooking his land, about a half-mile north of where Garfield Avenue crosses the Pomona Freeway, not far from where the Edison substation is now located on Garfield Avenue. In 1886, a northwestern portion of the rancho was bought by Isaias Wolf Hellman, a Bavarian-born banker and philanthropist who is the namesake of Hellman Avenue, a street that partly forms the northern boundary of Monterey Park.

It was at this time, Richard Garvey, a mail rider for the U.S. Army whose route took him through Monterey Pass, a trail that is now Garvey Avenue, settled down in the King's Hills. Garvey began developing the land by bringing in spring water from near the Hondo River and by constructing a 54-foot-high (16 m) dam to form Garvey Lake located where Garvey Ranch Park is now. To pay for his development and past debts, Garvey began selling portions of his property. In 1906, the first subdivision in the area, Ramona Acres (named after the developer's daughter, who would also later inspire the title of the novel Ramona), was developed north of Garvey and east of Garfield Avenues.

In 1916, the new residents of the area initiated action to become a city when the cities of Pasadena, South Pasadena, and Alhambra proposed to put a large sewage treatment facility in the area. The community voted itself into cityhood on May 29, 1916, by a vote of 455 to 33. The city's new board of directors immediately outlawed sewage plants within city boundaries and named the new city Monterey Park. The name was taken from an old government map showing the oak-covered hills of the area as Monterey Hills. In 1920, a large area on the south edge of the city broke away and the separate city of Montebello was established.

By 1920, the white and Spanish-surname settlers were joined by Asian residents who began farming potatoes and flowers and developing nurseries in the Monterey Highlands area. They improved the Monterey Pass Trail with a road to aid in shipping their produce to Los Angeles. The nameless pass, which had been used as a location for western movies, was called Coyote Pass by Pioneer Masami Abe.

In 1926, near the corner of Atlantic Boulevard and Garvey Avenue, Laura Scudder invented the first sealed bag of potato chips. In an effort to maintain quality and freshness, Laura's team would iron sheets of wax paper together to form a bag. They would fill these bags with potato chips; iron the top closed, and then deliver them to various retailers.

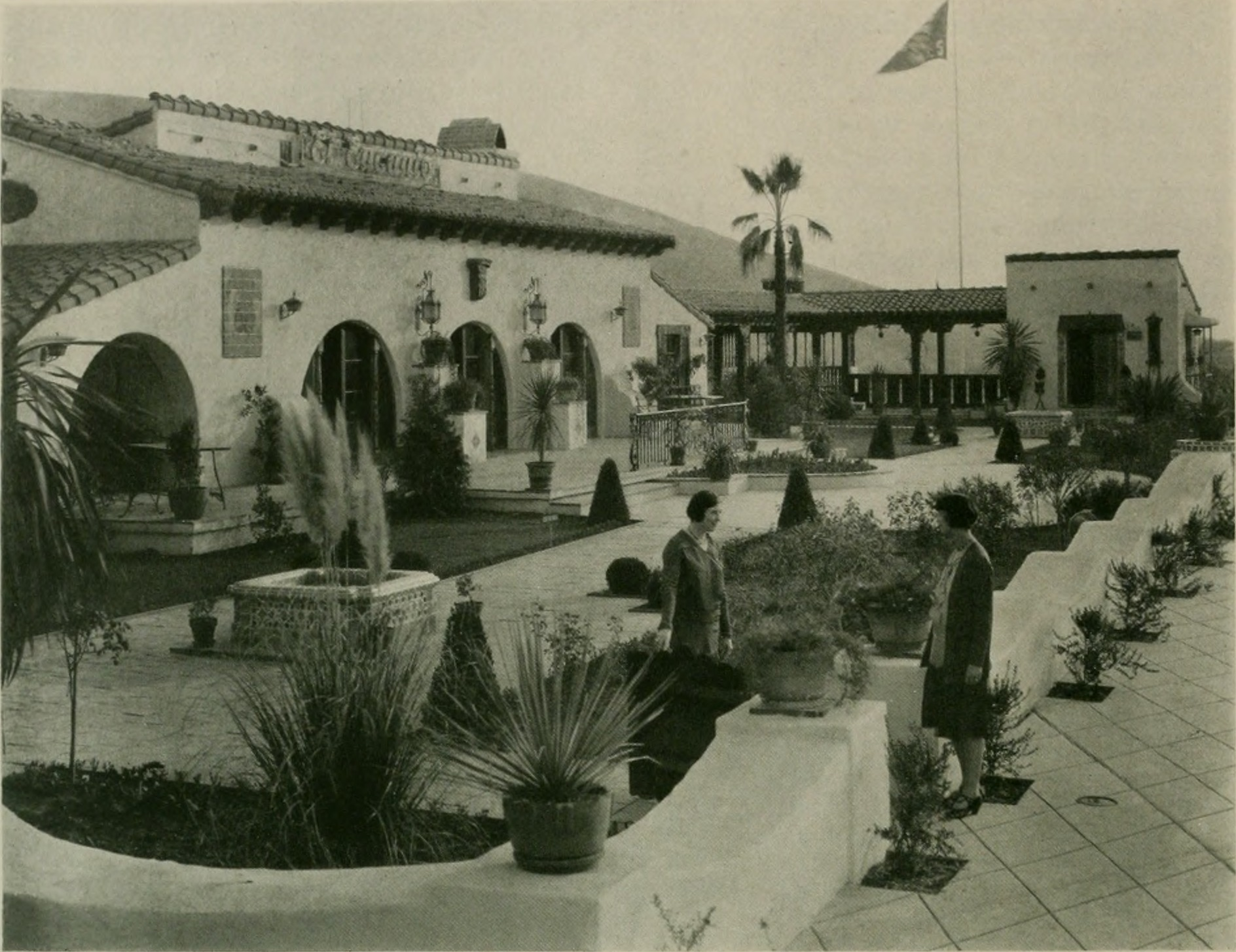
Jardin del Encanto, the administration building of Midwick View Estates, 1930

Real estate became a thriving industry during the late 1920s with investors attracted to the many subdivisions under development and increasing commercial opportunities. The Midwick View Estates by Peter N. Snyder, a proposed garden community that was designed to rival Bel Air and Beverly Hills. Known as the "Father of the East Side", Mr. Snyder was a key player in the vast undertaking in the 1920s of developing the East Side as part of the industrial base of Los Angeles. His efforts to build Atlantic Boulevard, his work with the East Side organization to bring industry to the East Side, and his residential and commercial development projects along Atlantic Boulevard (Gardens Square, Golden Gate Square, and the Midwick View Estates) were a major influence to the surrounding communities. The focal point of the Midwick View Estates was "Jardin del Encanto", otherwise known as "El Encanto," a Spanish style building that was to serve as the administration building and community center for Midwick View Estates. The development also included an observation terrace above Jardin del Encanto and the fountain with cascading water going down the hillside in stepped pools to De La Fuente. Now known as Heritage Falls Park or "the Cascades." The Great Depression brought an abrupt end to the real estate boom, as well as the Midwick proposal. From the late 1920s, the city had little development for nearly two decades.

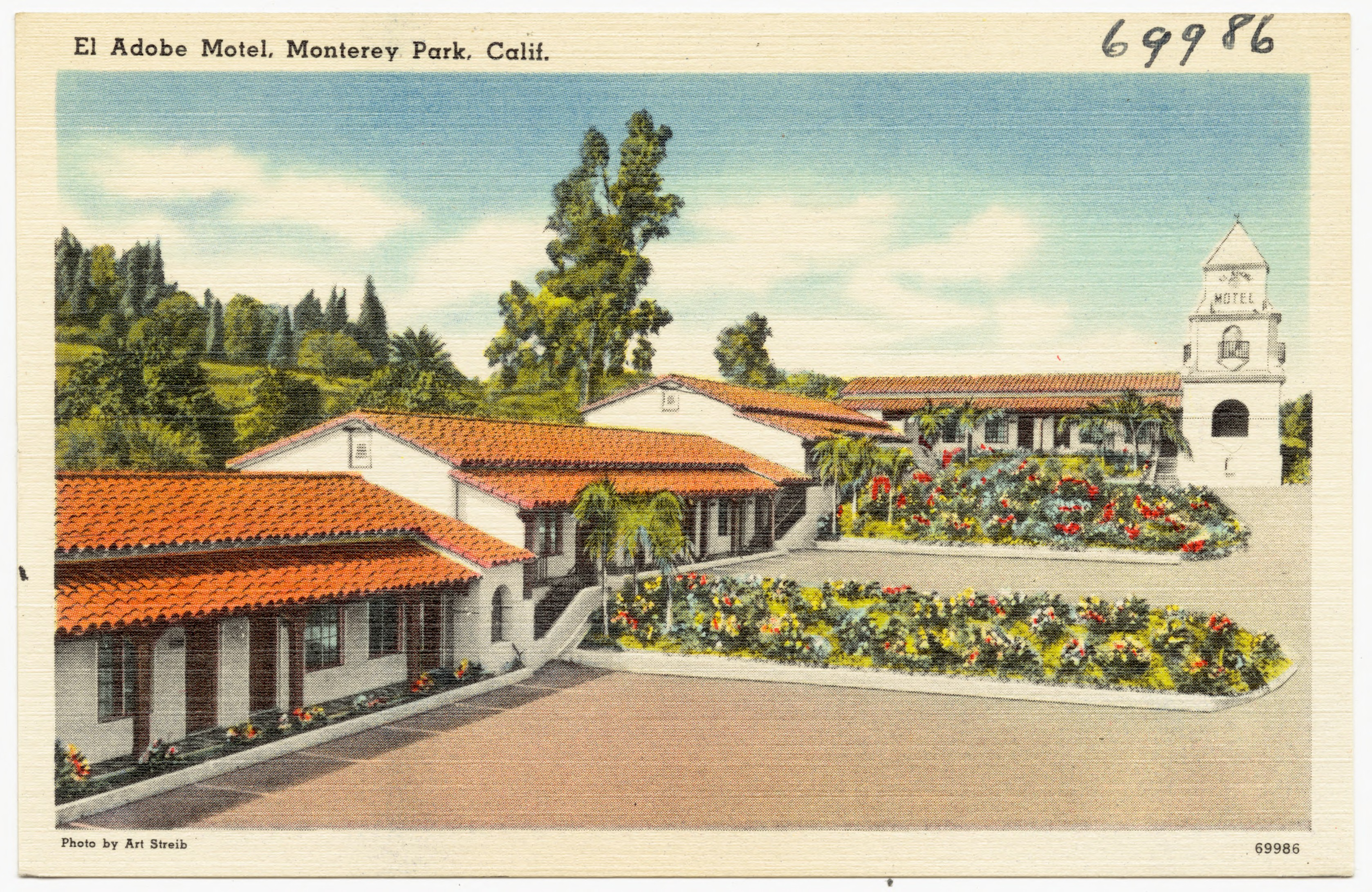
El Adobe Motel, Monterey Park, c. 1930-1945

The end of World War II resulted in a revived growth trend with explosive population gains during the late 1940s and 1950s. Until this time, the population was concentrated in the northern and southern portions of the city, with the Garvey and Monterey Hills forming a natural barrier. With the renewed growth, many new subdivisions were developed, utilizing even the previously undeveloped central area to allow for maximum growth potential. A series of annexations of surrounding land also occurred. Many veterans settled in Monterey Park and continued through the 1950s. Around this time, Japanese Americans from the West Side, Chinese Americans from Chinatown, and Latinos from East Los Angeles also began settling in the area and largely assimilated into the small-town suburban culture.

=== 1970s–1990s ===
Beginning in the 1970s, middle-class ethnic Asian Americans and Asian immigrants began settling in the west San Gabriel Valley, primarily to Monterey Park. The City Council of Monterey Park subsequently tried and failed to pass English-only ordinances. In 1985 the Council approved drafting of a proposal that would require all businesses in Monterey Park to display English language identification on business signs.

In the 1980s, Monterey Park was referred to as "Little Taipei" or "The Chinese Beverly Hills." Frederic Hsieh, a local realtor who bought land in Monterey Park and sold it to newly arrived immigrants, is credited with engendering Monterey Park's Chinese American community. Many businesses from the Chinatown in downtown LA began to open up stores in Monterey Park. In the 1970s and 1980s, many affluent waisheng ren Taiwanese immigrants moved abroad from Taiwan and began settling into Monterey Park. Mandarin Chinese became the most widely spoken language in many Chinese businesses of the city during that time, displacing Cantonese that had been common previously. Cantonese has dominated the Chinatowns of North America for decades, but Mandarin is the most common language of Chinese immigrants in the past few decades. In 1983, Lily Lee Chen became the first Chinese American woman to be elected mayor of a U.S. city. By the late 1980s, immigrants from mainland China and Vietnam began moving into Monterey Park. By the 1990 census, Monterey Park became the first city with an Asian descent majority population in the continental United States. Timothy P. Fong, a professor and director of Asian American studies at California State University, Sacramento, describes Monterey Park as the "First Suburban Chinatown."

In the 1980s, the second generation Chinese Americans generally moved out of the old Chinatown and into the San Gabriel Valley suburbs, joining the new immigrants from Taiwan and mainland China. From that time, with a combined influx of Vietnamese, Taiwanese and Hong Kong immigrant students at the time, Mark Keppel High School, constructed during the New Deal era and located in Alhambra, but also serving most of Monterey Park and portions of Rosemead, felt the impact of this new immigration as the student population increased dramatically, leading to overcrowding. Today, many students are second or third-generation Asian Americans.

In 1988, the City of Monterey Park passed an ordinance declaring a moratorium on new building, in an attempt to regulate the rapid growth the city experienced as a result of the influx of Asian immigrants. This moratorium was challenged and defeated in 1989. This controversial move caused many Asian residents and businesses to shift focus, establishing themselves in the neighboring city of Alhambra. When the potential loss of business revenue was recognized, "Monterey Park went through a lot of upheaval that a lot of people regret," and relocation back to Monterey Park was highly encouraged in the Asian American community.

Since the early 1990s, Taiwanese people are no longer the majority in the city. The construction boom of shopping centers had declined, but plans for redevelopment sought to change that. High property values and overcrowding in Monterey Park have contributed to a secondary migration away from Monterey Park.

=== 2000s–present ===
Redevelopment produced several projects included the massive Atlantic Times Square development that opened in 2010 with ground-floor shops and restaurants. The Atlantic Times Square, which has 215,000 square feet (20,000 m^{2}), is anchored by a multi-plex theater and a fitness center, in addition to eating establishments and other stores. The development includes 210 condos on the third through sixth floors.

Monterey Park Village is a 40,000 sq. ft. shopping center on South Atlantic Boulevard commercial corridor. The CVS Center on South Garfield Avenue is a redevelopment of infill site into a 17,000 square feet (1,600 m^{2}) neighborhood convenience center. Anchor tenant CVS Pharmacy brings a full-service drug store back to the downtown project, and the center includes a Subway sandwich shop. The 507,000-square-foot (47,100 m^{2}) Monterey Park Marketplace is the largest shopping center in the city. Located along the Pomona (60) Freeway west of Paramount Boulevard, this center is a 45-acre regional shopping center for the San Gabriel Valley.

In 2017, Monterey Park was recognized as "America's Best Places to Live 2017" ranked at #3 by Money magazine and three local news TV stations. It also ranked at #2 in Money Magazine's "The 10 Best Places in America to Raise a Family".

On January 21, 2023, a mass shooting occurred at a dance studio in the city, after a Chinese New Year celebration where twenty people were shot, killing eleven of them, and injuring nine others. The gunman, identified as 72-year-old Huu Can Tran, fled and was found dead from a self-inflicted gunshot wound in Torrance the next day.

In April 2026, Monterey Park became the first city in California to ban data centers within its limits.

== Geography ==
According to the United States Census Bureau, the city has a total area of 7.7 square miles (20.0 km^{2}), of which 7.7 square miles (19.9 km^{2}) is land, and 0.062 square miles (0.16 km^{2}) (0.77%) is water.

The city boundaries include unincorporated East Los Angeles to the west and southwest, Alhambra to the north, Rosemead to the northeast, Montebello to the south, and unincorporated South San Gabriel to the southeast.

== Demographics ==
Historical population
| Census | Pop. | Note | %± |
|---|---|---|---|
| 1920 | 4,108 | | — |
| 1930 | 6,406 | | 55.9% |
| 1940 | 8,531 | | 33.2% |
| 1950 | 20,395 | | 139.1% |
| 1960 | 37,821 | | 85.4% |
| 1970 | 49,166 | | 30.0% |
| 1980 | 54,338 | | 10.5% |
| 1990 | 60,738 | | 11.8% |
| 2000 | 60,051 | | −1.1% |
| 2010 | 60,269 | | 0.4% |
| 2020 | 61,096 | | 1.4% |
| 2024 (est.) | 57,996 | ▼ | −5.1% |
U.S. Decennial Census; 1860–1870 1880-1890; 1900 1910 1920; 1930 1940 1950; 1960 1970 1980; 1990 2000 2010; 2020

Monterey Park first appeared as a city in the 1920 U.S. census.

=== Racial and ethnic composition ===
Monterey Park city, California – Racial and ethnic composition Note: the US Census treats Hispanic/Latino as an ethnic category. This table excludes Latinos from the racial categories and assigns them to a separate category. Hispanics/Latinos may be of any race.
| Race / Ethnicity (NH = Non-Hispanic) | Pop 1980 | Pop 1990 | Pop 2000 | Pop 2010 | Pop 2020 | % 1980 | % 1990 | % 2000 | % 2010 | % 2020 |
|---|---|---|---|---|---|---|---|---|---|---|
| White alone (NH) | 13,866 | 7,129 | 4,362 | 2,998 | 2,384 | 25.52% | 11.74% | 7.26% | 4.97% | 3.90% |
| Black or African American alone (NH) | 635 | 330 | 182 | 194 | 358 | 1.17% | 0.54% | 0.30% | 0.32% | 0.59% |
| Native American or Alaska Native alone (NH) | 90 | 104 | 98 | 51 | 64 | 0.17% | 0.17% | 0.16% | 0.08% | 0.10% |
| Asian alone (NH) | 18,608 | 34,022 | 36,912 | 39,974 | 40,353 | 34.24% | 56.01% | 61.47% | 66.33% | 66.05% |
| Native Hawaiian or Pacific Islander alone (NH) | 18,608 | 34,022 | 24 | 19 | 45 | 34.24% | 56.01% | 0.04% | 0.03% | 0.07% |
| Other race alone (NH) | 170 | 122 | 61 | 51 | 174 | 0.31% | 0.20% | 0.10% | 0.08% | 0.28% |
| Mixed race or Multiracial (NH) | x | x | 1,053 | 764 | 950 | x | x | 1.75% | 1.27% | 1.55% |
| Hispanic or Latino (any race) | 20,969 | 19,031 | 17,359 | 16,218 | 16,768 | 38.59% | 31.33% | 28.91% | 26.91% | 27.45% |
| Total | 54,338 | 60,738 | 60,051 | 60,269 | 61,096 | 100.00% | 100.00% | 100.00% | 100.00% | 100.00% |

=== 2020 census ===
As of the 2020 census, Monterey Park had a population of 61,096. The population density was 7,963.5 inhabitants per square mile (3,074.7/km^{2}). For every 100 females, there were 92.3 males, and for every 100 females age 18 and over, there were 89.5 males age 18 and over.

The age distribution was 17.1% under the age of 18, 7.9% aged 18 to 24, 26.2% aged 25 to 44, 27.5% aged 45 to 64, and 21.3% who were 65 years of age or older. The median age was 44.0 years.

The census reported that 99.6% of the population lived in households, 0.1% lived in non-institutionalized group quarters, and 0.3% were institutionalized. 100.0% of residents lived in urban areas, while 0.0% lived in rural areas.

There were 20,652 households, of which 30.5% had children under the age of 18 living in them. Of all households, 48.5% were married-couple households, 4.8% were cohabiting couple households, 17.8% were households with a male householder and no spouse or partner present, and 29.0% were households with a female householder and no spouse or partner present. About 18.8% of households were one person, and 10.5% had someone living alone who was 65 years of age or older. The average household size was 2.95, and there were 15,447 families (74.8% of all households).

There were 21,549 housing units at an average density of 2,808.8 units per square mile (1,084.5 units/km^{2}), of which 20,652 (95.8%) were occupied. Of occupied units, 51.9% were owner-occupied and 48.1% were occupied by renters. The homeowner vacancy rate was 0.5%, and the rental vacancy rate was 3.2%.

=== 2023 ACS 5-year estimates ===
In 2023, the US Census Bureau estimated that the median household income was $77,605, and the per capita income was $37,702. About 10.7% of families and 13.2% of the population were below the poverty line.

=== 2010 census ===
The 2010 United States census reported that Monterey Park had a population of 60,269. The population density was 7,793.7 inhabitants per square mile (3,009.2/km^{2}). The racial makeup of Monterey Park was 40,301 (66.9%) Asian (47.7% Chinese, 5.8% Japanese, 4.4% Vietnamese, 1.9% Filipino, 1.3% Korean, 0.9% Thai, 0.8% Cambodian, 0.4% Burmese, 0.4% Indonesian, 0.3% Indian), 28 (0.05%) Pacific Islander, 11,680 (19.4%) White (5.0% Non-Hispanic White), 252 (0.4%) African American, 242 (0.4%) Native American, 6,022 (10.0%) from other races, and 1,744 (2.9%) from two or more races. Hispanic or Latino of any race were 16,218 persons (26.9%).

The Census reported that 60,039 people (99.6% of the population) lived in households, 41 (0.1%) lived in non-institutionalized group quarters, and 189 (0.3%) were institutionalized.

There were 19,963 households, out of which 6,315 (31.6%) had children under the age of 18 living in them, 10,538 (52.8%) were opposite-sex married couples living together, 3,243 (16.2%) had a female householder with no husband present, 1,460 (7.3%) had a male householder with no wife present. There were 651 (3.3%) unmarried opposite-sex partnerships, and 85 (0.4%) same-sex married couples or partnerships. 3,641 households (18.2%) were made up of individuals, and 2,025 (10.1%) had someone living alone who was 65 years of age or older. The average household size was 3.01. There were 15,241 families (76.3% of all households); the average family size was 3.37.

The population was spread out, with 10,932 people (18.1%) under the age of 18, 5,180 people (8.6%) aged 18 to 24, 15,597 people (25.9%) aged 25 to 44, 16,904 people (28.0%) aged 45 to 64, and 11,656 people (19.3%) who were 65 years of age or older. The median age was 43.1 years. For every 100 females, there were 92.2 males. For every 100 females age 18 and over, there were 89.4 males.

There were 20,850 housing units at an average density of 2,696.2 units per square mile (1,041.0 units/km^{2}), of which 11,058 (55.4%) were owner-occupied, and 8,905 (44.6%) were occupied by renters. The homeowner vacancy rate was 0.5%; the rental vacancy rate was 4.1%. 33,073 people (54.9% of the population) lived in owner-occupied housing units and 26,966 people (44.7%) lived in rental housing units.

According to the 2010 United States census, Monterey Park had a median household income of $56,014, with 15.2% of the population living below the federal poverty line.

=== Ethnic groups ===
According to the 2009 American Community Survey, Monterey Park is 43.7% Chinese American, and is the city in the United States with the largest concentration of people of Chinese descent. The Chinese American population in Monterey Park and San Gabriel Valley is relatively diverse in socio-economics and region of origin. The city has attracted immigrants from Taiwan, as well as mainland Chinese and the overseas Chinese from Southeast Asia. There are also significant Japanese, Vietnamese and Filipino communities living within Monterey Park.

While the multi-generational American-born Latino population was generally declining in Monterey Park, there has been a small new influx of Mexican immigrants (about one percent increase in the population).

== Economy ==
Downtown Monterey Park, California

The Chinese-dominated business district, near the intersection of Garfield Avenue and Garvey Avenue, is called "Downtown Monterey Park." In the mid-1980s, Lincoln Plaza Hotel was built to predominantly service tourists from Taiwan and Hong Kong. Monterey Park has many choices of Hong Kong fusion cafes, there are several Cantonese seafood restaurants, as well as restaurants offering mainland Chinese fare. A variety of cuisine can be found throughout the city.

=== Top employers ===
According to the city's 2025 Annual Comprehensive Financial Report, the top employers in the city are:

| # | Employer | # of Employees |
|---|---|---|
| 1 | Garfield Medical Center | 819 |
| 2 | Southern California Gas Company | 765 |
| 3 | Costco | 449 |
| 4 | Monterey Park Hospital | 368 |
| 5 | Network Medical Management Inc. | 325 |
| 6 | Home Depot | 225 |
| 7 | Ralphs Grocery Co. | 161 |
| 8 | Behavior Respite in Action Inc. | 149 |
| 9 | RemitCo LLC | 142 |
| 10 | Monterey Park Convalescent Hospital Inc. | 132 |

== Arts and culture ==
Monterey Park is home to the Garvey Ranch Observatory, located in Garvey Ranch Park, which is operated by the Los Angeles Astronomical Society (LAAS). It adjoins a historical museum, a classroom, and a workshop. The observatory houses an 8-inch (200 mm) refractor, a telescope making workshop, and a library containing over 1000 books. The grounds are open to the public for free astronomical observation on Wednesday evenings from 7:30PM – 10:00PM, hosted by LAAS members.

Built in 1929, Jardin El Encanto, otherwise known as "El Encanto," is a Spanish-style building located at 700 El Mercado. The building, originally the sales office for Midwick Estates, was once a USO center and speakeasy.

== Government ==
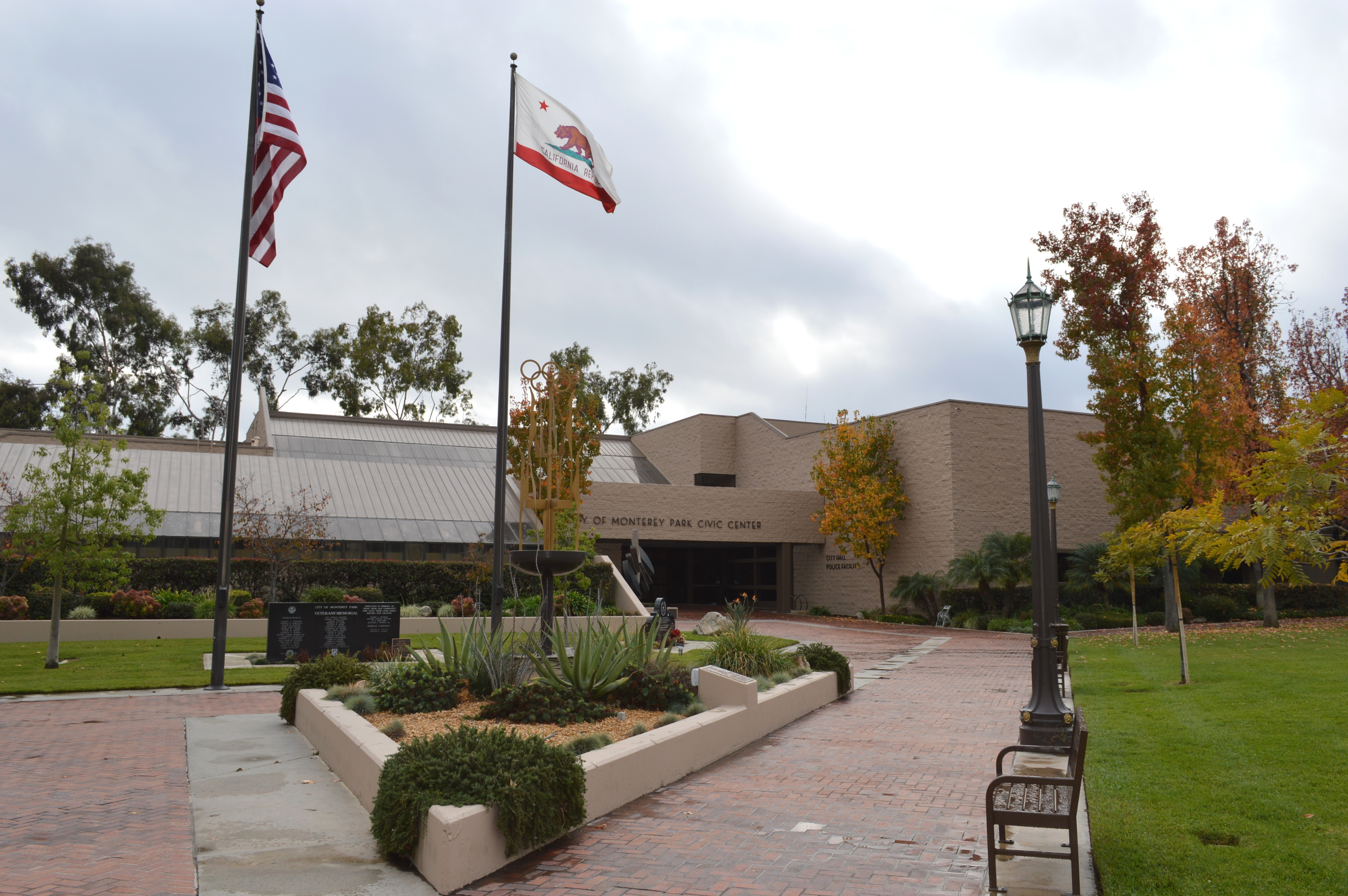
The Monterey Park Civic Center

=== Local government ===
The city of Monterey Park has its own police and fire departments serving the city.

Monterey Park City Municipal Elections were held every two years in odd numbered years, on the first Tuesday in March until the 2017 election. Effective with the 2020 California Primary election, City Council elections will be held on even-numbered years on a Tuesday after the first Monday in March. Five Council Members serve four year terms with overlapping terms in bi-annual elections: the three seats elected in one election and two seats in the next election, at which time the City Clerk and City Treasurer are also elected.

The current elected officials are:

- Elizabeth Yang, Mayor
- Henry Lo, Mayor Pro Tem
- Jose Sanchez, Council Member
- Thomas Wong, Council Member
- Vinh T. Ngo, Council Member
- Maychelle Yee, City Clerk
- Amy Lee, City Treasurer

=== List of mayors ===
This is a list of Monterey Park mayors by year.

Centennial Monument in front of City Hall lists all Mayors from 1916 - 2016

- 1937 F.C. Owen
- 1938 I.J. Williams
- 1940 James T. Bradshaw
- 1954-1955 Philip E. Marria
- 1956-1959 1961-1962 Rod Irvine
- 1956-1958 George Brown Jr.
- October 1957 Leila Donegan - First woman mayor.
- 1960 Gordon B. Severance
- 1960-1961 Leila Donegan - First woman mayor.
- 1974-1975 Matthew G. Martinez
- 1977-1978 George Ige
- 1978-1979 G. Monty Manibog
- 1980 Matthew G. Martinez
- April 1982 - February 1983 G. Monty Manibog
- November 1983 – 1984 Lily Lee Chen - First female Chinese-American mayor in the United States.
- April 1986 - February 1987 G. Monty Manibog
- December 1987 – 1988 Christopher F. Houseman
- 1988-1989 Barry Hatch
- 1989 Judy Chu
- February 1991 Betty Couch
- September 1992 Fred Balderrama
- 1995 Rita Valenzuela
- 2000-2001 Frank Venti
- 2001 Francisco M. Alonso
- 2002 Fred Balderrama
- 2003-2004 Sharon Martinez
- August 2004-January 2005 Mike Eng
- 2005-2006 Frank Venti
- March 2006 Betty Tom Chu
- 2008-2009 Frank Venti
- February 2010 Anthony Wong
- June 2012 Mitchell Ing
- 2013 Anthony Wong
- January 2014 Anthony Wong
- 2014-2015 Hans Liang
- August 2015- May 2016 Peter Chan
- May 2016 - April 2017 Mitchell Ing
- April 2017 to December 2017 Teresa Real Sebastian
- December 2017-October 2018 Stephen Lam
- October 2018 Peter Chan.
- July 2019- Aug 2020 Hans Liang
- Aug 2020 - Dec 2020 Peter Chan
- Dec 2020 - Dec 2021 Yvonne Yiu
- Dec 2021 - Jan 2023 Henry Lo

=== County representation ===
In the Los Angeles County Board of Supervisors, Monterey Park is in the First District, represented by Hilda Solis.

The Los Angeles County Sheriff's Department had its central headquarters in Monterey Park. The Edmund D. Edelman Children's Court, Sybil Brand Institute, Central Juvenile District, (Dependency) is located in Monterey Park. The Los Angeles County Department of Health Services operates the Monrovia Health Center in Monrovia, serving Monterey Park.

=== State and federal representation ===
In the state legislature, Monterey Park is located in the 25th senatorial district, represented by Democrat Sasha Renée Pérez, and in the 49th Assembly district, represented by Democrat Mike Fong.

In the United States House of Representatives, Monterey Park is in California's 28th congressional district, represented by Democrat Judy Chu. Chu previously served as mayor and city council member of Monterey Park.

== Politics ==
United States presidential election results for Monterey Park, California
| Year | Republican | | Democratic | | Third party(ies) | |
| Year | No. | % | No. | % | No. | % |
|---|---|---|---|---|---|---|
| 2000 | 3,665 | 30.34% | 8,025 | 66.43% | 391 | 3.24% |
| 2004 | 7,012 | 36.01% | 12,249 | 62.91% | 211 | 1.08% |
| 2008 | 6,130 | 33.54% | 11,782 | 64.46% | 366 | 2.00% |
| 2012 | 4,664 | 28.24% | 11,521 | 69.76% | 330 | 2.00% |
| 2016 | 4,251 | 24.79% | 12,051 | 70.28% | 845 | 4.93% |
| 2020 | 7,027 | 30.27% | 15,808 | 68.09% | 380 | 1.64% |
| 2024 | 7,114 | 36.09% | 11,905 | 60.39% | 694 | 3.52% |

== Education ==
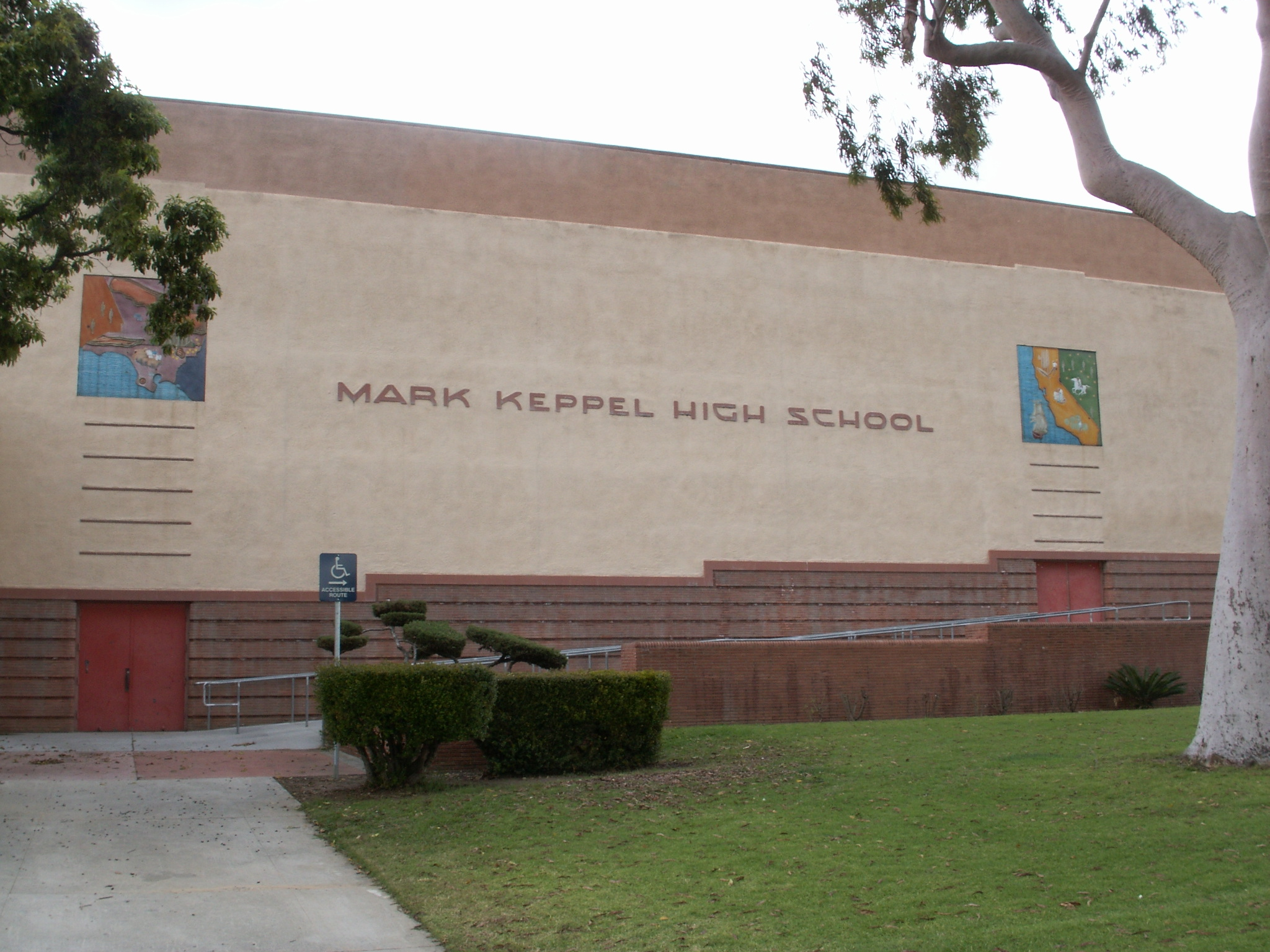
Mark Keppel High School

=== Colleges and universities ===
East Los Angeles College is located in Monterey Park in an area that was once part of East Los Angeles. California State University, Los Angeles is located just outside the northwestern corner of the city.

=== Primary and secondary schools ===
Alhambra Unified School District, Garvey School District, Los Angeles Unified School District, and Montebello Unified School District serve different areas of Monterey Park.

==== Public schools ====
===== Alhambra Unified School District =====
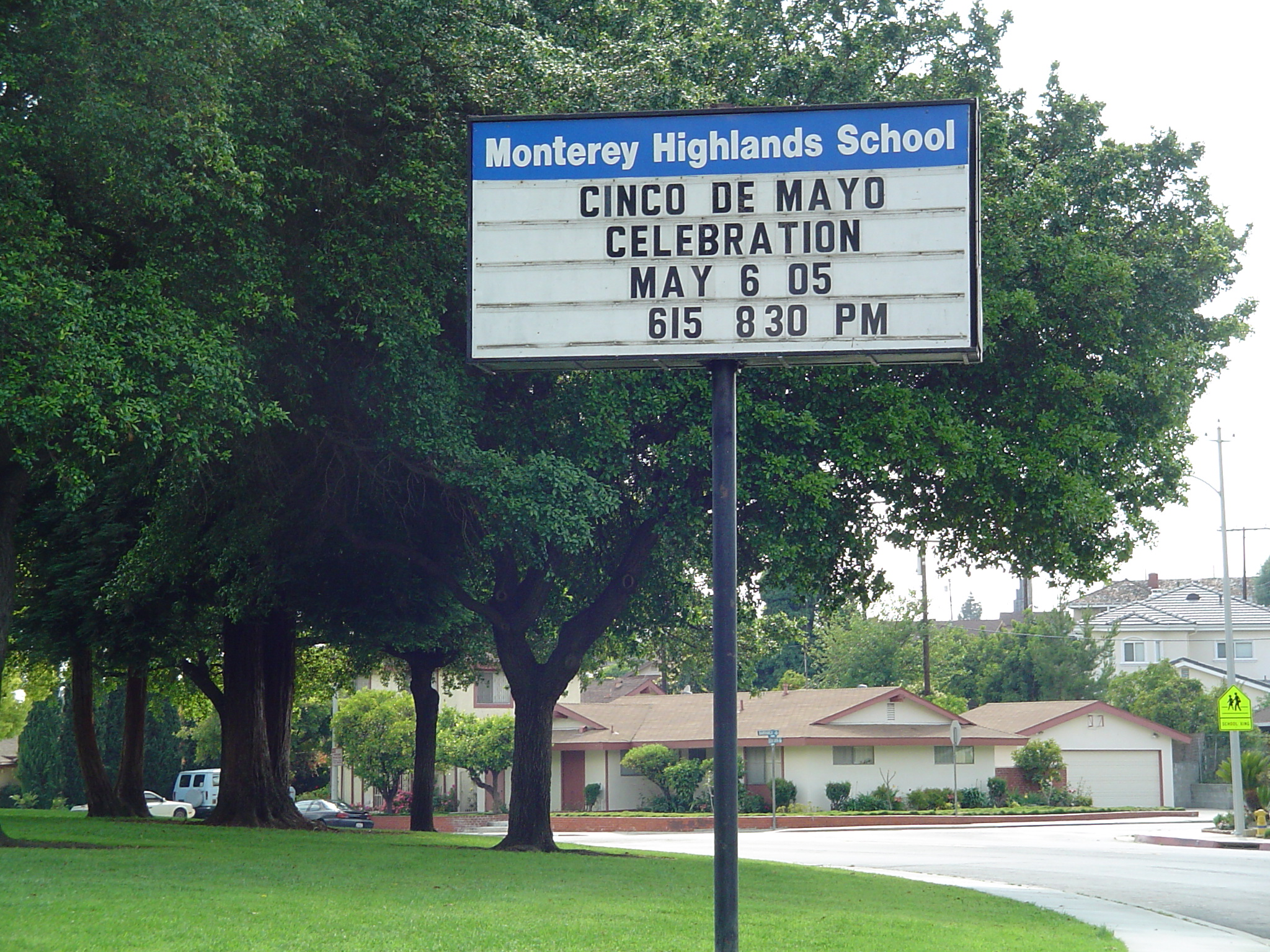
Monterey Highlands School

K-8 schools serving AUSD in Monterey Park include:

- Brightwood School
- Monterey Highlands School
- Repetto School
- Ynez School

Mark Keppel High School serves graduates from AUSD and Garvey School District.

===== Garvey School District =====
Two elementary schools, Hillcrest and Monterey Vista (both in Monterey Park), serve this part of the city. Monterey Vista is a Blue Ribbon School.

Richard Garvey Intermediate School (Rosemead) also serves this portion.

===== Los Angeles Unified School District =====
Robert Hill Lane Elementary School (Monterey Park), Griffith Middle School (Unincorporated Los Angeles County), and Garfield High School (Unincorporated Los Angeles County) serve the LAUSD part of the city.

===== Montebello Unified School District =====
Bella Vista Elementary School, Monterey Park; Macy Intermediate School, Monterey Park, and Schurr High School, Montebello, serve the MUSD portion.

==== Private schools ====
Saint Stephen Martyr School: opened in 1926 to provide the families of Monterey Park with an opportunity for their children to receive a Catholic School education. K–Grade 8 The school closed in 2023.

Meher Montessori School: preschool, lower and upper elementary classes

St Thomas Aquinas School: A Catholic parish school, serving economically and ethnically diverse students in grades Kindergarten through eighth. Founded in 1963, the Church is in the center of the school both physically and spiritually. The school is accredited by the Western Association of Schools and Colleges and the Western Catholic Educational Association.

New Avenue School PreKindergarten—Kindergarten through 8th grade. New Avenue school was founded in 1961.

Alpha-Shen Preschool and Kindergarten

Esther's Nest Children's School Pre-Kindergarten—Kindergarten

Graceland Christian Day Care Center Pre-Kindergarten—Kindergarten

Monterey Park Christian School Pre-Kindergarten—Kindergarten

=== Public library ===
The Monterey Park Bruggemeyer Library serves Monterey Park.

== Transportation ==
Monterey Park is served by the Long Beach Freeway, (I-710), the San Bernardino Freeway (I-10), and the Pomona Freeway, SR 60.

Public transportation is provided by the city government, Spirit bus service and Metrolink feeder bus, the Montebello Bus Lines and the Los Angeles County Metropolitan Transportation Authority. Metro E Line light rail service stops at Atlantic station just south of the city limits. Metro J Line bus rapid transit stops at Cal State LA station, northwest of Monterey Park.

== Media ==
Monterey Park community news is covered by the city's official news publication, the Cascades Newspaper, as well as the San Gabriel Valley Tribune.

== Notable people ==
- Betty Tom Chu - former mayor of Monterey Park and first Chinese-American woman lawyer in Southern California.
- Judy Chu, former mayor of Monterey Park, Congresswoman from California's 27th district and former City Councilwoman
- Ernest "Red" Hallen, official photographer of the Panama Canal.
- Dan Haren, starting pitcher for the St. Louis Cardinals, Oakland Athletics, Arizona Diamondbacks, Los Angeles Dodgers and Miami Marlins
- William Hung, rejected American Idol contestant, current statistical analyst for the Los Angeles County Sheriff’s Department
- Vania King, 2010 Wimbledon and U.S. Open tennis doubles champion
- Saladin McCullough, NFL player
- Walter Sarnoi Oupathana, professional boxer
- Esther Salas, the first Hispanic woman to serve as a United States magistrate judge in the District of New Jersey, and the first Hispanic woman to be appointed a U.S. District Court judge in New Jersey.
- Roberta Shore, actress
- Enrique Torres, Mexican-American heavy weight professional wrestler and a major star of televised wrestling during the late 1940s and 1950s.
- Joyce Alene White Vance, U.S. Attorney and law professor
- Michael Woo, Los Angeles City Councilman (1985–1994) and Dean of the Cal Poly Pomona College of Environmental Design
- Wilbur Woo (1915–2012), businessman and leader in the Chinese-American community

== See also ==
- History of the Chinese Americans in Los Angeles
- Chinese enclaves in the San Gabriel Valley
