= Judy Chu =

American politician (born 1953)

- 趙美心
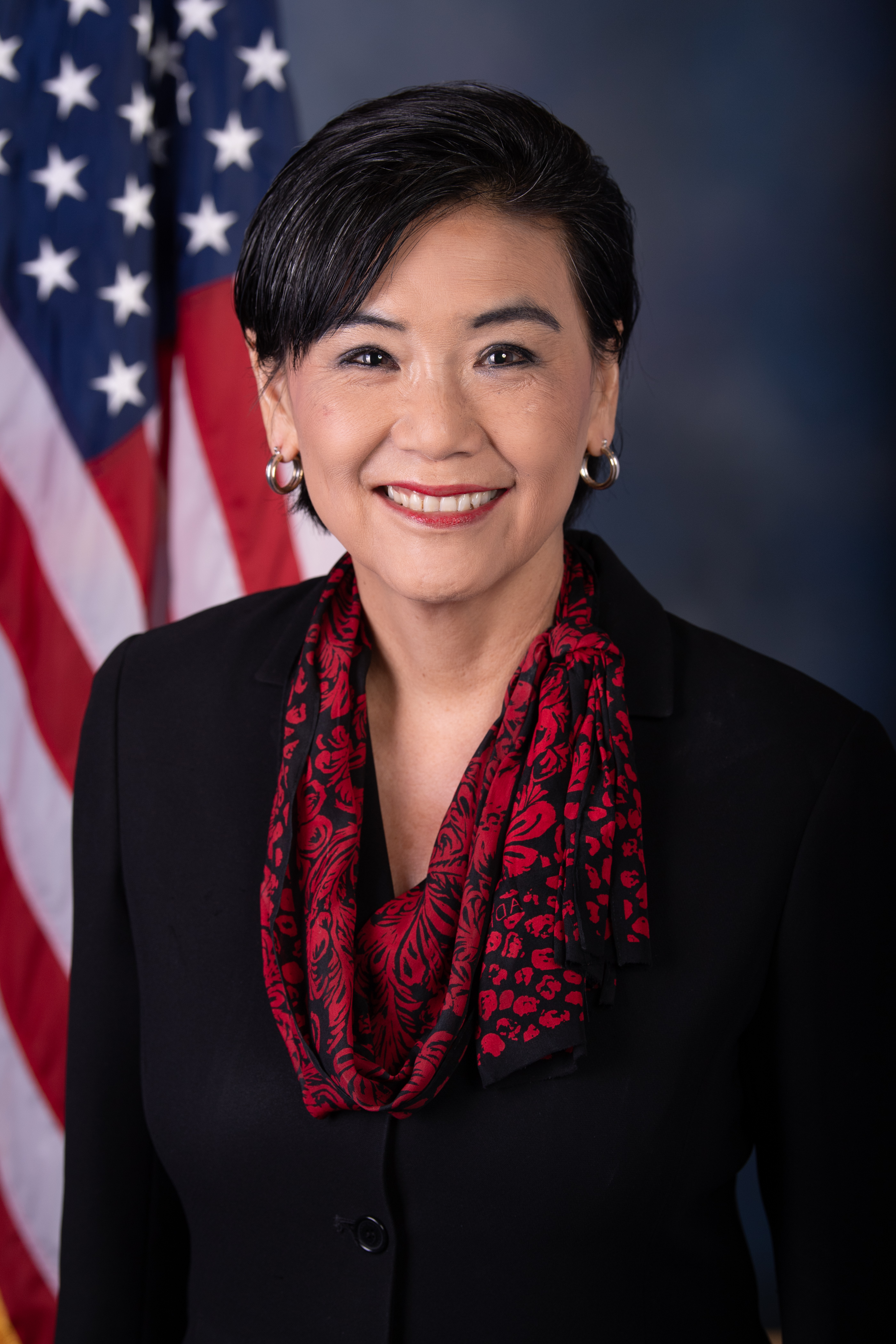
- Official portrait, 2019

Member of the U.S. House of Representatives from California
- Incumbent
- Assumed office July 16, 2009
- Preceded by: Hilda Solis
- Constituency: 32nd district (2009–2013); 27th district (2013–2023); 28th district (2023–present)

Member of the California State Board of Equalization from the 4th district
- In office January 3, 2007 – July 14, 2009
- Preceded by: John Chiang
- Succeeded by: Jerome Horton

Member of the California State Assembly from the 49th district
- In office May 21, 2001 – November 30, 2006
- Preceded by: Gloria Romero
- Succeeded by: Mike Eng

Personal details
- Born: Judy May Chu; July 7, 1953 (age 73) Los Angeles, California, U.S.
- Party: Democratic
- Spouse: Mike Eng (m. 1978)
- Education: University of California, Los Angeles (BA); Alliant International University (MA, PhD)
- Website: House website Campaign website

Chinese name
- Traditional Chinese: 趙美心
- Simplified Chinese: 赵美心
- Hanyu Pinyin: Zhào Měixīn
Transcriptions
Standard Mandarin
- Hanyu Pinyin: Zhào Měixīn
- Wade–Giles: Chao^{4} Mei^{3}-hsin^{1}
- IPA: [ʈʂâʊ mèɪɕín]
Yue: Cantonese
- Yale Romanization: Jiuh Méihsām
- Jyutping: Ziu6 Mei5 sam1
- Canton Romanization: Jiu6 Méi5 sem1
- Chu's voice Chu supporting the Respect for Marriage Act. Recorded December 8, 2022

Judy May Chu (born July 7, 1953) is an American politician and psychologist serving as the U.S. representative for California's 28th congressional district. A member of the Democratic Party, she has held a seat in Congress since 2009, representing California's 32nd congressional district until redistricting. Chu is the first Chinese American woman elected to Congress. She co-founded the University of California Chinese Alumni Association.

Chu was elected to the California Board of Equalization in 2007, representing the 4th district. She previously served on the Garvey Unified School District Board of Education, on the Monterey Park City Council (with three terms as mayor) and in the California State Assembly. Chu ran in the 32nd congressional district special election for the seat vacated by Hilda Solis after Solis was confirmed as President Obama's secretary of labor in 2009. She defeated Republican candidate Betty Tom Chu and Libertarian candidate Christopher Agrella in a runoff election on July 14, 2009. Chu was redistricted to the 27th district in 2012, but still reelected to a third term, defeating Republican challenger Jack Orswell.

== Early life and education ==
Chu was born in Los Angeles as the second of four children to May Lin (Chinese: 林春美; 1928–2013) and Judson Chu (Chinese: 趙華進; 1923–2015). Judson was born in Chico, California, to Chinese parents from Jiangmen, Guangdong and served during World War II in the 10th Army Corps in Okinawa. He brought over his wife May from his ancestral home in Xinhui County as a war bride in 1948. Her father worked as a union machinist at Lockheed Corporation and an electrical technician for Pacific Bell, while her mother worked as a Teamsters unionized cannery worker. Her paternal grandfather ran a restaurant in Watts, Los Angeles.

Chu grew up in South Los Angeles, near 62nd Street and Normandie Avenue, until her early teen years, when the family moved to the Bay Area. She graduated Buchser High School in Santa Clara, California in 1970.

In 1974, Chu earned a B.A. degree in mathematics from the University of California, Los Angeles. In 1979, she earned a Ph.D. degree in psychology from the California School of Professional Psychology of Alliant International University's Los Angeles campus. Initially interested in pursuing a career in computer science, Chu attributes Asian American studies and women's studies classes and anti-Vietnam War activism for her decision to pivot to clinical psychology. Her doctoral thesis was regarding the adjustment process of Vietnam War refugees. While in school, she volunteered for a rape crisis center as a victim advocate.

== Career ==
=== Academic ===
Chu taught psychology in the Los Angeles Community College District for 20 years, including 13 years at East Los Angeles College. She also worked as a researcher and lecturer at the UCLA Asian American Studies Center, where she taught Asian American women's studies courses.

=== Local politics ===
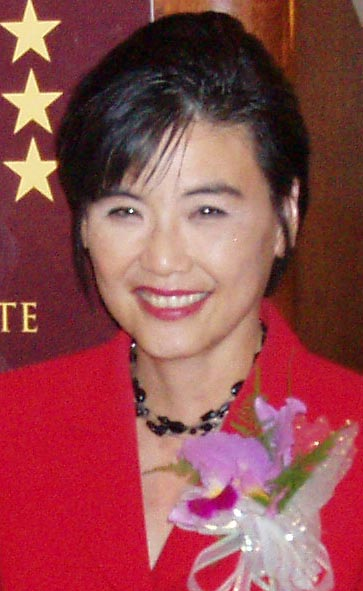
Chu in 2007, while still a member of the Board of Equalization

Prior to electoral politics, Chu had served as the chair of the Los Angeles Unified School District Committee for Sex Equity.

Chu's first elected position was as a member of the Garvey School Board in Rosemead, California in 1985.

In 1988, Chu was elected to the Monterey Park City Council. In 1989, she became Mayor of Monterey Park and served until 1994. Chu was mayor for three terms.

Chu ran for the California State Assembly in 1994, but lost the Democratic primary to the incumbent state assemblymember, Diane Martinez. She had raised $300,000 for the failed bid.

In 1998, Chu ran for the same seat after Martinez termed out. Chu had the backing of the Eastside Democratic Club, while Gloria Romero had the backing of Antonio Villaraigosa, Richard Riordan, and the Los Angeles County Federation of Labor. She narrowly lost the primary to Romero.

Chu was elected to the State Assembly on May 15, 2001, following a special election after Romero was elected to the State Senate. She was elected to a full term in 2002 and reelected in 2004. The district includes Alhambra, El Monte, Duarte, Monterey Park, Rosemead, San Gabriel, San Marino, and South El Monte, within Los Angeles County.

Barred by term limits from running for a third term in 2006, Chu was elected to the State Board of Equalization from the 4th district, representing most of Los Angeles County. During the election, Chu ran on supporting marriage equality. She stated it "would be hypocritical of her not to support same-sex marriage, considering that a century ago the Legislature was using similar rhetoric to prohibit Chinese from marrying whites".

== U.S. House of Representatives ==
=== Elections ===
==== 2009 special ====
Chu decided to run for the 2009 special election for the California's 32nd congressional district after U.S. Representative Hilda Solis was appointed to become President Barack Obama's United States Secretary of Labor. Chu led the field in the May 19 special election, but due to the crowded field (eight Democrats and four Republicans) she only got 32% of the vote, well short of the 50% needed to win outright. In the runoff election, she defeated Republican Betty Chu (her cousin-in-law and a Monterey Park City Councilwoman) 62%–33%.

==== 2010 ====
Chu was heavily favored due to the district's heavy Democrat tilt. With a Cook Partisan Voting Index of D+15, it is one of the safest Democratic districts in the nation. She was reelected to her first full term with 71% of the vote.

==== 2012 ====
In August 2011, Chu decided to run in the newly redrawn California's 27th congressional district. The district has the second highest percentage of Asian Americans in the state with 37%, behind the newly redrawn 17th CD which is 50% Asian. Registered Democrats make up 42% of the district. Obama won the district with 63% in the 2008 presidential election. Jerry Brown won with 55% in the 2010 gubernatorial election. Chu was reelected, defeating Republican Jack Orswell 64% to 36%.

==== 2014 ====
Chu was reelected over Orswell, 59.4% to 40.6%.

==== 2016 ====
Chu was reelected over Orswell, 67.4% to 32.6%.

==== 2018 ====
Chu won reelection over fellow Democrat Bryan Witt by a 79.2% to 20.8% margin, in one of a handful of districts in California that featured only Democrats on its midterm ballot.

==== 2020 ====
Chu won reelection to her seventh term over Republican Johnny J. Nalbandian by a 69.8% to 30.2% margin. Nalbandian never conceded the race, citing unproven voter fraud.

=== Tenure ===
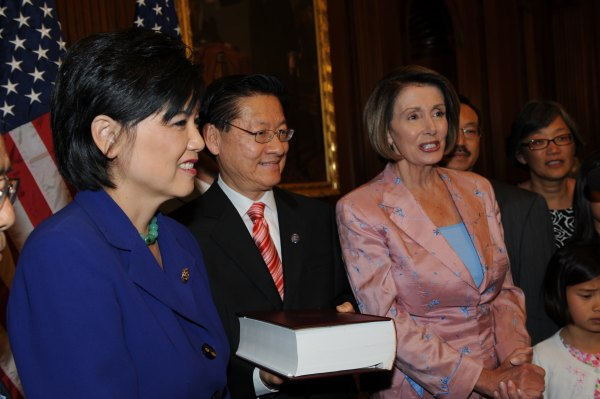
Chu and husband Mike Eng, with Nancy Pelosi, at Chu's Swearing In ceremony for the U.S. House of Representatives

In 2009, Chu voted to increase the debt ceiling to $12.394 trillion. In 2010, she voted to increase the debt ceiling to $14.294 trillion. In January 2011, she voted against a bill to reduce spending on non-security items to fiscal year 2008 levels. In 2011, Chu voted against the Budget Control Act of 2011, which incrementally raised the debt ceiling.

In 2010, she voted against measures proposed by the House to strip government funding to Planned Parenthood, and opposed restricting federal funding of abortions.

Chu opposed the "See Something, Say Something Act of 2011", which provides "immunity for reports of suspected terrorist activity or suspicious behavior and response." She said, "if a person contacts law enforcement about something based solely on someone's race, religion, ethnicity, or national origin, they would not receive immunity from civil lawsuits."

In June 2011, the House Ethics Committee began an investigation after receiving information suggesting that two of Chu's top aides had directed staffers to do campaign tasks during regular work hours. The investigation found that Chu had sent two emails to her staff on how to respond to aspects of the Ethics Committee's inquiry. The Committee found no evidence that Chu was aware of her staff's actions, it did find that the emails represented actions that interfered with the committee's investigation of the matter, and on December 11, 2014, it formally reprimanded Chu for interfering with its investigation of her office.

In 2012, a Chinese spy, Christine "Fang Fang" Fang, volunteered for Chu's campaign and is suspected to have used political connections to spy for the Chinese Communist Party. Chu was one of several Democratic politicians who were targeted. She has received campaign contributions from the People's Mujahedin of Iran (MEK). Chu later voted against a resolution "denouncing the horrors of socialism," and published an op-ed in the Whittier Daily News explaining it.

On December 6, 2017, Chu was arrested during a protest outside of the U.S. Capitol. In 2019, Chu was named "honorary chairwoman" of the Forums for Peaceful Reunification of China, an organization advocating for Chinese unification.

Chu accused Turkey, a NATO member, of inciting the conflict between Armenia and Azerbaijan over the disputed region of Nagorno-Karabakh. On October 1, 2020, she co-signed a letter to Secretary of State Mike Pompeo that condemned Azerbaijan's offensive operations against the Armenian-populated enclave of Nagorno-Karabakh, denounced Turkey's role in the Nagorno-Karabakh conflict and called for an immediate ceasefire.

As of October 2022, Chu had voted in line with Joe Biden's stated position 100% of the time.

=== Committee assignments ===
For the 119th Congress:

- Committee on the Budget
- Committee on Ways and Means
  - Subcommittee on Health
  - Subcommittee on Oversight
  - Subcommittee on Work and Welfare

=== Caucus memberships ===
- American Sikh Congressional Caucus (co-chair)
- Congressional Progressive Caucus (vice-chair)
- Congressional Asian Pacific American Caucus (chair)
- Congressional Caucus for the Equal Rights Amendment (vice-chair)
- Congressional Freethought Caucus
- Congressional Taiwan Caucus
- Creative Rights Caucus (co-founder and co-chair)
- LGBT Equality Caucus
- House Baltic Caucus
- Climate Solutions Caucus
- Medicare for All Caucus
- Congressional Armenian Caucus
- Rare Disease Caucus
- United States–China Working Group

== Political positions ==
During the 117th Congress, Chu voted with President Joe Biden's stated position 99.1% of the time according to a FiveThirtyEight analysis.

=== Abortion ===
Chu claims that abortion access is "not just health care – it is a fundamental human right." She opposed the overturning of Roe v. Wade.

=== Fiscal Responsibility Act of 2023 ===
Chu was among 46 Democrats who voted against final passage of the Fiscal Responsibility Act of 2023 in the House.

=== Israel-Palestine ===
Chu voted to provide Israel with support following the October 7 attacks. However, as of April 20, 2024, she voted against sending aid via H.R. 8034 to Israel, stating "Israel has demonstrated that it can prosecute its war against Hamas without this offensive military assistance from the United States, and the way in which it has done so has resulted in more than 33,000 deaths in Gaza and a worsening humanitarian crisis."

== Personal life ==
Chu married Mike Eng in 1978. They live in Monterey Park, having moved there by the early 1980s. Eng took Chu's seat on the Monterey Park City Council in 2001, when Chu left the council after being elected to the Assembly, and in 2006, he took Chu's seat on the Assembly when Chu left the Assembly.

Chu's nephew, Lance Corporal Harry Lew, a U.S. marine, died by suicide while serving in Afghanistan on April 3, 2011, allegedly as a result of hazing from fellow Marines after Lew allegedly repeatedly fell asleep during his watch. Chu described her nephew as a patriotic American and said that those responsible must be brought to justice.

In December 2019, Chu and her brother Dean Chu donated $375,000 to the Chinese American Museum in Los Angeles, California.

Chu is one of three Unitarian Universalists in Congress.

== See also ==
- History of the Chinese Americans in Los Angeles
- List of Asian Americans and Pacific Islands Americans in the United States Congress
- Women in the United States House of Representatives

Political offices
Preceded by John Chiang	Member of the California State Board of Equalization from the 4th district 2007–2009	Succeeded by Jerome Horton
U.S. House of Representatives
Preceded by Hilda Solis	Member of the U.S. House of Representatives from California's 32nd congressional district 2009–2013	Succeeded by Grace Napolitano
Preceded by Mike Honda	Chair of the Congressional Asian Pacific American Caucus; 2011–2025	Succeeded by Grace Meng
Preceded by Brad Sherman	Member of the U.S. House of Representatives from California's 27th congressional district 2013–2023	Succeeded by Mike Garcia
Preceded by Adam Schiff	Member of the U.S. House of Representatives from California's 28th congressional district 2023–present	Incumbent
U.S. order of precedence (ceremonial)
Preceded by Mike Quigley	United States representatives by seniority 73rd	Succeeded by John Garamendi
