= Spokeo =

People search website

- Company type: Private
- Website type: People search engine
- Available in: English
- Founded: Mountain View, California, U.S. (2006)
- Headquarters: Pasadena, California, U.S.
- Founders: Mike Daly, Harrison Tang, Ray Chen, and Eric Liang
- Key people: Harrison Tang (CEO)
- Industry: Software
- Products: Spokeo
- Website: spokeo.com
- Users: 276 million (2024)
- Launched: November 5, 2006

Spokeo is a people search website that aggregates data from online and offline sources.

== History ==
Spokeo was founded in 2006 as a social media aggregator by four graduates from Stanford University: Mike Daly, Harrison Tang, Ray Chen, and Eric Liang. The four created the site in Tang's parents' basement. On November 5, 2006, the site officially launched, after attracting an initial round of angel investment in the "low hundreds of thousands" according to co-founder Ray Chen.

With the growing dominance of Facebook, there was little demand for social media aggregators, so Spokeo adjusted its offerings to provide people's contact information as well. The site nearly failed during the 2008 financial crisis, forcing Tang and the other founders to get loans from their parents. Spokeo later evolved to become an information-gathering website that offers various options for finding information about people, including income, religion, spouse's name, credit status, the number of people in the household, a satellite shot of the house and its estimated value. The company's revenues for 2014 were $57 million, and as of 2015, the site had 18 million users.

In 2010, a class action lawsuit was filed against Spokeo seeking injunctive relief and monetary damages for an alleged violation of the Fair Credit Reporting Act (FCRA). A dispute over the plaintiff's standing advanced to the Supreme Court of the United States in Spokeo, Inc. v. Robins, which remanded the case to the appeals court. The case was settled through mediation in March 2019.

In 2012, the Federal Trade Commission (FTC) fined Spokeo $800,000 for marketing information to human resource departments for employment screening without adhering to consumer protection provided by the FCRA — the first FTC fine involving personal data collected online and sold to potential employers. The company is also required to submit compliance reports to the FTC for twenty years.

== Technology ==
Spokeo utilizes deep web crawlers to aggregate data. Searches can be made for a name, email, phone number, username or address. The site allows users to remove information about themselves through an opt-out process that requires the URL of the listing and a valid email address. The firm aggregates information from public records and does not do original research into personal data. It aggregates marketing data approximations into the data it finds from social media and online registry sites. The company gives users access to 12 billion public records.

Spokeo also runs Search Angels, which uses "volunteers who use Spokeo to help those touched by adoption, foster care and other family separations to find long-lost family members while also offering emotional support."

In 2024, Spokeo announced a Right-Party Contact Tool as part of its "Spokeo for Business" offering.

== Privacy ==
Larry Ponemon has raised concerns about the general practice of gathering personal data and the potential for identity theft. In 2019, Spokeo's CEO announced plans to make Spokeo's data collection more transparent and offer "the easiest opt-out policy among the competitors", but USA Today noted it was still "hidden at the bottom of a privacy page".

== See also ==
- Federated search
- Information broker
- Privacy laws of the United States
