= Barth (surname) =

Barth is a surname, and may refer to:

- Agnar Johannes Barth (1871–1948), Norwegian forester
- Alan Barth (1906–1979), American journalist and author
- Alice Barth (1848–1910), English operatic soprano
- Alison Barth, American neuroscientist
- André Barth (born 1969), German politician
- Andy Barth (born 1947), American journalist
- Antonie Barth (1871-1956), German actress and aristocrat
- Auguste Barth (1834–1916), French orientalist
- Beatrice Barth (1877–1966), New Zealand piano teacher
- Belle Barth (1911–1971), American comedian
- Bernd-Rainer Barth (born 1957), German historian
- Bill Barth (1942–2000), American blues guitarist
- Bjarne Keyser Barth (1892–1972), Norwegian Army officer
- Bjørn Barth (1931–2014), Norwegian diplomat and ambassador
- Bobby Barth (born 1952), American singer-songwriter
- Bruce Barth (born 1958), American jazz pianist and composer
- Carl Friedrich Barth (1734–1813), German musician and music copyist
- Carl Georg Barth (1860–1939), Norwegian-American mathematician
- Carl Wilhelm Bøckmann Barth (1847–1919), Norwegian military officer and painter
- Carmen Barth (1912–1985), American boxer
- Carrie Barth, American politician
- Casey Barth (born 1990), American football player
- Charles H. Barth (1858–1926), United States Army general
- Charles H. Barth Jr. (1903–1943), United States Army general
- Chris Barth (born 1980), American singer-songwriter
- Christian Frederik Barth (1787–1861), Danish oboist and composer
- Christian Gottlob Barth (1799–1862), German writer of children's bible stories
- Christian Samuel Barth (1735–1809), German oboist and composer
- Claudia Barth (born 1975), German rower
- Connor Barth (born 1986), American football player
- Dennis Barth (1951–1978), Jamaican criminal
- Eddie Barth (1931–2010), American actor
- Edgar Barth (1917–1965), German racing driver
- Edvard Kaurin Barth (1913–1996), Norwegian zoologist and photographer
- Elke Barth (born 1956), German sprinter
- Else M. Barth (1928–2015), Norwegian philosopher
- Emil Barth (1879–1941), German politician
- Erwin Barth (1880–1933), German architect
- Frances Barth (born 1946), American artist
- Frederik Philip Carl August Barth (1775–1804), German-Danish oboist and composer
- Fredrik Barth (1928–2016), Norwegian anthropologist
- Fredy Barth (born 1979), Swiss racing driver
- Friederike Barth (born 1975), German field hockey player
- Friedrich Gottlieb Barth (1738–1794), German philologist and writer
- Frode Barth (born 1968), Norwegian musician
- G. Christian Barth (1883–1965), Lutheran minister and college president
- Gene Barth (1930–1991), American football official
- Gunther Barth (1925–2004), American historian
- Heidrun Barth (born 1961), German rower
- Heinrich Barth (1821–1865), German explorer
- Heinz Barth (1920-2007), WW2 Nazi SS officer & war criminal
- Hermann von Barth (1845–1876), German mountaineer
- Hugo Barth (1903–1976), German decathlete
- Isolde Barth (born 1948), German actress
- Jack Barth (born 1956), American screenwriter and author
- Jacob Bøckmann Barth (1822–1892), Norwegian forester
- Jacob William Barth (1871–1941), British lawyer
- Janet Barth, American radiation engineer
- Jean Baptiste Barth (1806–1877), French pathologist
- Jean Joseph de Barth (1726–1793), French politician
- Jessica Barth, American stage and film actress
- John Barth (1930–2024), American writer
- John Barth (American football) (1927–2004), American football and basketball coach
- John Barth (politician) (born 1826), American politician
- John F. Barth (1874–1947), American composer
- Joseph Barth (1746–1818), Austrian ophthalmologist
- Jürgen Barth (born 1947), German racing driver
- Jürgen Barth (cyclist) (1943–2011), German cyclist
- Karl Barth (1886–1968), Swiss Protestant theologian
- Karl Heinrich Barth (1847–1922), German musician
- Karl L. Barth (1924–2020), Lutheran minister and seminary president
- Kaspar von Barth (1587–1658), German philologist
- Klara Barth (1880–1940), German politician
- Kurt Barth (born 1976), American football player and coach
- Lea Sophie Barth (born 1998), German canoeist
- Leen Barth (born 1952), Dutch football player
- Lori Barth, American songwriter
- Louis de Barth (1764–1844), Franco-American Roman Catholic priest
- Luis Moglia Barth, Argentine film director and screenwriter
- Manfred Barth (born 1945), German archer
- Mario Barth (born 1972), German comedian
- Marisa Ferretti Barth (1931–2021), Canadian politician
- Markus Barth (1915–1994), Swiss Protestant Reformed theologian
- Marleen Barth (born 1964), Dutch politician
- Matthew Barth, American electrical engineer
- Merle Barth (born 1994), German footballer
- Oliver Barth (born 1979), German footballer
- Otto Barth (artist) (1876–1916), Austrian artist
- Otto Barth (general) (1891–1963), German general
- Paul Barth (fencer) (1921–1974), Swiss fencer
- Paul Barth (judoka) (1945–2026), West German judoka
- Paul Barth (sociologist) (1858–1922), German sociologist
- Paul C. Barth (1858–1907), American politician
- Peter F. Barth (born 1956), American Buddhist teacher
- Philip Barth (born 1976), German yacht racer
- Rebecca Barth
- René Barth (born 1963), Swiss handball player
- Richard Barth (1850–1923), German musician
- Robert Barth (born 1968), German motorcycle speedway rider
- Robert Barth (resistance fighter) (1910–1945), German communist and resistance fighter
- Robert A. Barth (1930–2020), American quartermaster and aquanaut
- Roy Barth (born 1947), American tennis player
- Sawyer Barth (born 2001), American actor
- Siegfried Barth (1916–1997), German World War II bomber pilot
- Signe Barth (1895–1982), Swedish painter and educator
- Sonja Barth (1923–2016), Norwegian environmentalist
- Sven Barth (born 1980), German racing driver
- Theodor Barth (1849–1909), German politician and publicist
- Theodore N. Barth (1898–1961), American Episcopal bishop
- Thomas Barth (born 1960), German cyclist
- Thomas Barth (politician) (born 1977), German politician
- Uta Barth (born 1958), German-American photographer
- Uwe Barth (born 1964), German politician and member of the FDP
- Wilhelm Herman Barth (1813–1896), Danish musician, composer, and music theorist
- Wolf Barth (1942–2016), German mathematician

== See also ==
- Bath (surname)
- Bart (surname)
- Berth (surname)
