= Bath (surname) =

Bath is a surname. Notable people with the surname include:

- Brian Bath (1947–2014), South African cricketer
- Chris Bath (born 1967), Australian journalist and television personality
- Corinna Bath (born 1963), German computer scientist
- Edwin Bath (1873–1948), Australian politician
- Elizabeth Bath (1776–1844), English poet
- Elliot Bath (born 1992), English cricketer
- Evamaria Bath (1929–2023), German actress
- Harry Bath (1924–2008), Australian rugby league footballer and coach
- Hubert Bath (1883–1945), English film composer and music director
- James Bath (headmaster) (1830–1901), South Australian educator and public servant
- James R. Bath (born 1936), American businessman
- John Bath (fl. 1960s), British rugby league player
- John Morley Bath (1880–1946), South Australian publisher and businessman
- Jonas Mohammed Bath, Trinidad community and religious leader
- Joyce Bath (1925–2006), Australian cricketer
- Melina Bath (born 1966), Australian politician
- Michael Bath (born 1966), Royal Navy admiral
- Mike Bath (born 1977), American college football coach and former player
- Patricia Bath (1942–2019), American ophthalmologist
- Patrick Bath (fl. 1592–1607), Irish Capuchin friar
- Philip Bath (born 1956), British clinician scientist
- Raymond Bath (born 1944), South African cricketer
- Robert Bath (born 1936), Australian boxer
- Ronald J. Bath (born 1944), United States Air Force general
- Thomas Bath (1875–1956), Australian politician and trade unionist
- Tony Bath (1926–2000), British wargamer

== See also ==
- Bathe (surname)
- Barth (surname)
- Earl of Bath
- Marquess of Bath
