= Dates of Epoch-Making Events =

Entry in The Nuttall Encyclopædia (1900)

- Author: James Wood
- Type: Encyclopaedia entry
- Contained in: The Nuttall Encyclopaedia
- Release Date: 1900

"Dates of Epoch-Making Events" is an entry in The Nuttall Encyclopaedia for its listing of the most important turning points in history, particularly western history. The work's list illustrates western culture's turning points and James Wood's views from the early 20th century. The events are listed as in the original listing, with modern footnotes.

== Historical events ==
The events chosen, with few errors, are:

Images of epic events

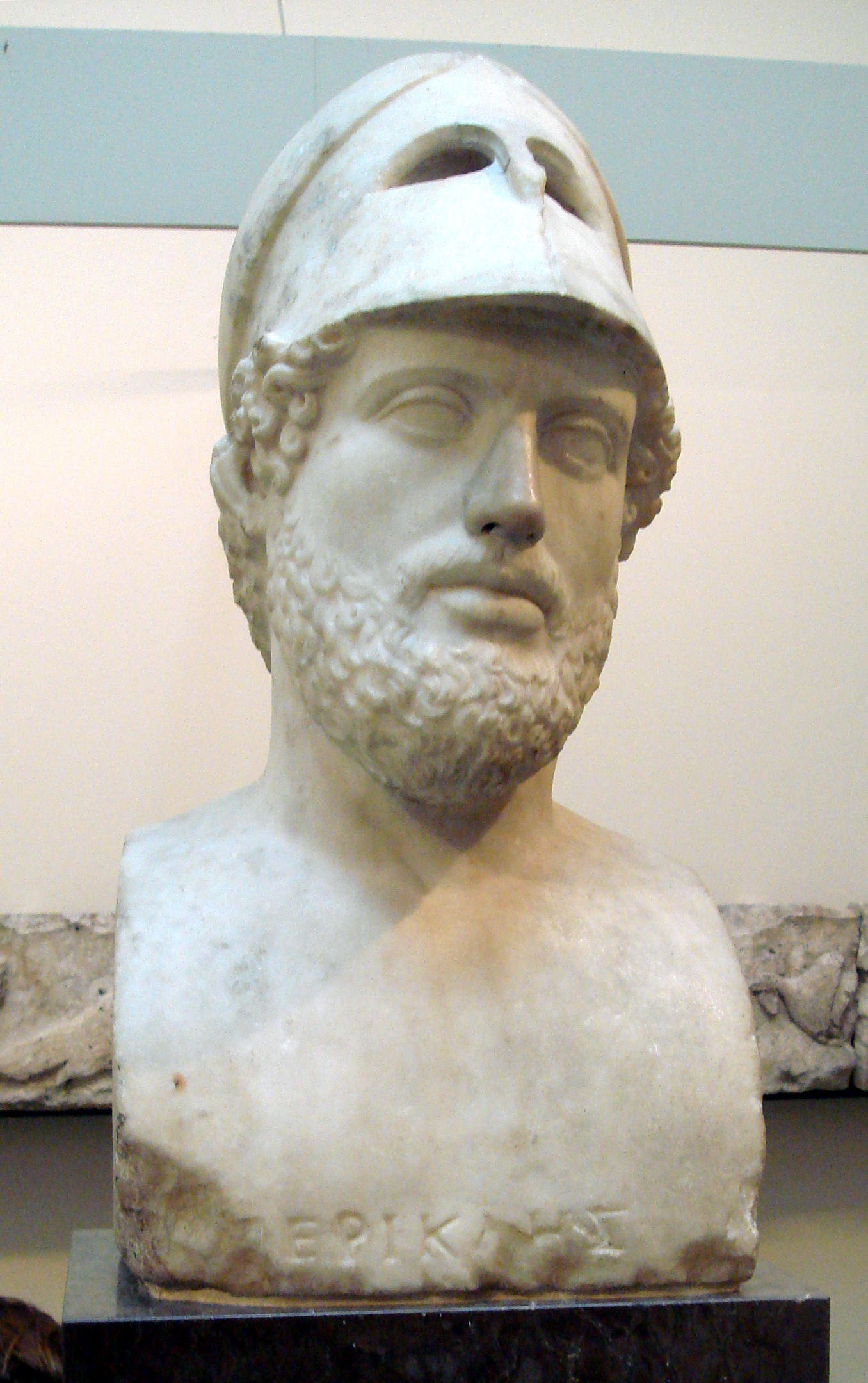
Age of Pericles

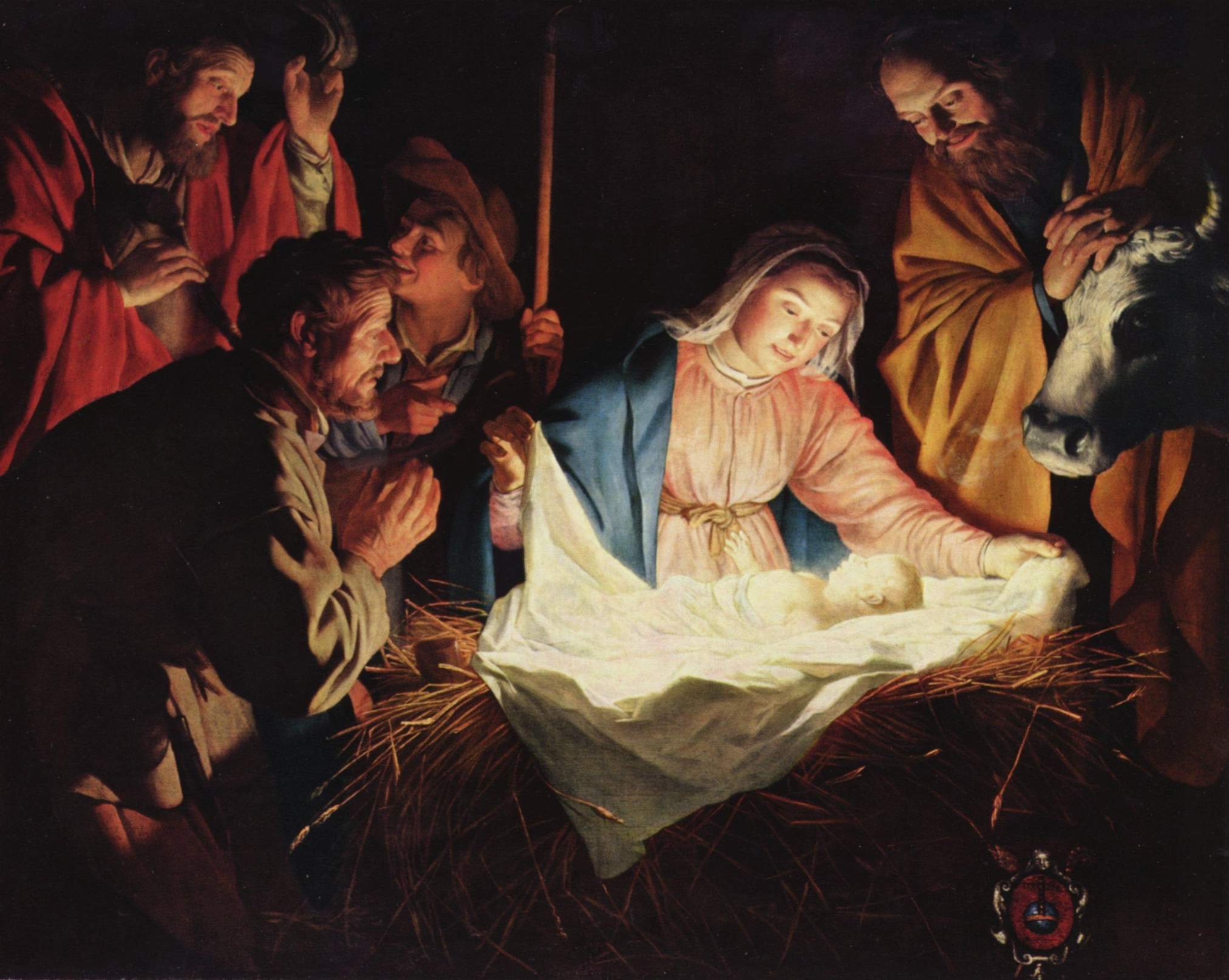
Birth of Jesus

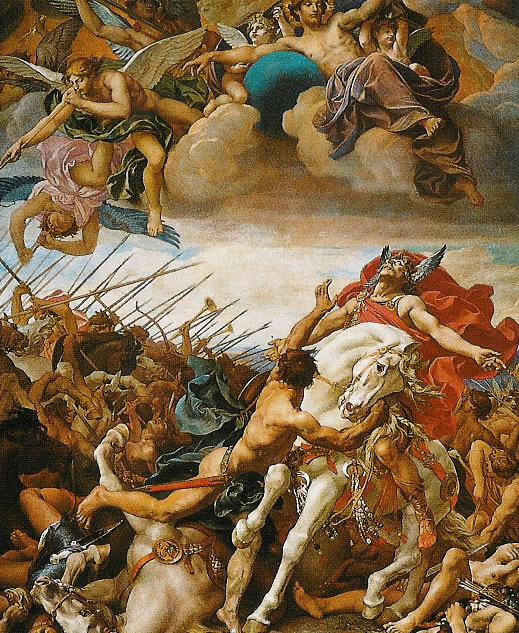
Clovis I at the Battle of Tolbiac.

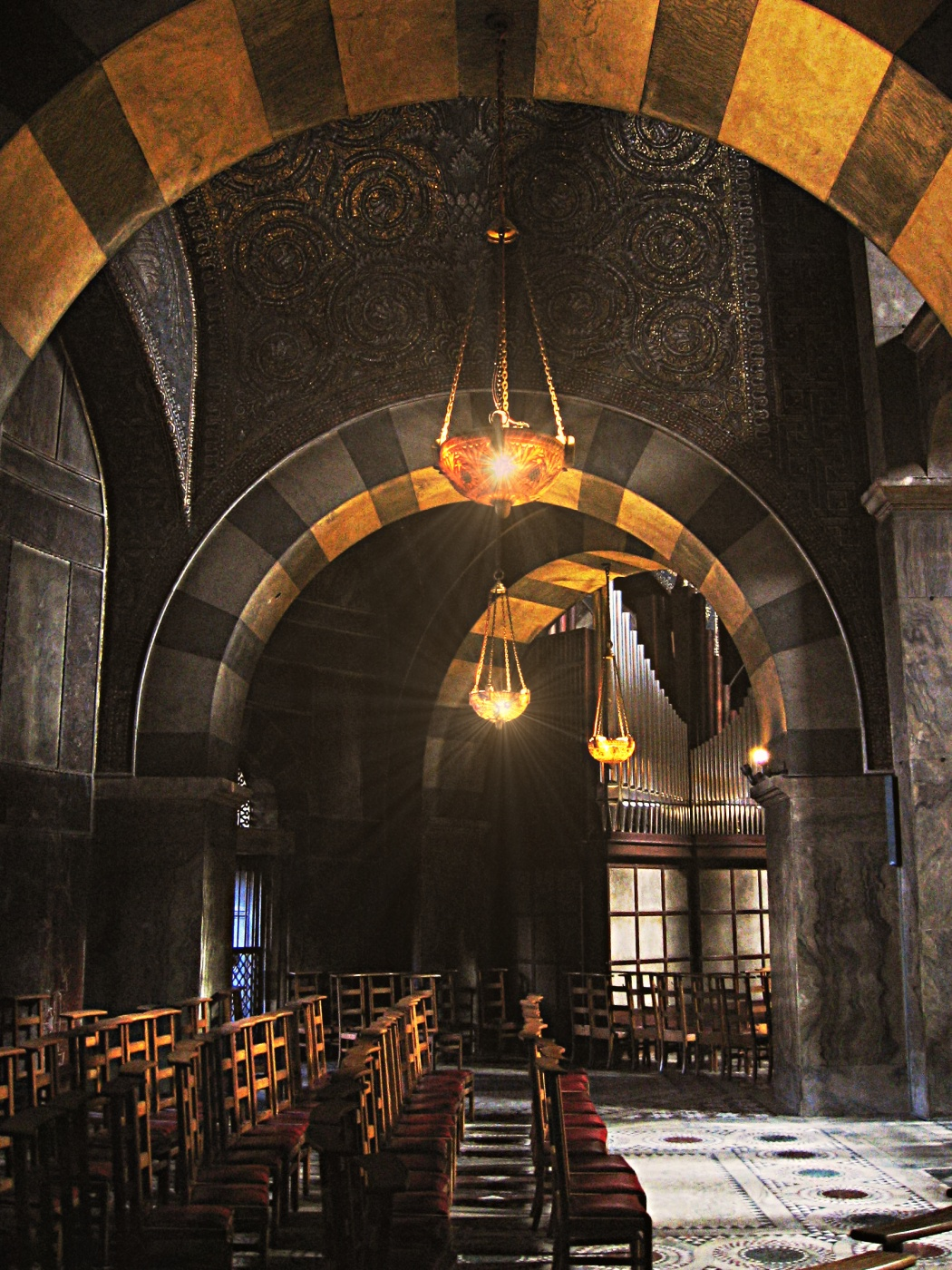
Charlemagne Coronations

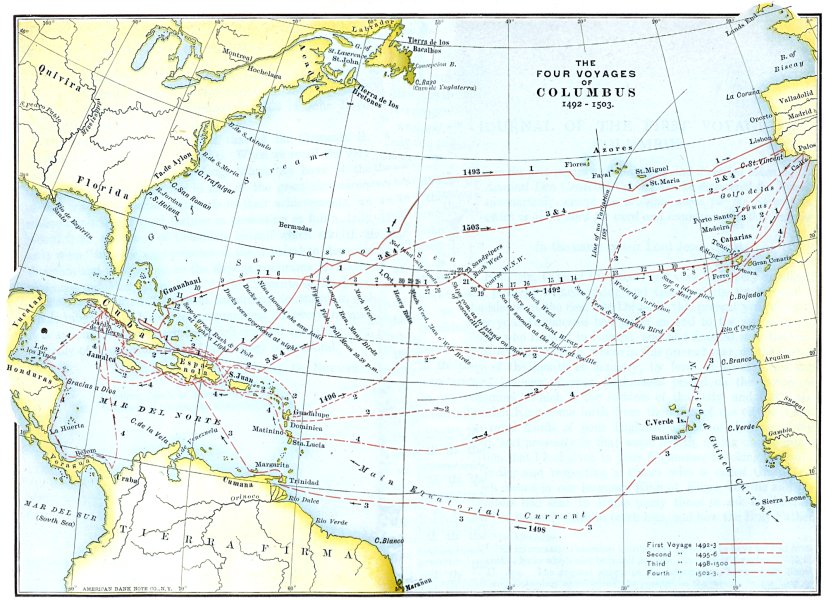
Voyages of Columbus

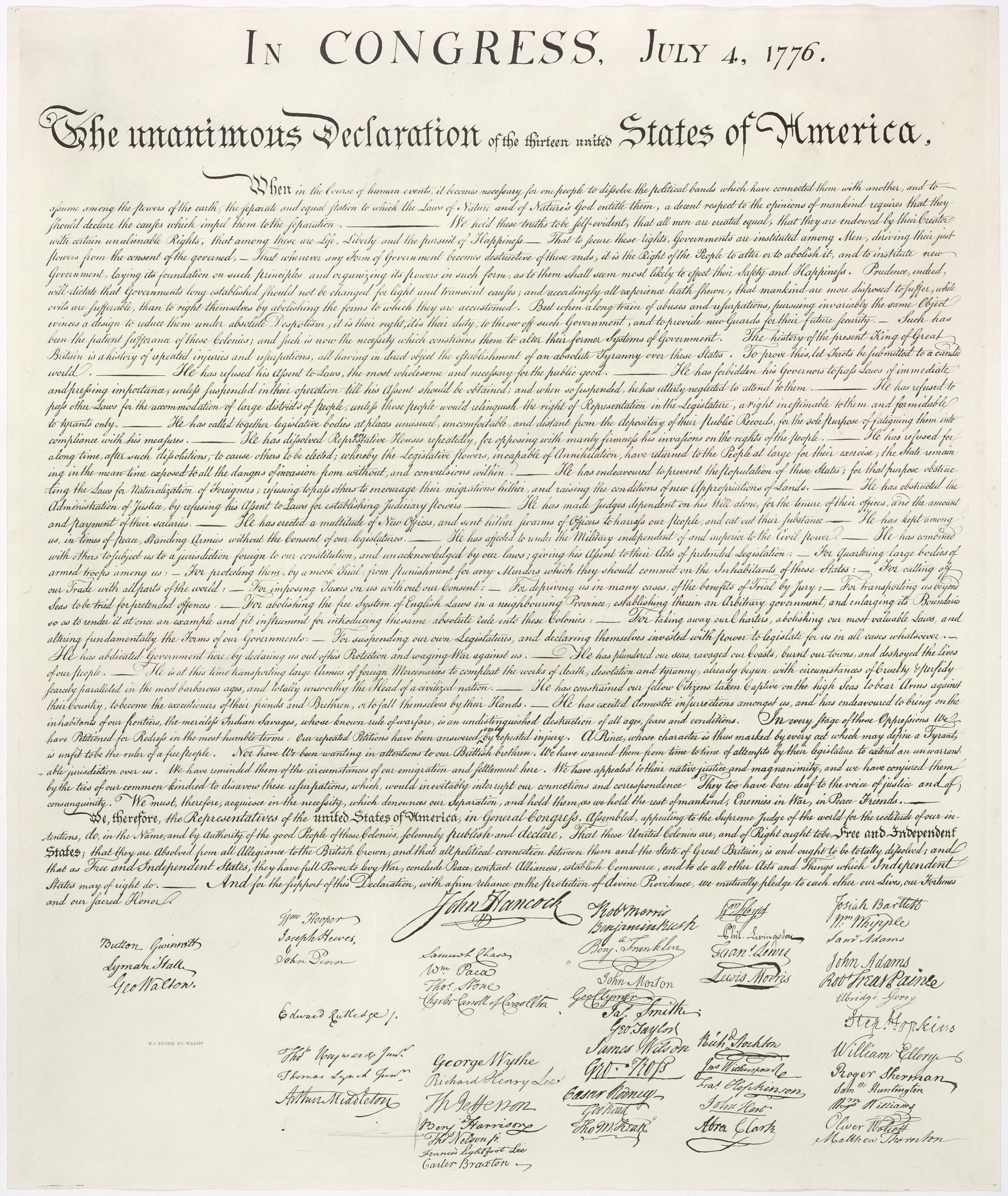
Declaration of Independence

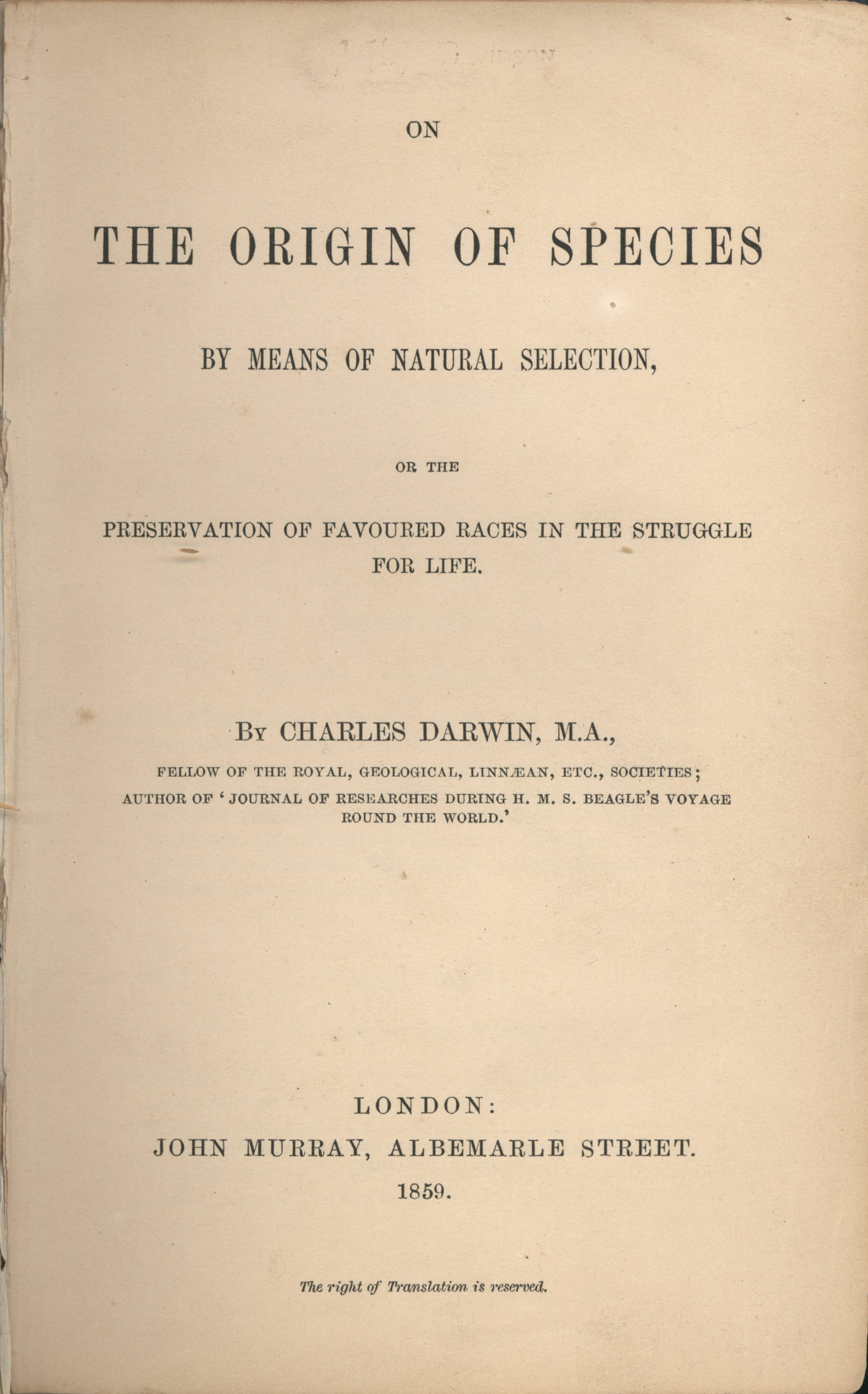
Darwin's On the Origin of Species

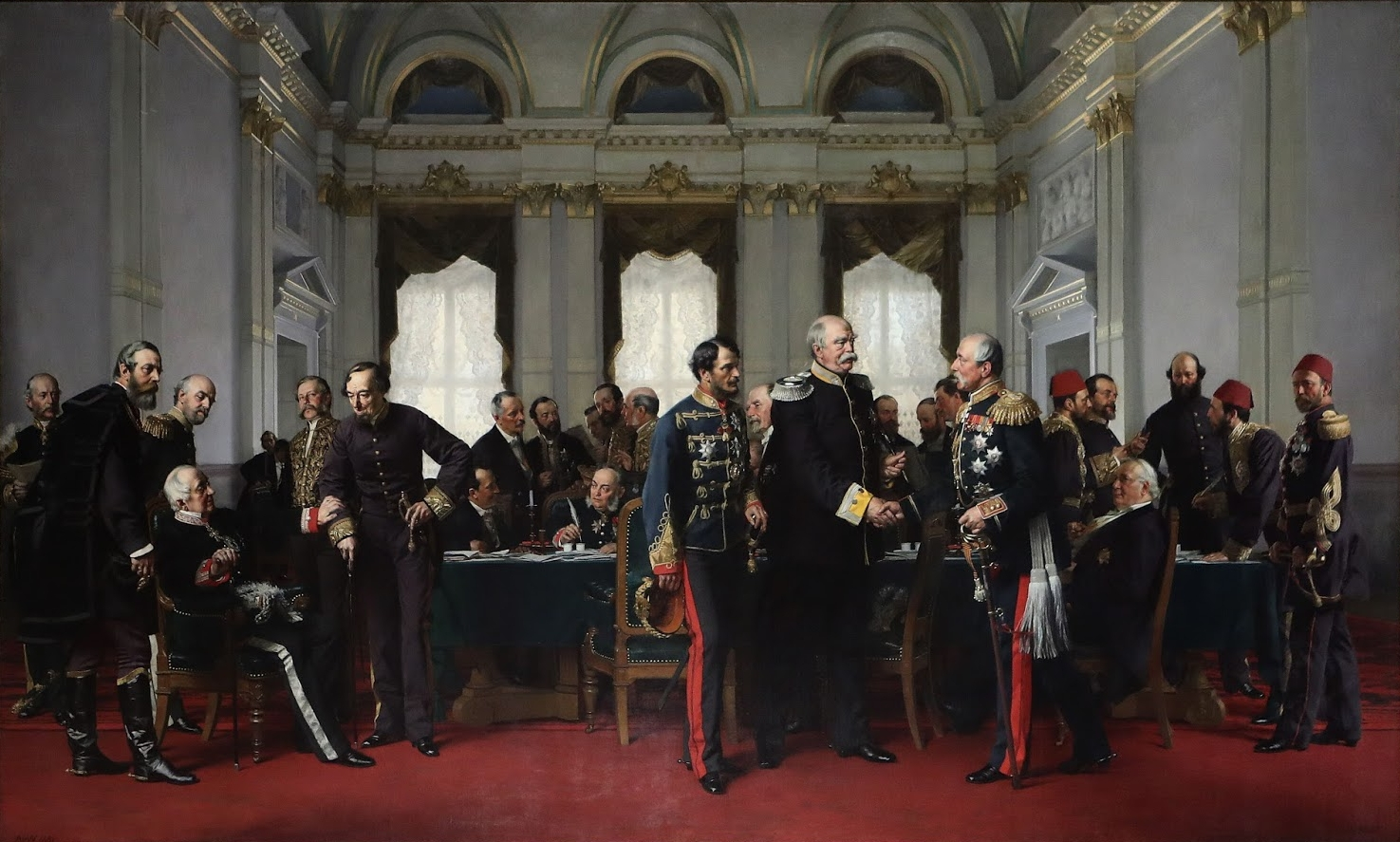
Anton von Werner. Congress of Berlin.

=== Event listing ===
- The Ascendency in Athens of Pericles (445 BC)
- The Fall of the Persian Empire (330 BC)
- The Death of Alexander the Great (323 BC)
- The Reduction of Greece to a Roman province, and the Ruin of Carthage (146 BC)
- The Battle of Actium (31 BC)
- Birth of Christ, 14th year of Augustus
- Commencement of the Middle Ages (395)
- Ruin of the Roman Empire by the Barbarians (476)
- Clovis, ruler of Gaul (509)
- The Flight of Mahomet (622)
- Charlemagne, Emperor of the West (800)
- Treaty of Verdun (843)
- The Crusades (1096–1291)
- Employment of Cannon at Crécy (1346)
- Invention of Printing (1436)
- Taking of Constantinople by Mehmed II (1453)
- Discovery of America by Columbus (1492)
- Copernican System published (c. 1500)
- Accession of Leo X as Pope (1513)
- The Reformation of Luther (1517)
- Publication of Bacon's Novum Organon (1620)
- Publication of Descartes's Discourse on Method (1637)
- The Peace of Westphalia (1648)
- Reign of Louis XIV at its Height, and Peace of Nimeguen (1678)
- Publication of Newton's Theory of Gravitation (1682)
- Watt's Invention of the Steam-Engine (1769)
- Independence of the United States (1776)
- Coup d'état of 10 Brumaire (1799)
- Waterloo, and Congress of Vienna (1815)
- Introduction of Railroads into England (1830)
- First Attempt at Electric Telegraphy in France (1837)
- Africa traversed by Livingstone (1852–1854)
- Publication of Darwin's Origin of Species (1859)
- Opening of the Suez Canal (1869)
- Proclamation of the German Empire (1871)
- Congress of Berlin (1878)
