= James Wood (encyclopaedist) =

Scottish Presbyterian minister and encyclopaedist

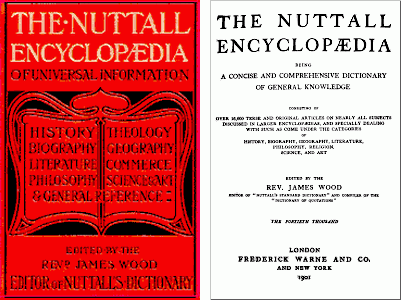
Cover and title page of the Nuttall Encyclopædia, ed. by Wood (Frederick Warne and Co., 1901)

James Wood (12 October 1820 – 17 March 1901) was a Scottish writer, editor, and Free Church minister.

== Life ==
Born in Leith, Wood studied at the University of Edinburgh and was ordained as a minister of the Free Church of Scotland, following the Disruption of 1843. His admiration for Thomas Carlyle and John Ruskin may have contributed to his failure to secure the ministry of a congregation. Instead, he earned a living as a writer and editor and spent most of his life in Edinburgh.

Wood is described by P. J. E. Wilson as " that most conscientious of pedants".

In his anonymous The Strait Gate (1881), Wood says of himself that he should not be classed with the High churchmen, the Evangelicals, or the Broad churchmen. He had "no faith whatsoever" in the first group, "no true conception" of the second, and "a measure of sympathy" with the third, but added "…yet there are drawbacks which make it impossible for me to hail their movement with any warmth."

== Publications ==
In 1867, Wood's Stories from Greek Mythology was published in London. Wood edited Nuttall's Standard Dictionary and The Nuttall Encyclopaedia. In 1881, he published anonymously The Strait Gate and Other Discourses, with a Lecture on Thomas Carlyle, by a Scotch Preacher, and in 1882 made the authorised translation of Auguste Barth's Religions of India. In 1893, after working on it for three years, he published his Dictionary of Quotations, later renamed as Nuttall's Dictionary of Quotations. He was also the author of Bagster & Sons' Helps to the Bible and a Carlyle School Reader.
