= Yokuba =

Yokuba is listed in the Nuttall Encyclopaedia as the largest town in Sokoto State, in the Lower Soudan, with a large trade in cotton, tobacco, and indigo plant. It states that, at the time of writing, the town had a population of 150,000.

Sokoto is now a province in Nigeria but was at one time a much larger kingdom (see Sokoto for details). In the 19th century both Sokoto and Soudan referred to larger geographic areas than they do today, so it uncertain what, if any, modern town Nuttall was referring to.

Oddly, the eleventh edition of the Encyclopædia Britannica, published just four years after the Nuttall Encyclopedia (and shortly after the federation of Nigeria), makes no mention of the town and does not show it on its map of the new nation, despite a considerable number of towns being shown in the Sokoto region.
