= John Barth (disambiguation) =

John Barth (1930–2024) was an American writer.

John Barth may also refer to:

- John Barth (politician) (born 1826), German-born American politician
- John Barth (American football) (1927–2004), American football player
- John F. Barth (1874–1947), American composer
