= Bathe (surname) =

Bathe is a surname of English and German origin. Patrick Hanks postulates the English surname is a toponym derived from either the city of Bath or the village of Bathe Barton, and the German surname is derived from a German name using the word badu (battle). Notable people with the surname include:

- Bill Bathe (born 1960), American baseball player
- Carrlyn Bathe (born 1988), American sports broadcaster
- Charlotte Bathe (born 1965), British equestrian
- Frank Bathe (born 1954), Canadian ice hockey player
- Sir Henry de Bathe, 4th Baronet (1823–1907), British Army general
- James Bathe (c.1500–1570), Irish judge
- John Bathe (disambiguation), multiple people
- Klaus-Jürgen Bathe (born 1943), German civil engineer
- Ryan Michelle Bathe (born 1976), American actress
- Thomas Bathe, 1st Baron Louth (died 1478), Irish barrister and judge
- Walter Bathe (1892–1959), German swimmer
- William Bathe (judge) (c. 1530–1597), Irish judge and landowner
- William Bathe (1564–1614), Anglo-Irish Jesuit priest, musician, and writer

== See also ==
- Bath (surname)
- Bather (surname)
