= San Gabriel High School =

Location
- 801 South Ramona Street; San Gabriel, California 91776; United States; 34.09270°N 118.10968°W

Information
- Type: Public high school
- Motto: Carpe Bos Cornu
- Established: 1955
- Principal: Jocelyn Castro
- Teaching staff: 78.46 (FTE)
- Grades: 9–12
- Enrollment: 1,768 (2023-2024)
- Student to teacher ratio: 22.53
- Colors: Royal blue and crimson
- Athletics conference: Almont League; CIF Southern Section
- Mascot: Gabriel the Bull
- Team name: Matadors
- Newspaper: The Matador
- Yearbook: El Camino Real
- Website: www.sghsmatadors.org

San Gabriel High School (SGHS) is a public high school located in Los Angeles County, California and operated by the Alhambra Unified School District. It is almost entirely in the city limits of Alhambra, with a small portion and the school's address in the city limits of San Gabriel.

It traditionally served students residing in San Gabriel although the balance was shifted in 1994 when San Gabriel Unified School District separated itself from Alhambra Unified. Upon separation, SGUSD opened Gabrielino High School to serve its students. San Gabriel High School now serves students from portions of Alhambra, San Gabriel, and Rosemead.

== History ==
In 1955, San Gabriel High School began. It has been open with a couple of new buildings being built since then.

== Principals ==
- Arthur H. Kruger (1955–1971)
- R. Reed Channell (1971–1975)
- Elizabeth C. Luttrell (1975–1977)
- Jack B. Mount (1977–1996)
- Linda Marryott (1996–1998)
- Barbara Randolph (1998–2000)
- Alex Ayala (2000–2004)
- Marsha Gilbert (2004–2007)
- Jim Schofield (2007–2015)
- Debbie Stone (2015–2024)
- Jocelyn Castro (2024–Present)

== Academics ==
Students of San Gabriel High should complete 220 credits in order to graduate. San Gabriel offers 15 Advanced Placement (AP) courses including: English language, English literature, Calculus AB, Calculus BC, Statistics, World History, US History, American Government, Chemistry, Biology, Physics 1, Psychology, Spanish language, Chinese language, and Art History.

San Gabriel High School has been accredited by the Western Association of Schools and Colleges—for the first time in 1966 and most recently in 2022, for a fixed term after each evaluation.

== Football ==
The San Gabriel Football Team won a CIF Division 13 Championship in 2022. The football team was also CIF Division 14 runner ups in 2024.

=== Cross country ===
The San Gabriel Cross Country team took 4th in State in 1991, led by a Cross Country champion, Angel Martinez.

== School demographics ==
The school has 2,429 students and 76 full-time teachers. The ethnic composition of San Gabriel High School is 57.1% Asian, 41% Hispanic, 1% White, 1% Two or More Races, 0.2% African American, and 0.1% Pacific Islander.

== 1988 hostage incident ==
Jeffrey Lyne Cox, a senior at San Gabriel High School, took an AR-15 semi-automatic rifle to school on April 26, 1988, and held a humanities class of about 60 students hostage for over 30 minutes. Cox held the gun to one student when the teacher doubted Cox would cause harm and stated that he would prove it to her. At that time three students escaped out a rear door and were fired upon. Cox was later tackled and disarmed by another student. A friend of Cox's told the press that Cox had been inspired by the Kuwait Airways Flight 422 hijacking and by the Stephen King novel Rage, which Cox had read over and over again and with which he strongly identified. After the jury deadlocked, Cox pleaded no contest to charges of kidnapping and assault with a deadly weapon—both of which are felony offenses. He was sentenced to five years in prison.

== Notable alumni ==
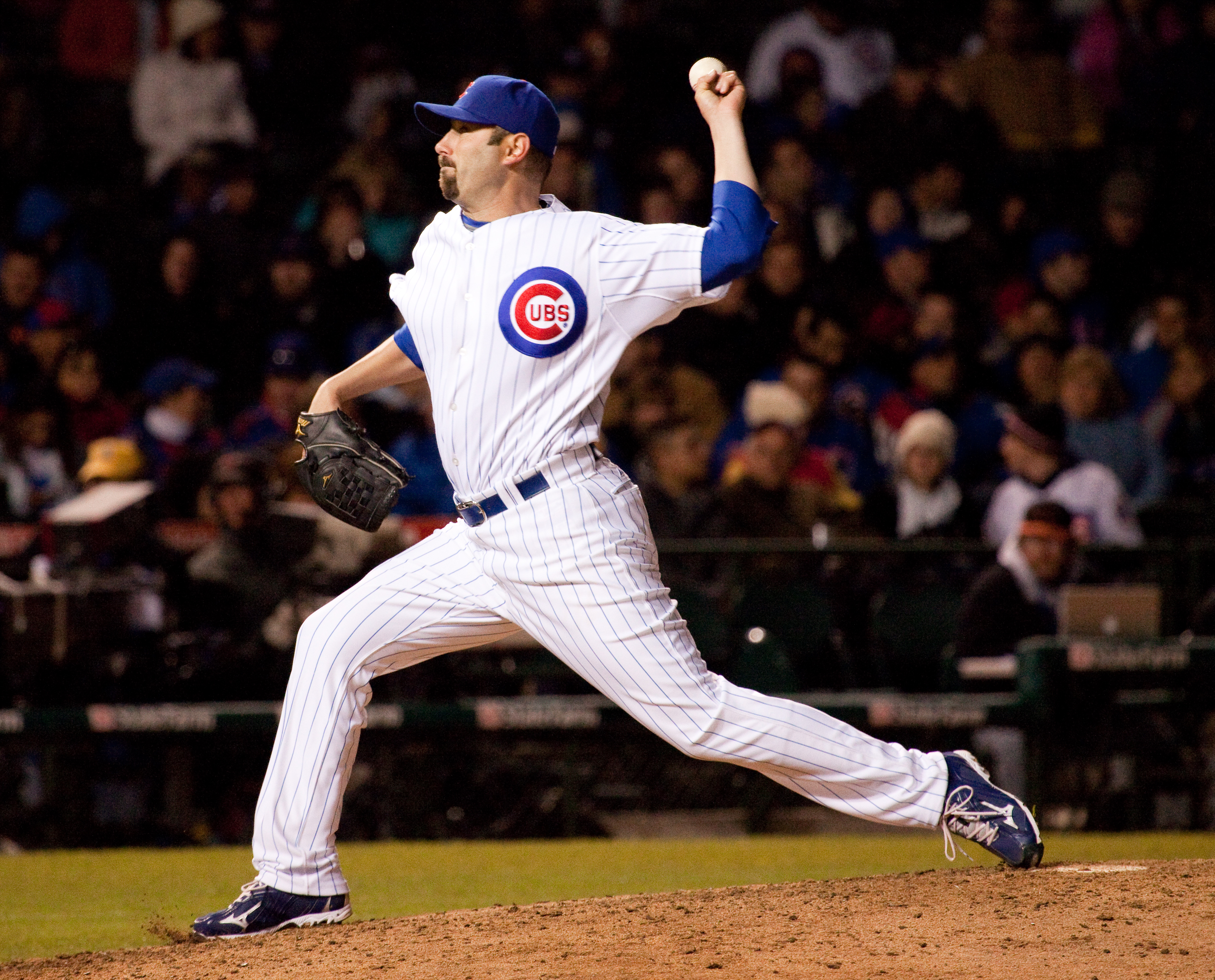
John Grabow

- John Andrews, professional baseball player
- Roy Conli, Academy Award winning producer
- Venus D-Lite, drag queen
- George Dyer, football coach
- Bill Fisk, football coach
- John Grabow, MLB pitcher
- Felicia Hano, artistic gymnast
- David Henry Hwang, dramatist
- Candy Johnson, singer and dancer
- Mike Krukow, MLB pitcher, commentator
- Miguel Lopez, soccer player
- Steve Martini, legal thriller author
- Sylvia Mosqueda, Distance Runner
- C. Rob Orr, All-American/Pan Am Games medalist-swimmer; coach
- Robert J. Sandoval, judge
- Edgar Varela, professional baseball coach
