= Steve Martini =

American writer of legal novels (born 1946)

- Born: Steven Paul Martini; February 28, 1946 (age 80); San Francisco, California, U.S.
- Education: University of California, Santa Cruz; McGeorge School of Law
- Occupation: Novelist
- Known for: Paul Madriani Series

Steven Paul "Steve" Martini (born February 28, 1946) is an American writer of legal novels.

== Early years ==
Born on February 28, 1946, in San Francisco, California, Steve Martini was raised until the age of ten in the Colma area of Daly City just south of San Francisco. He is part of a large extended Italian-American family, some of which reach back four generations in California. Martini's mother and father moved to Los Angeles County, California, in 1956. His father, Ernest Martini, was a rancher, managing and owning farms throughout California during his lifetime. His mother, Rita, was a housewife, though in later years she worked extensively in the local library in San Gabriel, California. Martini graduated from San Gabriel Mission Grammar School, San Gabriel High School and Pasadena City College before transferring to the University of California, Santa Cruz where he graduated in 1968 with a degree in government (Political Science).

== Professional and legal career ==
Martini's first career was in journalism. He worked as a newspaper reporter for the Los Angeles Daily Journal, the largest legal newspaper in the country covering the state, the local courts and the civic center beat. In 1970 he became the newspaper's first correspondent at the State Capitol in Sacramento and later its bureau chief. There he specialized in legal and political coverage. During this period he attended night law school and in 1974 took his J.D. degree from the University of the Pacific's McGeorge School of Law. He was admitted to the bar in January 1975.

Martini has practiced law both privately as well as for public agencies, appearing in state and federal courts. During his legal career, in addition to other activities, he worked as a legislative representative for the California Department of Consumer Affairs, the State Bar of California, and served as special counsel to the California Victims of Violent Crimes Program. He has worked as an administrative hearing officer, a supervising hearing officer, an administrative law judge, and for a time served as deputy director of the State Office of Administrative Hearings. He is currently inactive with the State Bar of California, choosing writing instead as a full-time occupation.

== Writing career ==
In the mid-1980s Martini began his fiction-writing career. His first attempt at a novel, The Simeon Chamber, was represented by an agent and sold to the New York publisher D.I. Fine within two weeks of its submission. It was published in 1987. Compelling Evidence, his second novel, introduced his series character, attorney Paul Madriani, and was published by G.P. Putnam & Sons. A national bestseller, the novel earned Martini a critical and popular following. It was followed quickly by New York Times bestsellers Prime Witness, Undue Influence, The Judge, and The Attorney, each featuring the series character Madriani and his contrarian and irrepressible law partner, Harry Hinds.

The List, published in 1997, a novel and thriller about the commercial book publishing industry, was the first Martini novel to depart from the series characters since the author reached the best sellers list. Critical Mass, his next novel published in 1998, continued the departure from the courtroom as well as the Madriani series, though it involved a lawyer protagonist and was well within the legal-thriller genre. Critical Mass addressed issues of terrorism and the threat from weapons of mass destruction two years before the events of 9/11. It was a topic to which Martini would return in later years.

Other novels by Martini include: The Jury, The Arraignment, Double Tap, Shadow of Power, Guardian of Lies, The Rule of Nine, and Trader of Secrets.

To date, two network mini-series have been produced and broadcast based on Martini's works, Undue Influence by CBS, and The Judge on NBC.

Since the 2016 release of Blood Flag, no updates regarding any new books or new works in the pipeline have been posted on Martini's website. A new book due out in 2017, The Secret Partner, was shown on websites that list upcoming releases, but after multiple changes in its release date, it has been shown with no release date information since 2019.

== Personal life ==
Steve Martini was previously married to the former Wanda Leah Martini, now Leah Martini-Puhlman. They have one daughter. Mr. Martini is currently married to Chatngoen Chuangchai Martini. Steve Martini currently resides in northwest Washington state but spends much of his time in Latin America and Southeast Asia where he writes, travels and acquires research and color for future works.

== Bibliography ==
=== Paul Madriani Series ===
1. Compelling Evidence (1992)
2. Prime Witness (1993)
3. Undue Influence (1994)
4. The Judge (1996)
5. The Attorney (1999)
6. The Jury (2001)
7. The Arraignment (2003)
8. Double Tap (2005)
9. Shadow of Power (2008)
10. Guardian of Lies (2009)
11. The Rule of Nine (2010)
12. Trader of Secrets (2011)
13. The Enemy Inside (2015)
14. Blood Flag (2016)

=== Stand Alone Novels ===
- The Simeon Chamber (1987)
- The List (1997)
- Critical Mass (1998)
