= McGeorge School of Law =

Private law school in Sacramento, California, US

Coordinates: 38.549167°N 121.472778°W

University of the Pacific McGeorge School of Law
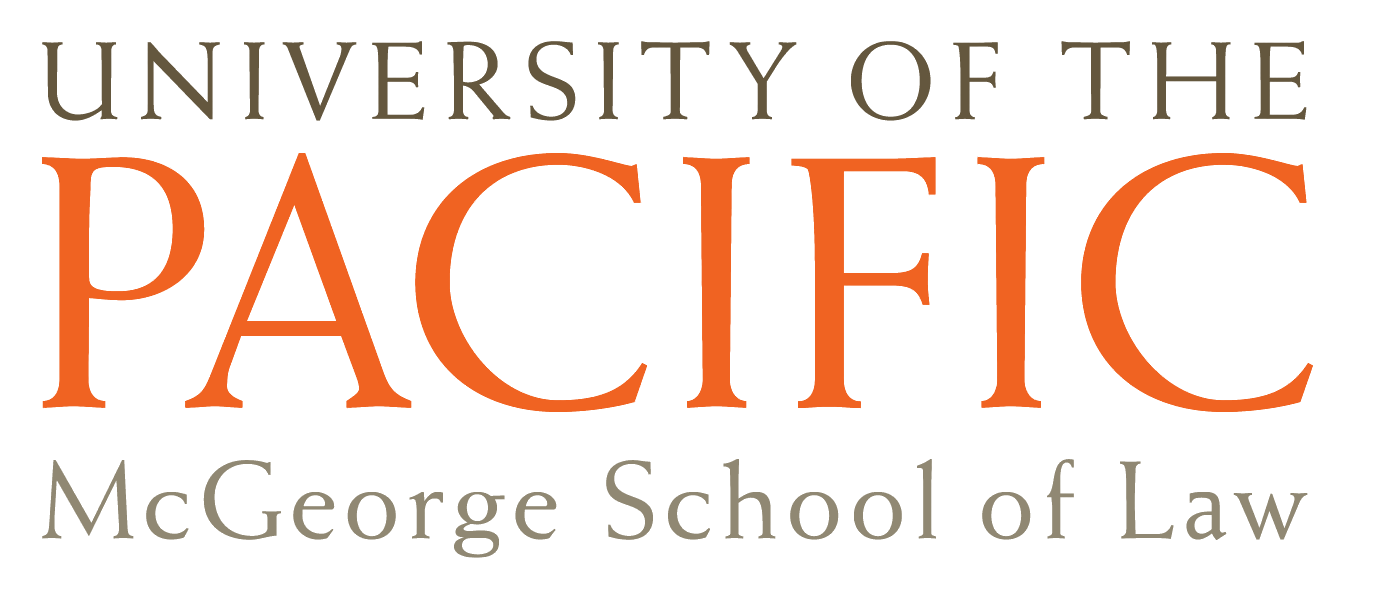
- Parent school: University of the Pacific
- Established: 1924; 102 years ago
- School type: Private
- Dean: Michael Colatrella
- Location: Sacramento, California, US
- Enrollment: 577 (Full and Part–time)
- Faculty: 36 (Full-time) 75 (Part–time)
- USNWR ranking: 163rd (tie) (2025)
- Bar pass rate: 70.7% (February 2025 California bar first time takers)
- Website: McGeorge School of Law
- ABA profile: McGeorge School of Law

University of the Pacific McGeorge School of Law is a private, American Bar Association (ABA)-approved law school in the Oak Park neighborhood of the city of Sacramento, California. It is part of the University of the Pacific and is located on the university's Sacramento campus.

Because of its location in California’s capital city, the law school has developed close ties with state government. California legislators, judges, and high-ranking government officials have taught as adjunct professors at the school, and many McGeorge alumni have served in leadership positions in state government.

== History ==
The school that eventually became McGeorge began in 1921 when University of Chicago Law School graduate and Standard Oil executive Verne Adrian McGeorge began teaching law students at night in downtown Sacramento, California. The school was formally established in 1924 as Sacramento College of Law and in 1929, was renamed McGeorge School of Law in honor of its founder.

Gordon D. Schaber served as dean from 1957 to 1991 and oversaw a period of major growth and transformation. In 1957, the school moved to its current campus in Sacramento’s Oak Park neighborhood. It received full accreditation from the State Bar of California in 1964, and merged with the University of the Pacific in 1966.

It received accreditation by the American Bar Association in 1969, followed by significant enrollment growth during the 1970s. McGeorge was one of the early U.S. law schools to establish study-abroad programs. Its first program was held in Vienna in 1975, and a summer program in Salzburg, Austria began in the mid-1980s. That program continues today. Former U.S. Supreme Court Associate Justice Anthony Kennedy taught in the Salzburg program for more than 30 years. In connection with the program, McGeorge offers summer externship opportunities in various international locations.

In 2021, alumnus Robert T. Eglet ‘88 and Tracy A. Eglet donated $25 million to the law school to create scholarships for first generation college students and support McGeorge’s Eglet Center for Trial Advocacy and Dispute Resolution.

== Accreditation, memberships, rankings ==
McGeorge has been approved by the American Bar Association (ABA) since 1969. As an ABA approved law school, McGeorge graduates are eligible to sit for the bar examination in any United States jurisdiction.

=== Memberships ===
McGeorge joined the Association of American Law Schools (AALS) in 1974 and is approved for participation in veterans’ educational benefits programs.

It has a chapter of the Order of the Coif, a national law school honorary society founded for the purposes of encouraging legal scholarship and advancing the ethical standards of the legal profession.

=== Rankings and bar exam passage rate ===
In the 2025 U.S. News & World Report law school rankings, McGeorge School of Law was ranked tied for 163rd out of 197 schools. In the May 2025 U.S. News & World Report, McGeorge ranked No. 9 for Trial Advocacy and No. 18 for Alternative Dispute Resolution.

In the PreLaw Magazine 2025 winter issue, McGeorge ranked No. 1 for government law, sharing the top spot with two other law schools — New York Law School and the University of Pennsylvania.

McGeorge received the 2025 LGBTQ+ Institutional Inclusive Excellence Award from the Association of American Law Schools Section on Sexual Orientation and Gender Identity Issues for its support of LGBTQ+ students.

Of the McGeorge alumni who took the California bar exam for the first time in February 2025, 70.7% passed.

== Admissions ==
For the class entering in 2024, the law school accepted 613 out of 1027 applicants (a 59.6% acceptance rate), with 212 of those accepted enrolling (a 33.8% yield rate – the percentage of accepted students who enrolled). Five students were not included in the acceptance statistics. The class consisted of 212 students. The median LSAT score was 155 and the median undergraduate GPA was 3.52. One student was not included in the GPA calculation. The reported 25th/75th percentile LSAT scores and GPAs were 152/158 and 3.14/3.77.

== Tuition ==
McGeorge's tuition and fees for full-time students during the 2025–2026 academic year are $62,678 per year, while tuition and fees for part-time students were $41,628.

== Academic programs ==
McGeorge offers degree programs leading to the award of the J.D. (Juris Doctor), the LL.M. (Master of Laws), the M.P.A. (Master of Public Administration), the M.P.P. (Master of Public Policy), the M.S.L. (Master of Science in Law) and the J.S.D. (Doctor of Juridical Science) degrees.

=== Concentrations ===
McGeorge offers several JD Certificate of Concentration programs designed to allow students to focus their legal studies in a specific area of practice.

==== Business law ====
The Business Certificate of Concentration emphasizes general business law and related practice areas, such as entertainment law, employment law, banking law, and real estate law.

==== Capital Lawyering ====
The Capital Lawyering Certificate of Concentration focuses on preparing students for careers in public policy, legislation, and government practice.

==== Elder and health law ====
The Elder & Health Law Certificate of Concentration is designed for students interested in health care law, elder law, or regulatory work. The program prepares students to represent both individuals and institutions or to serve in regulatory agencies.

==== Intellectual property law ====
The Intellectual Property Certificate of Concentration allows students to explore legal issues in patent, copyright, trademark, and related fields such as entertainment and artistry law.

==== International law ====
The International Certificate of Concentration emphasizes public international law and private international law.

==== Tax law ====
The Tax Certificate of Concentration offers coursework in federal and state tax law relevant to business, estate planning, and charitable organizations.

==== Trial and appellate advocacy ====
The Trial & Appellate Advocacy Certificate of Concentration provides training in criminal and civil trial preparation and advocacy, and alternatives to litigation.

==== Water and environmental law ====
The Water & Environmental Certificate of Concentration focuses on issues governed by environmental, energy, and water law on local, national, and international levels.

=== Clinics ===
McGeorge offers a range of legal clinics designed to provide students with experiential learning opportunities while delivering pro bono legal services to underserved populations. These clinics allow students to apply legal theory in real-world settings and develop practical lawyering skills under faculty supervision.

==== Bankruptcy Clinic ====
The Bankruptcy Clinic offers practical skills training in insolvency law. Students interview and counsel clients, assess cases, and may represent debtors in proceedings before the U.S. Bankruptcy Court.

==== Buccola Family Homeless Advocacy Clinic ====
The Buccola Family Homeless Advocacy Clinic provides legal services to unhoused individuals with criminal legal system contact. Students represent clients in civil, criminal, and administrative matters, gaining hands-on litigation experience.

==== Elder & Health Law Clinic ====
The Elder & Health Law Clinic provides students with practical experience in civil law involving elder care, health law, and related interdisciplinary issues, including probate, financial abuse, social security, and advance healthcare planning.

==== Federal Defender Clinic ====
The Federal Defender Clinic allows students to represent indigent clients in federal misdemeanor cases, draft legal memoranda, argue motions, and gain practical experience in client counseling, plea negotiation, and trial advocacy.

==== Immigration Law Clinic ====
The Immigration Law Clinic provides students with practical skills in client interviewing, legal issue resolution, and case planning while representing underserved non-citizens before the Department of Homeland Security and Immigration Court.

==== Legislative and Public Policy Clinic ====
The Legislative and Public Policy Clinic offers students practical experience in researching, drafting, and advocating for California state legislative and policy changes while engaging with government officials, lobbyists, and media.

==== Prisoner Civil Rights Mediation Clinic ====
The Prisoner Civil Rights Mediation Clinic offers students the chance to co-mediate Section 1983 prisoner civil rights cases with a federal magistrate judge in the Eastern District of California, developing mediation skills and legal knowledge.

=== Day and evening programs ===
McGeorge offers both a three-year day division program and four-year evening division program. Beginning in the 2025-26 academic year, McGeorge’s evening program is scheduled to be offered in a hybrid format, so students will need to be with students attending classes on campus two evenings per week during the first two years and having the option of a reduced on-campus presence in the final two years.

=== International Board of Advisors ===
McGeorge's International Board of Advisors is an advisory body that provides guidance and support to the law school’s faculty, administration, and students regarding educational programs and professional development in international law and transnational practice.

==== Prominent faculty working in international law ====
- Stephen McCaffrey is an expert in international water law. He received the 2018 Distinguished Elisabeth Haub Award Environmental Law and Diplomacy Laureate and 2017 Stockholm Water Prize Laureate.
- Omar Dajani is an expert on Palestinian-Israeli legal issues and an international law scholar. He is a co-director of the Global Center for Business and Development.
- Michael Malloy is an expert in bank regulation, economic sanctions, and international banking law.
- Frank Gevurtz is recognized as a leading commentator on corporate law; author of Corporation Law treatise.
- Michael Vitiello is an expert in criminal law, sentencing policy, and marijuana law. He has authored 13 books and more than 80 articles.
- Jarrod Wong is the co-director of the Global Center for Business and Development. He is a scholar in international dispute resolution.

== Location ==
The McGeorge School of Law is located on University of the Pacific's Sacramento campus at 3200 Fifth Avenue in the Oak Park area of Sacramento, the capital of California.

McGeorge is located on a 14-acre campus. The campus includes redwoods and a community garden maintained by student, staff, and faculty volunteers from McGeorge School of Law and the University of the Pacific's School of Health Sciences. Started in 2010 by Environmental Law Society students, the garden provides nutritious food, stress relief, hands-on learning experiences, and opportunities for campus community members to connect.

Students have access to an on-campus pool and gym. The gym, located next to the community garden, was recently revamped with brand-new gear, machines, and updated paint and flooring. These recreation facilities are available at no cost to students.

== Journals and publications ==
- The University of the Pacific Law Review (formerly titled "McGeorge Law Review" and "The Pacific Law Journal"). A student-run, scholarly journal publishing four issues annually. Two issues are published each year containing professional articles and student-authored comments or casenotes; one issue contains the Review of Selected California Legislation, or "Greensheets"; and one issue contains a symposium, focusing on a specific, significant legal topic.
- California Initiative Review. An online analysis of California ballot initiatives and related issues.
- California Water Law Journal. A forum for water law research.

== Notable people ==
=== Notable alumni ===
The McGeorge School of Law alumni network has over 15,000 members across all 50 US states and more than 81 countries worldwide.

- Greg Aghazarian '93 – California State Assemblyman, 26th District
- Mark Amodei '83 – U.S. Congressman from Nevada
- Emily Azevedo ‘19 – competed in bobsled at the 2010 Winter Olympics
- Ronald J. Bath '75 – USAF, Director of U.S. Air Force Strategic Planning
- Scott Baugh '87 – former California State Assembly Republican Leader, 67th District
- Scott Boras '87 – sports agent
- Consuelo María Callahan '75 – Judge, United States Court of Appeals for the Ninth Circuit
- L. Whitney Clayton '78 – Presidency of the Seventy of the Church of Jesus Christ of Latter-day Saints
- Lloyd Connelly '77 – Judge, Sacramento County Superior Court
- Ellen Corbett '81 – California State Senator, 10th District
- Christine Craft '95 – attorney, radio talk show host, and former television news anchor
- John Doolittle '78 – U.S. Congressman 1991–2009
- Morrison C. England Jr. '77, '83 – Judge, United States District Court for the Eastern District of California
- Noreen Evans '81 – California State Assemblywoman, 7th District
- Dayvid Figler '91 – Former Las Vegas Municipal Court Judge, NPR commentator
- Edward J. Garcia '58 – Judge, United States District Court for the Eastern District of California
- John M. Gerrard '81 – Justice of the Nebraska Supreme Court
- James Hardesty '75 - Justice of the Nevada Supreme Court
- Mikayil Jabbarov '98 – Minister of Economy of the Azerbaijan Republic
- Michael A. Lilly '74 – Attorney General of Hawaii (1984–1985)
- Bill Lockyer '86 – California State Treasurer and former California Attorney General
- Steve Martini '74 – attorney and best-selling author of legal thriller novels
- Deborah Ortiz '87 – former California State Senator, 6th District
- Johnnie B. Rawlinson '79 – Judge, United States Court of Appeals for the Ninth Circuit
- Dana Makoto Sabraw '85 – Judge, United States District Court for the Southern District of California
- Robert J. Sandoval '76 – first openly gay judge on Los Angeles County Superior Court
- Steven D. Strauss '92 – author, columnist, and lawyer
- Ned B. Pillersdorf '80 -- criminal defense attorney; pro bono counsel for former clients of Eric C. Conn

=== Present Dean and Dean Emeriti ===
- Michael T. Colatrella Jr., 2025 - Present
- Michael Hunter Schwartz, 2017 – 2025
- Francis J. –"Jay" Mootz, 2012–2017
- Elizabeth Rindskopf Parker, 2002–2012
- Gerald Caplan, 1991–2002
- Gordon D. Schaber, 1957–1991
- John Swann, 1946–1957
- Lawrence Dowrety, 1937 – WWII closure
- Gilford Rowland, 1933–1937
- Russell Harris, 1930–1933
- Vern Adrian McGeorge, Founder, 1924–1930
