= Lars Loe =

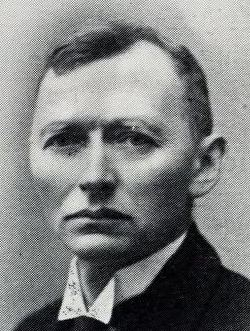
surveyor

Lars Gunerius Loe (18 April 1883 – 8 January 1971) was a Norwegian surveyor and rector.

He was born in Ulstein Municipality as a smallholders' son. In 1914 he married a priest's daughter.

After graduating from the Norwegian College of Agriculture in 1906 he was a research fellow from 1906 to 1908, docent from 1913 and professor of land surveying from 1919. From 1934 to 1945 he served as the Norwegian College of Agriculture rector, interrupted by the Nazi-installed Michael Marius Langballe during 1942–45. During his hiatus during the occupation of Norway by Nazi Germany, Loe was also incarcerated in Bredtveit concentration camp from 24 March to the war's end.

He died in 1971.

Academic offices
Preceded by Agnar Johannes Barth	Rector of the Norwegian College of Agriculture; 1934–1942	Succeeded by Michael Marius Langballe (Nazi collaborator)
Preceded by Michael Marius Langballe (Nazi collaborator)	Rector of the Norwegian College of Agriculture; 1945–1946	Succeeded by Rasmus Mork
