= Robert J. Sandoval =

American judge (1950–2006)

Judge of the Los Angeles County Superior Court
- In office 2001–2006
- Appointed by: Gray Davis
- Preceded by: Bruce Joseph Sottile
- Succeeded by: Richard M. Goul

Personal details
- Born: February 23, 1950
- Died: February 28, 2006 (aged 56) Duarte, California, U.S.
- Domestic partner: Bill Martin
- Education: California State University, Los Angeles (BA); McGeorge School of Law (JD)

Robert J. Sandoval (February 23, 1950 – February 28, 2006) was a judge of the Los Angeles County Superior Court.

== Early life ==
Sandoval was born on February 23, 1950. He graduated from San Gabriel High School and then received a Bachelor of Arts degree in political science from California State University, Los Angeles in 1972. He then attended the McGeorge School of Law and earned his Juris Doctor in 1976.

== Career ==
From 1984 to 1997, Sandoval served as a Los Angeles Municipal Court commissioner. In 1997, he was selected to serve as a Los Angeles County Superior Court commissioner. While a Superior Court commissioner, Sandoval presided over the high-profile lewd contact case against Hugh Grant in 1995. On July 11, 1995, Sandoval sentenced Grant to two years probation and fined him $1,180.

Sandoval was appointed to the Los Angeles County Superior Court by Governor Gray Davis in 2001. Sandoval was the first openly gay judge appointed by Davis and believed to be the first openly gay judge appointed in California in 20 years. Sandoval served until his death in 2006.

== Personal life ==
Sandoval and his long-time partner, Bill Martin, adopted a son in 1992, making them one of the first gay male couples in Los Angeles County to adopt a child. The couple named their son Harrison Martin-Sandoval, combining their last names to symbolize their familial unity.

Sandoval died in 2006. After his death, his alma mater McGeorge School of Law honored his contributions by placing him on the Wall of Honor.

== See also ==
- List of Hispanic and Latino American jurists
- List of LGBT jurists in the United States
