= Edgar Varela (baseball) =

American baseball player and coach

- Hitting coach
- Born: August 9, 1980 (age 46); Los Angeles, California
- Bats: Left Throws: Right

Teams
- As coach: Minnesota Twins (2020–2021)

Edgar Jose Varela (born August 9, 1980) is an American professional baseball coach. He was the hitting coach for the Minnesota Twins of Major League Baseball (MLB) from 2020 to 2021.

== Career ==
Varela attended San Gabriel High School in San Gabriel, California. He was drafted by the Detroit Tigers in the 38th round of the 1998 MLB draft, but did not sign and attended Los Angeles City College and California State University, Long Beach. He was drafted by the Chicago White Sox in the 31st round of the 2002 MLB draft.

Varela played in the White Sox, Arizona Diamondbacks, and Florida Marlins organizations from 2002 through 2006. Varela joined the Pittsburgh Pirates organization in 2008. He served as a coach for the GCL Pirates (2008), West Virginia Power (2009, 2010, and 2012), State College Spikes (2011), and Bradenton Marauders (2013). He served as the manager of the Bristol Pirates from 2014 through 2016. He then served as the Pirates Latin American hitting coordinator in 2017.

Varela was hired by the Minnesota Twins as their minor league field coordinator, spending the 2018 and 2019 seasons in that role.

On November 25, 2019, Varela was named the hitting coach for the Twins. On October 6, 2021, Varela was reassigned to a minor league role and removed from the major league staff.
