= John Andrews (baseball) =

American baseball player (born 1949)

- Pitcher
- Born: February 9, 1949 (age 77); Monterey Park, California, U.S.
- Batted: Left Threw: Left

MLB debut
- April 8, 1973, for the St. Louis Cardinals

Last MLB appearance
- September 19, 1973, for the St. Louis Cardinals

MLB statistics
- Win–loss record: 1–1
- Earned run average: 4.42
- Strikeouts: 5
- Stats at Baseball Reference

Teams
- St. Louis Cardinals (1973)

John Richard Andrews (born February 9, 1949) is an American former professional baseball player whose career spanned six season, including a part of one in Major League Baseball with the St. Louis Cardinals in 1973. Andrews, a pitcher, compiled a major league record of 1–1 with a 4.42 earned run average (ERA) and five strikeouts in 16 games, all in relief. He attended San Gabriel High School, San Gabriel, California, where he was drafted three times, while never signing. For college, Andrews attended San Diego State University. In 1971, Andrews signed with the Cardinals as an amateur free agent. Over his professional career, Andrews also played in the minor leagues with the Class-A Short Season Lewiston Broncs, the Class-A Modesto Reds, the Triple-A Tulsa Oilers, the Double-A Arkansas Travelers, the Double-A Jackson Mets and the Triple-A Tidewater Tides. In the minors, Andrews compiled a record of 39–23 with a 3.66 ERA in 170 games, 48 starts. He batted and threw left-handed.

== Amateur career ==
During the fifth round of the 1968 Major League Baseball draft, Andrews was selected by the New York Yankees, but did not sign. Andrews was drafted twice in the 1969 Major League Baseball draft. First in the fifth round of the regular phase by the California Angels and later in the seventh round of the secondary phase by the New York Mets. Both times, Andrews did not sign. He went on to attend San Diego State University for one year in 1970 where he was 8-3

== Professional career ==
=== St. Louis Cardinals ===
In 1971, Andrews signed with the St. Louis Cardinals as an amateur free agent. He made his professional baseball debut that season in the minor leagues with the Class-A Short Season Lewiston Broncs of the Northwest League. During his time with the Broncs, Andrews went 2–1 with a 1.73 earned run average (ERA) in four games, three starts. Later that season, Andrews received a promotion to the Class A Modesto Reds of the California League. In 22 games with the Reds, Andrews went 3–0 with a 2.85 ERA. During the 1972 season, Andrews spent the entire year with Modesto Reds. He went 8–5 with a 3.02 ERA in 45 games, all in relief that season.

Andrews made the St. Louis Cardinals' roster out of spring training in 1973. He made his debut in Major League Baseball on April 8, pitching 1 1/3 innings in relief, giving-up no runs against the Pittsburgh Pirates. On April 15, in a game against the Chicago Cubs, Andrews picked up his first loss. Andrews was sent down to the minor leagues on April 26, after pitching seven games in the majors. In the minors, Andrews played for the Triple-A Tulsa Oilers and the Double-A Arkansas Travelers. Between the two teams, he went 11–2 with a 3.00 ERA in 26 games, 16 starts. During the season, Andrews made two returns to the majors. First in June and later in August. Andrews pitched his first win on September 3, in a game against the Pittsburgh Pirates. During his time in the majors that season, Andrews went 1–1 with a 4.42 ERA and five strikeouts in 16 games, all in relief.

=== Later career ===
Andrews was traded from the Cardinals to the California Angels for Jeff Torborg at the Winter Meetings on December 6, 1973. During the 1974 season, the Angels assigned Andrews to the Double-A El Paso Diablos in their minor league organization. With the Diablos, Andrews went 9–9 with a 5.33 ERA in 23 games, 20 starts. In 1975, Andrews did not play in professional baseball. He made his return in 1976 in the New York Mets organization. With the Double-A Jackson Mets that season, Andrews went 6–4 with a 2.57 ERA and 36 strikeouts in 42 games, all in relief. Amongst Texas League pitchers, Andrews was seventh in ERA. Andrews spent the 1977 season with the Triple-A Tidewater Tides, going 0–2 with a 6.48 ERA in eight games, seven starts.
