= Marie Wasem =

German politician (born 1995)

Member of the Landtag of Rhineland-Palatinate
- Incumbent
- Assumed office 1 October 2025
- Preceded by: Thomas Barth

Personal details
- Born: 22 February 1995 (age 31) Wiesbaden
- Party: Christian Democratic Union (since 2020)

Marie Wasem (born 22 February 1995) is a German politician serving as a member of the Landtag of Rhineland-Palatinate since 2025. She has been a city councillor of Ingelheim am Rhein and a district councillor of Mainz-Bingen since 2024.
