= Candy Johnson =

American dancer (1944–2012)

- Johnson in Muscle Beach Party (1964)
- Born: Vicki Jane Husted; February 8, 1944; Los Angeles, California, U.S.
- Died: October 20, 2012 (aged 68)
- Other names: Candy Johnston
- Occupation: Dancer
- Years active: 1962–1966
- Known for: Dancing in the Beach Party films
- Spouse: Norton Gilson (divorced)

Candy Johnson (born Vicki Jane Husted; February 8, 1944 – October 20, 2012) was an American go-go dancer who appeared in several teen-oriented films in the 1960s.

== Early life ==
Johnson was born Vicki Jane Husted in Los Angeles. She was the stepdaughter of Carl Willis Johnston, one of the developers of IMAX. Johnson grew up in San Gabriel, California, where she graduated from San Gabriel High School. Under the tutelage of her mother, Jeanne Rathmann Johnston, who was also a dancer, Johnson took tap dance lessons from the age of five, and made her television debut at the age of six.

== Career ==
After high school, Johnson worked as a long-distance telephone operator and began dancing the twist in local clubs. She was discovered by talent manager (and future husband) Norton "Red" Gilson, who paired her with a rock group, the Exciters. The act debuted in October 1962 at the Safari Lounge and Mirador Hotel in Palm Springs, California. Johnson's frenetic, high-speed twisting earned her the nickname "Miss Perpetual Motion," and the act became a hit in Los Angeles, Las Vegas, and Phoenix. Her publicity material claimed that her dancing was so physically taxing that she lost four to five pounds a night, required 11 hours of sleep and five meals per day, and wore out $1,200 (equivalent to $12,600 in 2025) worth of nylon stockings per year, which she deducted from her taxes as a business expense.

The success of Johnson's club act led to appearances in four beach party films produced by American International Pictures: Beach Party (1963), Muscle Beach Party (1964), Bikini Beach (1964), and Pajama Party (1964). In each film, her dancing was portrayed as so intense that her gyrations could literally knock men off their feet from a distance.

Johnson also released two albums with the Exciters, which featured her singing: Ray Ryan Presents the Candy Johnson Show (1963) and The Candy Johnson Show at Bikini Beach (1964), both on her own Canjo Records label. She also performed at the Gay New Orleans Club at both seasons of the New York World's Fair in 1964 and 1965. Covering the fair, Newsday wrote: "Her dance, consisting of gyrations that a generation ago would have been called the shimmy, benefits from the fringe on her dress as she hops from stage to dance floor to table tops." By 1966, Johnson was performing at her own short-lived nightclub on West 56th Street in New York, the Candy Store, where she was billed as a "frug queen," but by the end of the decade, her career had wound down and she was no longer in the public eye.

== Death ==
Johnson died on October 20, 2012. Her cremated remains, along with those of her sister Gayle, were sent to outer space in 2013 by the Houston-based space burial firm Celestis.
