= René Barth =

Swiss handball player (born 1963)

Personal information
- Nationality: Swiss
- Born: 5 September 1963 (age 62)

Sport
- Sport: Handball

René Barth (born 5 September 1963) is a Swiss handball player. He competed at the 1984 Summer Olympics and the 1996 Summer Olympics.
