= Carl Georg Barth =

Norwegian-American mathematician (1860–1939)

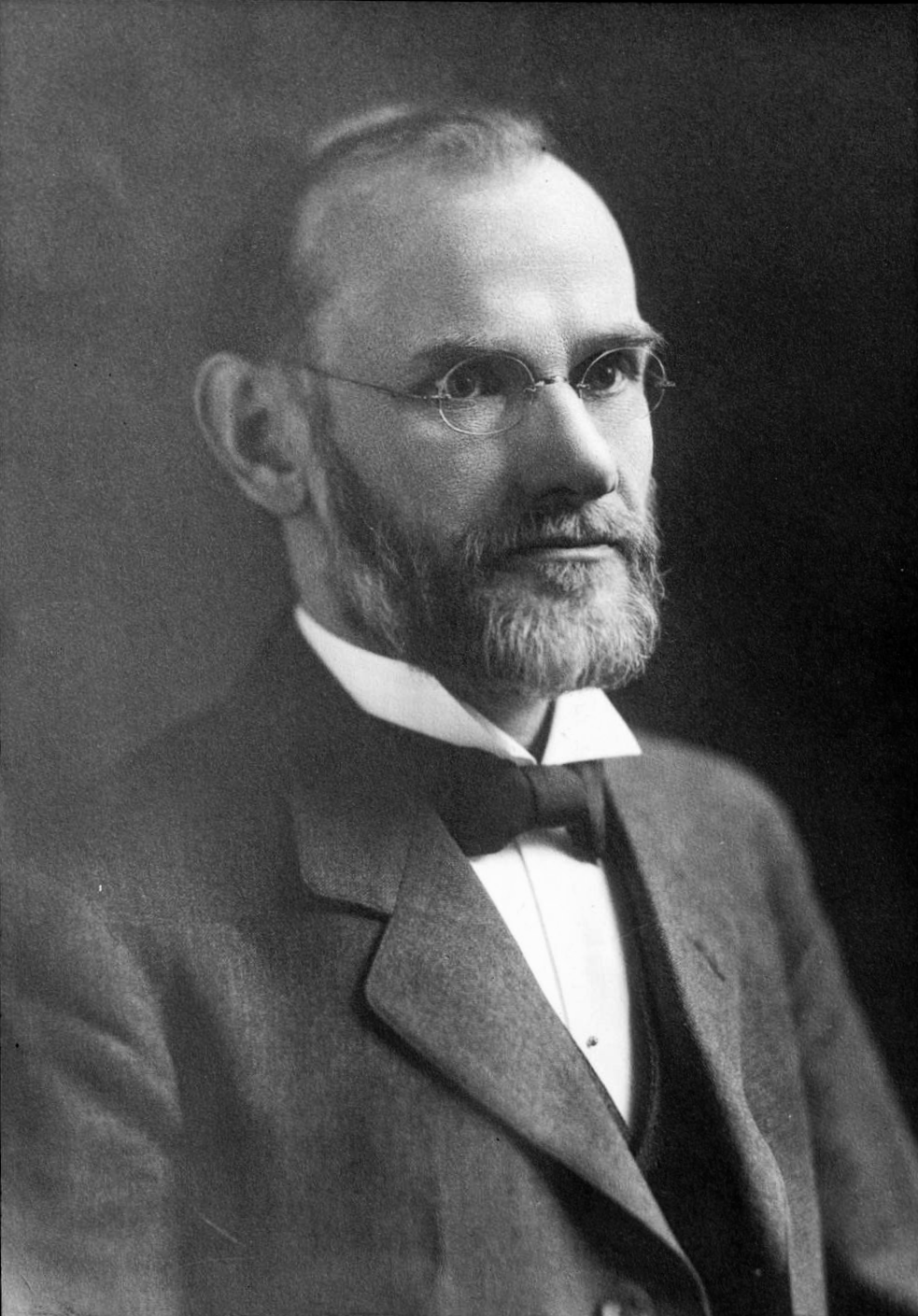
Carl G. Barth

Carl Georg Lange Barth (February 28, 1860 – October 28, 1939) was a Norwegian-American mathematician, mechanical and consulting engineer, and lecturer at Harvard University. Barth is known as one of the foreman of scientific management, who improved and popularized the industrial use of compound slide rules.

== Biography ==
=== Youth and education ===
Carl Georg Barth was born in Christiania, Norway (now Oslo). He was the fourth child of Jakob Boeckman Barth (1822–1892), a lawyer and Adelaide Magdeline Lange Barth (1828- 1897), daughter of a Danish clergyman. Agnar Johannes Barth was his brother. He received his early education in the public schools at Lillehammer.

He was a graduate from University at Christiania. He later attended the Royal Norwegian Navy technical school at Horten. In 1877, Barth started an apprenticeship in the navy yard at Karljohansvern in Horten.

=== Career ===
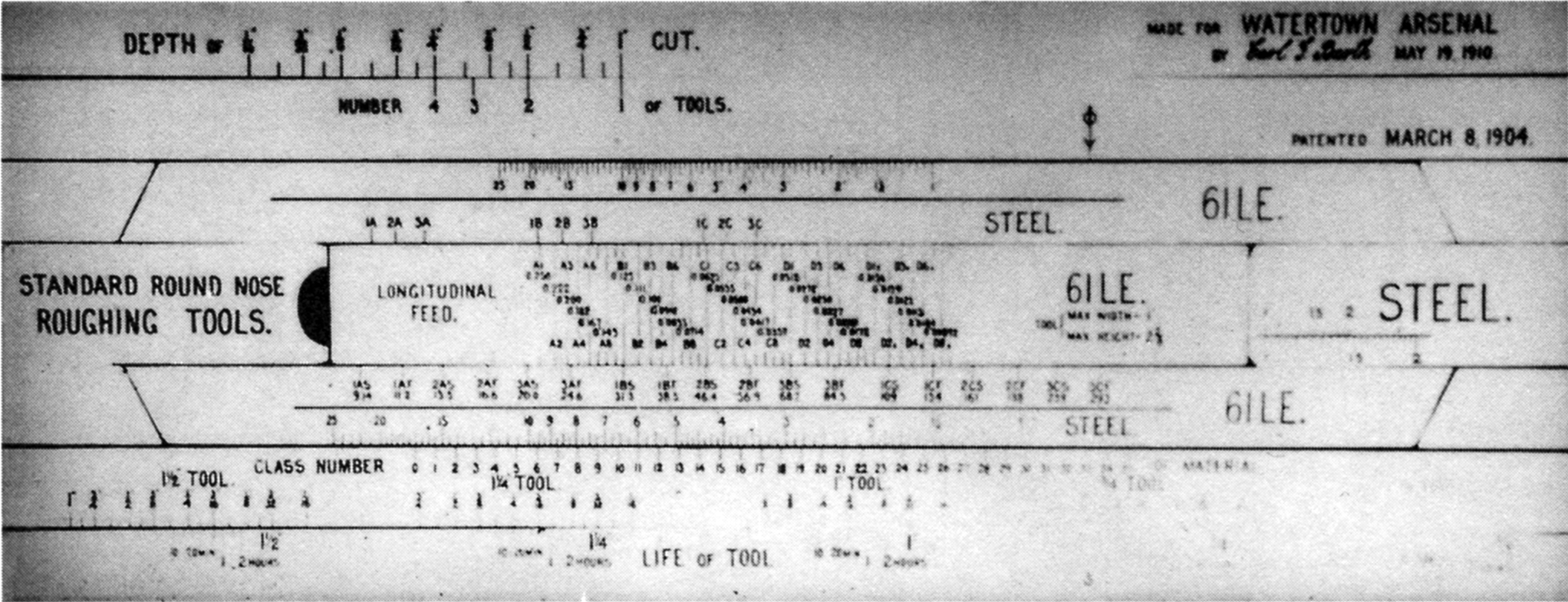
One of Carl G. Barth's speed-and-feed slide rules

In 1899, efficiency expert Frederick W. Taylor hired Barth to work with him at Bethlehem Steel Company. Carl Barth helped to develop speed-and-feed-calculating slide rules.

Carl G. Barth... discovered the law governing the tiring effect of heavy labor... such work consists of a heavy pull or a push on the man's arms... For example, when pig iron is being handled (each pig weighing 92 pounds), a first-class workman can only be under load 43 per cent. of the day... if the workman is handling a half-pig weighing 46 pounds, he can then be under load 58 per cent. of the day... As the weight grows lighter... a load is reached which he can carry in his hands all day long without being tired out.

In 1902, Taylor and Barth went to work for William Sellers at the machine tool firm of William Sellers & Company of Philadelphia. An account of their application of slide rules was published in the Transactions of the American Society of Mechanical Engineers in 1904.

Barth started in 1905 on his independent career as consulting engineer. Barth became an early consultant on scientific management and later taught at Harvard University. Barth edited articles submitted to International Correspondence School of Scranton, Pennsylvania publication, the Home Study Magazine. In 1909, he undertook the installation of scientific management in the Watertown Arsenal at Watertown, Massachusetts.

Barth was a leftist and anticapitalist.

=== Family ===
In March 1882, Barth married Henrike Jakobine Fredriksen (1857–1916). They were the parents of a daughter and two sons. After his first wife's death, he married Sophia Eugenia Roever (1873–1958).

=== Later years ===
In his later years, Barth worked on developing an improved method of instruction for calculus. However, poor health prevented him from publishing his work. He died of a heart attack at his home in Philadelphia in 1939.

== Selected publications ==
- Barth, Carl G. "Report on Fixing of Rates for Loading Pig Iron by Half Pigs on Buggies in the Yards." South Bethlehem, Pa (1900): 82–84.
- Carl Barth. Slide Rules for the Machine Shop as a Part of the Taylor System of Management. ASME, 1903.
- Barth, C. G. "The Transmission of Power by Leather Belting." Transactions of the American Society of Mechanical Engineers 31 (1909).
- Barth, Carl G. "Testimony of Carl G. Barth." Hearings of the US Commissions on Industrial Relations, 64th Congress, 1st. 1914.
- Barth, Carl G. "Standardization of Machine Tools." Transactions, ASME Vol 38, 1916: 895–922.
- Barth, Carl G. Labor turnover: A mathematical discussion. Carl G. Barth & Son, 1919.
- Barth, C. G. "New Graphical Solution for Time Allowances in Task Setting." Management and Administration: 1943–44.

Patent

- Barth, Carl G., Henry L. Gantt, and Frederick W. Taylor. "Slide-rule." U.S. Patent No. 753,840. 8 Mar. 1904.
- Barth, Carl G. "Method and means for re-forming wheels having worn treads and flanges." U.S. Patent No. 1,510,819. 7 Oct. 1924.

Charts

- Barth, C. G. "Carl," Diagram of Functionalized Routing."." Chart 180.

== Archives and records ==
- Papers of Carl G. Barth and his son J. Christian Barth at Baker Library Special Collections, Harvard Business School.
