= Erwin Barth =

German architect (1880–1933)

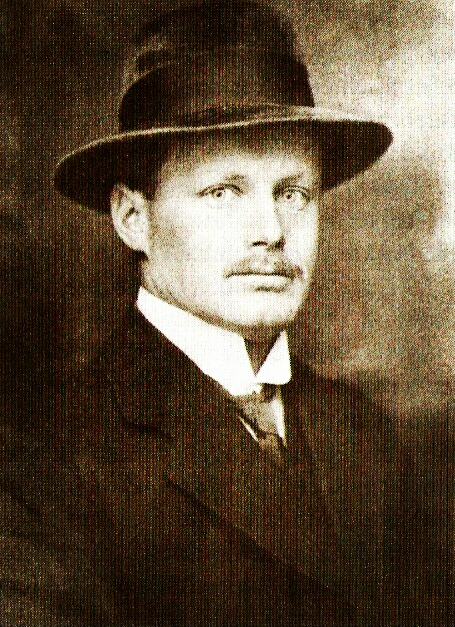
- Born: 28 November 1880; Lübeck, Germany
- Died: 10 July 1933 (aged 52); Berlin, Germany
- Occupation: Architect

Erwin Barth (28 November 1880 – 10 July 1933) was a German landscape gardener and architect. His work was part of the architecture event in the art competition at the 1928 Summer Olympics.

== Biography ==
Barth was born to Albert Barth and Luise in Lübeck. A year after the birth of his sister Frieda in 1882, his father died from tuberculosis. Primary school at the Realgymnasium gave him an interest in nature studies, and he began to collect plants and other natural history objects. He wanted to find an education that would allow him to work and earn for the family, so he decided to train as a garden architect at the Royal Gardening College near Potsdam which did not require an Abitur (degree) but required a two-year apprenticeship for which he joined the commercial gardening company of Philipp Paulig in Lübeck in 1897-1899 and then at J. Timm and Co. in Elmshorn. He was influenced by Theodor Echtermeyer and Fritz Encke and passed with distinction in 1902. He then worked at various locations including Hanover under Julius Trip. In 1906 he passed the head gardener examination and was in charge of the Vorwerker cemetery in the St. Lorenz-Nord district and the green area on Marlistraße in the St. Gertrud district. In 1908 he became city gardener in Lübeck. He married Elisabeth Frenkel of Göttingen in 1910 Barth and they had a son and a daughter.
