= Elizabeth Bath =

English poet (1776–1844)

- Born: Elizabeth Paddy; 17 February 1776
- Died: 3 October 1844 (aged 68)
- Spouse: Henry Bath
- Relatives: sister of Mary Osler (née Paddy) great aunt of William Osler
- Writing career
- Period: Romantic period
- Notable works: Poems, on Various Occasions (1806)

Elizabeth Bath, née Paddy, (1776–1844) was an English poet. She was the author of a collection of sixty-six poems published by subscription in 1806 in Bristol and a member of the Society of Friends.

== Biography ==
Elizabeth Paddy was born on 17 February 1776. She was the daughter of Edward Paddy and Mary (Rowling) of Falmouth, Cornwall.

On 7 November 1796, she married Henry Bath (24 January 1776 – 29 May 1844), a Quaker who was a metals merchant in Swansea, South Wales, and also the founder of Henry Bath & Son Ltd., an enterprise still in existence. They lived at Rosehill House, in Mumbles, Swansea. Elizabeth's sister, Mary, became the wife of Edward Osler and thereby the grandmother of Sir William Osler, the physician.

In 1806, she published, Poems, on Various Occasions (Bristol: Printed by J. Desmond, at the Mirror-Office, Small-Street). The collection is dedicated to a friend "whose sincerity is equaled only by the stability which has ever marked her character." The poems take a variety of forms — some are sonnets; some are longer poems — and they address religion, loss, friendship, sensibility, and other likely topics. The list of subscribers is substantial.

Bath died on 3 October 1844.

== Selected works ==
- Poems, on Various Occasions. Bristol: Printed by J. Desmond, at the Mirror-Office, Small-Street. 1806.
