= Agnar Johannes Barth =

Norwegian forester (1871–1948)

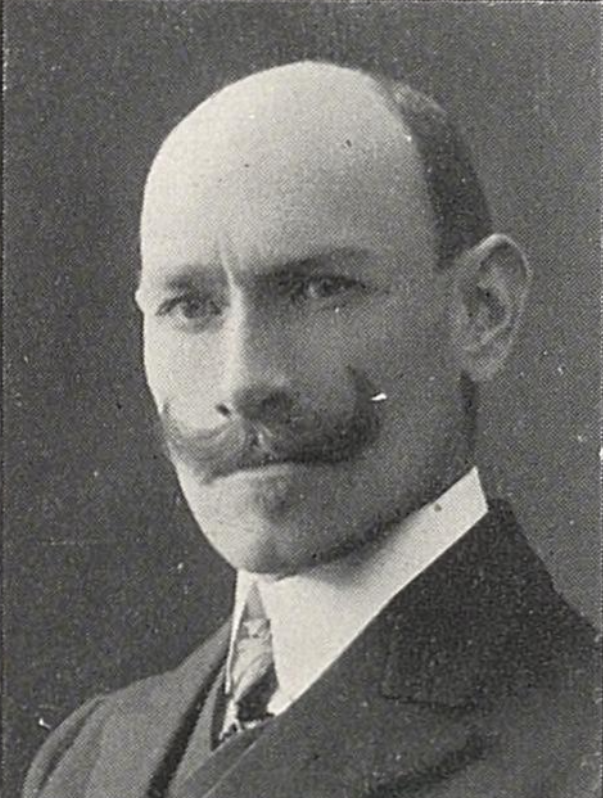
Agnar Johannes Barth

Agnar Johannes Barth (26 August 1871 – 4 May 1948) was a Norwegian forester.

He was born in Lillehammer as the son of Jacob Bøckmann Barth. Carl G. Barth was his brother. Described as his "country's leading authority on forestry for many years", he was a professor at the Norwegian College of Agriculture from 1921, and served as rector (roughly, the president) there from 1928 to 1933.

Barth was a reserve officer in the Norwegian Army, attaining the rank of Second Lieutenant in 1891. In one of his first immatriculation speeches, in 1929, he praised the youth in general, and especially the youth who "has created Mussolini's Italy while struggling against corrupted radicalism and communism; an Italian country, which from an essentially impoverished state, standing on the brink of cultural and material collapse, in the course of a few years have been brought fourth to a blossoming state, where the entire people, united and purposeful, with incredible intensity labour for the country's progress".

Academic offices
| Preceded by Sigvald Hasund | Rector of the Norwegian College of Agriculture; 1928–1933 | Succeeded by Lars Loe |
