= Christian Frederik Barth =

Danish oboist and composer (1787–1861)

Christian Frederik Barth (24 February 1787 – 17 July 1861) was a Danish virtuoso oboist and composer.

Barth was an oboist in the Royal Chapel from 1802 to 1841. He was the son of oboist Christian Samuel Barth and brother of oboist and composer Frederik Philip Carl August Barth. He composed Sonate Brilliant for Oboe and Piano which is made up of three movements: Allegro, Adagio sostenuto, and a scherzando.
