= Matthew Barth =

American electrical engineer

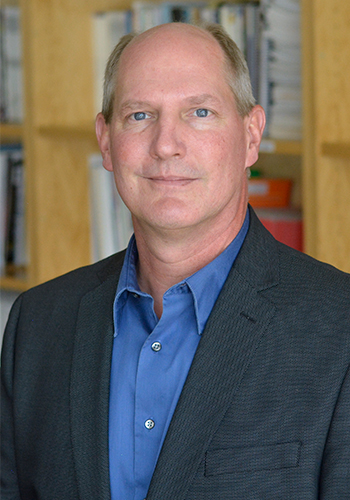
- Citizenship: United States
- Education: University of Colorado Boulder; University of California, Santa Barbara
- Scientific career
- Fields: Intelligent transportation systems Intelligent vehicle technologies Air quality
- Workplaces: University of California, Riverside

Matthew Barth is a distinguished professor of Electrical and Computer Engineering and associate dean for research and graduate education at the Bourns College of Engineering at the University of California, Riverside. He was named Fellow of the Institute of Electrical and Electronics Engineers (IEEE) in 2014 for his research in intelligent transportation systems.

== Career ==
Barth received his B.S. degree in Electrical Engineering/Computer Science from the University of Colorado in 1984, and his M.S. and Ph.D. degrees in Electrical and Computer Engineering from the University of California, Santa Barbara in 1985 and 1990, respectively. From 1985 to 1986, he was a member of the technical staff in the Advanced Technologies Division of General Research Corporation, Santa Barbara. From 1986 to 1987 Barth conducted research at the University of Tokyo as a visiting research student. Upon completion of his Ph.D., Barth was a visiting researcher at Osaka University, Japan, conducting research in systems engineering from 1989 to 1991.

Barth joined the University of California, Riverside in 1991, where he has been conducting research in Electrical and Computer Engineering Department as the Esther and Daniel Hays Distinguished Professor, and at UCR's Center for Environmental Research and Technology (CE-CERT) as Director from 2007 - 2022. Additionally, he serves on the board of advisors of Institute of Transportation Studies, University of California, Davis (ITS-Davis), the board of advisors of the Center for Advancing Research in Transportation Emissions, Energy, and Health (CARTEEH), and as an Affiliated Faculty of California Partners for Advanced Transportation Technology (PATH), University of California, Berkeley.

== Society activities ==
Barth has been active in the U.S. Transportation Research Board (TRB), serving on the Transportation and Air Quality Committee and the Intelligent Transportation Systems Committee. In 2007, he was awarded the TRB Pyke Johnson Award for TRB outstanding paper. He was one of the winners of the Connected Vehicle Technology Challenge sponsored by U.S. Department of Transportation’s Research and Innovative Technology Administration (RITA) in 2011. Barth has also served on a number of National Research Council (NRC) committees.

Barth has also been active within IEEE Intelligent Transportation System Society (ITSS) for many years, participating in their conferences as a presenter, invited session organizer, session moderator, program chair, associate editor, senior editor, and member of the IEEE ITSS Board of Governors. He was the IEEE ITSS Vice President for Conferences from 2011 to 2012, the President-Elect for 2013, the President for 2014–2015, the Past President for 2016, Vice President of Finances for 2017–2020, and Vice President of Education from 2021-2024.
