= Jacob Bøckmann Barth =

Norwegian forester (1822–1892)

Jacob Bøckmann Barth (11 March 1822 – 27 March 1892 in Lillehammer) was a Norwegian forester.

Barth was born in Kristiansand to second lieutenant Nicolai Bøckmann Barth (1797–1846) and Elisabeth Charlotte Bruun (1796–1873). In 1855, he married Adelaide Magdalene Lange (1828–97), daughter of priest Carl Georg Lange (1778–1850) and Inger Sye. He had at least two sons, among them the forester Agnar Johannes Barth (1871–1948) as well as Hans Rasch Barth.

Graduating as cand.jur. (master's in law) in 1846, he received a government grant in 1852 for education in forestry. He traveled around the country between 1855 and 1860, providing the grounds to establish a national forestry authority. This was established in 1860, and Barth became district chief in Kristians Amt.

== Bibliography ==
He published several books.

- Indberetning om en i Lofoten og Vesteraalen foretagen zoologisk Reise, særtrykk av Nyt Magasin for Naturvidenskaberne, 1853
- Den norske Natur, skildret i Billeder fra Jagtlivet, 1856
- Om Almindingsskovene. Indberetning til Departementet for det Indre, 1857
- Om Skovene i deres Forhold til Nationaloeconomien, 1857
- Om Skovforholdene i Finmarken, 1858
- Om Skovforholdene i Gulbrandsdalen, 1858
- Veiledning i det Vigtigste af den norske Skovhuusholdning, 1864
- Optegnelser fra mit Jægerliv, 1865
- Skovsagen. Dens Udvikling, nærværende Stilling og Fremtid, 1871
- Erindringer fra Jagten paa det mindre Vildt i Norge, 1874
- Naturskildringer og Optegnelser fra mit Jæger- og Reiseliv, 1877
- Norges Fuglevildt og Jagten paa samme, København 1881
- Nogle Træk af Harmonien i Naturen, 1886
- Præstelærens Usandhed og den sande Kristendom, 1889
