= Frederik Philip Carl August Barth =

German-Danish oboist and composer (1775–1804)

Frederik Philip Carl August Barth (1775 – December 22, 1804) was a German-Danish virtuoso oboist and composer.

He was son of oboist Christian Samuel Barth and brother of oboist and composer Christian Frederik Barth.

Born in Kassel, Barth was trained by his father and played solo at a concert at the Royal Theater as a 14-year-old in 1789 and joined the chapel in 1793. He and his father directed in the years 1794-97 concerts in the Holstein Dramatic Society, which included various compositions by him.
