= Thomas Barth (politician) =

German politician (born 1977)

Member of the Landtag of Rhineland-Palatinate
- In office 1 October 2017 – 30 September 2025
- Preceded by: Dorothea Schäfer
- Succeeded by: Marie Wasem

Personal details
- Born: 8 May 1977 (age 49)
- Party: Christian Democratic Union (since 1995)

Thomas Barth (born 8 May 1977) is a German politician serving as Landrat of Mainz-Bingen since 2025. From 2017 to 2025, he was a member of the Landtag of Rhineland-Palatinate. From 2014 to 2025, he served as mayor of Stadecken-Elsheim.
