= P. Austin Nuttall =

English editor and classicist

Peter Austin Nuttall (1792 or 1793 – 9 December 1869) was an English editor and classicist best known for dictionaries. He was born in Ormskirk, Lancashire and moved to London after completing his studies, gaining a doctorate from Aberdeen University in 1822. He was a contributor and possibly an editor of The Gentleman's Magazine between 1820 and 1837. From 1825 his editions of Latin authors were published. In 1839 he became a partner in a printing business, producing classics, educational reference books, anti-Catholic apologetics, and revised editions of older dictionaries such as Walker's and Johnson's. In 1840 he petitioned Parliament against the Copyright Bill. In 1863 Nuttall's Standard Pronouncing Dictionary of the English Language was published. Nuttall died bankrupt and was survived by five children; his wife and at least three children predeceased him. Subsequently, Frederick Warne & Co published further dictionaries under his name as late as 1973, and The Nuttall Encyclopædia in 1900 (revised up to 1956).

== Bibliography ==
Literary editions

- Burns, Robert (1866). Willmott, Robert Aris (ed.). The poetical works of Robert Burns. Preface by P. Austin Nuttall. London. OCLC 793720328.
- Fuller, Thomas (1840). Nuttall, P. Austin (ed.). History of the worthies of England. Vol. 3 vols. London: Thomas Tegg. OCLC 565629625.
- Horace (1827–30). Nuttall, P. Austin (ed.). Q. Horatii Flacci opera : with an ordo and verbal translation. Vol. 4 vols. Translated by John Stirling. London: Printed for T. Ward. OCLC 8301987.
- Juvenal (1825). Nuttall, P. Austin (ed.). D. Junii Juvenalis Satirae. Translated by John Stirling. London: T. Ward. OCLC 37832031.
- Juvenal (1836). Nuttall, P. Austin (ed.). D. Junii Juvenalis Satirae. Linear translation by John Stirling; verse translation by William Gifford (Revised ed.). London: Printed for the editor by Nichols & Son. OCLC 937025568.
- Virgil (1826). P. Virgilii Maronis Bucolica; containing an ordo and interlineal translation accompanying the text; a treatise on Latin versification and references to a scanning table. Translated by Nuttall, P. Austin. OCLC 950774565.

Reference works

- Craig, John, ed. (1864). Universal English dictionary, comprising the etymology, definition, and pronunciation of all known words in the language, as well as technical terms used in art, science, literature, commerce, and law. Supplement of new words by P.A. Nuttall. London: Routledge. OCLC 7047919.
- Gawthrop, Hugh (1859). Nuttall, P. Austin (ed.). Arithmetical and geographical tables (8th ed.). London: Routledge, Warne, & Routledge. OCLC 890145546.
- Lloyd, Llewelyn (1867). The Game birds and wild fowl of Sweden and Norway. Latin index of scientific names by P. A. Nuttall. F. Warne & Company. pp. 595–599.
- Nuttall, P. Austin, ed. (1840). A classical and archaeological dictionary of the manners, customs, laws, institutions, arts, etc. of the celebrated nations of antiquity, and of the middle ages. To which is prefixed A synoptical and chronological view of ancient history. London: Whittaker. OCLC 2667864.
- Nuttall, P. Austin, ed. (1859). The National cyclopædia of useful knowledge. Vol. 13: supplement. London: Routledge, Warne & Routledge. OCLC 707041054.
- Nuttall, P. Austin, ed. (1860s). Routledge's Diamond dictionary of the English language, adapted to the present state of English literature : in which every word is defined with precision and brevity, and the accentuation and orthography clearly shown. London: Routledge. OCLC 79439461.
- Nuttall, P. Austin, ed. (1869). Dictionary of scientific terms. London: Strahan & Co. OCLC 613146768.
- Walker, John (1859). Nuttall, P. Austin (ed.). Walker's pronouncing dictionary of the English language Enlarged and amended. London: Routledge. OCLC 793581437.
- Webster, Noah; Nuttall, P. Austin (1856). Webster's pronouncing dictionary of the English language, critically rev., and adapted to the present state of English literature. London: George Routledge. OCLC 867118592.
