= Corinna Bath =

German computer scientist

Corinna Bath (born 1963) is a German computer scientist and university lecturer. After holding the Maria Goeppert-Mayer Professorship for Gender, Technology and Mobility from 2012 to 2022, she has since been Head of the Coordination and Research Centre of the Women's Studies and Gender Studies Network at the University of Duisburg-Essen.

== Biography ==
Bath completed her studies in mathematics at the Free University of Berlin in 1993 with a diploma in mathematical logic. Between 1993 and 1995 she was a research assistant in the field of "Theory, Algorithmics, Logic" at the Department of Computer Science and from 1995 to 1996 in the field of "Logic and Set Theory" at the Department of Mathematics at the Technische Universität Berlin. From 1996 to 1997 she worked for the Mentoring project "Women in Science and Technology". From 1997 to 1998 she was a research assistant in the research project on modelling and controlling reactive systems at the Department of Computer Science at the Anhalt University of Applied Sciences and from 1998 to 2003 in the field of "Women's Studies and Technology" in the Computer Science programme and at the Centre for Feminist Studies at the University of Bremen. From 2004 to 2006, she worked on the project "Sociality with Machines. Anthropomorphisation and Gendering in Current Software Agent Research & Robotics" at the Institute for Philosophy of Science at the University of Vienna and subsequently until 2008 she was a Research Fellow at the Institute for Advanced Studies on Science, Technology and Society (IAS-STS) at the ifz Graz. From 2008 to 2009 she was a visiting researcher at the Centre for Social Research at the Karl-Franzens-University of Graz.

Bath completed her doctorate on the topic "De-gendering computer science artefacts. Fundamentals of a critical-feminist technology design" in 2009 at the Department of Computer Science at the University of Bremen. From 2009 to 2011, she was a postdoctoral researcher in the DFG Research Training Group "Gender as a Category of Knowledge" at Humboldt-Universität zu Berlin. From 2011 to 2012, she taught as a research assistant and visiting professor at the Centre for Interdisciplinary Women's and Gender Studies at Technische Universität Berlin.

Bath was the Maria Goeppert-Mayer Professor for Gender, Technology and Mobility at TU Braunschweig and Ostfalia University of Applied Sciences from 2012 to 2022 and taught as part of an international visiting professorship for "Gender & Technology" at Graz University of Technology in 2016. In the winter semester 2022/23, she taught as a visiting professor at the Institute for Media, Knowledge and Communication News at the University of Augsburg. and in the winter semester 2023/24 as Klara Marie Fassbinder visiting professor for gender studies at the University of Koblenz. Since 2023, she has headed the Coordination and Research Centre (KoFo) of the Network Women's and Gender Studies NRW at the University of Duisburg-Essen.

Bath was involved in the programme committee of the international conference "Gender, Knowledge, Informatics" - GEWINN in Heilbronn in 2018. She is a member of the COST Action IS1307 "New Materialism: Networking European Scholarship on "How Matter Comes to Matter" and deputy member of the Managing Committee for Germany. She was a member of the scientific advisory board for the establishment of GeStik (Gender Studies in Cologne) at the University of Cologne.

Bath is co-editor of the series ...revisited - Relektüren aus den Gender und Queer Studies at Springer VS. Until 2018, she was co-editor of the series Gender Interferences.

== Research ==
Bath's main areas of interest combine various disciplines of women's, gender and technology research: gender research in computer science and mechanical engineering as well as the gendering of technical artefacts, participatory technology design, diffractive design, feminist Materialisms as well as inter- and transdisciplinarity in research and practice.

As coordinator of the NRW Women's and Gender Studies Network, she creates links within higher education and science research from a gender perspective and among researchers at universities in the state of NRW. The aim is to transfer knowledge from gender research to the specialised public.

== Awards ==
Bath was awarded an honorary doctorate by Graz University of Technology in 2022 for outstanding scientific achievements in the field of gender studies and its integration in the technical sciences.
