= Richard Barth =

German musician (1850–1923)

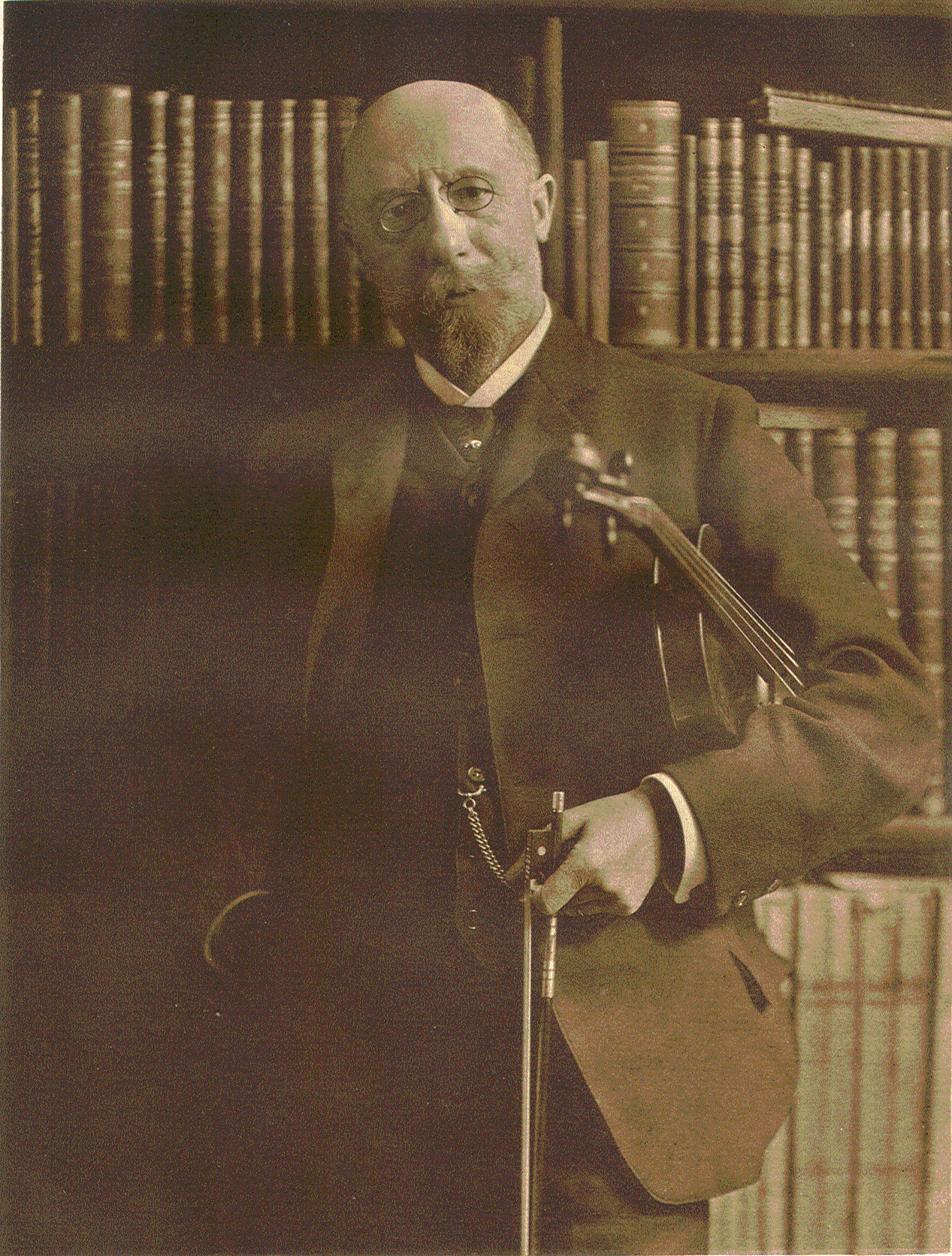
Barth in 1905.

Richard Barth (5 June 1850 in Grosswanzleben, Saxony – 25 December 1923 in Marburg) was a left-handed German violin virtuoso, conductor, music teacher and composer in the circle of Johannes Brahms. His Ciacona in B minor, Op. 21, composed in 1908, is a finely crafted tribute to J.S. Bach's Chaconne in post-Paganini technical and tonal terms.

== Biography ==
Barth was born in Saxony and from 1863 to 1867 studied with the renowned violinist Joseph Joachim. Barth used his left hand for bowing and his right hand for fingering and so played the violin "in reverse." Nonetheless, he was successful as a violinist and served as concertmaster of orchestras in Munster, Krefeld and Marburg and headed a string quartet. He was also a successful music teacher. He was music director of the university in Marburg before he moved to Hamburg where he became conductor of the Philharmonie and the Singakademie and directed the Conservatory beginning in 1908.

== Sources ==
- Liner notes by Eric Wen for the recording of Solo Chaconnes (by Bach, Barth and Max Reger) performed by Jennifer Koh (Cedille CDR 90000 060)
- Walter and Paula Rehberg, "Johannes Brahms," Namenregister, p. 597
