= Bernd-Rainer Barth =

German historian (born 1957)

Bernd-Rainer Barth (born East Berlin 1957) is a German historian of the modern period.

== Life ==
The son of an East German diplomat, Barth spent a large part of his early life in Hungary, studying between 1977 and 1983 at the Eötvös Loránd University in Budapest. His subject here was Hungarian studies (especially philology and history). He then worked in various academic institutions in East Germany until 1988 when he found himself banned from professional work.

After the reunification of Germany, during the 1990s, he worked as an academic research assistant at the Free University of Berlin. Between May 2002 and September 2003 he was an academic research assistant focusing on the "Theory and history of power" ("Theorie und Geschichte der Gewalt") at the Hamburg Institute for Social Research. Since then he has worked as a freelance historian, translator and academic journalist.

== Output ==
Bernd-Rainer Barth has become known, in particular, as a producer and co-author for the biographical collection Wer war wer in der DDR?, a standard reference resource. Barth has himself contributed to more than 600 of the entries in it.

He has also become known for a two volume study on Noel Field.
