= Philip Bath =

British clinician scientist

Philip Bath FRCP FMedSci
- Education: GKT School of Medical Education
- Occupations: Stroke physician, clinical researcher, academic
- Medical career
- Institutions: King's College London; St George's, University of London; University of Nottingham; Nottingham University Hospitals NHS Trust
- Sub-specialties: General medicine; stroke; clinical pharmacology
- Research: stroke; hypertension; clinical trial

Philip Michael Bath FRCP FMedSci (born 7 October 1956) is a British clinician scientist. He is Stroke Association Professor of Stroke Medicine at the Stroke Trials Unit within the University of Nottingham. He specialises clinically in stroke and academically has established large-scale trials in treating and preventing stroke. Bath worked as a junior doctor before specialising in general medicine, stroke and hypertension. He is an Honorary Consultant Physician at Nottingham University Hospitals NHS Trust. He has spent his academic career at St George's, University of London, King's College London and University of Nottingham.

== Early life and education ==
Bath was educated at Dulwich College in London, U.K. and studied medicine at St Thomas's Hospital Medical School, now GKT School of Medical Education. graduating with a Bachelor of Science (BSc) degree in Physiology in 1979, and Bachelor of Medicine, Bachelor of Surgery (MB BS) in 1982. He undertook research for a Doctor of Medicine (M.D.) degree, completing it in 1992 and winning the Rogers prize at University of London. His thesis was titled "Human monocyte behaviour and interactions with endothelium : aspects of physiology and pathology". He was awarded his Doctor of Science (D.Sc.) from the University of Nottingham in 2015, entitled "Management of blood pressure after stroke".

== Career ==
Having worked as a junior doctor, Bath specialised in internal medicine. In 1986 he became a Member of the Royal Colleges of Physicians of the United Kingdom (MRCP), and in 1998 a Fellow of the Royal College of Physicians (FRCP). Between 1987 and 1991 he studied under the supervision of Professor John Martin at King's College Hospital Medical School, now GKT School of Medical Education. From 1991 to 1993, Bath was a lecturer at the Blood Pressure Unit at St George's, University of London where he worked for the distinguished hypertensionologist, Professor Graham MacGregor. In 1993, he moved back to King's College Hospital Medical School, London, as Senior Lecturer and Honorary Consultant Physician at King's College Hospital where he established the Acute Stroke Unit. In 1998, he moved to the University of Nottingham as Stroke Association Professor of Stroke Medicine, and Head of the Division of Stroke Medicine. His Division was integrated into the former Division of Clinical Neuroscience in 2013, which he headed until 2021; Academic Stroke is now part of Mental Health & Clinical Neuroscience. He is an Honorary Consultant Physician at Nottingham University Hospitals NHS Trust.

=== Research ===
Bath is recognised as an expert in stroke and clinical trials. His current research is focused on the hyperacute treatment and prevention of stroke and treatment of cerebral small vessel disease (cSVD). As a Clinical Trialist, he has been Chief Investigator of five phase 3/4 trials: TAIST, ENOS, STEPS, TARDIS, and RIGHT-2. He is Chief Investigator of the ongoing National Institute for Health Research (NIHR) HTA-funded Pharyngeal Electrical stimulation for Acute Stroke dysphagia Trial (PhEAST, phase-4) and Alzheimer's Society funded CerebroVascular-Cognition (CVD-Cog) trial in people with non-lacunar ischaemic stroke and radiological white matter disease (phase-2c).

== Honours ==
In 2016 Bath was elected a Fellow of the Academy of Medical Sciences (FMedSci) and appointed as Senior Investigator at the NIHR. He is a Fellow of the European Stroke Organisation (2005) and American Heart Association (2014). He gave the Stroke Association keynote lecture in 2015. He received the Feinberg Award for Excellence in Clinical Stroke from the American Heart Association in 2016, and the British Pharmacological Society's Lilly Prize in 2024. He has been given the President's Award from the British Association of Stroke Physicians (BASP) in 2019, the President's Award from the World Stroke Organization (WSO) in 2021, and the President's Award from the European Stroke Organisation (ESO) in 2023.
