= The Nuttall Encyclopædia =

Late 19th-century encyclopedia

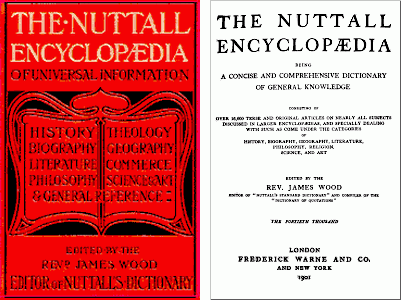
- Language: English
- Genre: Encyclopedia
- Publication date: 1900
- Publication place: United Kingdom

The Nuttall Encyclopædia: Being a Concise and Comprehensive Dictionary of General Knowledge is a late 19th-century encyclopedia, edited by Rev. James Wood, first published in London in 1900 by Frederick Warne & Co Ltd.

Editions were recorded for 1920, 1930, 1938 and 1956 and was still being sold in 1966. Editors included G. Elgie Christ and A. L. Hayden for 1930, Lawrence Hawkins Dawson for 1938 and C. M. Prior for 1956.

== Description ==
The Nuttall Encyclopædia is named for Dr. Peter Austin Nuttall (d. 1869), whose works, such as Standard Pronouncing Dictionary of the English Language (published in 1863), were eventually acquired by Frederick Warne, and would be published for decades to come.

The title page proclaims this encyclopedia to be "a concise and comprehensive dictionary of general knowledge consisting of over 16,000 terse and original articles on nearly all subjects discussed in larger encyclopædias, and specially dealing with such as come under the categories of history, biography, geography, literature, philosophy, religion, science, and art".

The entries or articles in this work are generally very short, and are mostly about individuals and places; while it has entries for fictional characters from Charles Dickens' books, the encyclopedia lacks entries for fruit. It often reflects the personal worldview of the author, viewing events from a definite perspective. This can be seen in entries like Dates of Epoch-Making Events. As another example, the entry for Venezuela presents a British view of an 1899 event:

...the boundary line between the British colony and Venezuela was for long matter of keen dispute, but by the intervention of the United States at the request of the latter a treaty between the contending parties was concluded, referring the matter to a court of arbitration, which met at Paris in 1895, and settled it in 1899, in vindication, happily, of the British claim, the Schomburgk line being now declared to be the true line, and the gold-fields ours.

In 2004, Project Gutenberg published a version of the 1907 edition, which is now in the public domain.
