= Christian Samuel Barth =

German oboist and composer (1735–1809)

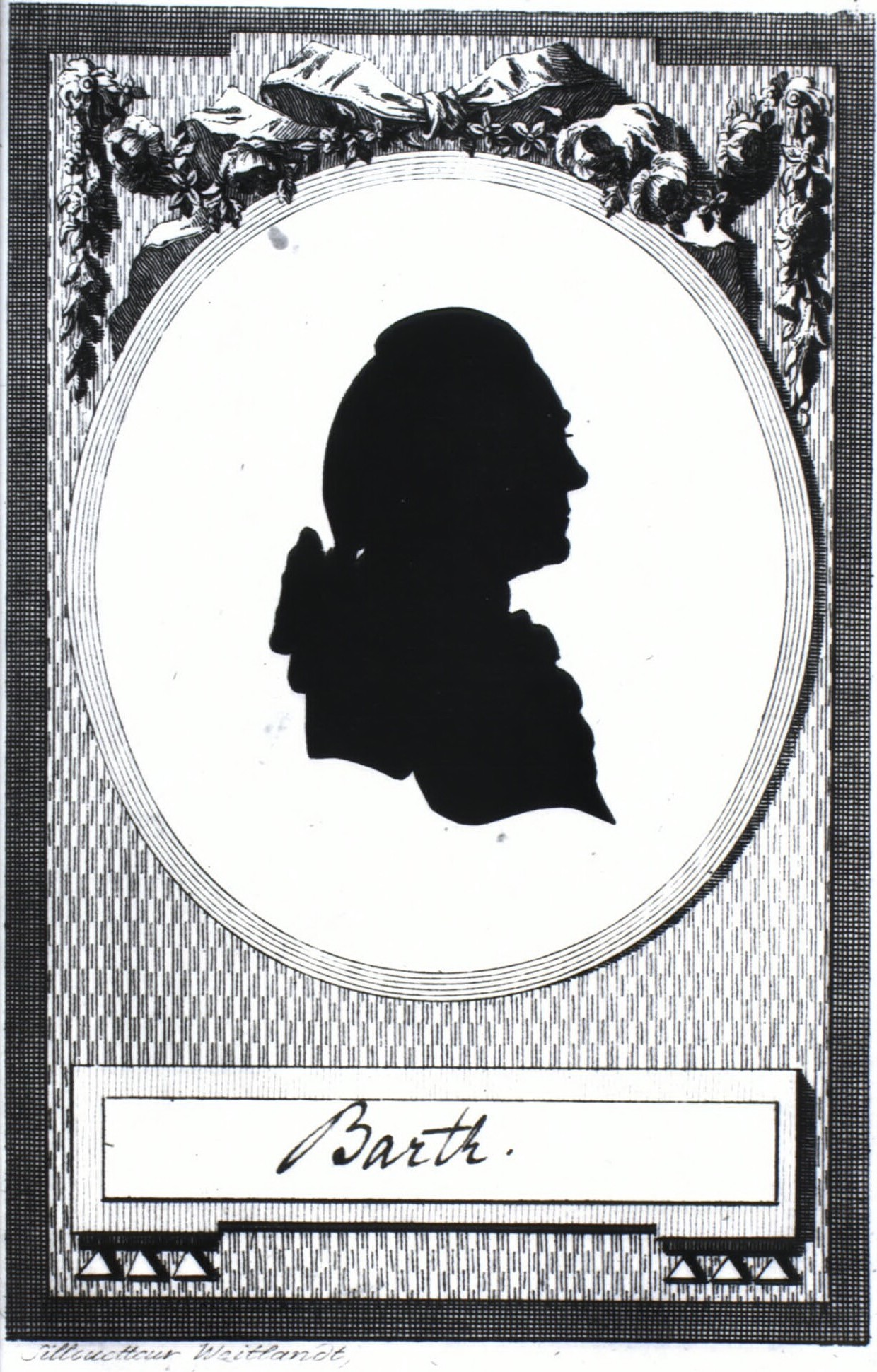
Silhouette portrait of Christian Samuel Barth by Joachim Gottfried Wilhelm Weitlandt-

Christian Samuel Barth (13 January 1735 – 8 July 1809) was a German oboist and composer of the classical period.

== Life ==
Christian Samuel Barth was born in Glauchau, as the son of the merchant George Samuel Barth. He studied at the Thomasschule zu Leipzig, where he was educated by Johann Sebastian Bach. As an oboist, Barth worked from 1753 in the court orchestra in Rudolstadt, from 1762 in Weimar, from 1768 in Hannover and from 1772 in Kassel. Finally, in 1786, he became a member of the Hofkapelle at the royal court in Copenhagen, which was then briefly under the direction of Johann Gottlieb Naumann. On account of his age and infirmity, he was relieved from his duties in 1798 and received an annual pension of 500 Reichsthaler until his death in 1809.

Barth's two sons, Frederik Philip Carl August (1774–1804) and Christian Frederik (1787–1861), having been taught by their father, both became virtuoso performers on the oboe as well as composers. The youngest son became renowned as a touring soloist.

== Works ==
It seems that most of Barth's compositions have been lost. He is known to have composed an Ouverture in E major, op. 18, 4 oboe sonatas, a Cantata Gelobet seist du Jesu Christ, and at least 4 oboe concertos (lost).

== Bibliography ==
- Rudolf Elvers (1953). "Barth, Christian Samuel". Neue Deutsche Biographie (in German). Vol. 1. Berlin: Duncker & Humblot. pp. 601–602. (11606319X.html full text online).
- Schilling, Gustav (1835). Encyclopädie der gesammten musikalischen Wissenschaften, oder, Universal-Lexicon der Tonkunst (in German). Stuttgart: Franz Heinrich Köhler. p. 451.
