= John Bathe =

John Bathe may refer to:

- John Bathe (died 1409), MP for Dorset 1397 and 1402
- John Bathe (Jesuit) (1610–1649), Irish Jesuit
- John Bathe (politician) (died c.1559), Solicitor-General for Ireland
- John Bathe (died 1586) (1536–1586), Irish lawyer and statesman
- John Bathe (mayor), Lord Mayor of Dublin, 1350–51

== See also ==
- John Bath, rugby league footballer of the 1960s
