= Klara Barth =

German politician (1880–1940)

- Born: 23 December 1880; Ommersheim, Mandelbachtal, Germany
- Died: 13 June 1940 (aged 59); Ludwigshafen, Rhineland-Palatinate, Germany
- Occupation: Politician
- Political party: Bavarian People's Party

Klara Barth (23 December 1880 – 13 June 1940) was a German politician from the Bavarian People's Party. She served as Member of the Bavarian Landtag between 1920 and 1933.
