= André Barth =

German politician (born 1969)

Member of the Landtag of Saxony
- Incumbent
- Assumed office 29 September 2014
- Constituency: Sächsische Schweiz-Osterzgebirge 2 (2024–present)

Personal details
- Born: 26 October 1969 (age 56) Dresden
- Party: Alternative for Germany (since 2013)
- Other political affiliations: Social Democratic Party (until 2010)

André Barth (born 26 October 1969 in Dresden) is a German politician serving as a member of the Landtag of Saxony since 2014. He has served as first deputy mayor of Altenberg since 2024.
