= Janet Barth =

American radiation engineer

Janet L. Barth (née McCumber) is a retired American radiation engineer who became the first female chief of engineering at NASA's Goddard Space Flight Center.

== Education and career ==
Barth was a 1967 graduate of Mason County Central High School in Scottville, Michigan. After beginning her college studies as a biology student at the University of Michigan, Barth switched to the University of Maryland, College Park, where she graduated with a degree in mathematics in 1978. Meanwhile, she had become a co-op student at the Goddard Space Flight Center, and after graduation she became a radiation and hardness assurance engineer there.

At Goddard, she worked for the NASA Electronic Parts and Packaging, involving radiation hardening for electronic components, and helped author an influential white paper on heliophysics research. She became project manager for a project studying the effects of radiation on spacecraft in 2001, and branch head of engineering in 2002, for the Flight Data Systems and Radiation Effects branch. As branch head, she led the development of the systems of the James Webb Space Telescope for commanding the telescope and handling its data. She was promoted again to chief of the division of electrical engineering in 2010, becoming the center's first female chief of engineering.

She was president of the IEEE Nuclear and Plasma Sciences Society for the 2013–2014 term, before retiring in 2014. In her retirement, she has worked on the advisory board for aerospace company Miller Engineering and Research (MERC).

== Recognition ==
Barth was elected as an IEEE Fellow, in the 2017 class of fellows, "for leadership in spacecraft reliability and electronic systems". She is a distinguished lecturer of the IEEE Nuclear & Plasma Sciences Society.

The Goddard Space Flight Center gave her the Robert H. Goddard Award of Merit in 2014. She was the 2022 recipient of the Richard F. Shea Distinguished Member Award of the IEEE Nuclear & Plasma Sciences Society.
