= Ronald J. Bath =

United States Air Force general

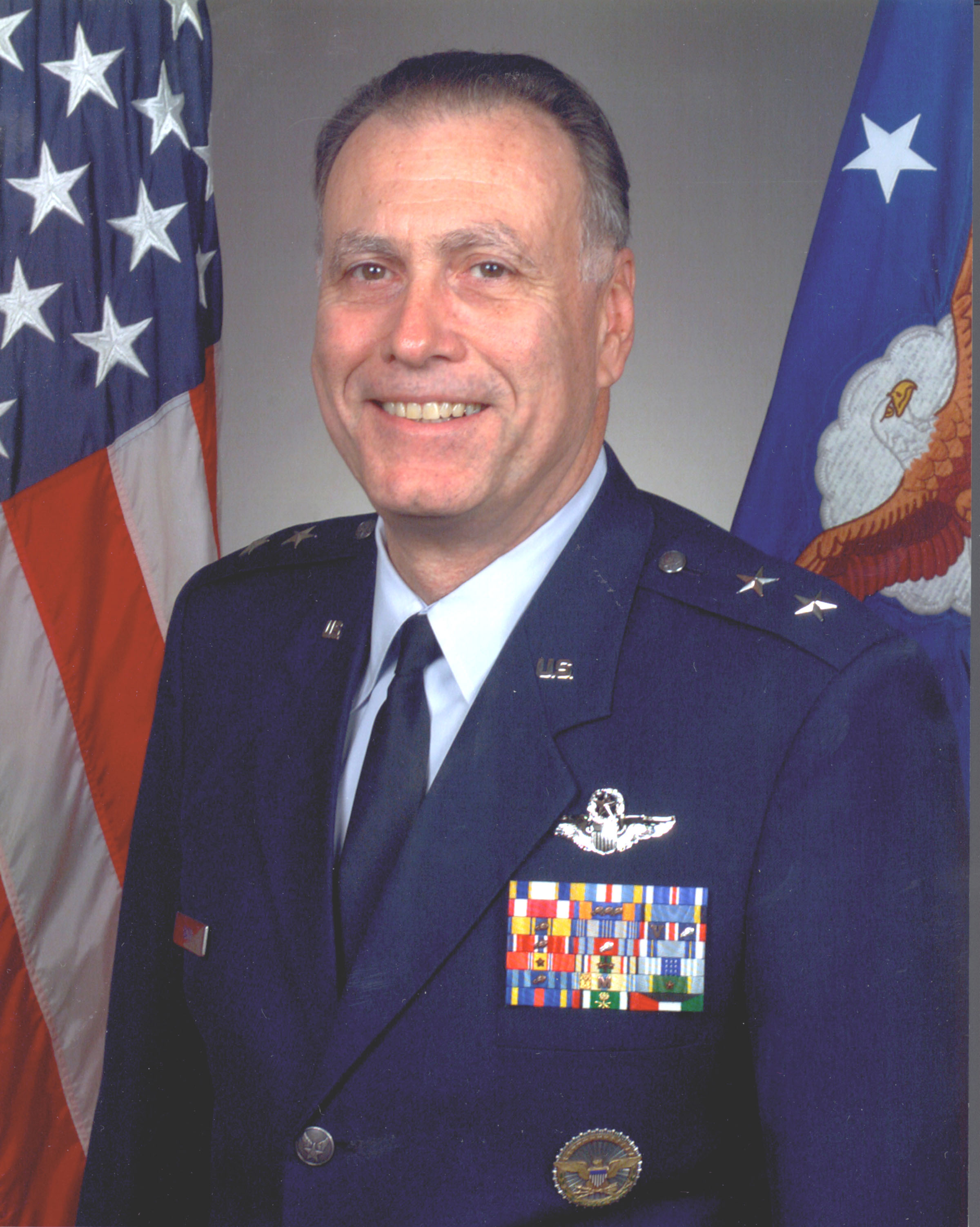
- Bath, during his tenure as a major general.
- Born: Ronald Jay Bath; November 4, 1944 (age 81); Nevada, U.S.
- Military career
- Allegiance: United States of America
- Branch: United States Air Force
- Service years: 1968–2006
- Rank: Major general
- Unit: Nevada Air National Guard
- Conflicts: Gulf War; Operation Desert Storm
- Other work: RJBath Group

Ronald Jay Bath (born November 4, 1944) is a retired United States Air Force major general who directed U.S. Air Force Strategic Planning for the service's Deputy Chief of Staff for Plans and Programs at service headquarters in the Pentagon.

Bath's prior assignment was as director, Quadrennial Defense Review and Defense Integration. The Defense Integration Office was established to prepare and represent the Air Force in the QDR and the follow-on actions, including the Defense Planning Guidance within the Office of the U.S. Secretary of Defense.

== Career ==
Bath began his military career in 1968 as a boiler operator and heating specialist in the enlisted ranks of the Nevada Air National Guard. During the 1997 QDR, he was the Air National Guard assistant to the director for the Air Force effort. Bath was one of 16 senior military officers representing the four services and the single National Guard officer assigned as professional staff to the 1995 congressionally mandated Commission on Roles and Missions of the Armed Forces. Having been a traditional guardsman and air technician, Bath is a command pilot with more than 3,500 flying hours in the RF-101 and RF-4 Phantom II. He flew 31 combat missions in Operation Desert Storm, during the Persian Gulf War.

=== Assignments ===
- June 1969 – June 1970: student, Undergraduate Pilot Training, Vance Air Force Base, Oklahoma
- June 1970 – July 1984: RF-101 reconnaissance pilot, 192nd Tactical Reconnaissance Squadron, Reno, Nevada
- July 1984 – November 1990: RF-4C pilot and flight commander, 192nd Tactical Reconnaissance Squadron, Reno, Nevada
- November 1990 – July 1991: flight safety officer, 35th Tactical Fighter Wing, Sheik Isa Air Base, Bahrain
- July 1991 – July 1993: Chief of Safety, later, Chief of Plans, 152nd Tactical Reconnaissance Group, Reno, Nevada
- July 1993 – July 1994: National Security Fellow, John F. Kennedy School of Government, Harvard University, Cambridge, Massachusetts
- July 1994 – July 1995: professional staff, Commission on Roles and Missions of the Armed Forces, Washington, D.C.
- July 1995 – July 1996: Air National Guard adviser to the Army Division Redesign Study, Washington, D.C.
- July 1996 – December 1997: Air National Guard assistant to the Director, Air Force QDR, Headquarters U.S. Air Force, Washington, D.C.
- December 1997 – December 1999: Division Chief, National Defense Review, Directorate of Air Force Strategic Planning and Programming, Headquarters U.S. Air Force, Washington, D.C.
- December 1999 – September 2001: Deputy Director, Air Force QDR, Headquarters U.S. Air Force, Washington, D.C.
- September 2001 – March 2002: Director, Air Force QDR and Defense Integration, Office of the Special Assistant to the Deputy Chief of Staff for Plans and Programs, Headquarters U.S. Air Force, Washington, D.C.
- March 2002 – May 2006: Director, Air Force Strategic Planning, Deputy Chief of Staff for Plans and Programs, Headquarters U.S. Air Force, Washington, D.C.

=== Flight information ===
- Rating: Command pilot
- Flight hours: More than 3,500
- Aircraft flown: T-41, T-37, T-38, F-101, RF-101, C-54, F-4 and RF-4

=== Awards and decorations ===
U.S. Air Force Command Pilot Badge

Air Force Distinguished Service Medal
Defense Superior Service Medal
Distinguished Flying Cross
Meritorious Service Medal
Air Medal with three bronze oak leaf clusters
Aerial Achievement Medal
Air Force Commendation Medal with bronze oak leaf cluster
Air Force Achievement Medal
Air Force Outstanding Unit Award with Valor device and silver oak leaf cluster
Air Force Organizational Excellence Award with bronze oak leaf cluster
Combat Readiness Medal with silver oak leaf cluster
Air Reserve Forces Meritorious Service Medal
National Defense Service Medal with bronze service star
Southwest Asia Service Medal with two bronze service stars
Air Force Overseas Short Tour Service Ribbon
Air Force Longevity Service Award with bronze oak leaf cluster
Armed Forces Reserve Medal with bronze hourglass and M device
Small Arms Expert Marksmanship Ribbon with bronze service star
Air Force Training Ribbon
Kuwait Liberation Medal (Saudi Arabia)
Kuwait Liberation Medal (Kuwait)

=== Dates of rank ===
Promotions
Insignia	Rank	Date
	Major general	April 1, 2002
	Brigadier general	July 1, 1999
	Colonel	December 23, 1994
	Lieutenant colonel	June 14, 1987
	Major	March 18, 1983
	Captain	March 18, 1976
	First lieutenant	March 18, 1972
	Second lieutenant	March 18, 1969

== Education ==
- 1968: B.S., business and agriculture, University of Nevada, Reno
- 1971: MBA, University of Nevada, Reno
- 1975: J.D., McGeorge School of Law, University of the Pacific, Sacramento, California
- 1982: Air Command and Staff College, by seminar
- 1993: Air War College, by correspondence
- 1994: National Security Fellow, John F. Kennedy School of Government, Harvard University, Cambridge, Massachusetts
- 2014: Associate of Applied Science in Welding Technology, Truckee Meadows Community College, Reno, Nevada

== Personal life ==
Bath retired in November 2007 and formed the RJBath Group, specializing in classified and unclassified defense analysis consulting.
