= Auguste Barth =

French orientalist (1834–1916)

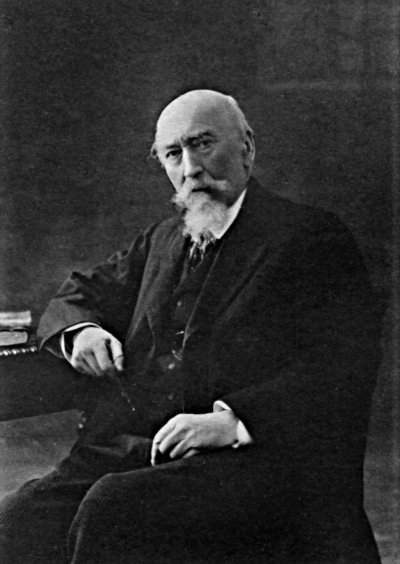
- Born: 22 May 1834; Strasbourg
- Died: 15 April 1916 (aged 81); Paris

Auguste Barth (born in Strasbourg 22 May 1834; died in Paris 15 April 1916) was a French orientalist.

== Biography ==
He is best known by his work in connection with the religions of India. His volume, Les religions de l'Inde (Paris, 1879), was translated into English (London, 1882). Mention may also be made of his Inscriptions sanscrites du Cambodge (Sanskrit inscriptions of Cambodia; Paris, 1885) and of numerous monographs and reviews in Journal Asiatique, in Mélusine, and in the Mémoires de la Société de Linguistique. His annual reports on researches into the history of Indian religions, in Revue de l'Histoire des Religions (1880) are especially valuable. He was a member of the French Institute.

Barth became a foreign member of the Royal Netherlands Academy of Arts and Sciences in 1896.

== Works (selection) ==
- Les Religions de l'Inde (1879)
- Inscriptions sanscrites du Cambodge (1885)
- Mémoires concernant l'Asie orientale, published by the Académie des inscriptions et belles-lettres under the direction of MM. Senart, Barth, Émile Chavannes, Cordier (3 volumes, 1913–1919)
- Quarante ans d'indianisme : œuvres de Auguste Barth, recueillies à l'occasion de son quatre-vingtième anniversaire (5 volumes, 1914–1927)
