= John Barth (American football) =

American football and basketball coach (1927–2004)

Biographical details
- Born: April 4, 1927; Rockford, Illinois, U.S.
- Died: October 16, 2004 (aged 77)

Playing career

Football
- 1937–1940: Ripon

Coaching career (HC unless noted)

Football
- 1941–1946: Portage HS (WI)
- 1947–1960: Wisconsin–Platteville (DC)
- 1964–1965: Wisconsin–Platteville

Basketball
- 1946–1963: Wisconsin–Platteville

Administrative career (AD unless noted)
- 1947–1982: Wisconsin–Platteville

Head coaching record
- Overall: 3–11–3 (college football); 199–145 (college basketball)

John Barth (April 4, 1927 – October 16, 2004) was an American football and basketball player and coach. He served as the head football coach at University of Wisconsin–Platteville from 1964 to 1965, and coached the school's men's basketball team from 1946 to 1963.

== Head coaching record ==
=== College football ===
Year	Team	Overall	Conference	Standing	Bowl/playoffs
Platteville State Pioneers (Wisconsin State University Conference) (1964–1965)
1964	Platteville State	1–5–2	0–5–1	9th	
1965	Platteville State	2–6–1	1–5	8th	
Platteville State:		3–11–3	1–10–1		
Total:		3–11–3			
