= Los Angeles Community College District =

Community college district in Los Angeles, California, United States

Coordinates: 34.0491°N 118.2578°W

Location
- Los Angeles, California United States

District information
- Type: Public
- Grades: College
- Schools: 9

Other information
- Website: www.laccd.edu

The Los Angeles Community College District (LACCD) is the community college district serving Los Angeles, California, and some of its neighboring cities and certain unincorporated areas of Los Angeles County. Its headquarters are in Downtown Los Angeles. Over the course of its history, LACCD has served as educator to more than three million students. The Los Angeles Community College District is the largest community college district in the United States and is one of the largest in the world.

The LACCD consists of nine colleges and covers an area of more than 882 square miles (2,280 km^{2}). They serve students in the Alhambra, Beverly Hills, Burbank, Culver City, Garvey, Las Virgenes, Los Angeles, Montebello, Palos Verdes and San Gabriel school districts. The district covers the Los Angeles city limits, San Fernando, Calabasas, Agoura Hills, Hidden Hills, Burbank, West Hollywood, Beverly Hills, Culver City, Alhambra, Monterey Park, San Gabriel, Rosemead (southern portion), Montebello, Commerce, Vernon, Huntington Park, Bell, Cudahy, Bell Gardens, South Gate, Gardena, Carson, Lomita, Palos Verdes Estates, Rolling Hills, Rancho Palos Verdes, and numerous unincorporated communities, including East Los Angeles, Florence-Firestone, Athens, and Walnut Park.

== Colleges ==
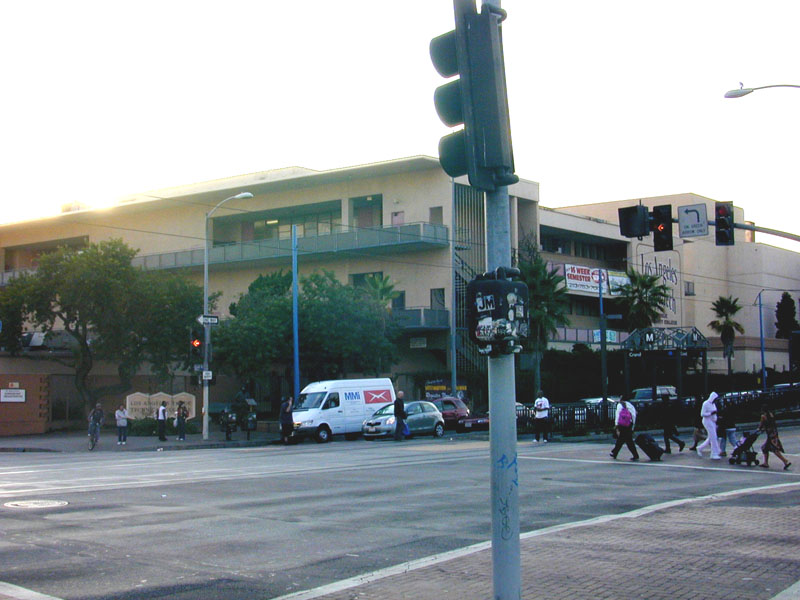
Los Angeles Trade-Tech College

Campus	Location	Founded	Enrollment				
Campus	Location	Founded	Enrollment	East Los Angeles College	Monterey Park	1945	32,225
Los Angeles City College	East Hollywood, Los Angeles	1929	17,157				
Los Angeles Harbor College	Harbor City, Los Angeles	1949	9,442				
Los Angeles Mission College	Sylmar, Los Angeles	1975	11,865				
Los Angeles Pierce College	Woodland Hills, Los Angeles	1947	18,081				
Los Angeles Trade-Technical College	Historic South Central Los Angeles	1925	13,497				
Los Angeles Valley College	Valley Glen, Los Angeles	1949	17,642				
Los Angeles Southwest College	West Athens	1967	6,053				
West Los Angeles College	Culver City	1969	9,955				

== Board of trustees ==
The Los Angeles Community College District is governed by an elected Board of Trustees first established in 1969.
