= Hardie Gramatky =

American painter

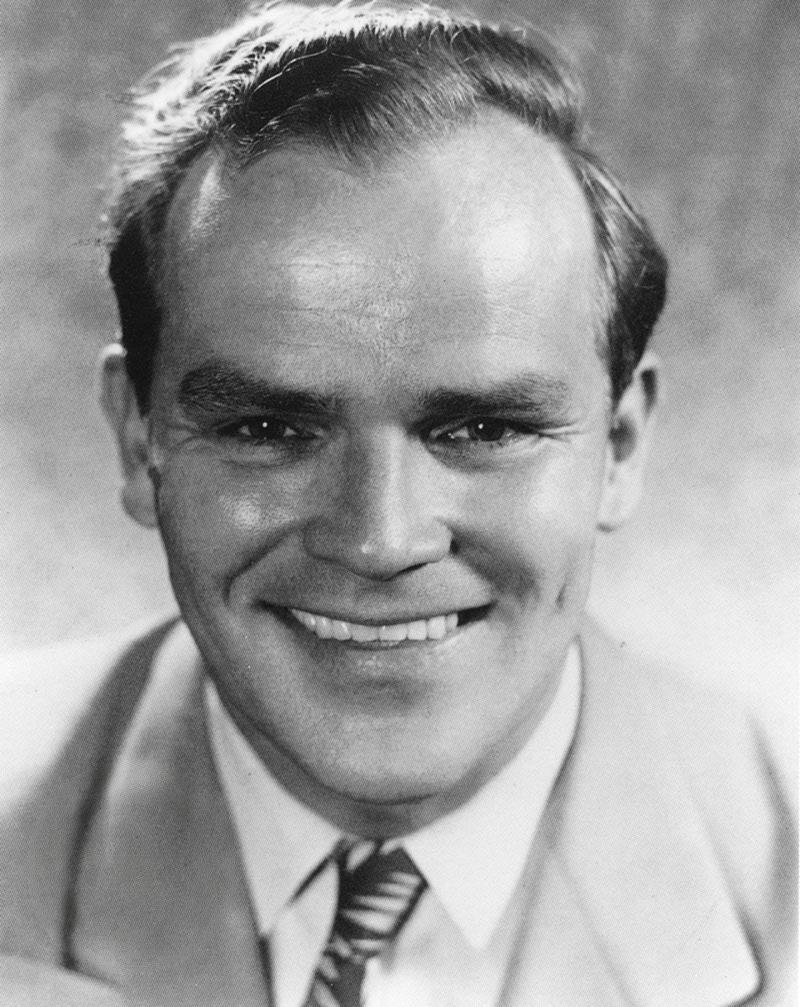
- Born: April 12, 1907; Dallas, Texas, US
- Died: April 29, 1979 (aged 72); Westport, Connecticut, US
- Citizenship: American
- Education: Chouinard Art Institute
- Occupations: Painter; Illustrathor; Author
- Known for: Little Toot
- Movement: Watercolor painting
- Spouse: Dorothea Cooke Gramatky (m. 1932)
- Children: Linda Gramatky Smith
- Website: www.gramatky.com

Bernhard August "Hardie" Gramatky, Jr. (April 12, 1907 – April 29, 1979) was an American painter, writer, animator, and illustrator. In a 2006 article in Watercolor Magazine, Andrew Wyeth named him as one of America's 20 greatest watercolorists. He wrote and illustrated several children's books, most notably Little Toot.

== Early life ==
Hardie Gramatky was born in Dallas, Texas, the second of three sons born to Bernhard Gramatky and Blanche Gunner Gramatky. Ten years later, following the death of his father, his mother moved the family to the Wilmar – South San Gabriel area, a then semi-rural suburb a few miles east of Los Angeles. Gramatky attended local schools in Wilmar, and then Alhambra High School in nearby Alhambra. Displaying a precocious artistic talent, he began submitting his sketches to a "young folks section" published in the Los Angeles Times, and by the early 1920s had earned a reputation as the section's leading artist.

== Education ==
After high school Gramatky moved to Northern California to attend Stanford University. Though he majored in English he continued to study art as well, but after two years at the university one of his professors advised him that the school's art department had no more to teach him, and so he returned to Southern California where, in 1928, he enrolled in Chouinard Art Institute. Developing a deep interest in watercolor painting, he later said that during this period he produced an average of five small watercolors per day. By 1929, he had become a proficient watercolorist and was recognized as one of the true innovators in the development of "California Scene" watercolor painting. These skills helped him to get a job that year as a senior animator at the Walt Disney Studios, where he remained for the next six years.

== Recognition as a painter ==
In the early 1930s, he became active in the California Watercolor Society, an organization founded in 1920. It was largely through his efforts that the young watercolorists of the California School were able to dominate the Society and establish it as an internationally recognized organization. In 1932, he married Dorothea Cooke, who had been his fellow student at Chouinard. In 1936, Gramatky moved to New York City. There, the Ferargil Gallery began exhibiting his watercolors and, in 1937, those of other members of the California School as well. Gramatky was also among those whose work was exhibited in a major show of California artists mounted at the Art Institute of Chicago that year. Ultimately, his work would be exhibited at numerous museums, including the Whitney Museum of American Art and New York City's Metropolitan Museum of Art. Examples of his work are part of the permanent collections of the Brooklyn Museum of Art, Chicago Art Institute, and Frye Art Museum in Seattle, Washington, among others.

== Author and illustrator ==
By the 1940s, he was producing commercial art to be used for magazine illustrations and began writing and illustrating a series of children's books, including Hercules, Loopy, Creepers Jeep and Sparky. Gramatky's most successful book was his first, Little Toot, published in 1939. It became a perennial best seller, spawning several sequels, and was animated by Disney as part of the feature anthology Melody Time. During World War II, he worked in Hollywood producing training films for the United States Army Air Forces.

After the war, Gramatky returned to the East Coast, settling in Westport, Connecticut, where he would live for the rest of the life. He continued working as a commercial illustrator producing art for Fortune, Collier's, Woman's Day, True, American and Reader's Digest. He also wrote and illustrated several sequels to the original Little Toot story. Gramatky died of cancer on April 29, 1979. His last book, Little Toot and the Loch Ness Monster, was unfinished at the time of his death. Following the 50th anniversary of Little Toot it was completed by his wife and daughter, Dorothea Cooke Gramatky and Linda Gramatky Smith, and published in 1989.

== Professional organizations ==
Hardie Gramatky was an elected Academician (24 aquarellists) member of the National Academy of Design, New York Watercolor Club, American Watercolor Society, and the California Watercolor Society.
