= Fremont Elementary School =

There are several elementary schools in the United States named Fremont Elementary School:

- Fremont Elementary School, Santa Ana, California
- Fremont Elementary School (Mundelein, Illinois)
- Fremont Elementary School, Sunset, Utah
- Fremont Elementary School, Alhambra, California
- Fremont Elementary School (Battle Creek, Michigan)
