= Wilmar, California =

Former placename in Los Angeles County, California, US

Coordinates: 34°04′15″N 118°06′30″W

Wilmar was the former name of a then-unincorporated district of San Gabriel Township in the San Gabriel Valley, about eight miles east of the center of Los Angeles. In the 1940 census, Wilmar had a population of 11,590. Wilmar was combined with the unincorporated communities of Garvey (to the east of Wilmar) and Potrero Heights (to the south of Wilmar) to become the unincorporated community of South San Gabriel in the early 1950s. It was named for the city of Wilmar, Arkansas by "Arkies" who migrated to the area as a rural counterpart to their roots in Arkansas.

Most of South San Gabriel was later annexed by the city of Rosemead (mostly during the mid-1960s), though parts of it were annexed by other adjacent cities and part of it remains unincorporated today. Most of the area of South San Gabriel which had been called Wilmar was annexed by Rosemead, but one section of it lying north of the San Bernardino Freeway between New Avenue and San Gabriel Boulevard was annexed by the city of San Gabriel.

The main streets of Wilmar were Del Mar Avenue, Graves Avenue, Hellman Avenue, Ramona Boulevard, and Garvey Avenue. It was the site of a Los Angeles County branch library, and of three schools of the Garvey School District, as well as Portero Heights School, which was first in its own district and later in the Montebello Unified School District.

The area of Wilmar known as Potrero Heights, south of the intersection of Del Mar and Graves Avenues, came to be known in the 1950s as Garvey Hills. This area was first home of the Wilmar gang, members were identified by their tattoo of the name Wilmar and a picture of a donkey. Later as the ethnicity of the area changed, it became home to the infamous Lomas gang, one of Los Angeles' earliest Hispanic gangs.
