= Alhambra Union High School District =

Defunct school district in California, United States

Alhambra Union High School District was a high school district based in Alhambra, California.

== History ==
On April 22, 1898, a successful election was held to establish a high school in Alhambra. The election, which passed with a vote of 49 to 9, established the Alhambra High School District. The high school began classes for twenty-three students on the second floor of Garfield School on October 1, 1898. At the first commencement in June 1899, three students received diplomas.

The need for schools grew with the population, and the communities approved bonds to provide these schools. The second building program began in 1905 with the completion of the first of three Alhambra High Schools.

Previously all of San Gabriel was a part of the district, but the California Legislature in 1931 made it legal for a high school district to be created within 2.5 miles (4.0 km) of another one, allowing San Gabriel voters to authorize the creation of a new high school district the following November. Much of San Gabriel is now in the San Gabriel Unified School District.

Circa 1985 the district proposed building a new high school in Rosemead. The California Allocation Board awarded $44.6 million for the school construction, but the district was having difficulty obtaining $1 million to do an environmental impact study. The Garvey School District, the elementary school district for Rosemead, opposed the site chosen for the new Rosemead high school. The Mayor of Rosemead also stated his belief that another high school may not have been necessary in Rosemead.

In 2004 it merged with the Alhambra School District, which operated K-8 schools, to form the Alhambra Unified School District.
