= Gabrielino High School =

Public secondary school in San Gabriel, California, United States

Location
- 1327 South San Gabriel Boulevard; San Gabriel, California 91776; United States; 34.0823°N 118.0917°W

Information
- Type: Public secondary
- Motto: Pride, Tradition, Honor
- Opened: September 8, 1994; 32 years ago
- School district: San Gabriel Unified School District
- NCES School ID: 063442503273
- Principal: Vince Lopez
- Teaching staff: 67.77 (FTE)
- Grades: 9–12
- Enrollment: 1,483 (2023–2024)
- Student to teacher ratio: 21.88
- Campus size: 20.97 acres (0.0849 km^{2})
- Campus type: Urban
- Colors: Navy blue and silver
- Athletics conference: Mission Valley League; Montview League
- Mascot: Bald eagle
- Newspaper: Tongva Times
- Feeder schools: Jefferson Middle School
- Website: gabrielino.sgusd.k12.ca.us

Gabrielino High School (abbreviated GHS and often referred to as Gab) is a public high school located on San Gabriel Boulevard in San Gabriel, California, 10 miles (16 km) east of Downtown Los Angeles, serving the 9th to 12th grades. It was established in 1994. Gabrielino High School is accredited by Western Association of Schools and Colleges (WASC). It is a part of the San Gabriel Unified School District.

The district, and therefore the high school's attendance boundary, includes most of San Gabriel as well as sections of Rosemead, East San Gabriel, and Temple City.

== Rankings ==
Gabrielino High School is a California Distinguished School, the distinction in and 2009.

In addition, Newsweek magazine ranked Gabrielino as one of the United States' top 1000 high schools as determined by the number of Advanced Placement courses taken at the school in 2005 divided by the number of graduating seniors.

In 2007, Gabrielino earned the Silver Medal status from the U.S. News & World Report based on standardized test performance in Math and English and AP courses taken and passed with a "3" or better. Based on this report, Gabrielino is placed in the top 3% of the nation or top 505 schools. About 39% of graduates go on to four-year universities nationwide while about 55% attend community college after graduation. In 2012, Gabrielino High School was nationally ranked the 985th best high school, and the 190th best high school in California.

== History ==
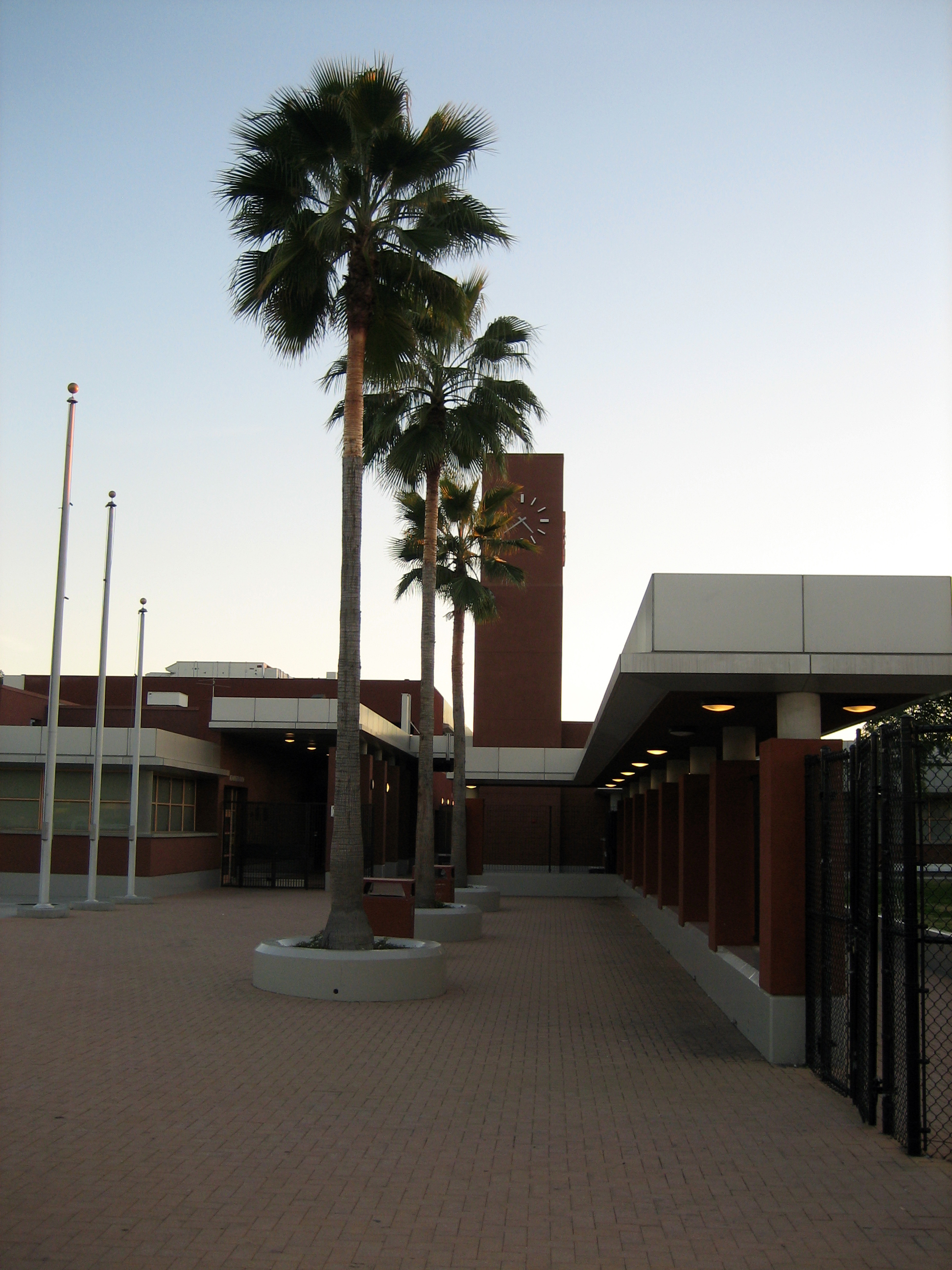
Facade of Gabrielino High School

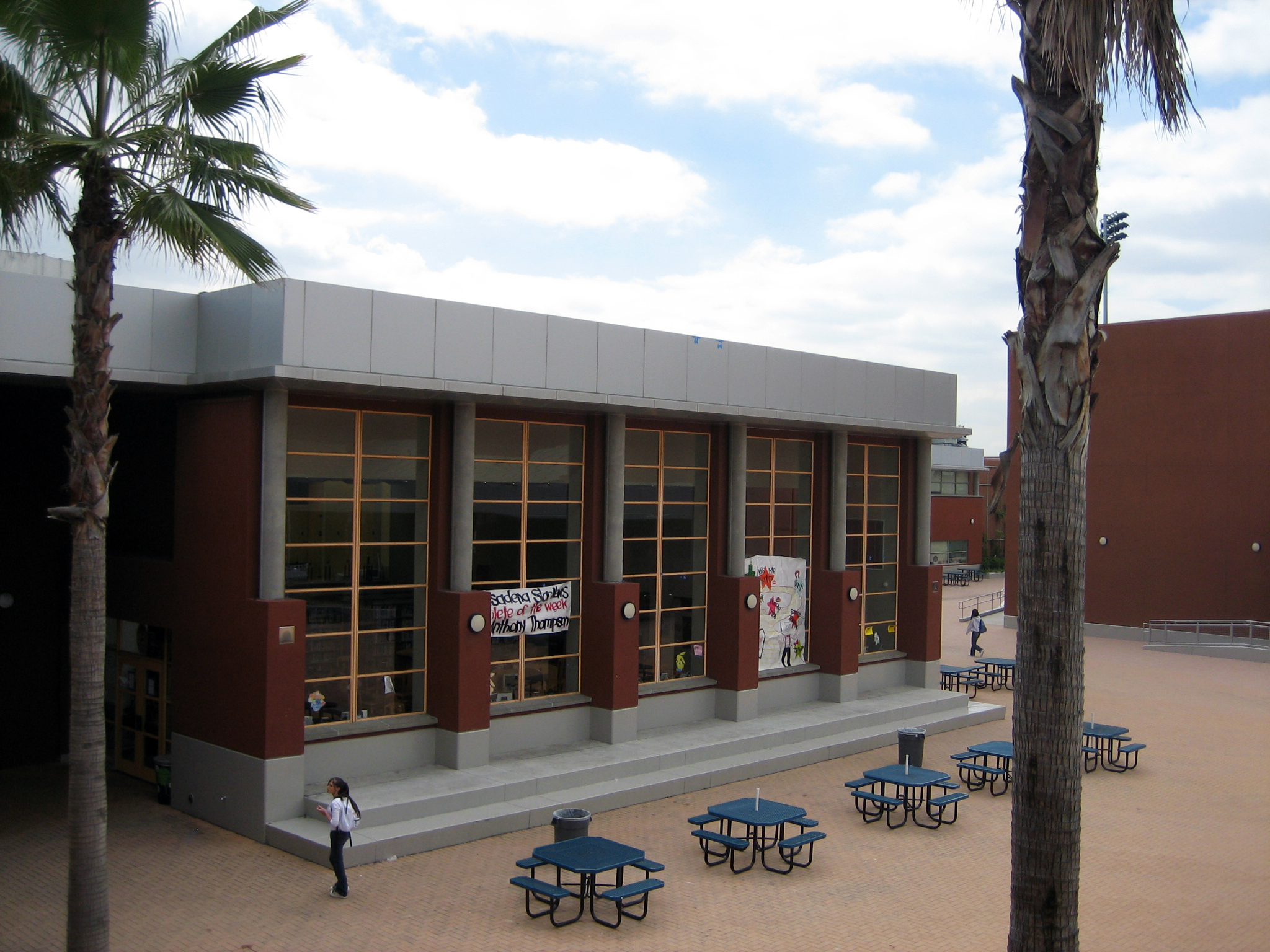
The glass-lined Media Center

Prior to 1994, high school students belonging to the San Gabriel Unified School District (SGUSD) attended San Gabriel High School, which is part of the Alhambra School District, since SGUSD did not have a high school of its own.

In April 1992, San Gabriel residents won the right to educate their own high school students by ballot measure, winning 61% of votes to establish an autonomous school operated by the SGUSD. In response, the Alhambra School District (ASD) filed a lawsuit alleging that the California Board of Education had improperly excluded Alhambra voters and because ASD stood to lose as much as US$1.8 million in state funding, since the planned high school would siphon away 1,400 students. Homeowners in San Gabriel also led the opposition to a bitterly disputed bond measure, claiming they would fight the district's attempts to raise the funds necessary to build the high school, which would be temporarily situated at the site of the old Jefferson Middle School campus. They complained the high school would cause congestion and lower their property values.

On November 13, 1993, San Gabriel Unified School District officials voted 327 to 241 to name the planned high school "Gabrielino High School," which became the first public building in California to honor the Gabrielino Indians (Tongva people).

On September 8, 1994, Gabrielino High School opened its doors to its first class, teaching 9th graders. Alhambra School District retained responsibility to school 10th to 12th graders until 1995, as part of an agreement signed by both districts in June, the same month Alhambra filed its lawsuit. The school's site on Lafayette Street formerly housed Jefferson Intermediate School, which was moved to the location of the former Madison Elementary School north of Las Tunas Road.

In June 1994, the Los Angeles Superior Court ruled in favor of Alhambra, declaring that the 1992 election was unconstitutional because all the stakeholders had not been allowed to vote in the measure. However, on December 22, 1994, the 2nd District Court of Appeals overturned the previous ruling, declaring that San Gabriel Unified School District residents had a right to independently establish their own boundaries, citing California Board of Education approval. In January 1995, Alhambra School District dropped its case against Gabrielino High School, citing the money and time needed to pursue its goal of shutting down the high school.

On March 20, 1999, an arsonist set a US$2 million fire that destroyed 2 offices and 10 classrooms, effectively displacing 400 of the 1,400 students on campus.

On December 5, 2011, the San Gabriel Unified School District Board voted 3-2 not to renew the contract of Sharon Heinrich, the school's principal, for 2012–2013 school year, citing concerns about her leadership and supervisory abilities, against the opinion of Gabrielino alumni, students and faculty. On January 9, 2012, the Board reversed its previous decision, following the swearing-in of a new board and community outcry.

== Architecture ==
Gabrielino High School's distinct architecture incorporates cosmopolitan trends and styles. The school's exterior uses bold colors, including shades of orange and red. The campus is built on a 13.97 acres (0.0565 km^{2}) plot bounded by San Gabriel Boulevard to the west, Lafayette Street to the east, Wells Street to the north and Valley Boulevard to the south.

The current campus, built in 2002, is 197,974 square feet (18,392.4 m^{2}) and consists of administration offices, classroom buildings, a media center and library, a gymnasium, and a theatre.

== Socioeconomic characteristics ==
In the 2010–2011 school year, Gabrielino High served 1,808 students. 51.77% of students were male, while 48.2% were female.

Enrollment by grade in the 2010–2011 school year was:

Grade	9th	10th	11th	12th
Students	455	472	454	427

Student enrollment by ethnic group was:

Ethnicity	Native American	Asian / Pacific Islander	Black	Hispanic	White	Multiracial
Students	2	851	6	539	34	48

Gabrielino High School is classified as a Title I school, with 934 students (51.65%) of students eligible for free or reduced lunch.

== Extracurricular activities ==
=== Speech and Debate ===
As of the 2023-2024 school year, Gabrielino is the second top California Speech and Debate team & ranks #8 in the nation. It is the top public school California Speech and Debate team, as well as 26-year Southern California Debate League champions.

=== Mock Trial ===
Gabrielino defeated James Monroe High School to win the 2008 Los Angeles County championship.

=== Swimming ===
In December 2014, 17-year-old Sean Kim, ranked 7th in the state of California for both the 100 and 200 breaststroke events, making him the 37th nationally ranked recruit overall for the class of 2015.

=== Track and field ===
In March 2011, 16-year-old Kevin Chiao, a 110-meter hurdler, ranked among the top 50 in the state of California, making him the first Gabrielino student to do so.

=== Youth in Government ===
Since 1996, Gabrielino High School students have participated in a Youth in Government (YIG) program organized in collaboration with the City of San Gabriel's government.

=== Show Choir ===
In 2008, Cynthia Talavera became the Choral Director and led the Advanced Show Choir to its first Gold Win in 8 years at the Forum Music Festival at Fullerton College. In 2003 and 2013, Gabrielino Singers were accepted to sing at the traditional Candlelight Procession and Ceremony at Disneyland.

== Notable alumni ==
- Ken Gushi (Professional Drift Racer)
- Joanna Wang (Taiwanese singer) - attended until the age of 16; did not graduate.
