= MKHS =

MKHS may refer to:

- Mark Keppel High School, Alhambra, California, United States
- Morris Knolls High School, Morris County, New Jersey, United States
