= Alhambra High School (Alhambra, California) =

Location
- 101 South 2nd Street; Alhambra, California 91801; United States; 34°05′34″N 118°07′42″W

Information
- Type: Public
- Opened: 1898
- School district: Alhambra Unified School District (2004–); Alhambra Union High School District (1898–2004)
- Principal: Diana Diaz-Ferguson
- Teaching staff: 95.86 (FTE)
- Grades: 9–12
- Enrollment: 2,100 (2023-2024)
- Student to teacher ratio: 21.91
- Colors: Blue and gold
- Athletics conference: CIF Southern Section; Almont League
- Nickname: Moors
- Rival: Mark Keppel High School
- Newspaper: The Moor Weekly
- Yearbook: The Alhambran
- Website: School website

The front Entrance of Alhambra High School, October 2026.

Alhambra High School (AHS) is a public high school in Alhambra, California established in 1898. It is a part of the Alhambra Unified School District.

The school is located on Second Street, across the street from City Hall and the Police Department, bounded by Second Street, Commonwealth Avenue, Fifth Street, and Main Street. The campus is divided into three parts, by Third and Fourth Streets.

Alhambra High School has been accredited by the Western Association of Schools and Colleges—for the first time in 1965 and most recently in 2024, for a fixed term after each evaluation.

== Present ==
As of January 2015, enrollment at AHS is about 2,700 students, In this ethnically-mixed school district, the high school is one of the three comprehensive high schools. Curriculum offerings encompass Reading for remedial instruction, to Advanced Placement courses in six subjects, including English composition, calculus, environmental science, physics, American government, United States history, world history, art history, Spanish, Chinese, Japanese, and Psychology.

== History ==
Around 1884, Alhambra citizens saw the need for their own school.

On October 11, 2006, a small explosive device was found on a sidewalk bordering the north end of campus. Hours later, a second similar device was found in a trash can on the south end of campus. The Los Angeles County sheriff's bomb squad safely removed and disabled both items, and the campus was searched.

In early 2007, the school was featured on the third season of Hell's Kitchen. 100 members from the senior class of 2007 were invited to participate. Each chef had to prepare 100 portions of a dish for each of the students. It was one of a select few public high schools in California to be awarded a distinguished Great Schools Rating of 8 out of 10.

== Music ==
The marching band was selected to march in the 2009 Pasadena Tournament of Roses Parade, the first time a band from Alhambra has been in the parade in 40 years. In 2020, they performed again in the Rose Parade, as part of a band including members from Mark Keppel High School and San Gabriel High School.

== Controversy ==
In April 2005, an article was published by The Moor, the school's biweekly newspaper, titled "Latinos Lag Behind in Academics". It discussed that Hispanic students' test scores have improved, then asked why Asian scores were noticeably higher, postulating that Asian students worked harder in academics than Hispanic students, suggesting the latter were "not pulling their weight". The Los Angeles Times discussed the achievement gap in context, noting the outrage and charges of racism towards the student author and the Latino pride response.

== Notable alumni ==
- Duane Allen (1937–2003), professional football player
- H. George Anderson, presiding Bishop, Evangelical Lutheran Church in America
- Bob Boyd, former college basketball player and coach for the University of Southern California
- Leo Carroll, NFL football player
- Kevin Cheng, Hong Kong actor
- Dean Cundey, director of photography
- Clive Cussler, novelist
- John C. England, US Navy officer who was killed during the Japanese attack on Pearl Harbor in 1941
- Stan Freberg, voice actor and television personality
- Grant Gershon, music director, Los Angeles Master Chorale
- Hardie Gramatky, watercolorist
- Sam Hanks, alumnus 1933, winner of the 1957 Indianapolis 500 and inducted into the Indianapolis Motor Speedway Hall of Fame in 1981.
- Derek Hartley, co-host of the Derek and Romaine Show on Sirius XM Satellite Radio
- Darrall Imhoff, NBA player and Olympic gold medalist
- James Jannard, businessman
- Ke Huy Quan, Vietnamese-American actor, most known for films such as The Goonies (1985) and Everything Everywhere All At Once (2022).
- Michelle Johnson (actress)
- Ralph Kiner, former Major League baseball player and broadcaster, MLB Hall of Fame member
- Aaron Krach, novelist, artist, magazine editor
- Dan Larson, professional baseball player (Houston Astros, Philadelphia Phillies, Chicago Cubs)
- Lynne Latham, dancer, actress and designer who featured on The Dean Martin Show and Xanadu.
- John W. Olmsted (1915): Professor Emeritus at University of California, Riverside
- Noé Ramirez, Major League Baseball pitcher for the Boston Red Sox and Los Angeles Angels
- Jenny Oropeza, 1975, politician California State Senate, California State Assembly
- Dorothy Howell Rodham, mother of Secretary of State Hillary Clinton
- Lewis Sargentich, legal scholar at Harvard Law School
- Tex Schramm, former general manager of the Dallas Cowboys (NFL)
- Cheryl Tiegs, model
- Mickey Thompson, race car driver
- Jim Tunney, football official, author, motivational speaker
- Martin Vasquez, soccer player and coach
- Dick Wallen, UCLA football All-American, recipient of the 1957 W.J. Voit Memorial Trophy
- Max West, professional baseball player
- Verne Winchell, businessman
- Mike Woo, politician, Class of 1969
- Lisa Yee, children's author and winner of the Sid Fleischman Humor Award
