= John Tran =

American politician (born 1975)

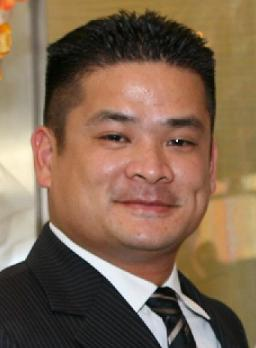

Member of the Rosemead City Council
- In office 2005–2009
- Preceded by: John Nunez
- Succeeded by: Margaret Clark

Personal details
- Born: November 20, 1975 (age 50) Saigon, South Vietnam
- Party: Democratic
- Children: 4
- Profession: Real estate agent

John Tran (Vietnamese: Trần Diệc Tuyền; born November 20, 1975) is an American former politician who served on the Rosemead, California city council.

== Early and personal life ==
John Tran was born in Saigon, Southern Vietnam on November 20, 1975, the fourth of six children. Sponsored by an American family, Tran and his family left Communist controlled Vietnam in 1979, immigrating to the United States and settling originally in Oklahoma. After moving to Arizona, the Tran family next moved to Monterey Park, California when Tran was 10 years old. They later settled in Rosemead, California. Tran attended school in the Garvey School District during his elementary and middle school years, graduating from Garvey Intermediate School. In 1993, Tran graduated from Mark Keppel High School in the Alhambra High School District.

Upon graduation from high school, Tran married his first wife, an American citizen. When Tran turned 18 years old, he became a naturalized United States citizen. Tran is the father of two sons, Andre Tran and Joshua Tran, from his first marriage and two children with his current wife. He has lived in Rosemead for over 19 years.

== Career and public service ==
Tran started his public service career as a member of the Garvey School District Board of Education in 1999. At age 23, Tran was the youngest member to be elected to the board; he later served as Garvey's school board president in 2002.

During the time he served the Garvey School District, Tran assisted in setting high expectations for district administrators and staff and was involved in the development and approval of two joint-use agreements with the City of Rosemead to build two gymnasiums to be placed on each of the district's two intermediate school campuses. While serving on the Garvey School Board, Tran also served on the board of directors of the California Latino School Board Members Association and was a member of the California School Board Association. While chairperson of the Garvey School District bond committee, Tran participated in coordinating the work of the staff and community to facilitate the passing of General Obligation Bond Q; a 30 million-dollar bond initiative to benefit the students of the Garvey School District by continuing modernization of the district's school campuses.

Following his school board service, Tran was elected to the Rosemead city council in March, 2005 - serving only one term. Tran is the first Asian-American elected to the council. As with many cities in the state of California, the Rosemead city council rotates its members into the mayor’s position; Tran was appointed mayor of Rosemead in March, 2007. Running for re-election to the city council in March 2009, Tran lost the bid by only one vote to newcomer Sandra Armenta.

On November 3, 2009, Tran contested and won the seat of a two-term incumbent on The El Monte Union High School District School Board. Tran announced his candidacy for the California State Assembly's 49th district seat, vacated by termed out Assemblyman Mike Eng, in August 2011. On February 3, 2012, Tran resigned his position as governing board member for the El Monte Union High School District, and withdrew his candidacy for the 49th district assembly seat.

== Corruption Charge by the FBI ==
The corruption case against Tran was investigated by the Federal Bureau of Investigation. On February 3, 2012, a plea agreement was made public where Tran pleaded guilty to one charge of public corruption. The plea bargain revealed that Tran extorted more than $10,000 in cash payments from a developer while Tran was a member and Mayor of the Rosemead city council. In exchange for Tran's plea, prosecutors did not pursue obstruction of justice and extortion charges. Under the plea, Tran faced up to 10 years in prison and $250,000 in fines. His attorney has filed a request to delay the sentencing so that he could file a motion to withdraw the guilty plea. and request a jury trial.

The FBI has charged, that Tammy Gong, a property developer made a series of payments to Tran, who first sought out the developer while meeting at Rosemead City Hall. The developer made cash payments totaling $7,000 in 2005 and 2006, and the developer’s business partner wrote a $3,200 check to Tran in 2007. In November, 2012 federal prosecutors alleged that former Rosemead Mayor John Tran sought these payoffs in order to support his addiction to gambling. He also "solicited sexual favors" from a female land developer "while the victim had business pending before the city of Rosemead." Tran also attempted to derail federal prosecution by turning in other corrupt politicians The allegations were part of the prosecutors' latest court filing to fight Tran's request to withdraw his earlier guilty plea in a federal bribery case against him.

== Post Prison Comeback ==
Tran served 15 months of his prison term, when he was released in 2015. Tran attempted to run for public office in November 2018 to replacing outgoing councilman Bill Alarcon. His application was denied due to his felony conviction.
