= Los Angeles City College =

Community college in California, US

- Former names: Los Angeles Junior College (1929–1938)
- Type: Public community college
- Established: 1929
- Parent institution: Los Angeles Community College District
- President: Amanuel Gebru
- Students: 17,250 (Fall 2019)
- Location: Los Angeles, California, United States; 34°05′13.29″N 118°17′34.44″W
- Campus: Large city 49 acres (0.20 km^{2})
- Colors: Red and blue
- Nickname: Cubs
- Website: lacitycollege.edu

Los Angeles City College (LACC) is a public community college in Los Angeles, California, United States. It is part of the Los Angeles Community College District, and serves Hollywood and its surrounding neighborhoods. It is located on Vermont Avenue south of Santa Monica Boulevard on the former campus of the University of California, Los Angeles (UCLA) in East Hollywood. From 1947 to 1955, the college shared its campus with California State University, Los Angeles (Cal State LA), then known as Los Angeles State College of Applied Arts and Sciences (LASCAAS), before the university moved to its present campus of 175 acres (71 ha) in the northeastern section of the City of Los Angeles, 5 miles (8 km) east of the Civic Center.

== History ==
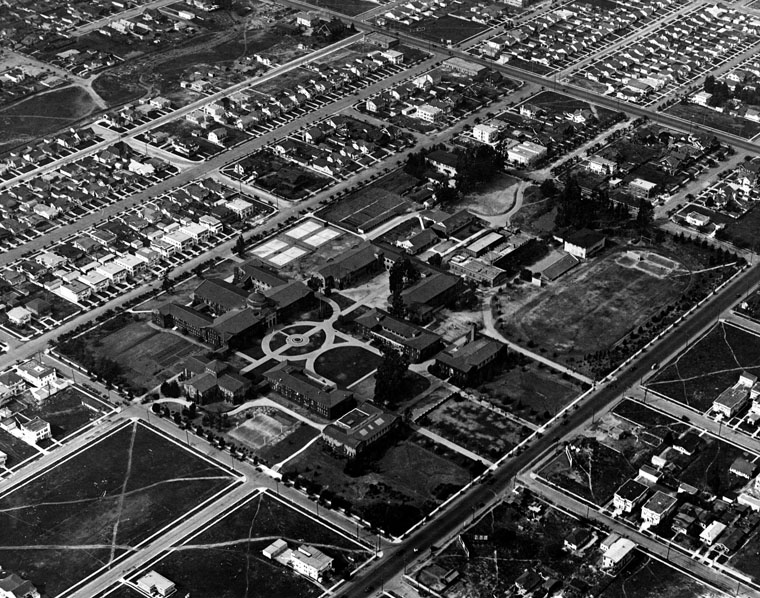
LACC campus, c.1922, after UCLA relocated to Sawtelle (Westwood)

The LACC campus was originally a farm outside Los Angeles, owned by Dennis Sullivan. It is one of nine separate college campuses of the Los Angeles Community College District. When the Pacific Electric Interurban Railroad connected downtown Los Angeles and Hollywood in 1909, the area began to develop rapidly. In 1914, the LA Board of Education moved the teachers' Normal School to the site. The Italian Romanesque campus became the original campus of the University of California, Los Angeles (UCLA) in 1919. In need of more space, UCLA moved to its present location in Westwood in 1929. On September 9, 1929, the campus opened its doors as Los Angeles Junior College with over 1,300 students and 54 teachers. The campus changed its name to Los Angeles City College in 1938.

The California State University, Los Angeles (Cal State LA) was founded on July 2, 1947 by an act of the California legislature and opened for classes as Los Angeles State College (LASC) on the campus of Los Angeles City College. As president of LACC, P. Victor Peterson also became the acting president of the state college.

In 1949, when Howard S. McDonald became president of both Los Angeles State College and Los Angeles City College, they were housed in borrowed spaces with part-time faculty. He hired administrators to help him formally organize the colleges, then found a site within Los Angeles city limits for a permanent campus for Cal State LA. The Los Angeles Board of Education then bought the LACC site for $700,000.

In 2009, the school shut down its entire athletics program. By that point, it was only fielding teams in men's and women's basketball, women's volleyball and women's badminton.

The in-state tuition and fees for 2017–2018 were $1,220, and out-of-state tuition and fees were $7,538. There is no application fee. The school utilizes a semester-based academic year. The student-faculty ratio is 23-to-1. Total enrollment was 13,827 of which 3,999 were full-time students and 9,828 were part time students.

In December 2019, the school decided to reinstate its athletics program and, after a delay caused by the COVID-19 pandemic, on August 27, 2021, the Los Angeles City Cubs, then a member of the South Coast Conference, played their first intercollegiate sporting event since 2009.

Student body composition as of 2022
Race and ethnicity	Total
Hispanic	54%
White	18%
Asian	12%
Black	7%
Unknown	4%
Two or more races (Note: Other consists of Multiracial Americans & those who prefer to not say.)	3%
Foreign national	2%
Gender distribution
Male	39%
Female	61%
Age distribution
Under 18	12%
18–24	40%
25–64	47%
Over 65	1%

Fall demographics of student body
Ethnic breakdown	2018	2017
Hispanic and Latino American	57%	56%
African American	6%	7%
Asian American	9%	11%
Native Hawaiian or other Pacific Islander	1%	1%
White	13%	15%
Multiracial Americans	2%	2%
International students	3%	4%
Unknown	10%	6%
Female	58%	56%
Male	42%	44%

== Gallery ==
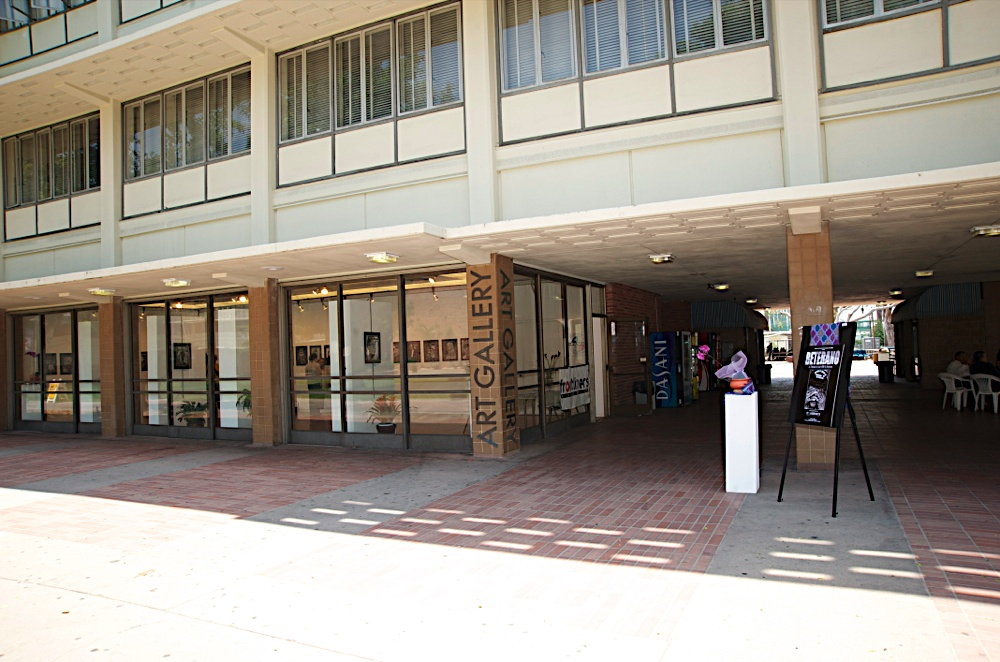
Da Vinci Hall

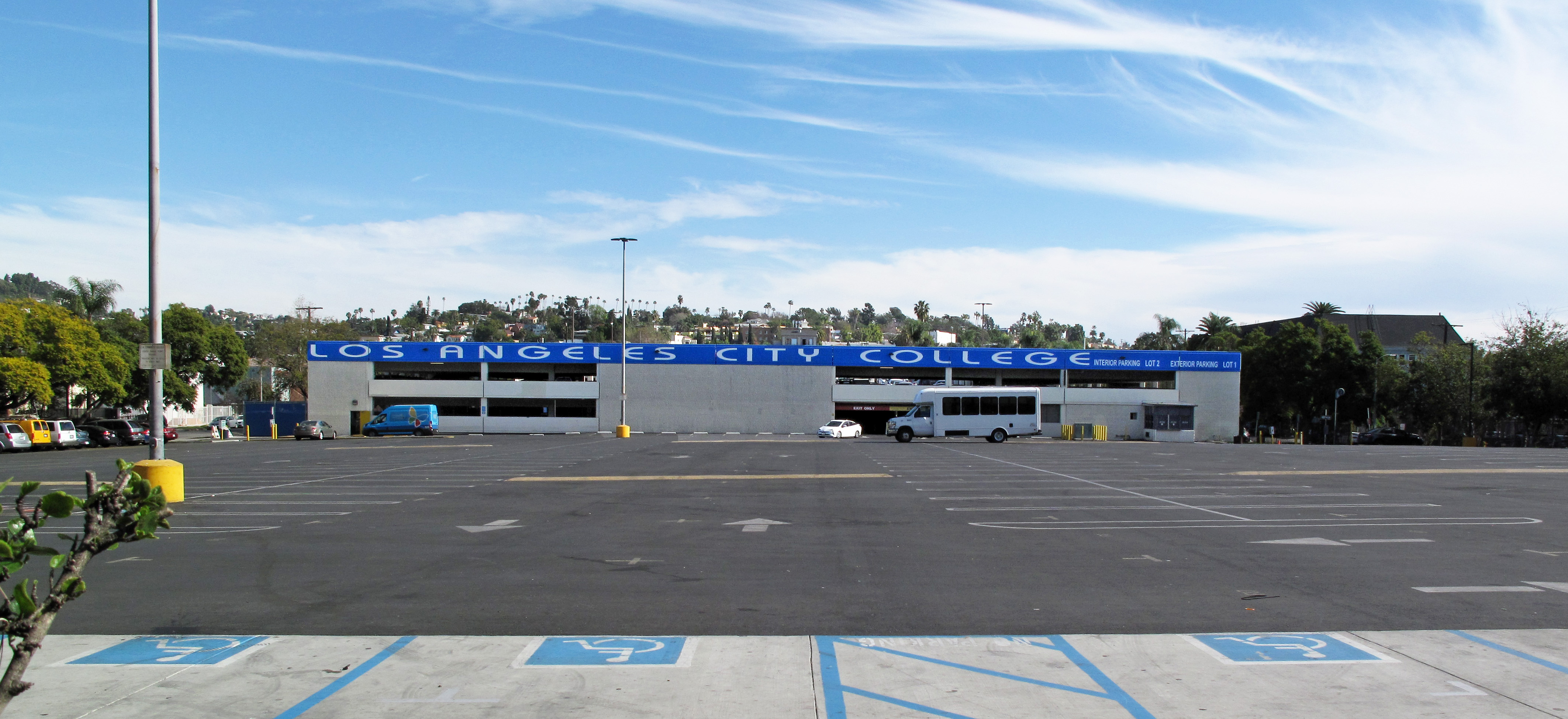
LACC Parking Lot

== See also ==
- California Community Colleges System
