= Little Toot =

1939 children's picture book written and illustrated by Hardie Gramatky

- Author: Hardie Gramatky
- Illustrator: Hardie Gramatky
- Cover artist: Hardie Gramatky
- Language: English
- Genre: Picture book
- Published: 1939
- Publisher: G. P. Putnam's Sons
- Publication place: USA
- Media type: Print (hardback)
- Pages: 93 (unpaginated)
- OCLC: 180329

Little Toot is a 1939 children's picture book written and illustrated by Hardie Gramatky. It features Little Toot, a small young tugboat in New York Harbor who does not want to tug. Instead, he would rather play, making figure eights in the harbor and thus being a nuisance to all the other tugboats. But when he ends up all alone on the open ocean as a storm is rolling in, it is up to him to save a grounded ocean liner.

== Publication history ==
- 1939, USA, G. P. Putnam's Sons OCLC 180329 (93 unpaginated pages)
- 2007, USA, G. P. Putnam's Sons ISBN 9780399247132 (86 unpaginated pages)

The book (G. P. Putnam's Sons first children's book) has been continually in print since 1939. In 2007, in honor of what would have been Gramatky's 100th birthday, Penguin Putnam publishers rescanned the original artwork, added nine original full-color sketches by the illustrator, and brought back detailed endpapers so the book has been restored to its first-edition colors and vibrancy.

== Reception ==
Kirkus Reviews gave Little Toot a starred review, it won the 1969 Lewis Carroll Shelf Award, and is a Library of Congress classic in children's literature.

Daniel Pinkwater and Scott Simon read and raved about the 2007 restored classic edition ("Hardie Gramatky never speaks down to children") on NPR's Weekend Edition in October 2007.

== Legacy ==
The story appeared in an animated segment of Walt Disney's 1948 film Melody Time; the story was sung by the Andrews Sisters, with Vic Schoen providing the background musical score. In this version, Little Toot disgraces his father Big Toot by recklessly (albeit unintentionally) causing an ocean liner - the one Big Toot was towing out to sea - to run aground and crash into skyscrapers in Manhattan. Little Toot is banished from the harbor and into the 12 mi (19 km) limit as a result. In exile, Little Toot realizes that he must "grow up" - in other words, give up his careless ways - in order to earn respect from the other boats...including Big Toot, who has been stuck towing garbage scows ever since that incident with the ocean liner. Then Little Toot gets his chance: another ocean liner gets stuck on 2 rocks, beyond the 12-mile limit; since Big Toot and the police boats are bottled up in the harbor by a storm, Little Toot must single-handedly rescue the grounded ocean liner...which he does. And incidentally it made Big Toot very proud of him too. This version was also adapted into comic strip form in two issues of Walt Disney's Comics and Stories in September and October 1948.

When Capitol Records produced a record with the Disney Little Toot song, it was the first children's record to hit the 1,000,000 sales mark on Billboard, according to then-president Alan Livingston.

An animated adaptation of Little Toot and the Loch Ness Monster was featured in Shelley Duvall's Bedtime Stories with Rick Moranis as its narrator.

There was also another movie based on Little Toot called The New Adventures of Little Toot. It featured Samuel Vincent as the voice of the title character and was released on home video in 1992 by Strand Home Video.

== Little Toot series titles ==
- Little Toot (1939)
- Little Toot on the Thames (1964)
- Little Toot on the Grand Canal (1968)
- Little Toot on the Mississippi (1973)
- Little Toot Through the Golden Gate (1975)
- Little Toot and the Loch Ness Monster (1989, completed posthumously by Gramatky's wife and daughter)
- Little Toot and the Lighthouse (1999)
