= Mark Keppel =

Former County Superintendent of Schools of Los Angeles County

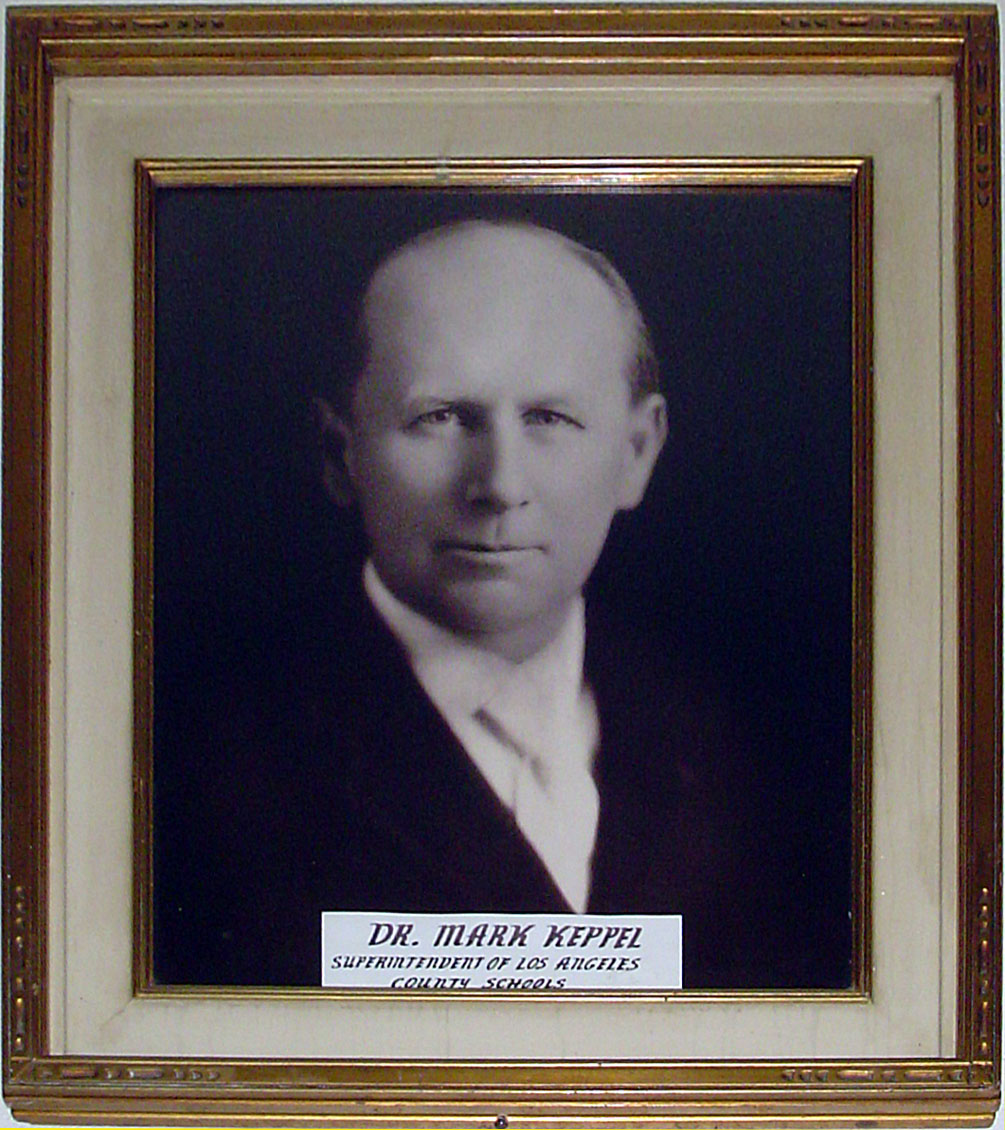
Mark Keppel

Mark Keppel served as County Superintendent of Schools of Los Angeles County from 1902 to 1928.

== Life and Times ==
Born on April 11, 1867, in Butte County, California, Mark Keppel grew up in a very strict religious pioneer family. Keppel completed his education at San Joaquin College, (originally Woodbridge Academy), and after receiving his Ph.D. Degree, he taught in Dunnigan, California.

Keppel married his wife, Mae Hubbard, in 1894. Four years later, the couple moved to Los Angeles where Keppel taught at the School of Los Angeles. After a few years of teaching, Dr. Keppel was elected Superintendent of L.A. County Schools.

Mark Keppel died on June 16, 1928.

== Career as Superintendent ==
Keppel was elected to the position of County Superintendent of Schools of Los Angeles County in 1902, 1906, and again in 1910. In 1914, the office came under Civil Service, and Keppel held it until his death.

== Legacy ==
There are currently one school district and three schools named after Mark Keppel. These are:

- Keppel Union Elementary, a school district based at 34004 128th St. East, Pearblossom, CA, serving the five communities of Littlerock, Pearblossom, Sun Village, Lake Los Angeles, Llano as well as neighboring areas.
- Mark Keppel High School, a California Distinguished High School located at 501 E. Hellman Ave., Alhambra, CA.
- Mark Keppel Elementary School, a K-5 school located at 6630 East Mark Keppel St., Paramount, CA.
- Mark Keppel Elementary School, a K-5 school located at 730 Glenwood Rd., Glendale, CA.
