= Dick Frey =

American football player (1929–2020)

No. 66, 62
- Position: Defensive end

Personal information
- Born: December 17, 1929; Englewood, New Jersey, U.S.
- Died: April 25, 2020 (aged 90); Tomball, Texas, U.S.
- Listed height: 6 ft 2 in (1.88 m)
- Listed weight: 235 lb (107 kg)

Career information
- High school: Mark Keppel
- College: Texas A&M

Career history
- Dallas Texans (1960); Houston Oilers (1961)

Awards and highlights
- AFL champion (1961)
- Stats at Pro Football Reference

Richard H. Frey (December 17, 1929 – April 25, 2020) was an American football end who played for the Dallas Texans and Houston Oilers. He played college football at Texas A&M University, having previously attended Mark Keppel High School. He died in April 2020.
