= Garvey School District =

School district in California

Address
- 2730 North Del Mar Avenue Rosemead, California, 91770; United States

District information
- Type: Public
- Grades: K–8
- NCES District ID: 0614940

Students and staff
- Students: 4,431 (2020–2021)
- Teachers: 189.02 (FTE)
- Staff: 272.21 (FTE)
- Student–teacher ratio: 23.44:1

Other information
- Website: www.garvey.k12.ca.us

Garvey School District (founded in 1891) is a pre-K-8 school district with headquarters located in the city of Rosemead, California. It operates nine pre-K-6 elementary schools, one pre-K-8 elementary school and two intermediate schools (grades 7-8). The district serves more than 6000 students from diverse backgrounds, predominantly Asian and Latin American.

In addition to serving most of the southern portions of the city of Rosemead, the Garvey School District serves parts of the cities of Monterey Park and San Gabriel, as well as part of the unincorporated Los Angeles County community of South San Gabriel. Monterey Vista and Hillcrest Elementary schools are located in the city of Monterey Park, while Dewey Avenue Elementary school is located in the city of San Gabriel. All other schools in the district are located in the city of Rosemead.

Students from the Garvey School District feed into the high schools of the Alhambra Unified School District, primarily to San Gabriel High School, but also to Mark Keppel High School.

Enrollment in the Garvey School District has been in decline for several years. As a result, several elementary schools have closed.

== History ==
Circa 1985 the Garvey school district the site chosen for a new Rosemead high school by the Alhambra Union High School District.

== Schools ==
=== Pre-K-6 schools ===
- Arlene Bitley Elementary School, Rosemead
- Dewey Avenue Elementary School, San Gabriel
- Ralph Waldo Emerson Elementary School, Rosemead
- Hillcrest Elementary School, Monterey Park
- Monterey Vista Elementary School, Monterey Park
- Eldridge Rice Elementary School, Rosemead
- George I. Sanchez Elementary School, Rosemead
- Willard Elementary School, Rosemead

=== Intermediate schools ===
- Roger W. Temple Intermediate School, Rosemead
- Richard Garvey Intermediate School, Rosemead

=== Former schools ===
- Dan T. Williams Elementary School, Rosemead. Since the fall of 2006, the district has had an arrangement with the Los Angeles Community College District allowing East Los Angeles College, which has had increasing enrollment resulting in a shortage of classroom space in recent years, to use the Williams School, a 17-room school, as a satellite campus.
- Margaret Duff Elementary School, Rosemead, closed on June 16, 2008 due to a vote in favor to close on May 15 of that year
- John Marshall Elementary School, San Gabriel, closed after the 2010-2011 school year due to a vote in favor to close after that year. It would soon become a community park which will start construction on early 2013.
