= Duane Allen (American football) =

American football player (1937–2003)

No. 25, 85, 82
- Position: Tight end

Personal information
- Born: October 21, 1937; Alhambra, California, U.S.
- Died: May 7, 2003 (aged 65); Pasadena, California, U.S.
- Listed height: 6 ft 4 in (1.93 m)
- Listed weight: 225 lb (102 kg)

Career information
- High school: Alhambra
- College: Mt. San Antonio (1956); Santa Ana (1960)
- NFL draft: 1961: 9th round, 116th overall pick
- AFL draft: 1962: 33rd round, 258th overall pick

Career history

Playing
- Los Angeles Rams (1961–1964); Pittsburgh Steelers (1965); Baltimore Colts (1966)*; Chicago Bears (1966–1967); Atlanta Falcons (1968)*; Las Vegas Cowboys (1968)
- * Offseason or practice squad member only

Coaching
- Las Vegas Cowboys (1968) Assistant/Head coach

Career NFL statistics
- Receptions: 10
- Receiving yards: 227
- Touchdowns: 5
- Stats at Pro Football Reference

Duane Douglas Allen (October 21, 1937 – May 7, 2003) was an American professional football tight end in the National Football League (NFL). He was the Santa Ana College's Athlete of the Year and the Eastern Conference Lineman of the Year. He was selected by the Los Angeles Rams in the ninth round of the 1961 NFL draft.

== Biography ==
=== Early life ===
Duane Allen was born in Alhambra, California on October 21, 1937. He attended Alhambra High School, where he earned All-Southern California prep football honors. Allen did not play football at a four-year college but was twice a Junior College All-American while attending Mt. San Antonio College in 1956 and Santa Ana College in 1960. While at Santa Ana College Allen majored in police science.

=== Professional career ===
Allen was selected by the Los Angeles Rams in the ninth round of the 1961 NFL draft. He was also courted by the San Diego Chargers of the rival American Football League (AFL). He was originally slated to play defensive back at the time of his entry into the league, but due to his size and speed he impressed as an offensive receiver at the Rams' 1961 training camp and was switched to that position. Little used during his rookie campaign, Allen did catch two passes for 80 yards and two touchdowns in 1961.

Allen's sophomore campaign with the Rams in 1962 would be a brief one, catching a touchdown against the San Francisco 49ers on October 28 before being forced to leave the game with a season-ending knee injury.

Allen ultimately spent seven years in the NFL playing for the Los Angeles Rams (1961–64), Pittsburgh Steelers (1965), and Chicago Bears (1966–67).

=== Life after professional football ===
Following his retirement from the National Football League, Allen coached high school football and track and served as head coach of the Las Vegas Cowboys of the short-lived Continental Football League (COFL).

Off the field Allen was an accomplished pianist and composer. He appeared in the 1975 Richard Fleischer movie, Mandingo, as "Topaze."

Allen was elected to the Santa Ana Dons Hall of Fame in 2003.

He died at Huntington Memorial Hospital in Pasadena after having suffered a stroke on May 7, 2003.
