= San Gabriel Unified School District =

School district in California

Coordinates: 34.0976°N 118.1049°W

Address
- 408 Junipero Serra Drive San Gabriel, California, 91776; United States

District information
- Type: Public
- Grades: K–12
- NCES District ID: 0634425

Students and staff
- Students: 4,806 (2020–2021)
- Teachers: 208.44 (FTE)
- Staff: 258.48 (FTE)
- Student–teacher ratio: 23.06:1

Other information
- Website: www.sgusd.k12.ca.us

San Gabriel Unified School District, also known as SGUSD, is a public school district that serves the community of San Gabriel, California. It is located in the San Gabriel Valley area. SGUSD separated itself from the Alhambra Unified School District. This is a rather small district which has only one middle school and one high school. Del Mar High is a continuation school which provides service to the students who have discipline and/or grade problems or are behind credits to graduation.

The district includes most of San Gabriel as well as sections of Rosemead, East San Gabriel, and Temple City.

== History ==
In September 1994, with the opening of Gabrielino High School, SGUSD underwent a major restructuring, with Jefferson Middle School including the 6th to 8th grades (instead of the 7th to 9th) and Gabrielino High School taking the responsibility of the 9th graders.

== Board of education ==
San Gabriel Unified School District's board of education is composed of five members, elected at-large to a four-year term. Starting with the November 2018 elections, it will be held on a first Tuesday after the first Monday in November of even-numbered years to coincide with the Los Angeles County, California and federal general elections.

== Schools ==
SGUSD operates one high school, one middle school, and five elementary schools.

=== High schools ===
- Gabrielino High School
- Del Mar High School

=== Middle schools ===
- Jefferson Middle School

=== Elementary schools ===
- McKinley Elementary School
- Coolidge Elementary School
- Wilson Elementary School
- Washington Elementary School
- Roosevelt Elementary School
