= Alhambra School District =

Defunct school district in California, United States

Alhambra School District was a K-8 school district headquartered in the Scanlon Center in Alhambra, California, United States.

== History ==
In January 1886, the citizens of Alhambra withdrew from the San Gabriel School District and formed the Alhambra School District. During the spring semester, classes were held in the second floor of a livery stable on a corner of what today would be 300 South Chapel Avenue.

On June 12, 1886, the Alhambra School District purchased the land for its first school from John and Ellen Conner for the price of “...one thousand (1,000) dollars gold coin...”. Garfield School opened its doors to students, grades 1–9, on September 15, 1886, and the first commencement was held June 14, 1889, with five pupils receiving diplomas.

The need for schools grew with the population, and the communities approved bonds to provide these schools. This and continued through the completion of Monterey Highlands School in 1965.

In 1997 the district had overcrowding, and so it announced it wished to enact a bond program if voters approved such in a November 1998 referendum.

In 2004 it merged with the Alhambra High School District to form the Alhambra Unified School District.
