= South San Gabriel, California =

- Census-designated place
- South San Gabriel welcome sign

- Location of South San Gabriel in Los Angeles County, California.

- Location of South San Gabriel in Los Angeles County, California Location of South San Gabriel in California Location of South San Gabriel in the USA
- Coordinates: 34°2′57″N 118°5′43″W
- Country: United States
- State: California
- County: Los Angeles

Area
  - Total: 0.834 sq mi (2.161 km^{2})
  - Land: 0.834 sq mi (2.160 km^{2})
  - Water: 0.00039 sq mi (0.001 km^{2}) 0.03%
- Elevation: 272 ft (83 m)

Population (2020)
  - Total: 7,920
  - Density: 9,500/sq mi (3,670/km^{2})
- Time zone: UTC-8 (PST)
  - Summer (DST): UTC-7 (PDT)
- ZIP code: 91770
- Area code: 626
- FIPS code: 06-73276
- GNIS feature ID: 1652796

South San Gabriel is a census-designated place (CDP) in the San Gabriel Valley of Los Angeles County, California, United States. The population was 7,920 at the 2020 census, down from 8,070 at the 2010 census.

== Geography ==
South San Gabriel is located at 34°2′57″N 118°5′43″W (34.049060, -118.095150).

According to the United States Census Bureau, the CDP has a total area of 0.8 square miles (2.2 km^{2}), over 99% of which is land.

== Demographics ==
Historical population
Census	Pop.	Note	%±
1970	5,051		—
1980	5,421		7.3%
1990	7,700		42.0%
2000	7,595		−1.4%
2010	8,070		6.3%
2020	7,920		−1.9%
U.S. Decennial Census; 1860–1870 1880-1890; 1900 1910 1920; 1930 1940 1950; 1960 1970 1980; 1990 2000 2010; 2020

South San Gabriel first appeared as an unincorporated place in the 1970 U.S. census; and as a census designated place in the 1980 United States census. Prior to 1970, it was included in the unincorporated area of the Southwest San Gabriel Valley census county division (1960 pop. 205,950).

=== Racial and ethnic composition ===
South San Gabriel CDP, California – Racial and ethnic composition Note: the US Census treats Hispanic/Latino as an ethnic category. This table excludes Latinos from the racial categories and assigns them to a separate category. Hispanics/Latinos may be of any race.
Race / Ethnicity (NH = Non-Hispanic)	Pop 2000	Pop 2010	Pop 2020	% 2000	% 2010	% 2020
White alone (NH)	644	451	362	8.48%	5.59%	4.57%
Black or African American alone (NH)	25	74	64	0.33%	0.92%	0.81%
Native American or Alaska Native alone (NH)	25	17	6	0.33%	0.21%	0.08%
Asian alone (NH)	3,272	3,974	4,542	43.08%	49.24%	57.35%
Native Hawaiian or Pacific Islander alone (NH)	14	1	7	0.18%	0.01%	0.09%
Other race alone (NH)	9	3	17	0.12%	0.04%	0.21%
Mixed race or Multiracial (NH)	115	106	76	1.51%	1.31%	0.96%
Hispanic or Latino (any race)	3,491	3,444	2,846	45.96%	42.68%	35.93%
Total	7,595	8,070	7,920	100.00%	100.00%	100.00%

=== 2020 census ===
As of the 2020 census, South San Gabriel had a population of 7,920. The population density was 9,496.4 inhabitants per square mile (3,666.6/km^{2}). The age distribution was 16.5% under the age of 18, 8.2% aged 18 to 24, 25.3% aged 25 to 44, 28.2% aged 45 to 64, and 21.8% aged 65 or older. The median age was 45.0 years. For every 100 females, there were 95.1 males, and for every 100 females age 18 and over there were 92.6 males age 18 and over.

The census reported that 97.3% of the population lived in households, 0.3% lived in non-institutionalized group quarters, and 2.4% were institutionalized. 100.0% of residents lived in urban areas, while 0.0% lived in rural areas.

There were 2,340 households, of which 30.6% had children under the age of 18 living in them. Of all households, 50.4% were married-couple households, 4.9% were cohabiting couple households, 27.6% had a female householder with no spouse or partner present, and 17.1% had a male householder with no spouse or partner present. About 14.7% of all households were one-person households, and 8.1% had someone living alone who was 65 years of age or older. The average household size was 3.29. There were 1,884 families (80.5% of all households).

There were 2,423 housing units at an average density of 2,905.3 units per square mile (1,121.7 units/km^{2}), of which 2,340 (96.6%) were occupied. Of occupied units, 67.1% were owner-occupied and 32.9% were occupied by renters. The homeowner vacancy rate was 0.4% and the rental vacancy rate was 1.3%.

=== Income and poverty ===
In 2023, the US Census Bureau estimated that the median household income was $76,921, and the per capita income was $27,931. About 4.3% of families and 5.4% of the population were below the poverty line.

=== 2010 census ===
At the 2010 census South San Gabriel had a population of 8,070. The population density was 9,684.6 inhabitants per square mile (3,739.2/km^{2}). The racial makeup of South San Gabriel was 2,198 (27.2%) White (5.6% Non-Hispanic White), 83 (1.0%) African American, 56 (0.7%) Native American, 3,990 (49.4%) Asian, 4 (0.0%) Pacific Islander, 1,427 (17.7%) from other races, and 312 (3.9%) from two or more races. Hispanic or Latino of any race were 3,444 persons (42.7%).

The census reported that 7,834 people (97.1% of the population) lived in households, 7 (0.1%) lived in non-institutionalized group quarters, and 229 (2.8%) were institutionalized.

There were 2,249 households, 874 (38.9%) had children under the age of 18 living in them, 1,249 (55.5%) were opposite-sex married couples living together, 393 (17.5%) had a female householder with no husband present, 211 (9.4%) had a male householder with no wife present. There were 96 (4.3%) unmarried opposite-sex partnerships, and 15 (0.7%) same-sex married couples or partnerships. 308 households (13.7%) were one person and 150 (6.7%) had someone living alone who was 65 or older. The average household size was 3.48. There were 1,853 families (82.4% of households); the average family size was 3.76.

The age distribution was 1,648 people (20.4%) under the age of 18, 737 people (9.1%) aged 18 to 24, 2,108 people (26.1%) aged 25 to 44, 2,225 people (27.6%) aged 45 to 64, and 1,352 people (16.8%) who were 65 or older. The median age was 40.5 years. For every 100 females, there were 92.9 males. For every 100 females age 18 and over, there were 90.0 males.

There were 2,353 housing units at an average density of 2,823.8 per square mile, of the occupied units 1,597 (71.0%) were owner-occupied and 652 (29.0%) were rented. The homeowner vacancy rate was 1.1%; the rental vacancy rate was 4.8%. 5,545 people (68.7% of the population) lived in owner-occupied housing units and 2,289 people (28.4%) lived in rental housing units.

== Education ==
South San Gabriel is served by Montebello Unified School District, Garvey School District, and Alhambra Unified School District. The local area is divided among the three school districts.

Public schools that are zoned to serve South San Gabriel include:

- Hillcrest Elementary, in Monterey Park
- Macy Intermediate School, in Monterey Park
- Mark Keppel High School, in Alhambra
- Potrero Heights Elementary School, in unincorporated Los Angeles County
- San Gabriel High School, in San Gabriel
- Schurr High School, in Montebello

== Politics ==
In the state legislature, South San Gabriel is located in the 25th senatorial district, represented by Democrat Sasha Renée Pérez, and in the 49th Assembly district, represented by Democrat Mike Fong. Federally, South San Gabriel is located in California's 28th congressional district, represented by Democrat Judy Chu.

The Los Angeles County Sheriff's Department (LASD) operates the Temple Station in Temple City, serving South San Gabriel.
