= Mark Keppel High School =

Location
- 501 East Hellman Avenue; Alhambra, California 91801; United States; 34°04′12″N 118°06′59″W

Information
- Type: Public Secondary
- Opened: February 5, 1940; 86 years ago
- Principal: Alejandra Perez
- Teaching staff: 81.91 (FTE)
- Grades: 9–12
- Enrollment: 2,178 (2023-2024)
- Student to teacher ratio: 26.59
- Colors: Crimson and white
- Athletics conference: Almont League; CIF Southern Section
- Nickname: Aztecs
- Rival: Alhambra High School
- Newspaper: The Aztec
- Website: mkhs.org

Mark Keppel High School (MKHS) is a four-year California Distinguished School located in the city of Alhambra, California, in the Alhambra Unified School District. The school is in a residential neighborhood, directly south of the abutting Interstate 10, and just across the street of the northern boundary of Monterey Park. Mark Keppel serves students from portions of Alhambra and Monterey Park. Mark Keppel has been accredited by the Western Association of Schools and Colleges—for the first time in 1965 and most recently in 2020, for a fixed term after each evaluation.

== History ==
Mark Keppel High School is named after Mark Keppel, Superintendent of Los Angeles County Schools from 1902 to 1928. Construction began December 19, 1938, three days after the ground-breaking ceremonies. The school was one of the thousands of projects built by the Public Works Administration during the Great Depression.

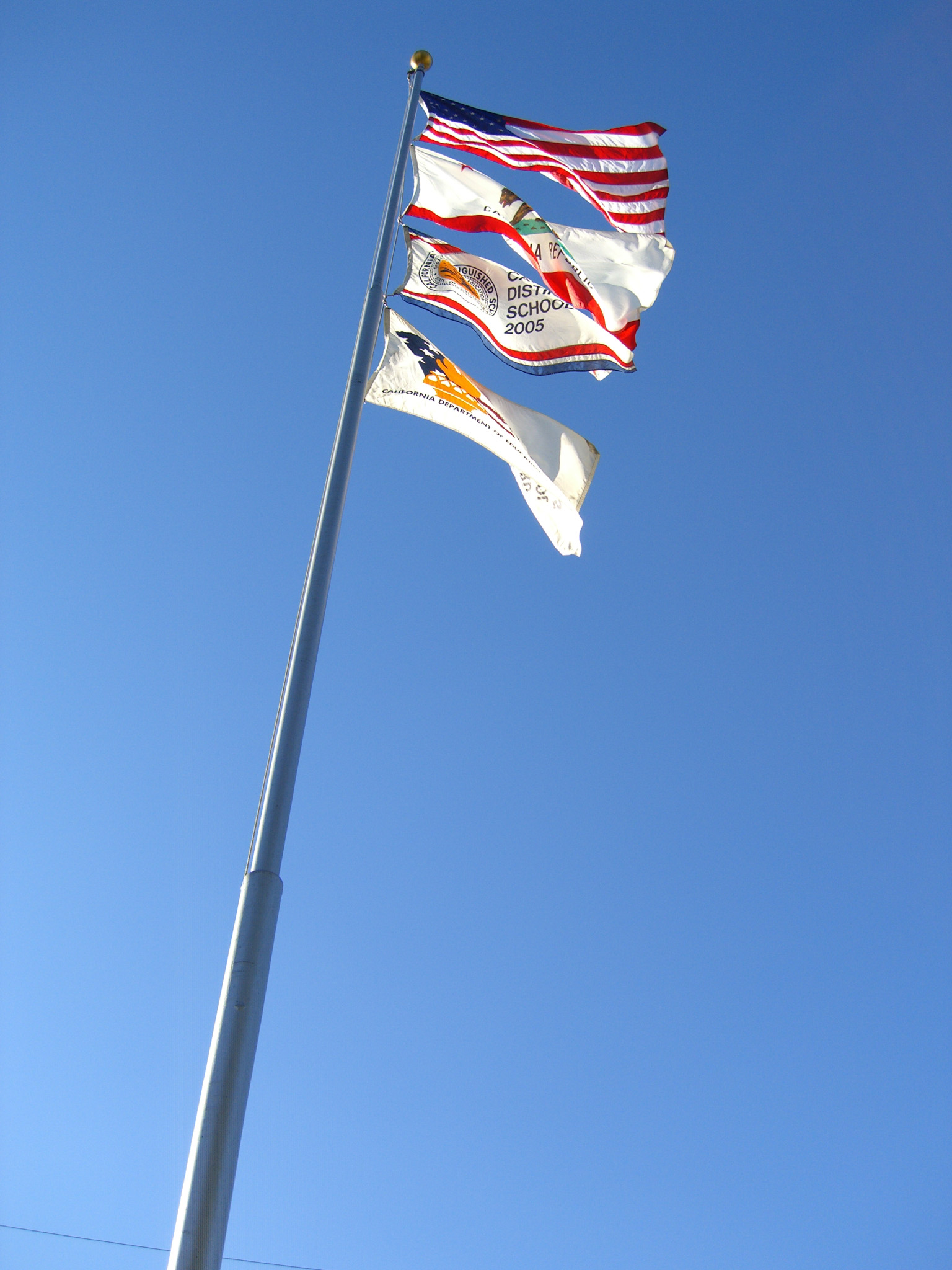
Keppel's Four Flags

== Awards ==
- California Distinguished School Award: 2005
- Exemplary Career Technical Education Award: 2005
- Title I Academic Achievement Award: 2004, 2005, 2006
- Governor's Performance Award: 2001, 2002, 2003
- Ranked 451 on Newsweek's 1,000 "Best High Schools in America": 2004
- First Place in LA County Academic Decathlon: 2008
- Third Place in LA County Science Olympiad: 2012
- First Place in LA County Academic Decathlon: 2014
- Second Place in LA County Academic Decathlon: 2019
- First Place in LA County Academic Decathlon: 2020
- Third Place in California State Academic Decathlon: 2020
- First Place in LA County Academic Decathlon: 2021
- Third Place in California State Academic Decathlon: 2021
- First Place in LA County Academic Decathlon: 2022
- Fifth Place in California State Academic Decathlon: 2022
- Get Lit Poetry Slam Champions: 2022, 2023, 2024
- First Place in LA County Academic Decathlon: 2023
- Fourth Place in California State Academic Decathlon: 2023

== Demographics ==
As of the 2023–2024 school year, the student body was 70.2% Asian American, 24.2% Hispanic or Latino (of any race), and 1.3% non-Hispanic White. The remaining 4.3% consisted of Filipino, African-American, Native American, Pacific Islander, and other students. The predominant languages spoken at students' homes are Cantonese, Mandarin and Spanish. Approximately 50% of the student population participates in a free or reduced lunch program.

== Extracurricular activities ==
=== Visual and performing arts ===
In 2007, band and orchestra teacher Dr. Carla Bartlett won the Performing Arts Center of Los Angeles County's Bravo Award as an in the Arts Specialist division, one of the highlights of her career. Leading the District Band along with rival Alhambra High School's Mark Trulson and San Gabriel High School's Tammy Cognetta, Dr. Bartlett and the marching band qualified to participate in the 2009 Tournament of Roses Parade.

Plays, musicals, and other performances occur throughout the school year, often in conjunction with the school orchestra. In 2015, Mark Keppel High theatre students were invited to the Edinburgh Festival Fringe in Scotland where they performed in a rendition of Peter Pan. Various UC "A-G" certified programs such as AP Art History are offered.

Previously, the school also had their own concert choir and show choir, led by their teacher and director Tony Azeltine. The competitive advanced group, known as "Aztec Singers," competed in various show choir competitions across Los Angeles. About once a year, the students would travel out-of-state to perform or compete with other show choir and concert choir students across the continent.

=== Athletics ===
The Varsity football team, under coach Eddie Wagner, beat Pasadena High School 19-13 for the 1944 CIF-SS Championship at the Los Angeles Coliseum.

Mark Keppel has established itself as one of the premier co-ed Badminton schools in Southern California in the late 1980s and throughout the 1990s. The badminton team has won CIF-SS championships in 1987 (3-A), 1990 (3-A), 1991 (3-A), 1992 (3-A), 1993 (I), 1994 (I), 1996 (I), 1997 (I), 1998 (I), and 2010 (I).

Both the Aztec Boys and Girls Varsity swim teams won back-to-back CIF-SS Division IV championships in the 2007 and 2008 season. The Girls Varsity swim and dive team won the CIF-SS Division III championships in the 2010 season. In addition, the Aztecs have captured the Division 3 CIF-SS championship 2011 in both Boys and Girls.

The boys Varsity soccer team of 1979 won the CIF-SS Division III championship by beating Orange County's University High School by the score of 4-2. This was the first CIF title for the school in any sport during the previous 25 years.

=== Publications ===
Mark Keppel High School's journalism class runs the monthly newspaper, The Aztec. The yearbook is Teocalli, named after the Aztec temple, and comes out once a year several months before summer break begins.

== Architecture ==
Mark Keppel High School is designed in the Streamline Moderne architectural style, a variant of the Art Deco, and a product of the Great Depression. While the Art Deco celebrated the mechanization of the Jazz Age with big, bold, vertical designs, exotic materials, and elaborate decorations, the Streamline Moderne was a more reserved and utilitarian style. The Streamline Moderne mimicked the fast, dynamic look of machines with sleek, aerodynamic and nautical forms, low horizontal designs, rounded corners, and shiny materials.

The architecture of Mark Keppel High School features rounded corners in and outside the auditorium, on the staircase leading up to the front entrance, and in all the interior stairwells. Incised horizontal lines cut through the brick stringcourse which wraps the lower part of the building and the brick pillars between the windows. The stucco texture coat of the facade features designs that emphasize horizontal shapes; blocks between the windows on both floors and along the top of the building contribute to the geometric, yet sleek look of the building. The uppermost block is bounded by a horizontal brick band, and the building is crowned with a small inset ledge. Extra handrails are found in front of the windows in the second floor hallways, in front of the display cases around the administration offices, and on the north wing exterior staircase.

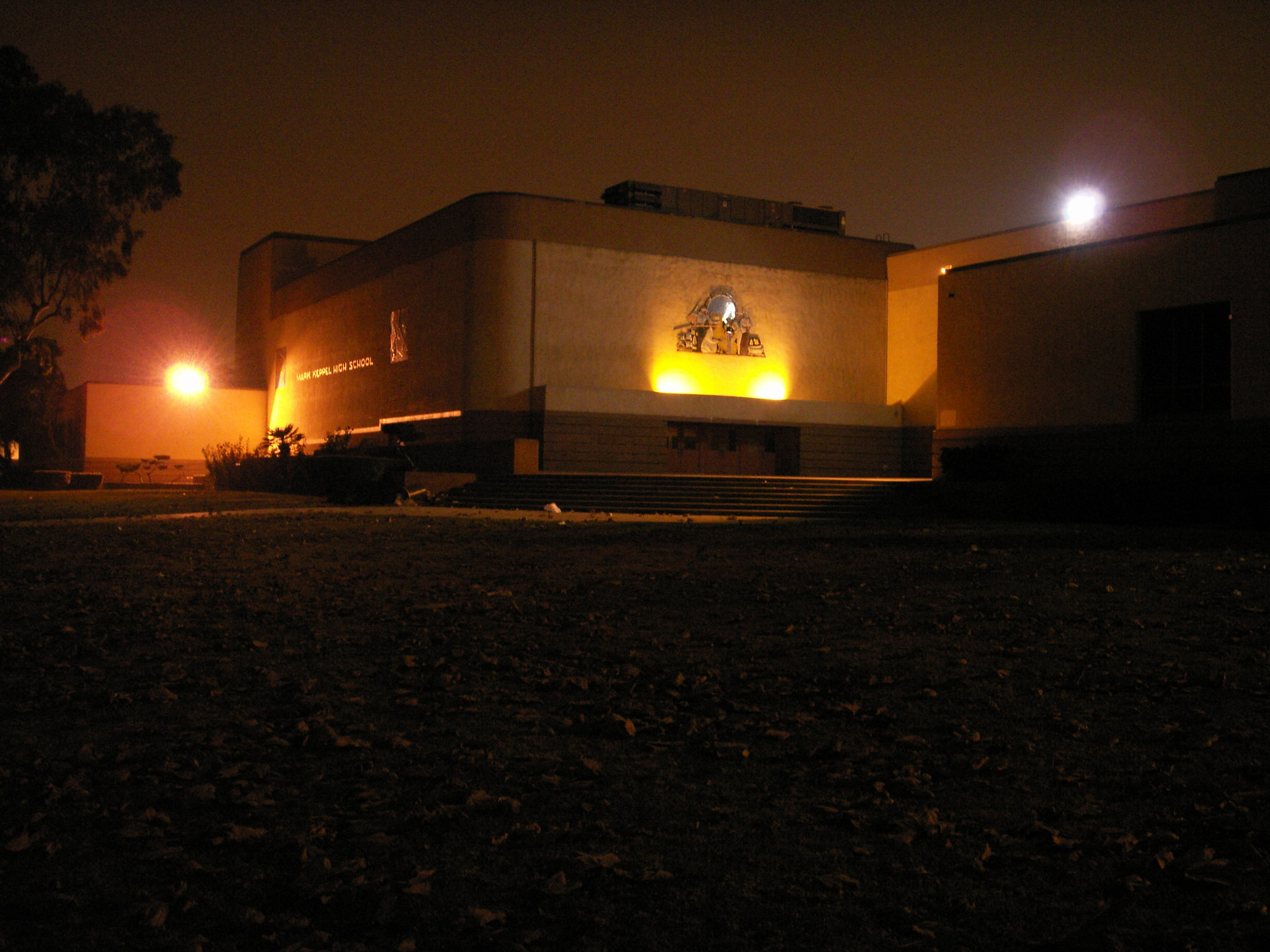
Auditorium & Main Entrance

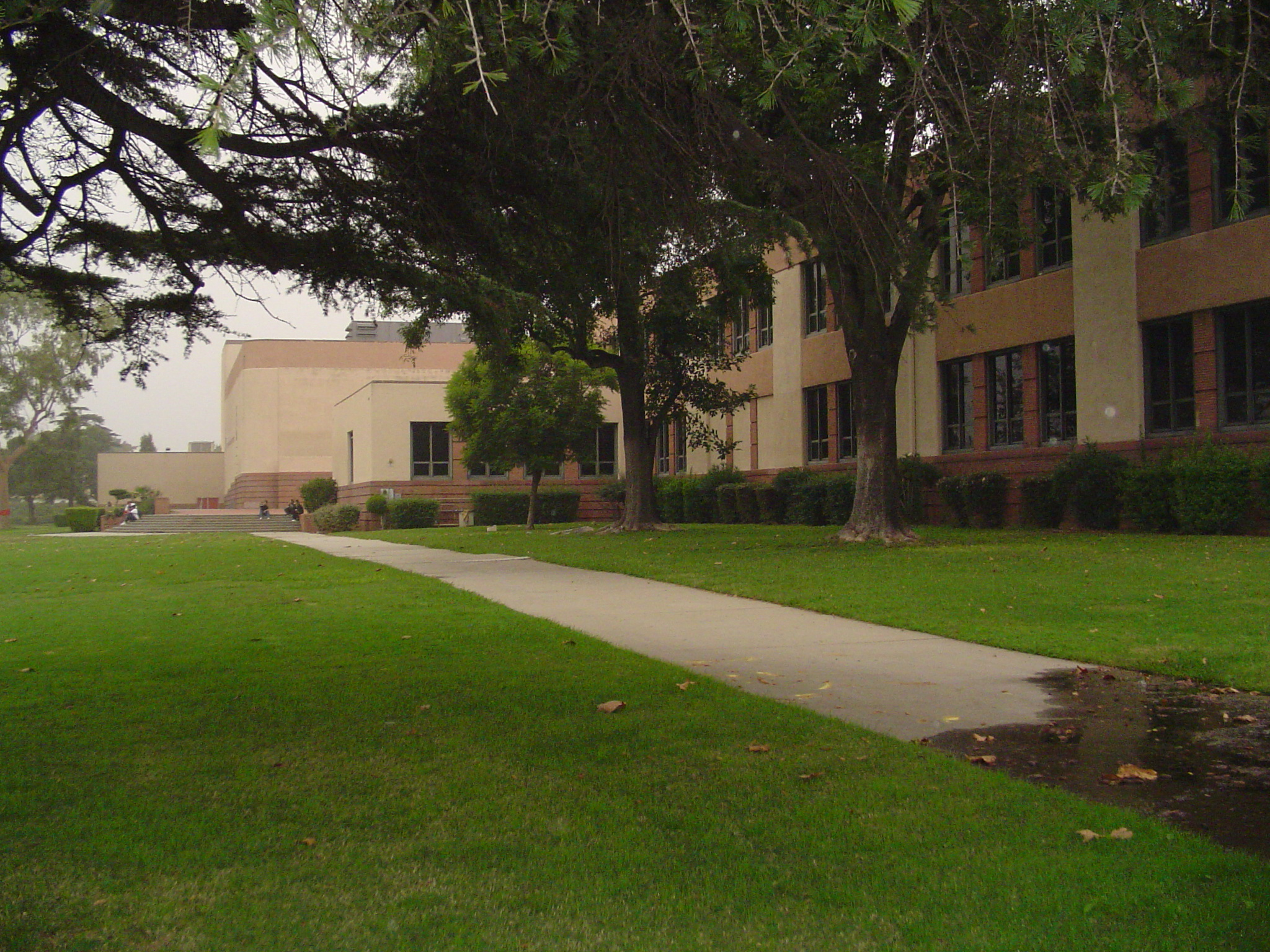
Main Building

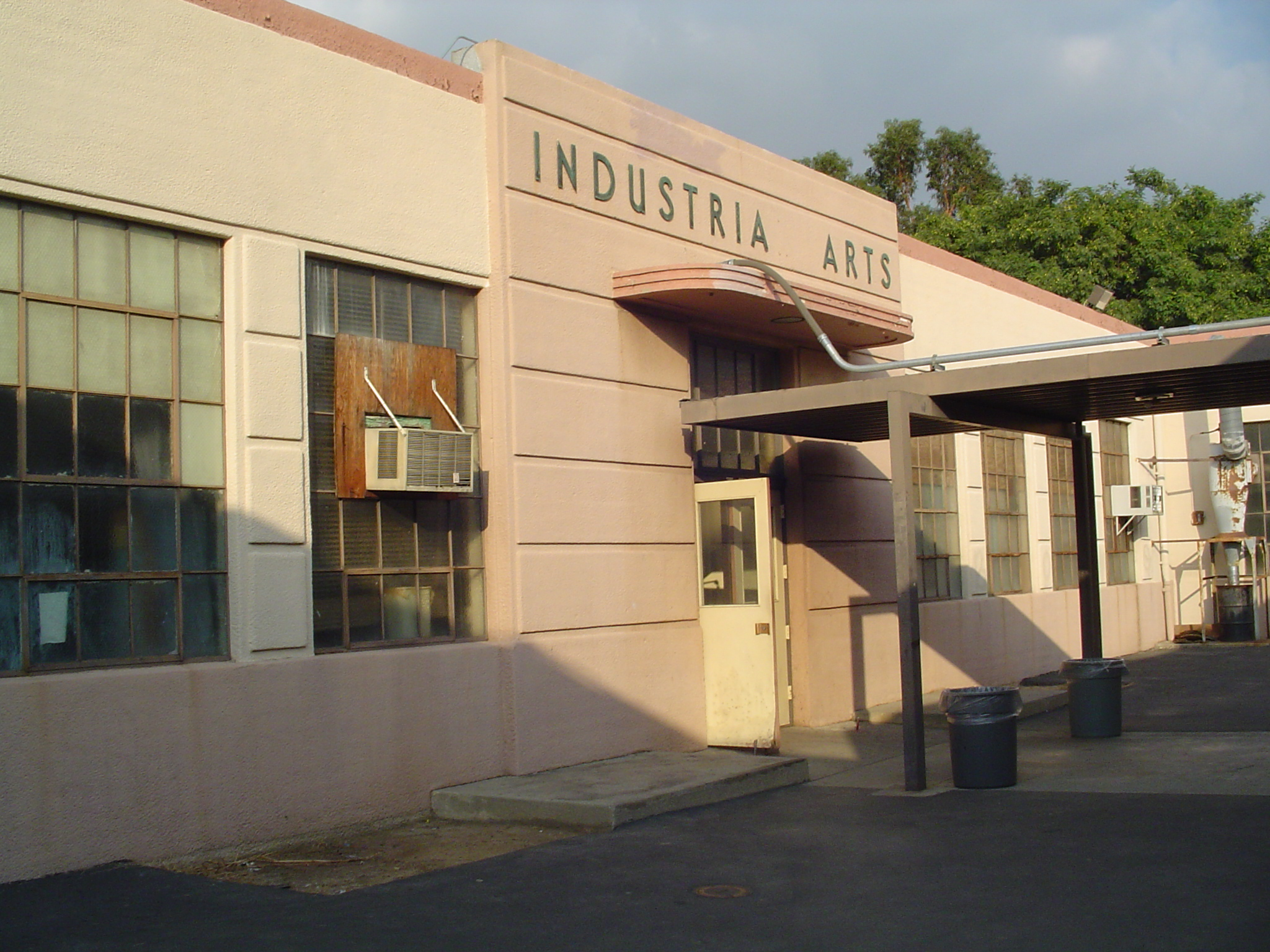
Industrial Arts Building

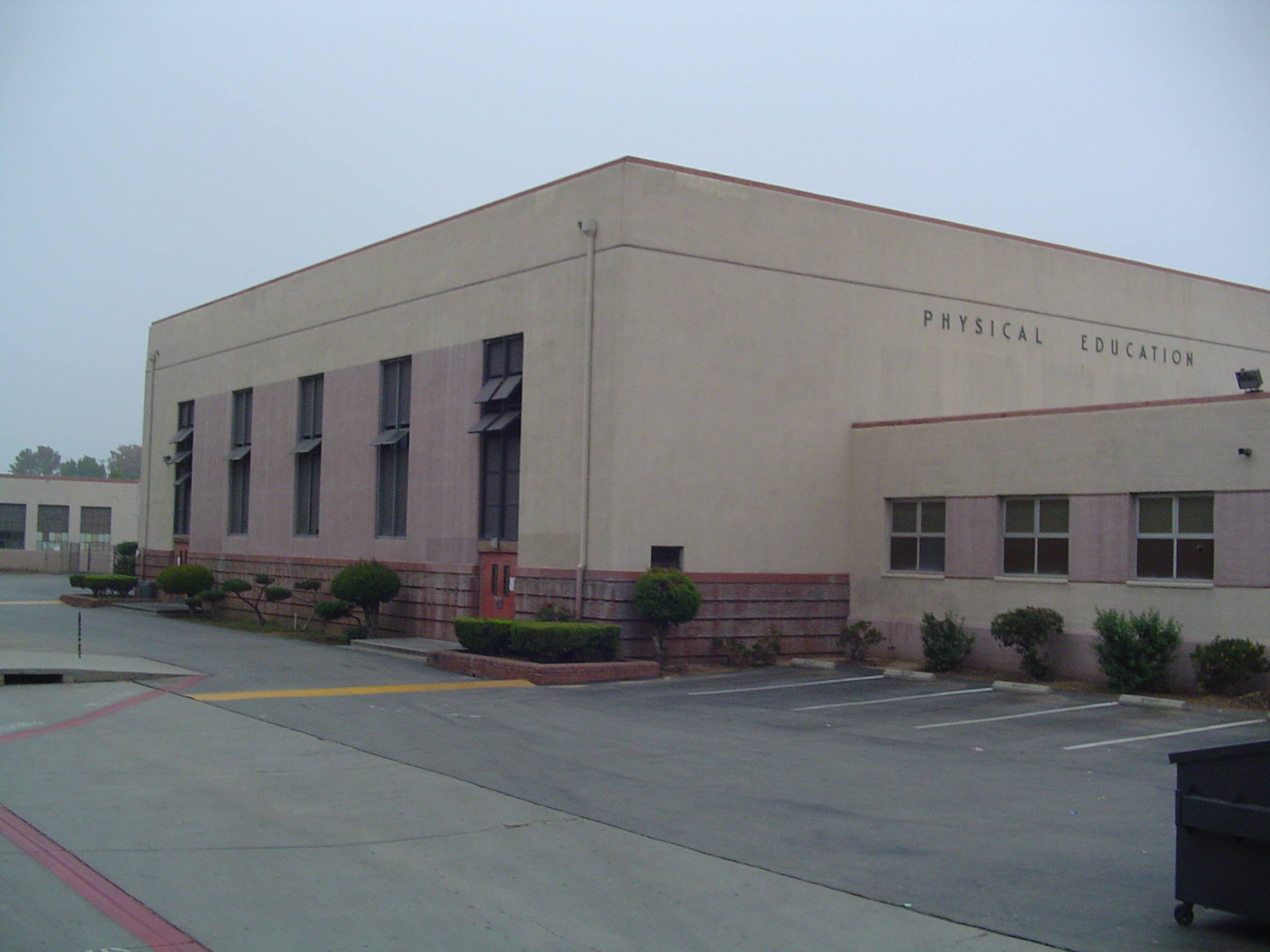
Physical Education Building

=== Murals ===
Mark Keppel High School features three bas relief murals made by native Southern California artist, Millard Sheets.

The three enamel on stainless steel murals entitled "Early California" decorate the exterior of the auditorium, and depict the founding of California as well as the regional features of Los Angeles County. The second image show the placement of the two smaller murals on the auditorium.

The largest mural crowns the entrance to the auditorium and depicts the three main groups that colonized and populated California: the Spanish Conquistadors, the Catholic Missionaries, and American Pioneers. The mural features a golden California on a backdrop of green mountain ranges, dotted with golden Redwood trees, and capped with a large reflective stainless steel sun wrapped with a sunburst decoration. On the left, the Conquistador goes before his ship, claiming the new land in the name of Spain. In the center, a Missionary kneels down, gingerly placing a mission in Southern California. On the right, a Miner 49’er pans for gold while his wife holds their child and rifle, their covered wagons behind them.

The two smaller murals are located on the southern facade of the auditorium, facing toward Hellman Ave. The mural in the center right depicts early Los Angeles County with the San Gabriel Mountains to the north, the San Gabriel Mission surrounded by orange groves in the center, a dairy farm with Cowboy below, and the Long Beach Harbor in the south.

The mural on the right showcases the entire state of California. From north to south: a lumberjack cuts down a Redwood tree, two miners pan for gold, and a farmer harvests oranges from his orange grove. A cowboy gallops in on a white horse from the east, while a large ship sails in majestically from the west.

Mural above Auditorium entrance

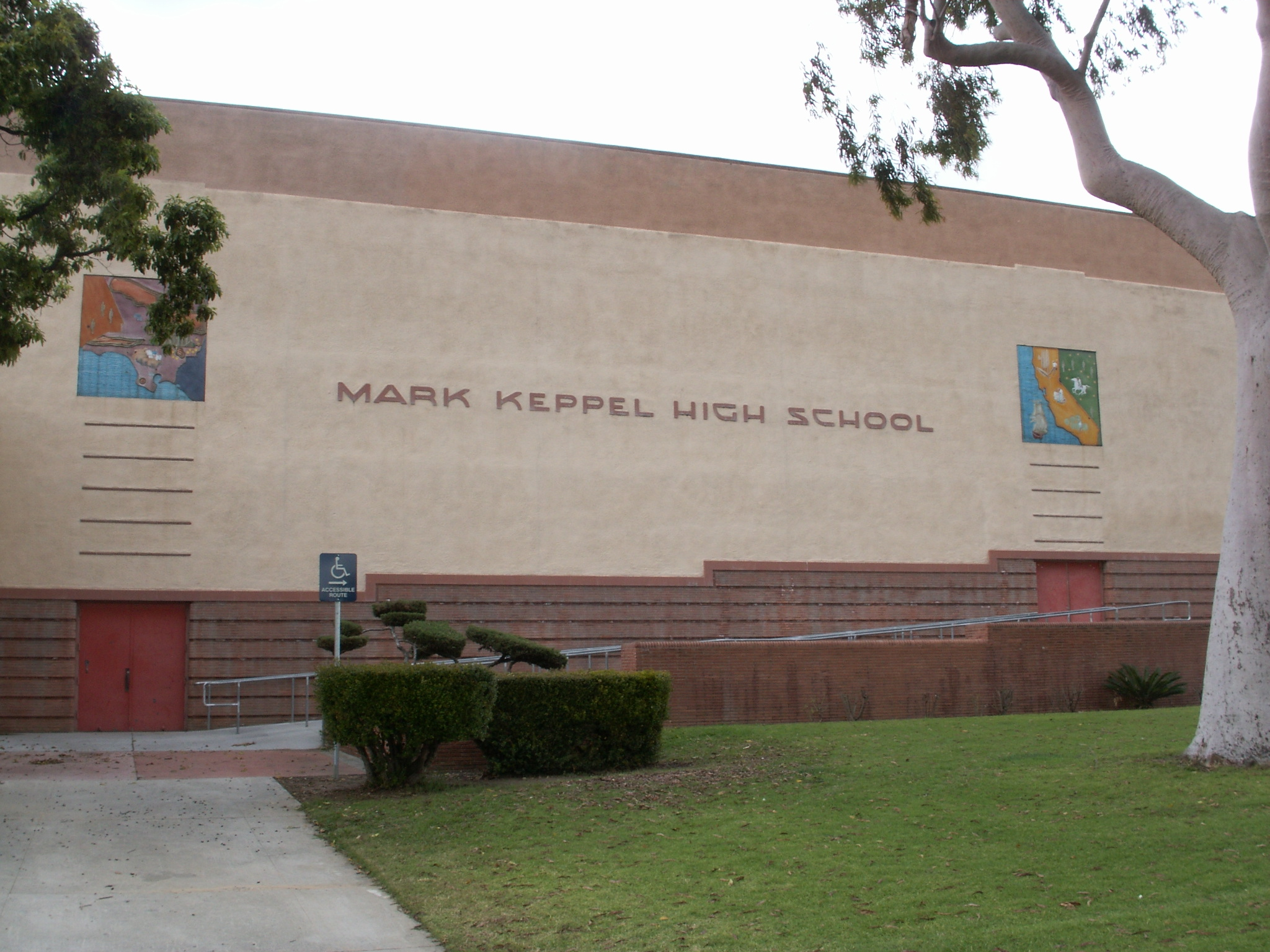
Southern face of Auditorium

California Mural

== Notable alumni ==
- Mike McCormick (pitcher) (b. 1938)— baseball player, CY Young Award Winner
- Hank Aguirre (1949) — baseball player
- Pete Mikkelsen (b. 1939) — baseball player
- Luis J. Rodriguez (b. 1954) — poet, novelist, journalist, critic, and columnist
- Hope Sandoval (b. 1966) — singer
- Dick Frey (b. 1929) — football player
- B. Wayne Hughes (1951) — Founder and director of Public Storage, a self-storage company
- Terence Yin (1993) — actor
- John Tran (1993) — politician, mayor of Rosemead
- Larry Burright — baseball player
- Sasha Renée Pérez (2010) - former Alhambra City Councilmember (2020-2024), California State Senator 25th District (2024–present)
- Justin Young (basketball) (2011) — basketball player
- Tiffany Lau (2015) - Host and actress
