= Alhambra Unified School District =

School district in California, United States

Address
- 1515 West Mission Road Alhambra, California, 91803; United States

District information
- Type: Public
- Grades: K–12
- Superintendent: Denise Jaramillo
- NCES District ID: 0600153

Students and staff
- Students: 15,747
- Teachers: 643.14
- Staff: 887.99
- Student–teacher ratio: 24.48

Other information
- Website: www.ausd.us

The Alhambra Unified School District is a school district based in Alhambra, California.

For grades K-12 AUSD serves the city of Alhambra and most of the city of Monterey Park. For grades 9-12 only it includes additional parts of Monterey Park and parts of the cities of San Gabriel and Rosemead as well as a section of South San Gabriel. District headquarters is located at 1515 W. Mission Road, Alhambra, California 91803.

== History ==
The Alhambra School District, which operated K-8 schools, and Alhambra Union High School District unified in 2004 to create the Alhambra Unified School District.

== Board of education ==
Alhambra Unified School District Board of Education members are represented by a geographical district composed of five members. The elections are held on the first Tuesday after the first Monday in November of even-numbered years at the same time the Alhambra City Council holds its elections. In addition the board of education now has a Student Board Member with a preferential vote, who advocates on behalf of the students and chairs the district Student Advisory Council.

== School uniform ==
Students in grades Kindergarten through 8 are required to wear school uniforms.

The policy, which applied to the Alhambra School District, began in September 1996. The policy remained after the consolidation of ASD and AHSD, with the policy applying to all Kindergarten through 8th-grade students.

== Schools ==
=== Elementary Schools (K through 8) ===
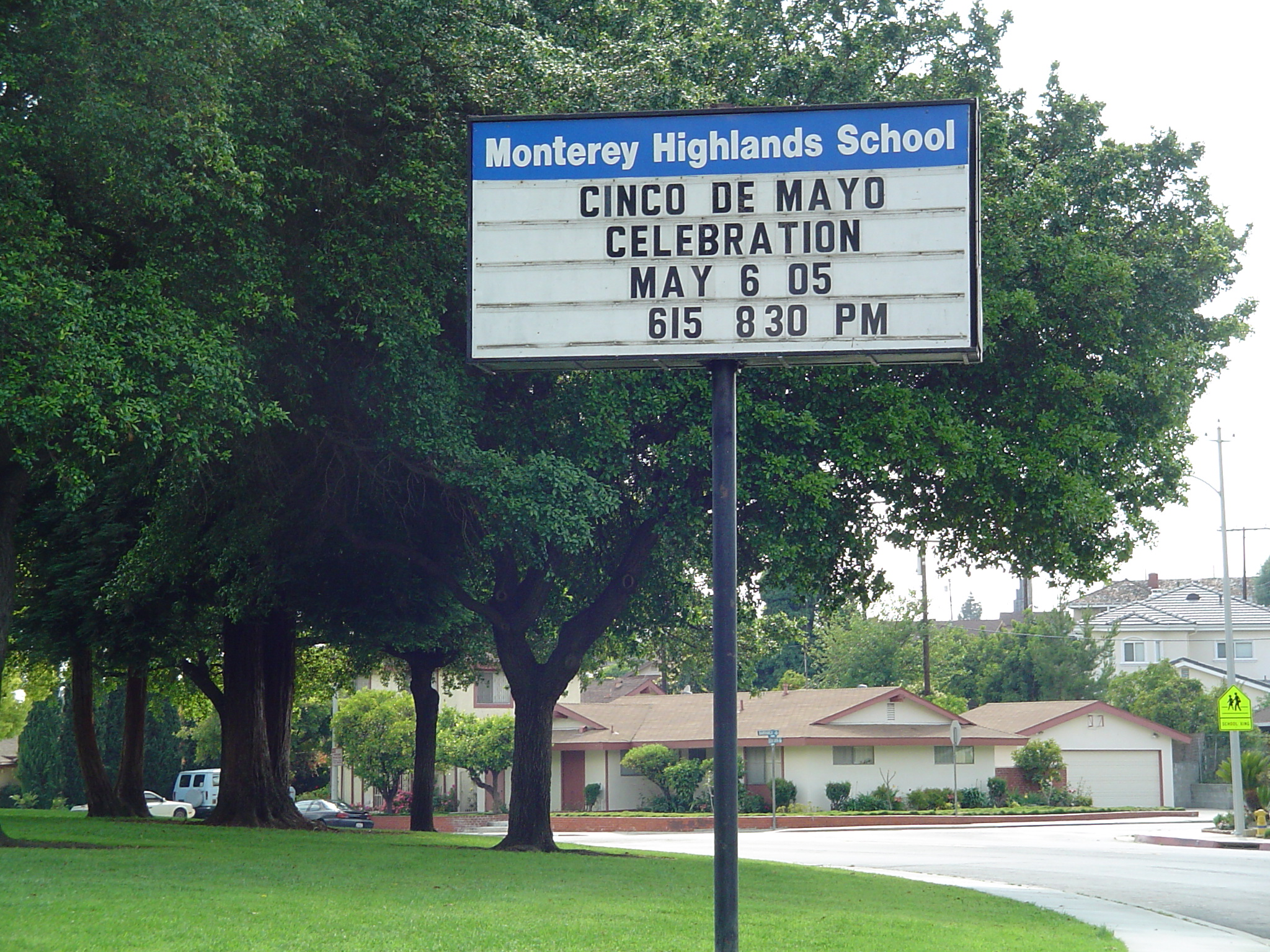
Monterey Highlands School

- Ramona School (Alhambra)
- Martha Baldwin School (Alhambra)
- Brightwood School (Monterey Park)
- Emery Park School (Alhambra)
- Fremont School (Alhambra)
- Garfield School (Alhambra)
- Granada School (Alhambra)
- Marguerita School (Alhambra)
- Monterey Highlands Elementary School (Monterey Park)
- Park School (Alhambra)
- Repetto School (Monterey Park)
- Ynez School (Monterey Park)
- William Northrup School (Alhambra)

=== High schools ===
==== Zoned high schools ====
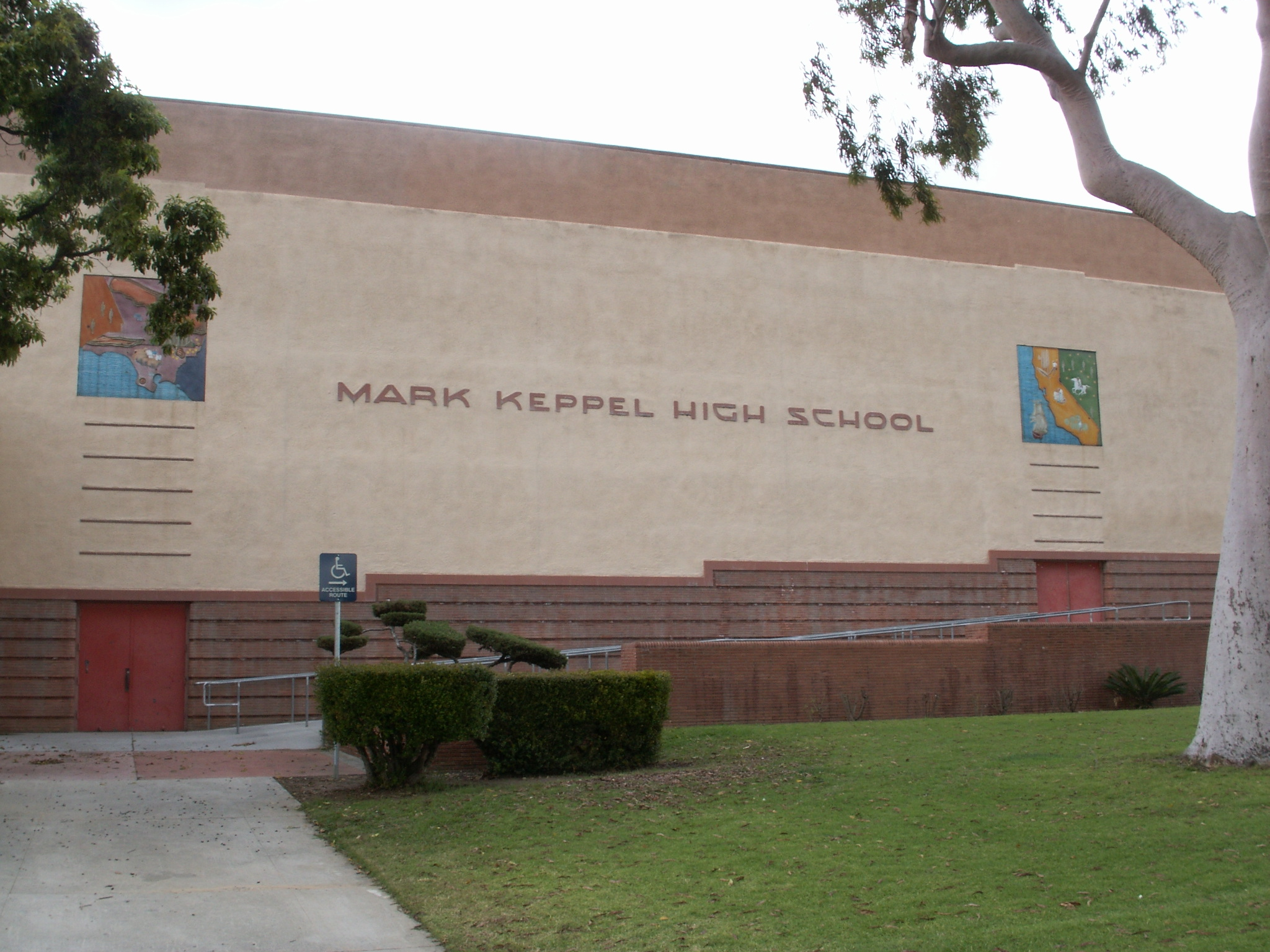
Mark Keppel High School

- Alhambra High School (Alhambra), serving the western portion of Alhambra.
- Mark Keppel High School (Alhambra), serving the southern portion of Alhambra and most of Monterey Park.
- San Gabriel High School (San Gabriel), serving the eastern portion of Alhambra, the southern portion of Rosemead and a small portion of San Gabriel.
- Century High School (Alhambra)
- Independence High School (Alhambra)

== Feeder elementary schools ==
Garvey School District, a K-8 district, "feeds" into AUSD.
