= Vail High School (Montebello, California) =

Location
- 1230 S. Vail Ave. Montebello, California 90640; United States; 33.9932°N 118.1292°W

Information
- Type: Public
- Principal: Horacio Perez
- Grades: 10-12
- Enrollment: 272 (2023–2024)
- Campus: Suburban
- Colors: Red & Yellow
- Team name: Vikings
- Rival: Montebello High School
- Website: vhs.montebello.k12.ca.us

Vail High School is a continuation school located in the city of Montebello, California. It is a small campus whose students are drawn from all the other high schools in the Montebello Unified School District, which include Schurr High School, Montebello High School, Bell Gardens High School and Applied Technology Center. The students are typically sent to Vail by their original high schools once it is determined that they are in danger of not graduating due to lack of eligible credits or poor grades.
