= Cliff Livingston =

American football player (1930–2010)

No. 89, 55
- Positions: Linebacker, defensive end

Personal information
- Born: July 2, 1930; Compton, California, U.S.
- Died: March 13, 2010 (aged 79); Las Vegas, Nevada, U.S.
- Listed height: 6 ft 3 in (1.91 m)
- Listed weight: 218 lb (99 kg)

Career information
- High school: Montebello (Montebello, California)
- College: Orange Coast College (1948–1949); UCLA (1950–1951)
- NFL draft: 1954: undrafted

Career history
- New York Giants (1954–1961); Minnesota Vikings (1962); Los Angeles Rams (1963–1965)

Awards and highlights
- NFL champion (1956)

Career NFL statistics
- Fumble recoveries: 19
- Interceptions: 8
- Sacks: 8.5
- Stats at Pro Football Reference

Clifford Lyman Livingston (July 2, 1930 – March 13, 2010) was an American professional football player who was a linebacker in the National Football League (NFL) for the New York Giants, the Minnesota Vikings and the Los Angeles Rams. He was born in Compton, California and played college football at UCLA.

In 1965 while with the Rams, he and several of his teammates appeared in cameo roles in the Perry Mason episode, "The Case of the 12th Wildcat."

He died at his home in the affluent neighborhood of Southern Highlands in Las Vegas, Nevada on March 13, 2010.

His brother Howie Livingston (1922–1994) also played in the NFL.
