= Howie Livingston =

American football player (1922–1994)

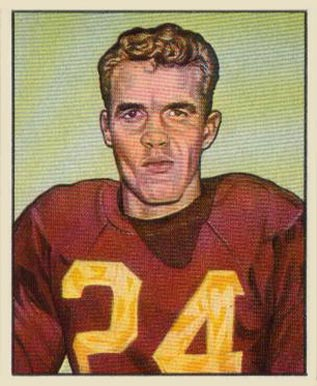

No. 24, 48
- Positions: Running back, defensive back

Personal information
- Born: May 15, 1922; Los Angeles, California, U.S.
- Died: July 27, 1994 (aged 72); Yorba Linda, California, U.S.
- Listed height: 6 ft 1 in (1.85 m)
- Listed weight: 183 lb (83 kg)

Career information
- High school: Montebello (California)
- College: Fullerton

Career history
- New York Giants (1944–1947); Washington Redskins (1948–1950); San Francisco 49ers (1950); Chicago Bears (1953)
- Stats at Pro Football Reference

Howard Livingston (May 15, 1922 – July 27, 1994) was an American professional football player who was a running back and defensive back in the National Football League (NFL).

Livingston was born in Los Angeles, California and played scholastically at Montebello High School. He played collegiately at Fullerton Junior College.

He spent his eight year NFL career with the New York Giants (1944–1947), Washington Redskins (1948–1950), San Francisco 49ers (1950), and the Chicago Bears (1953). His rookie year, he led the NFL in interceptions, with nine. He finished his career with 29 interceptions, and also scored 20 touchdowns, 16 of those on offense.

His brother Cliff Livingston (1930–2010) also played in the NFL.
