= Almont League =

High-school athletic conference in Southern California

The Almont League was a high school athletic conference in Los Angeles County, California, USA, which included six high schools, three from the Alhambra Unified School District and three from the Montebello Unified School District affiliated with the CIF Southern Section. Its name is a portmanteau of the words "Alhambra" and "Montebello". The league was created at the start of the 1992–93 school year and it is affiliated with the Foothill Area.

As of 05/01/2026, the Almont League has been disbanded and will be restructured into the MAC (Metro Association Conference).

== Schools ==
The schools formerly in the league were:

- Alhambra High School
- Bell Gardens High School
- Mark Keppel High School (Alhambra, California)
- Montebello High School
- San Gabriel High School
- Schurr High School (Montebello, California)
