= Commerce, California =

City in California, United States

- City
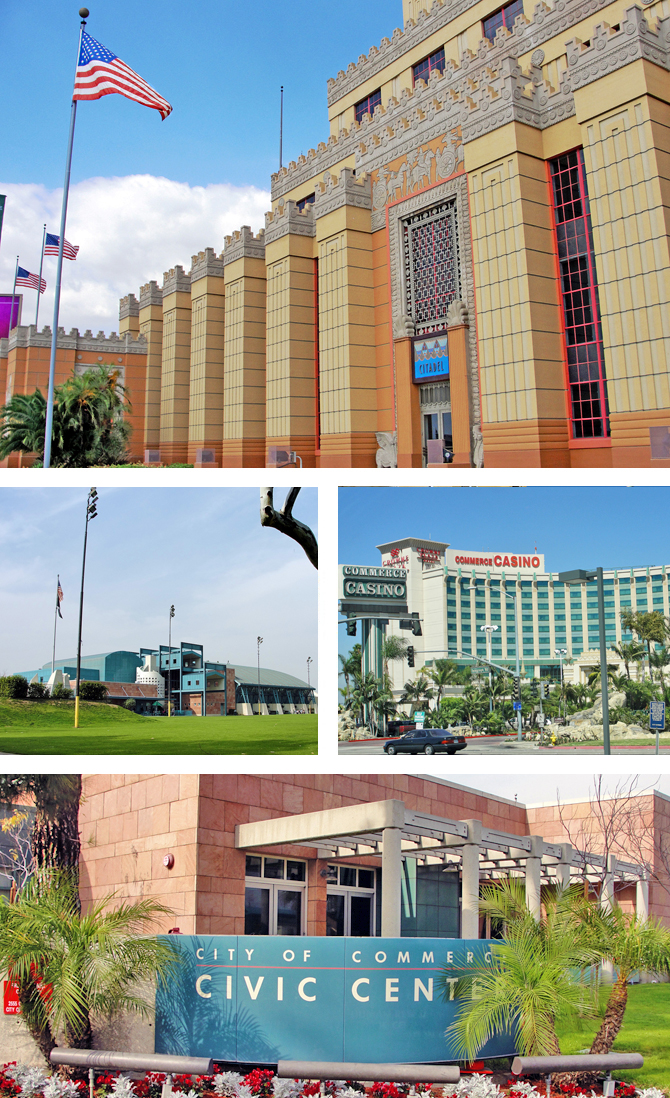
- Images, from top, left to right: Citadel Outlets, Rosewood Park and Aquatorium, Commerce Casino, Civic Center

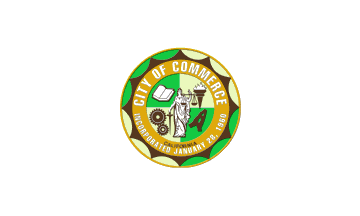
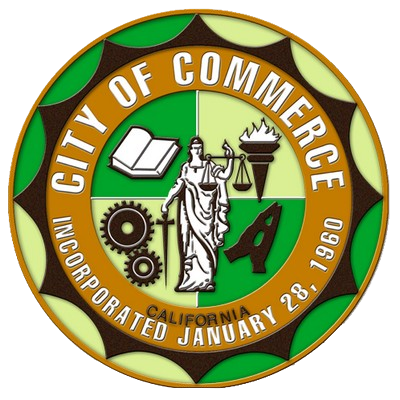
- Flag Seal
- Motto: "The Model City"
- Interactive map of Commerce, California
- Location of Commerce in Los Angeles County, California Location of Commerce in California Location of Commerce in the USA
- Coordinates: 34°0′2″N 118°9′17″W
- Country: United States
- State: California
- County: Los Angeles
- Incorporated: January 28, 1960

Government
  - Mayor: Kevin Lainez
  - Vice Mayor: Mireya Garcia
  - City council: Hugo A. Argumedo; Ivan Altamirano; Oralia Rebollo
  - City Manager: Ernie Hernandez

Area
  - Total: 6.53 sq mi (16.92 km^{2})
  - Land: 6.53 sq mi (16.92 km^{2})
  - Water: 0 sq mi (0.00 km^{2}) 0.02%
- Elevation: 141 ft (43 m)

Population (2020)
  - Total: 12,378
  - Density: 1,894.6/sq mi (731.49/km^{2})
- Time zone: UTC−8 (PST)
  - Summer (DST): UTC−7 (PDT)
- ZIP Codes: 90022–90023, 90040, 90091
- Area code: 213/323/562
- FIPS code: 06-14974
- GNIS feature IDs: 1660503, 2410209
- Website: www.commerceca.gov

Commerce is a city located in southeast Los Angeles County, California, United States. The population was 12,378 at the 2020 census, down from 12,823 at the 2010 census. It is usually referred to as the City of Commerce to distinguish it from the common noun. It is bordered by Vernon on the west, Los Angeles on the northwest, East Los Angeles on the north, Montebello on the east, Downey and Bell Gardens on the south, and Maywood on the southwest. The Los Angeles River forms part of its southwestern boundary, and the Rio Hondo separates it from Downey. Commerce is served by the Long Beach and Santa Ana freeways, as well as the Metrolink commuter rail service at the Commerce station.

== History ==
In the 19th century, the area was part of Antonio Maria Lugo's Rancho San Antonio. Its conversion to an industrial area began in 1887, when the Atchison, Topeka and Santa Fe Railway built its main line through the area. The ranch remained intact until Arcadia Bandini de Stearns Baker, reputedly once the wealthiest woman in Los Angeles, sold some of it around the turn of the 20th century. The Atchison, Topeka and Santa Fe Railway and Los Angeles and Salt Lake Railroad (later the Union Pacific) both were built through what would become the community, as was the Pacific Electric Railway's Whittier Line. By the 1920s, factories had arrived. In the late 1940s, industrial leaders banded together with residents in the communities of Bandini, Rosewood, and Laguna to encourage commerce. They changed the name to match that goal.

The city was incorporated in 1960 to prevent neighboring cities such as Vernon and Los Angeles from annexing industrial land for tax revenue and elected its first city mayor, Maurice Quigley. In the 1970s and 1980s, Commerce successfully negotiated the turbulent period of deindustrialization that hammered nearby cities such as South Gate and Norwalk, maintaining much of its manufacturing and goods-distribution base and successfully converting former industrial land to lucrative commercial uses. The most notable example of this phenomenon is the Citadel Outlets mall, which occupies the site of a former tire factory. The owner of the Citadel, Steve Craig, hosts an annual Clean Up Commerce Day and enlists other businesses to work with the city and volunteers in beautifying a specific area of the city. With a major rail yard within its borders, Commerce has also benefited greatly from the huge expansion in international trade traffic through the ports of Los Angeles and Long Beach, albeit at the expense of severe air pollution caused by truck congestion on the Long Beach Freeway.

Chrysler had an assembly plant in Commerce from 1930 through July 1971 located at 5800 S. Eastern Avenue and Slauson Avenue, called Los Angeles (Maywood) Assembly. It was closed at the end of the 1971 model year, as Chrysler decided to triple-stack its transport trains for the 1972 model year; its Los Angeles facility couldn't accommodate this change.

Commerce is also the site of Williams Ranch, on which is the swimming hole that the Sleepy Lagoon Murder of José Díaz took place in 1942. The Sleepy Lagoon swimming hole was located near Slauson and Eastern Ave.

== Geography ==
According to the United States Census Bureau, the city has a total area of 6.5 square miles (17 km^{2}), over 99% of which is land.

== Demographics ==
Historical population
Census	Pop.	Note	%±
1960	9,555		—
1970	10,635		11.3%
1980	10,509		−1.2%
1990	12,135		15.5%
2000	12,568		3.6%
2010	12,823		2.0%
2020	12,378		−3.5%
U.S. Decennial Census; 1860–1870 1880-1890; 1900 1910 1920; 1930 1940 1950; 1960 1970 1980; 1990 2000 2010; 2020

Commerce first appeared as a city in the 1960 U.S. census as part of the Southeast census county division.

=== Racial and ethnic composition ===
Commerce city, California – Racial and ethnic composition Note: the US Census treats Hispanic/Latino as an ethnic category. This table excludes Latinos from the racial categories and assigns them to a separate category. Hispanics/Latinos may be of any race.
Race / Ethnicity (NH = Non-Hispanic)	Pop 1980	Pop 1990	Pop 2000	Pop 2010	Pop 2020	% 1980	% 1990	% 2000	% 2010	% 2020
White alone (NH)	1,357	823	519	402	293	12.91%	6.78%	4.13%	3.13%	2.37%
Black or African American alone (NH)	31	79	63	66	88	0.29%	0.65%	0.50%	0.51%	0.71%
Native American or Alaska Native alone (NH)	95	56	52	48	38	0.90%	0.46%	0.41%	0.37%	0.31%
Asian alone (NH)	69	127	122	134	163	0.66%	1.055	0.97%	1.04%	1.32%
Native Hawaiian or Pacific Islander alone (NH)	69	127	1	7	3	0.66%	1.055	0.01%	0.05%	0.02%
Other race alone (NH)	21	44	7	24	44	0.20%	0.36%	0.06%	0.19%	0.36%
Mixed race or Multiracial (NH)	x	x	39	28	59	x	x	0.31%	0.22%	0.48%
Hispanic or Latino (any race)	8,937	11,006	11,765	12,114	11,690	85.03%	90.70%	93.61%	94.47%	94.44%
Total	10,510	12,135	12,568	12,823	12,378	100.00%	100.00%	100.00%	100.00%	100.00%

=== 2020 census ===
As of the 2020 census, Commerce had a population of 12,378 and a population density of 1,894.7 inhabitants per square mile (731.5/km^{2}). The median age was 36.5 years. 23.3% of residents were under the age of 18 and 14.5% were 65 years of age or older. For every 100 females, there were 95.9 males, and for every 100 females age 18 and over there were 94.2 males.

The census reported that 99.4% of the population lived in households, 0.1% lived in non-institutionalized group quarters, and 0.4% were institutionalized. 100.0% of residents lived in urban areas, while 0.0% lived in rural areas.

There were 3,449 households, of which 45.2% had children under the age of 18 living in them. Of all households, 46.9% were married-couple households, 7.6% were cohabiting couple households, 16.4% had a male householder with no spouse or partner present, and 29.1% had a female householder with no spouse or partner present. About 16.6% of all households were made up of individuals and 8.9% had someone living alone who was 65 years of age or older. The average household size was 3.57. There were 2,706 families (78.5% of all households).

There were 3,524 housing units at an average density of 539.4 units per square mile (208.3 units/km^{2}), of which 3,449 (97.9%) were occupied. Of these, 47.3% were owner-occupied and 52.7% were occupied by renters. The vacancy rate was 2.1%; the homeowner vacancy rate was 0.5% and the rental vacancy rate was 1.5%.

=== 2023 ACS estimates ===
In 2023, the US Census Bureau estimated that the median household income was $71,768, and the per capita income was $26,570. About 11.3% of families and 13.6% of the population were below the poverty line.

=== 2010 census ===
At the 2010 census Commerce had a population of 12,823. The population density was 1,961.4 inhabitants per square mile (757.3/km^{2}). The racial makeup of Commerce was 6,930 (54.0%) White (3.1% Non-Hispanic White), 96 (0.7%) African American, 161 (1.3%) Native American, 140 (1.1%) Asian, 9 (0.1%) Pacific Islander, 4,886 (38.1%) from other races, and 601 (4.7%) from two or more races. Hispanic or Latino of any race were 12,114 persons (94.5%).

The census reported that 12,753 people (99.5% of the population) lived in households, 2 (0%) lived in non-institutionalized group quarters, and 68 (0.5%) were institutionalized.

There were 3,382 households, 1,751 (51.8%) had children under the age of 18 living in them, 1,693 (50.1%) were opposite-sex married couples living together, 708 (20.9%) had a female householder with no husband present, 308 (9.1%) had a male householder with no wife present. There were 248 (7.3%) unmarried opposite-sex partnerships, and 23 (0.7%) same-sex married couples or partnerships; 559 households (16.5%) were one person and 326 (9.6%) had someone living alone who was 65 or older. The average household size was 3.77. There were 2,709 families (80.1% of households); the average family size was 4.17.

The age distribution was 3,824 people (29.8%) under the age of 18, 1,458 people (11.4%) aged 18 to 24, 3,581 people (27.9%) aged 25 to 44, 2,590 people (20.2%) aged 45 to 64, and 1,370 people (10.7%) who were 65 or older. The median age was 31.2 years. For every 100 females, there were 96.4 males. For every 100 females age 18 and over, there were 92.7 males.

There were 3,470 housing units at an average density of 530.8 per square mile, of the occupied units 1,619 (47.9%) were owner-occupied and 1,763 (52.1%) were rented. The homeowner vacancy rate was 1.0%; the rental vacancy rate was 1.8%. 6,631 people (51.7% of the population) lived in owner-occupied housing units and 6,122 people (47.7%) lived in rental housing units.

According to the 2010 United States Census, Commerce had a median household income of $48,729, with 16.5% of the population living below the federal poverty line.

=== 2000 census ===
These were the ten cities or neighborhoods in Los Angeles County with the largest percentage of Latino residents, according to the 2000 census:

1. East Los Angeles, 96.7%
2. Maywood, 96.4%
3. City Terrace, 94.4%
4. Huntington Park, 95.1%
5. Boyle Heights, 94.0%
6. Cudahy, 93.8%
7. Bell Gardens, 93.7%
8. Commerce 93.4%
9. Vernon, 92.6%
10. South Gate, 92.1%

As of 2000, Mexican (78.4%) and Irish (0.9%) were the most common ancestries. Mexico (83.4%) and El Salvador (4.7%) were the most common foreign places of birth.

== Economy ==
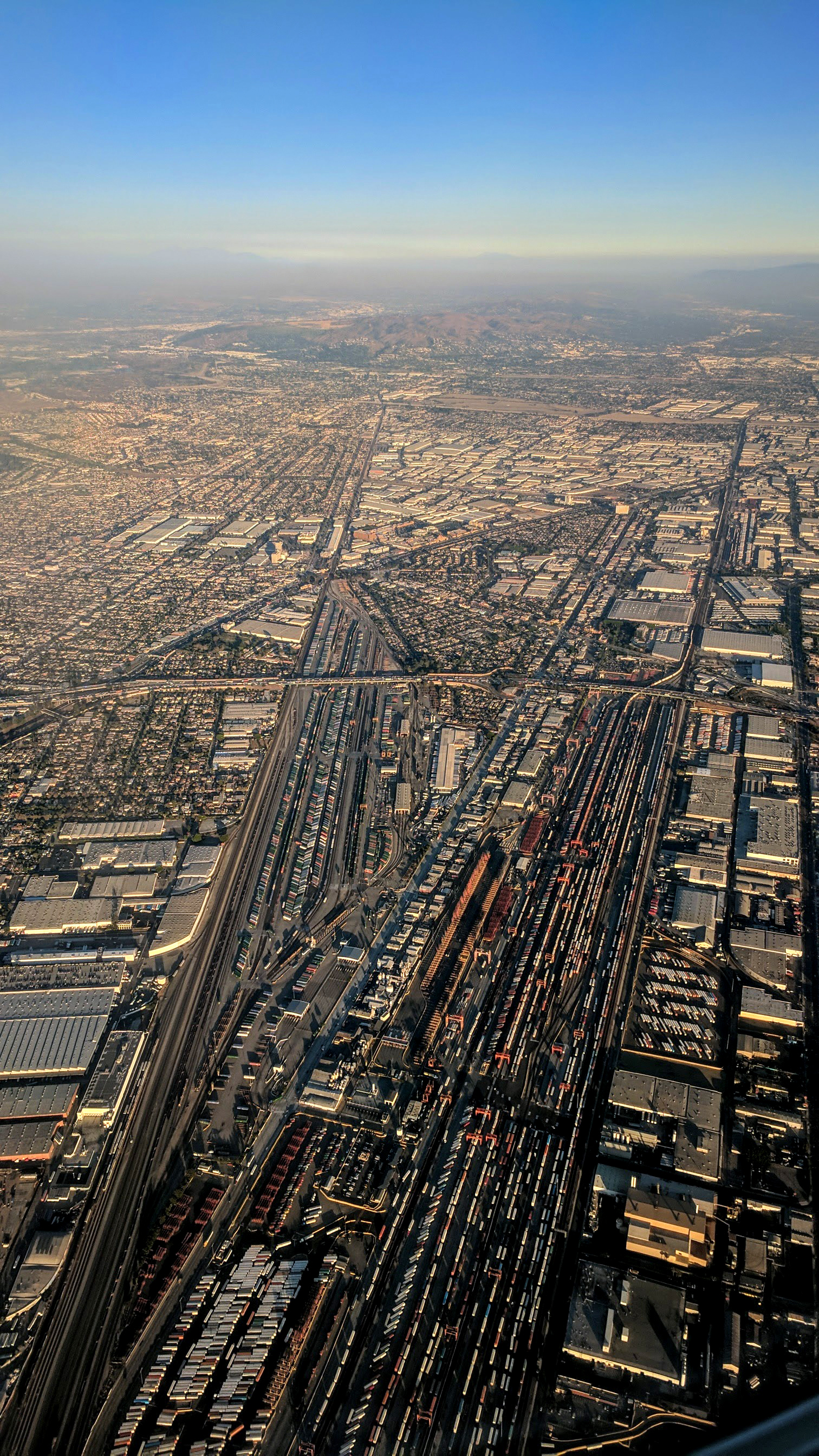
Rail yards in Commerce, left, and Vernon, right. The upper center industrial/commercial area is mostly Commerce.

=== Principal employers ===
According to the city's 2010 Comprehensive Annual Financial Report, the top employers in the city are:

#	Employer	# of Employees
1	Commerce Casino	2,191
2	County of Los Angeles	910
3	Parsec	890
4	Smart & Final	769
5	Unified Grocers	748
6	American International Industries	592
7	Mission Foods	590
7	99 Cents Only Stores	549
9	Megatoys	480
10	Wine Warehouse	376
11	Valassis Direct Mail	350
12	Gibson Overseas	346
13	City of Commerce	315
14	AT&T California	302

Kimlan Foods USA has its headquarters in Commerce.

== Government ==
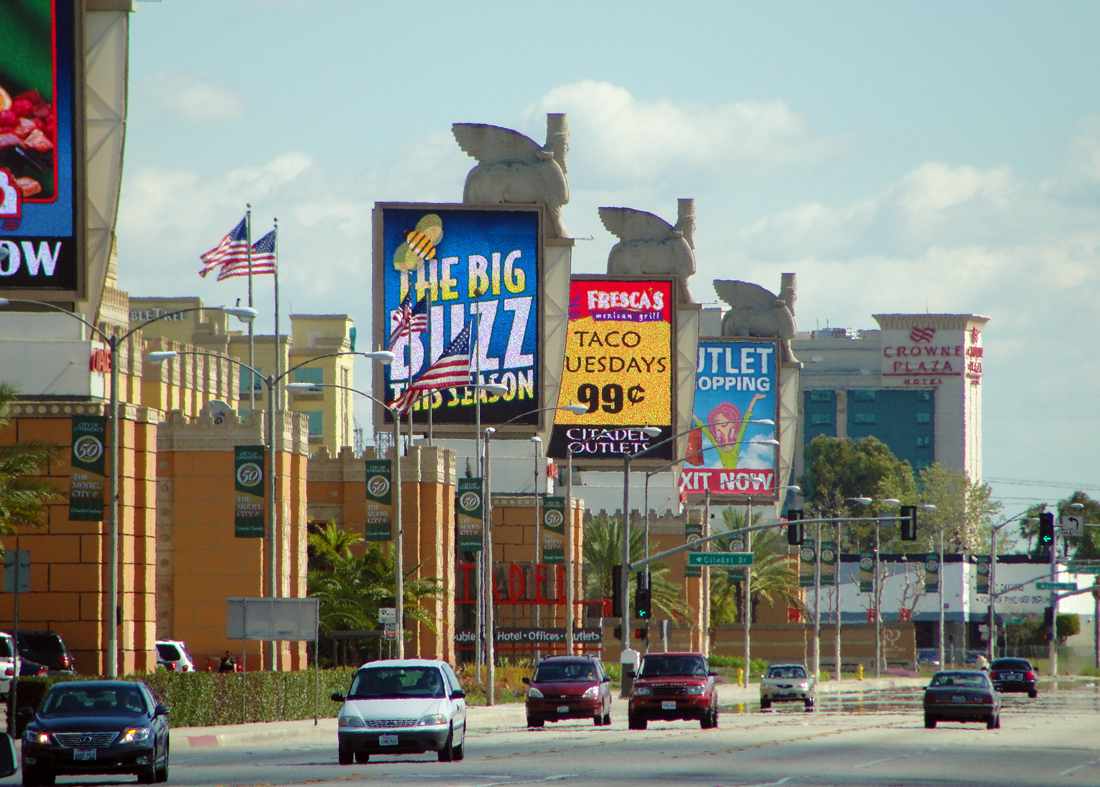
Citadel Outlets and Commerce Casino

In the California State Legislature, Commerce is in the 33rd senatorial district, represented by Democrat Lena Gonzalez, and in the 54th Assembly district, represented by Democrat Mark Gonzalez.

In the United States House of Representatives, Commerce is in California's 42nd Congressional District, Represented by Democrat Robert Garcia.

Commerce residents have many civic services funded from taxes on the local card club, the Commerce Casino, which accounts for 46% ($19.5 Million for budget year 2005/06) of Commerce's tax revenues, and the Citadel. This includes four libraries, a senior center, a teen center, an aquatics center, and a city-owned camp in the San Bernardino National Forest. Commerce is also one of the few cities in California that provides its residents with free bus service. Commerce operates five bus lines within the city, two routes running Sundays only, and one express bus between The Citadel shopping center and Downtown Los Angeles.

== Education ==
Most of Commerce is served by Montebello Unified School District, while small portions are served by the Los Angeles Unified School District.

=== Montebello Unified School District ===
Elementary schools that serve Commerce include:

- Bandini Elementary School (Commerce)
- Suva Elementary School (Bell Gardens)

Intermediate schools that serve Commerce include:

- Bell Gardens Intermediate School (Bell Gardens)
- Suva Intermediate School (Bell Gardens)
- La Merced Intermediate School (Montebello)

K–8 schools:

- Rosewood Park School (Commerce)

High schools that serve Commerce include:

- Bell Gardens High School (Bell Gardens)
- Montebello High School (Montebello)
- Schurr High School (Montebello)

=== Los Angeles Unified School District ===
- Ford Boulevard Elementary School (Unincorporated Los Angeles County)
- Griffith Middle School (Unincorporated Los Angeles County)
- Garfield High School (Unincorporated Los Angeles County)

== Infrastructure ==
Los Cerritos Community News serves the city.

=== Health care ===
The Los Angeles County Department of Health Services operates the Whittier Health Center in Whittier, serving Commerce.

=== Emergency services ===
==== Fire services ====
Fire protection in Commerce is provided by the Los Angeles County Fire Department, which has its headquarters in Commerce. The LACFD operates Station #22 at 928 South Gerhart Avenue, Station #27, the battalion headquarters, at 6031 Rickenbacker Road, and Station #50 at 2327 South Saybrook Avenue, all in Commerce, as a part of Battalion 3. Ambulance transport is provided by Care Ambulance Service.

==== Police services ====
The Los Angeles County Sheriff's Department (LASD) operates the East Los Angeles Station in East Los Angeles, serving Commerce.

== Sister cities ==
Commerce is a sister city of Nanning, Guangxi, China.
