= Ivan Guevara =

Ecuadorian-American men's basketball coach

Biographical details
- Born: October 15, 1936 (age 90); Guayaquil, Ecuador
- Education: Whittier College (BA, MEd)

Playing career
- 1955–1959: Whittier
- Position: Guard

Coaching career (HC unless noted)
- 1959–1968: Whittier (freshman)
- 1968–1971: Whittier
- 1972–1979: San Jose State

Head coaching record
- Overall: 168–138
- Tournaments: 2–3 (NAIA)

Accomplishments and honors

Championships
- 3 SCIAC (1968–69, 1969–70, 1970–71)

Awards
- NAIA District 3 Coach of the Year (1970-71)

Ivan F. Guevara (born October 15, 1936) is an Ecuadorian-American college basketball head coach. Guevara was the head men's basketball coach at Whittier College from 1968 to 1971 and San Jose State University from 1972 to 1979. He is the very first coach of Ecuadorian descent to be a head coach at an NCAA Division I men's basketball program.

== Early life ==
Guevara was born and raised in Guayaquil, Ecuador to Superintendent and Spanish language teacher Ernesto Guevara and Violeta Carrasco. His family then moved to Montebello, California circa 1949 or 1950. Guevara learned how to speak English by "playing [basketball] with his Montebello neighbors". Guevara attended Montebello High School and played on its basketball as a Forward and track and field teams. Guevara earned second-team all-conference honors during his senior year. Guevara graduated from Montebello High School in 1955.

== Playing career ==
Guevara committed to play at Whittier College for longtime head coach Aubrey Bonham. Guevara played on the college's freshman team as a Guard during the 1955–56 season. Guevara eventually played on the varsity team by his sophomore season. During the 1957–58 season, Guevara was a bench player that was part of the team that upset a previously Division II Sacramento State team and won a share of the Southern California Intercollegiate Athletic Conference (SCIAC) men's basketball regular season championship. Guevara became the captain during his senior year. During his senior year, Guevara captained the team to upset three Division II teams: Cal Poly (70–63), UC Davis (78–39), and Humboldt State (now Cal Poly Humboldt) (63–52). Additionally, the Poets won 17 straight games and finished with an undefeated 8–0 conference record, and captured an automatic berth into the 1959 NAIA basketball tournament. Guevara earned all-SCIAC second team honors. Guevara graduated with a Bachelor of Arts degree in political science with a minor in Physical education in 1959 and a Master of Education degree circa 1959 to 1966 both from Whittier.

== Coaching career ==
=== Whittier ===
==== Freshmen Coach (1959-1968) ====
After graduation, Guevara became the head coach of the Poets' freshmen team as late as October 21, 1959. By March 4, 1960, he finished the 1959–60 season with a 22–3 record. Through 9 years, he finished with a 190–54 record, and won 5 regular season championships.

At the conclusion of the 1967–68 season, Guevara was promoted to become the head coach of the varsity team replacing his former coach Aubrey Bonham.

==== Promotion to Head Coach (1968-1971) ====
In his first season, the Poets defeated Division II San Fernando Valley State (100–95) and Cal State Fullerton (82–75), and won the Kris Kringle Klassic championship: a defunct college basketball showcase tournament that took place in Fullerton, California. The Poets also won the Chico Invitational Basketball Tournament (CIBT) by beating Chico State (72–70), snapped a 16-game losing streak all-time against San Diego State, and beat San Diego (92–62). The Poets, under Guevara, finished with an undefeated 8–0 record in conference play and won the District 3 championship to clinch the Poets' berth to the 1969 NAIA basketball tournament for the first time since 1959.

In his second season, the Poets went back to the CIBT and defeated a nationally ranked Division II Southwest Missouri State (59–54) during the semifinals and won the championship defeating Central Washington (59–57). In mid-February, 5 players (including 2 starters) quit the team but that didn't stop the Poets from winning a share of the regular season championship. The Poets then lost to Eastern New Mexico in the first-round game during the 1969-70 NAIA men's basketball tournament.

In August 1970, Guevara and his team were selected by "Project Sports West": an organization run by president Richard Nixon to represent the U.S. in a 3-week tour to Guatemala, El Salvador, Nicaragua, Costa Rica, and Mexico to promote "goodwill through sports" by conducting basketball clinics. In August 15, the Poets played against the Guatemala men's national basketball team in Guatemala City and the Costa Rica men's national basketball team.

In his third season, the Poets went back to the CIBT and defeated Omaha in overtime in the semifinals (87–84) and then losing to Sacramento State in the championship game. By February 13, the Poets clinched the regular season championship for the 3rd consecutive time under Guevara. Guevara won NAIA District 3 Coach of the Year award. Guevara once again clinched a berth to play in the NAIA Tournament where they eliminated by High Point in the second round.

Guevara finished with an overall record of 70–20 and led the Poets to 3 straight SCIAC championships and berths to the NAIA tournament. Two of those wins were during the teams' appearances in 1970 and 1972.

=== San Jose State ===
In 1971, Guevara became the head coach for San Jose State Spartans men's basketball team to replace Dan Glines. Guevara inherited a team that went winless in conference play for the second consecutive time in the In his second year, Guevara upset No. 5 Long Beach State: the program's second win over a Top 5 opponent. Guevara was relieved of his duties at the end of the 1978–79 season.

=== Coaching Record ===
Record table
Season	Team	Overall	Conference	Standing	Postseason
Whittier Poets (Southern California Intercollegiate Athletic Conference) (1968–1971)
1968–69	Whittier	25–5	8–0	1st	NAIA second round
1969–70	Whittier	21–8		T–1st	NAIA first round
1970–71	Whittier	24–7	7–1	1st	NAIA second round
Whittier:		70–20 (.778)			
San Jose State Spartans (Pacific Coast Athletic Association) (1972–1979)
1971–72	San Jose State	11–15	5–7	6th	
1972–73	San Jose State	11–14	6–6	5th	
1973–74	San Jose State	11–15	2–10	7th	
1974–75	San Jose State	16–13	4–6	4th	
1975–76	San Jose State	17–10	5–5	3rd	
1976–77	San Jose State	17–12	8–4	3rd	
1977–78	San Jose State	8–19	4–10	6th	
1978–79	San Jose State	7–20	4–10	7th	
San Jose State:		98–118 (.454)	38–58 (.396)		
Total:		168–138 (.549)			
National champion Postseason invitational champion Conference regular season champion Conference regular season and conference tournament champion Division regular season champion Division regular season and conference tournament champion Conference tournament champion

== Personal life ==
Guevara was also an instructor/teacher at Whittier College's and Montebello High School's physical education classes. During the offseason, Guevara directed a summer basketball league in 1967 and 1969 sponsored by the City of Whittier's Department of Recreation and a track & field event at La Habra High School in 1964.

Guevara has a younger brother named Paul who was born in Los Angeles. Guevara has three sons who all played college basketball at Gavilan College. His family resides at Morgan Hill, California.

=== Personal works ===
Guevara published an article on a book titled "Tips & Ideas for Winning Basketball" by Tom Tarleton called "Selecting a Defense".

Guevara made an educational film called "Whittier's 3-2 Zone Defense".
