= Chuck Oberstein =

American painter (1935–2002)

Chuck Oberstein (December 18, 1935 – May 8, 2002) was an American painter, best known for clown paintings.

== Biography ==
=== Early life and education ===
Chuck Oberstein was born December 18, 1935, in Los Angeles, California. He graduated from Montebello High School.

=== Career ===
He was a jeweler in the family business and once worked at a diamond retail store, when he was encouraged to be an artist by a friend, and quit the same day.

Oberstein is widely regarded as the definitive clown painter. He was sometimes called "The Magician" for his unique superimposing of clown faces and was known for his sparkling tear drop on his sad clowns, especially the Wall Street Journal Clown. Oberstein also painted seascapes, horses, portraits, children, and various other subjects, at first doing landscapes and still life.

Chuck began in Europe and painted over 40 years. He worked in both oil and acrylic, and used live models including many family members as themselves and as clowns. His original art can be seen in prints, lithographs, posters, cards, figurines, and collector plates around the world.

He worked at the Disneyland art gallery, and also at Warner Brothers, quitting there after one day.

His favorite artist was Rembrandt.

At one point he joined the Army, creating murals for the buildings where he was stationed in England.

Chuck put the number 442 in his paintings, sometimes hidden and often obvious in reference to 442 Ackley St. Monterey Park, CA, the place where he first began to paint again after he returned from Europe. For many years he let collectors guess what the 442 was all about and loved not telling and just hearing their guesses.

Oberstein believed clowns represent freedom, because they will do anything. He was a vegetarian and loved jazz, playing the piano, weight lifting, running, golf, skiing, body surfing, dancing, sports, tennis, dogs and horses, family and friends. His whimsical clowns represent the many things he loved in life as well as a deep spiritual knowing that comes through his lighter clowns in his later years. His portraits are of masterpiece quality similar to Rembrandt's style although he painted fewer of these and they are not in print.

=== Marriage and children ===
Oberstein was married twice, first to Loretta Montrose Oberstein, then to Judy Oberstein. He had three children with Loretta: Teri, Chance and Rozy.
