= Myles Kovacs =

Myles Kovacs is an American entrepreneur and cofounder of automotive magazine DUB, founded in 2000. He is of Japanese and Hungarian origin and spent his younger years in East Los Angeles. Kovacs graduated from nearby Schurr High School in Montebello, California.

After DUB magazine, Kovacs has branched out in the urban car scene market with a design for custom wheels that seem to spin when a car is stopped and die-cast toy cars that are sold at Wal-Mart, Toys "R" Us and other chain stores. MTV uses him to produce its MTV Cribs show when it features celebrities' cars.

He started with about $10,000 — put together with two partners — and practical experience learned from high school jobs that included delivering customized cars to Los Angeles-area celebrities and writing a newsletter about hip-hop clubs around the nation. He started DUB magazine first, then used it as a way to promote his other enterprises. Today, Kovacs advises corporate executives, trade groups and car lovers on the growing auto customizing market. Among the companies he has consulted for are Honda and Coca-Cola.

Myles Kovacs and wife Cynthia Kovacs have recently been on Fox's reality series, The Secret Millionaire, in which $150,000 of their own money was given away to deserving people.
