= Schurr High School =

Coordinates: 34.027512°N 118.1225697°W

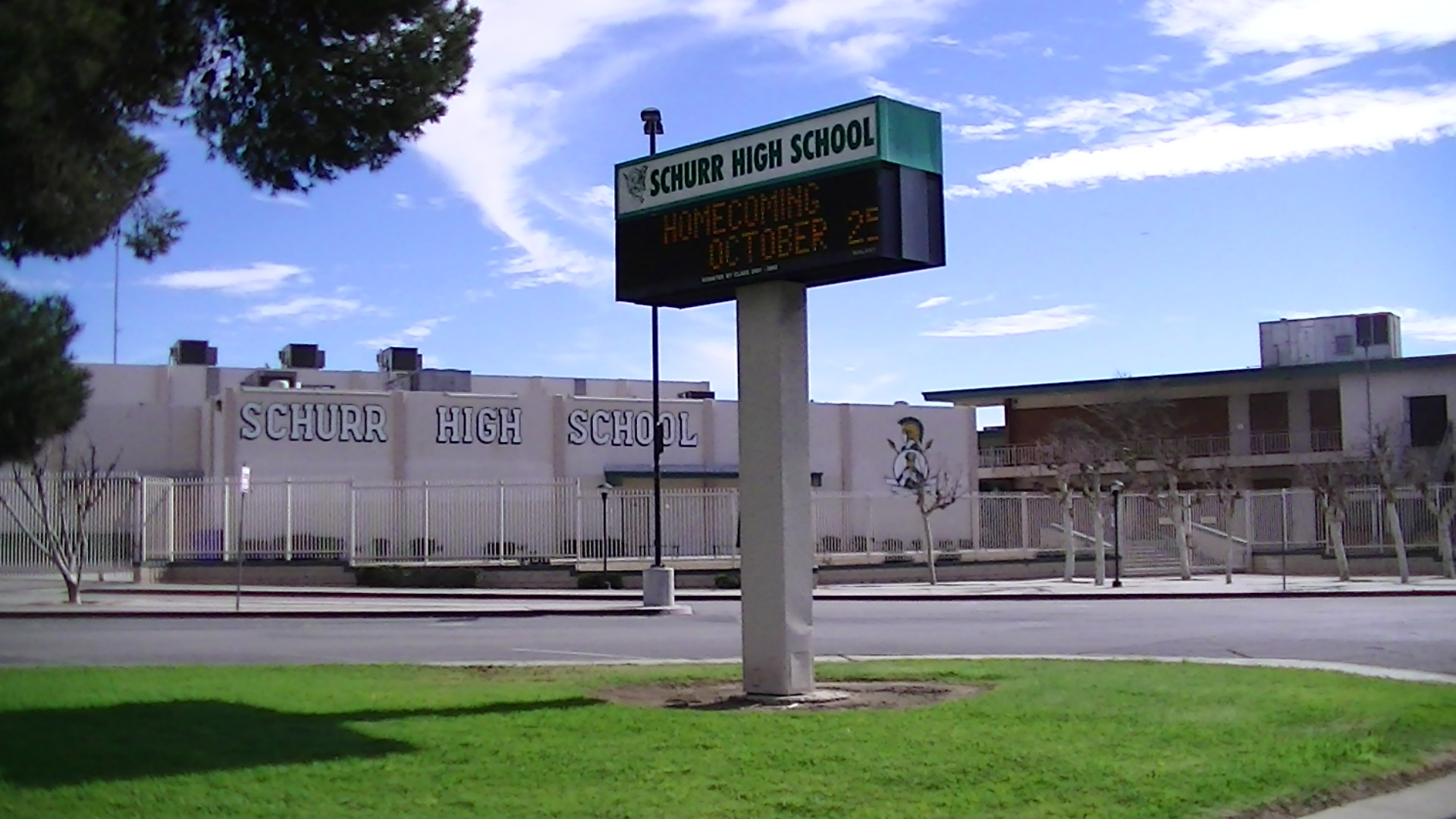

Location
- 820 North Wilcox Avenue; Montebello, California 90640; United States

Information
- Type: Public
- Established: 1962 as Schurr Junior High School, converted to a high school in 1971.
- School district: Montebello Unified School District
- Principal: Larry McKiernan Gonzalez
- Grades: 9–12
- Enrollment: 2,139 (2023–2024)
- Campus: Suburban
- Color
- Athletics conference: CIF Southern Section; Almont League
- Team name: Spartans
- Newspaper: Spartan Scroll
- Yearbook: Spectrum
- Website: Official website

Schurr High School is a public high school in Montebello, California, United States, a suburb in the Los Angeles metropolitan area. Part of the Montebello Unified School District, it has an enrollment of approximately 3,500 students in grades 9–12. The majority of students attending this school live in the Montebello and Monterey Park area, while some also come from neighboring cities and communities such as Commerce, East Los Angeles, South El Monte and Rosemead. Schurr was established as a high school in 1971, with the campus having previously been the site of a junior high school.

== Overview ==
The school, which sits atop a hillside just east of the border with Monterey Park, was named for George Miller Schurr, a former board member of the Montebello Unified School District. The school previously served as Schurr Junior High School, but due to the growing population of students in the area and the significant distance from the two local public high schools at the time Montebello High School and Mark Keppel High School in Alhambra, California the school became a high school in 1971. The first principal was Walter Wohlheter.

Most of the students who attend Schurr come from either Jack F. Macy Intermediate School, which is located in the city of Monterey Park, or Eastmont Intermediate School, which is located in East Los Angeles, just a few blocks from the Montebello city border. Due to Schurr sitting atop a hill, it is said that Macy students simply "climb the hill" upon graduation from middle school. While Macy and Eastmont students maintain a rivalry both academically and athletically, their differences are generally considered to be put to rest once they become acclimated to Schurr and one another.

Schurr High School was originally built to accommodate 1,700 students. Schurr's population has nearly doubled, and school officials expect that during the 2015–2018 school years, the population will increase to around 3,700 students.

The Alma Mater is based on the National Anthem of Russia and the words were written by music and history/government teacher David A. Lebow (1971–2003). Band director, Barry Ulrich (1973–1986) composed the fight song, "Taco Mambo", which is played by the Spartan Legion at home athletic events and school rallies.

The Schurr High School mascot is known as Sammy the Spartan, and the school's students and alumni are referred to as Spartans.

During the 2017–2018 school year, solar panels were added to portions of both the teacher and student parking lots.

In August 2021 the school was closed due to a rat infestation.

In June 2026, the school won a national championship title for esports in Street Fighter 6.

== Extracurricular activities ==
Schurr High School offers and encourage students to participate in a variety of sports, clubs, and after school programs that foster critical thinking and problems solving skills. Schurr High School students take part in more than 30 clubs and activities, including Astronomy Club, Green Earth Club, Plant Posse, Drama, National Honor Society, and Gaming Association.

Schurr High School also has a competing marching band, color guard, and drill team.

== Athletics ==
The sports teams are referred to as the "Schurr High Spartans." The school official colors are green and white, with gold being an unofficial accent color. The school has an athletic rivalry with nearby Montebello High School. The rivalry is intensified by several geographical reasons, such as the fact that both schools are located on N. Wilcox Ave. and are separated by only a few blocks, so close in fact that depending on where someone stands on either campus, the other school is visible.

The campus is divided into two levels, with the upstairs level serving as the home for the physical education department as well as the home of all the athletic venues, such as Ken Davis field (football, soccer, track and field), two separate gymnasiums for basketball and volleyball which are shared between both sports, the baseball field, the softball field, enclosed tennis courts, and the outdoor aquatics center that was built in 2012 and has an Olympic sized pool.

The school's most noteworthy athletic organizations are the football, wrestling, cross country, and track and field teams.

The Spartans football team won the California Interscholastic Federation championship in Division 5A in 1980, and 2006, with the later win coming against Santa Fe High School. The 2006 game was played in Fullerton, CA. During the 2016–2017 school year, the girl's water polo team won the CIF title by defeating Riverside Poly High School 6–4. A scoreboard for the baseball field was added in for the 2014 school year. In the year 2015, the football field began undergoing long-awaited renovations to transition to an artificial turf surface.

== Notable alumni ==
=== Government and politics ===
- Todd Spitzer, 1978: Orange County, California politician

=== Arts, sciences, and education ===
- Catherine J. K. Sandoval, 1980: first Latina Rhodes Scholar and Associate Professor at Santa Clara University School of Law.

=== Sports and entertainment ===
- Bobby Logan, 1973: writer, producer and director of TV and films, including Meatballs 4 and Repossessed, starring Leslie Nielsen and Linda Blair
- Lorin Sklamberg, 1974: member of the Klezmatics and winner of a Grammy Award
- Ada Maris, 1975: actress
- Daryn Okada, 1978: cinematographer and director of photography
- Ramona Pagel, 1979: American record holder in the shot put
- Rodney Eastman, 1985: Canadian actor best known for playing Joey Crusel in A Nightmare on Elm Street 3: Dream Warriors and sequel A Nightmare on Elm Street 4: The Dream Master
- Vanessa Marquez, 1986: actress best known for playing Wendy Goldman in ER and Ana Delgado in Stand and Deliver
- Myles Kovacs, 1991: founder/president of DUB Magazine
- Jay Hernandez, 1996: actor best known for his roles as Brian Chavez in the film Friday Night Lights and Chato Santana / El Diablo in the film Suicide Squad
- Sergio Mora, 1997: winner of television boxing show The Contender and former WBC light middleweight champion
- Jason Chung, 2003: aka Nosaj Thing, a Korean American electronic musician based in Los Angeles County, California; self-released his first EP Views/Octopus in 2006, and released his debut LP, Drift, on Alpha Pup Records in 2009
