= Catherine Sandoval =

American lawyer

Cathy Sandoval
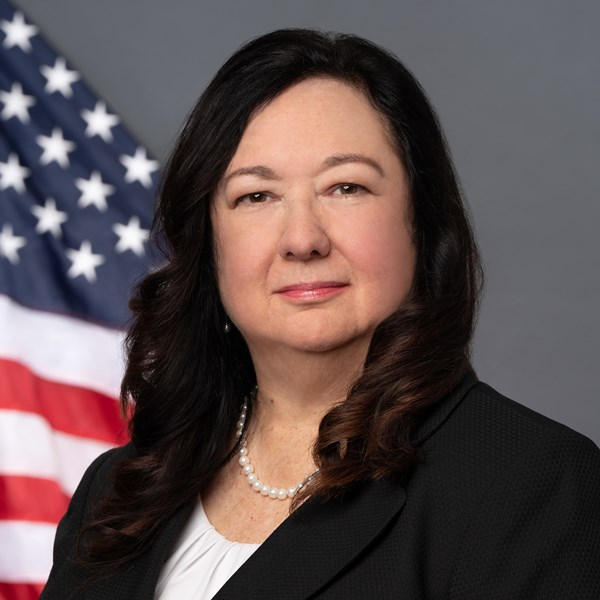
- Born: Catherine Janet Kissee; Los Angeles, California, U.S.
- Education: Yale University (BA); St Antony's College, Oxford (MLitt); Stanford University (JD)

Catherine Janet Kissee Sandoval is a former commissioner of the California Public Utilities Commission. Sandoval is a professor at Santa Clara University School of Law. As of February 2023, she has served as a member of the U.S. Chemical Safety and Hazard Investigation Board. In 1984, she was the first Latina Rhodes scholar.

== Early life ==
Sandoval was born in Los Angeles, California, to Vernon Kissee, a court reporter from Missouri, and Helen Sandoval; a woman born and raised in Arizona. Her maternal grandfather was born in Guanajuato, Mexico. Along with an older and a younger sister, Sandoval was brought up in Boyle Heights, Los Angeles.

In a Los Angeles Times opinion article, she recalled in 1991 that her elementary school, Dacotah Street School (now Christopher Dena Elementary School), was 95% Hispanic and that:

While I was in the first grade, the principal somehow determined that all the students were mentally retarded. Working with other parents, my mother and father fought the label and got the state to test us. The tests revealed that few, if any, of us were "retarded" and some were gifted. I shudder to think about how things would have turned out if our parents had not fought that "retarded" label.

Sandoval's family moved a few miles eastward to Montebello, where she attended Eastmont Intermediate School and Schurr High School.

== Education ==
Sandoval entered Yale University in 1978. She served on the Minority Admissions Advisory Committee where she noted that about 35% of the Hispanic students at Yale dropped out, compared to only 5% of the total student population. In 1984 she graduated magna cum laude with a Bachelor of Arts degree in Latin American Studies. Encouraged by her teachers and a Rhodes scholar, she applied for and received a Rhodes scholarship—the first female Latin-American recipient. Sandoval entered Oxford University in October 1984 on her scholarship and studied global politics, forming a thesis regarding U.S. and Western European policy toward Nicaragua and El Salvador. In 1983–84, she studied the record of Latinos enrolled in Ivy League schools. At Oxford, she rowed on the crew team and she lettered in varsity basketball. In 1987, she left Oxford for Stanford Law School. There, she served on the Stanford Law Review and the Stanford Journal of International Law. Sandoval co-chaired the Stanford Latino Law Students Association. In 1990 after three years at Stanford, she completed the thesis work she had started as a Rhodes scholar, and was awarded a Master of Letters in Politics from Oxford. The same year, she earned a J.D. degree from Stanford Law School.

== Career ==
Following Stanford, Sandoval served for a year in Pasadena as law clerk to Judge Dorothy Wright Nelson of the United States Court of Appeals for the Ninth Circuit. After being admitted to the State Bar of California in July 1991, Sandoval was an associate litigator of Munger, Tolles & Olson, a law firm in Los Angeles. As a board member of the Villa Malaga Housing Corporation, she managed a $2 million project funded by the United States Department of Housing and Urban Development (HUD) which provided housing for people with disabilities in East Los Angeles. Sandoval served on the Los Angeles County Commission on Judicial Procedures, and she co-chaired the Subcommittee on Rating and Underwriting, part of the California Insurance Commission's Anti-Discrimination Task Force under John Garamendi.

In March 1994, Sandoval was named Special Assistant to the Federal Communications Commission (FCC), working in the FCC's Office of International Communications, overseeing FCC policy in Latin America and developing countries. She directed the FCC's Office of Communications Business Opportunities as deputy director from August 1994 then as full director from August 1995 to March 1999. In this position, she helped small businesses, especially minority-owned communications firms, gain greater access to FCC licensing. "For her distinguished public service, Sandoval received the FCC Chairman's Special Achievement Award in 1997, and the 1998 Patrice Johnson Award for Excellence in Public Service from the National Association of Black Telecommunications Professionals."

Sandoval worked in the private sector from 1999 to 2001, serving as vice president and general counsel for Z-Spanish Media Corporation, a conglomerate of Spanish-language radio stations, news outlets and outdoor advertising. During this time, Z-Spanish Media was sold to Spanish-language broadcaster Entravision Communications for approximately $448 million.

From 2001 to 2004, Sandoval was an undersecretary with the California Business, Transportation and Housing Agency, serving as senior policy advisor for housing. Sandoval is currently an active member of the California Bar Association, and was admitted to membership in 1991 after passing the bar in fall 1990.

In 2004, Sandoval joined the faculty of Santa Clara University School of Law as a tenure-track professor, teaching telecommunications law, antitrust law, and contract law. She researched and published studies examining minority and female ownership in media, antitrust, and communications law issues. For the school year 2012–2013, Sandoval is on a partial leave of absence from Santa Clara Law. During this time, Sandoval taught a course in telecommunications law at UC Berkeley School of Law.

=== California Public Utilities ===
In January 2011, California Governor Jerry Brown named Sandoval to a six-year position as one of five commissioners on the California Public Utilities Commission (CPUC), based in San Francisco. She is the first female Hispanic to serve on the CPUC. The board oversees rates and rules for privately owned electric, gas, water, telecommunications, rail and passenger transportation utilities. She and the CPUC have been tasked with beginning the process of increasing the ratio of renewable energy use in California to 33% of total energy consumption by 2020.

Sandoval convened rulemaking workshops in 2011 to analyze the proposed merger of AT&T and T-Mobile which would combine their customer base encompassing 47% of California's mobile phone market. The CPUC's investigation examined whether the merger would serve the public interest under California law in light of T-Mobile's large market share in California. The hearings were seen as creating a precedent that would inform federal investigators seeking to block the merger, according to Dan Morain, columnist for the Sacramento Bee.

=== Chemical Safety Board ===
In June 2022, President Joe Biden nominated Sandoval to be a member of the U.S. Chemical Safety and Hazard Investigation Board. On November 17, 2022, the United States Senate Committee on Environment and Public Works held hearings on her nomination. On December 13, 2022, the United States Senate discharged the committee from further consideration of the nomination by unanimous consent agreement, and confirmed the nomination by voice vote. She was sworn in on February 2, 2023.

== Personal life ==
Sandoval lives in Campbell, California, with her husband Steve Smith.

Sandoval has been involved with nonprofit organizations, including Comisión Femenil Mexicana Nacional which was formed to help U.S. Latinas seeking higher education. A similar group—Olga Talamante's Chicana/Latina Foundation—honored Sandoval with its Legacy Award in 2011. Diplomat Vilma Socorro Martínez and Judge Dorothy W. Nelson are two of Sandoval's heroes.

== Publications ==
- Sandoval, Catherine J. K. (2006). "Antitrust law on the borderland of language and market definition: is there a separate Spanish-language radio market?" (PDF). University of San Francisco Law Review. 40: 381–449. Archived from the original (PDF) on 2010-05-30.
- Sandoval, Catherine; Hammond, Allen S. IV (2007). "Understanding Barriers to Entry for Minority and Female Broadcasters". In Phillip Napoli (ed.). Media Diversity and Localism: Meanings and Metrics. Routledge. Archived from the original on 2011-08-29.
- Sandoval, Catherine J. K. (2008). "Antitrust Language Barriers: First Amendment Constraints on Defining an Antitrust Market by a Broadcast's Language, and Its Implications for Audiences, Competition, and Democracy" (PDF). Federal Communications Law Journal. 60: 407–480. Archived from the original (PDF) on 2008-09-07.
- Sandoval, Catherine J. K. (2009). "Disclosure, Deception, and Deep-Packet Inspection: The Role of the Federal Trade Commission Act's Deceptive Conduct Prohibitions in the Net Neutrality Debate". Fordham Law Review. 78 (2): 641.
- Sandoval, Catherine J.K. (2010). "Minority Commercial Radio Ownership". In Phillip M. Napoli, Minna Aslama (ed.). Communications Research in Action: Scholar-Activist Collaborations for a Democratic Public Sphere. Fordham University Press. pp. 88–113. ISBN 978-0-8232-3347-2.
- Sandoval, Catherine J.K. (2010). "Pharmaceutical Reverse Payment Settlements: Presumptions, Procedural Burdens, and Covenants Not to Sue Generic Drug Manufacturers" (PDF). Santa Clara Computer & High Technology Law Journal. 26: 141–183. Archived from the original (PDF) on 2012-04-21.
