= Dub (magazine) =

Automotive magazine based in the United States

DUB
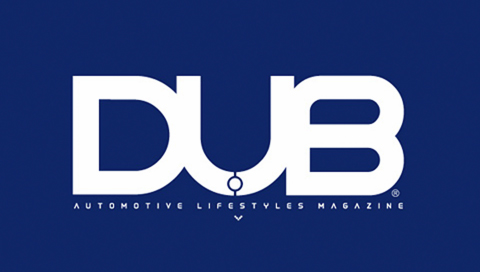
- First issue: 2000
- Company: DUB Publishing
- Country: U.S.
- Based in: Santa Fe Springs, California
- Website: dubmagazine.com

DUB is a North American magazine covering urban custom car culture and also features celebrities and their vehicles.

== Background ==
DUB was founded in January 2000 by Myles Kovacs, Haythem Haddad, and Herman Flores, who continue to head the company located in Santa Fe Springs, California.

The magazine also launched the DUB Magazine Custom Auto Show & Concert, a nationwide car show and concert tour that spans 16 United States cities. DUB now has many licensed goods that include Jada Toys' DUB City die-cast and radio-controlled vehicles, DUB Edition car accessories, and Rockstar Games' Midnight Club 3: DUB Edition video game.

The term "DUB" is street slang for custom wheels 20" or larger in diameter and was popularized through hip-hop music.

== See also ==
- Dub (wheel)
