= Montebello Unified School District =

School district in California, United States

Address
- 123 South Montebello Boulevard Montebello, California, 90640; United States

District information
- Type: Public
- Grades: KG–12
- Schools: 29
- NCES District ID: 0625470

Students and staff
- Students: 19,195 (2025–2026)
- Teachers: 952.33 (on an FTE basis) (2025–2026)
- Staff: 1,899.49 (on an FTE basis) (2025–2026)
- Student–teacher ratio: 20.16 (2025–2026)

Other information
- Website: www.montebello.k12.ca.us

Montebello Unified School District is a school district based in Montebello, California, United States.

Montebello USD serves the city of Montebello, portions of the cities of Bell Gardens, Commerce, Downey, Monterey Park, Pico Rivera, Rosemead, and a part of the unincorporated community of East Los Angeles as well as the unincorporated community of South San Gabriel. A portion of Bell lies within the district limits, but it has no residents.

== Board of education ==
Montebello Unified School District's Board of Education election is held on a Tuesday after the first Monday in November of even-numbered years. The election is a plurality election and board of education members are elected to a four-year term.

== Schools ==
=== Secondary schools ===
==== High schools ====
Zoned:

- Bell Gardens High School
- Montebello High School
- Schurr High School, Montebello

Unzoned:

- Applied Technology Center
- Vail Continuation High School

==== Intermediate schools ====
- Bell Gardens Intermediate School
- Eastmont Intermediate School, Montebello/East Los Angeles
- Jack F. Macy Intermediate School, Monterey Park
- La Merced Intermediate School, Montebello
- Montebello Intermediate School
- Suva Intermediate School, Bell Gardens

=== Primary schools ===
- Bandini Elementary School, Commerce
- Bella Vista Elementary School, Monterey Park
- Bell Gardens Elementary School
- Cesar Chavez Elementary School, Bell Gardens
- Fremont Elementary School, Montebello
- Garfield Elementary School, Bell Gardens
- Greenwood Elementary School, Montebello
- Joseph A. Gascon Elementary School, East Los Angeles
- La Merced Academy School, Montebello
- Montebello Gardens Elementary School, Pico Rivera
- Montebello Park Elementary School, East Los Angeles
- Potrero Heights Elementary School, South San Gabriel
- Rosewood Park STEAM Academy (K-8), Commerce
- Suva Elementary School, Bell Gardens
- Washington Elementary School, 2016 Gold Ribbon School, Montebello
- Wilcox Elementary School, Montebello
- Winter Gardens Elementary School, East Los Angeles
