= Montebello, California =

City in California, United States

- City
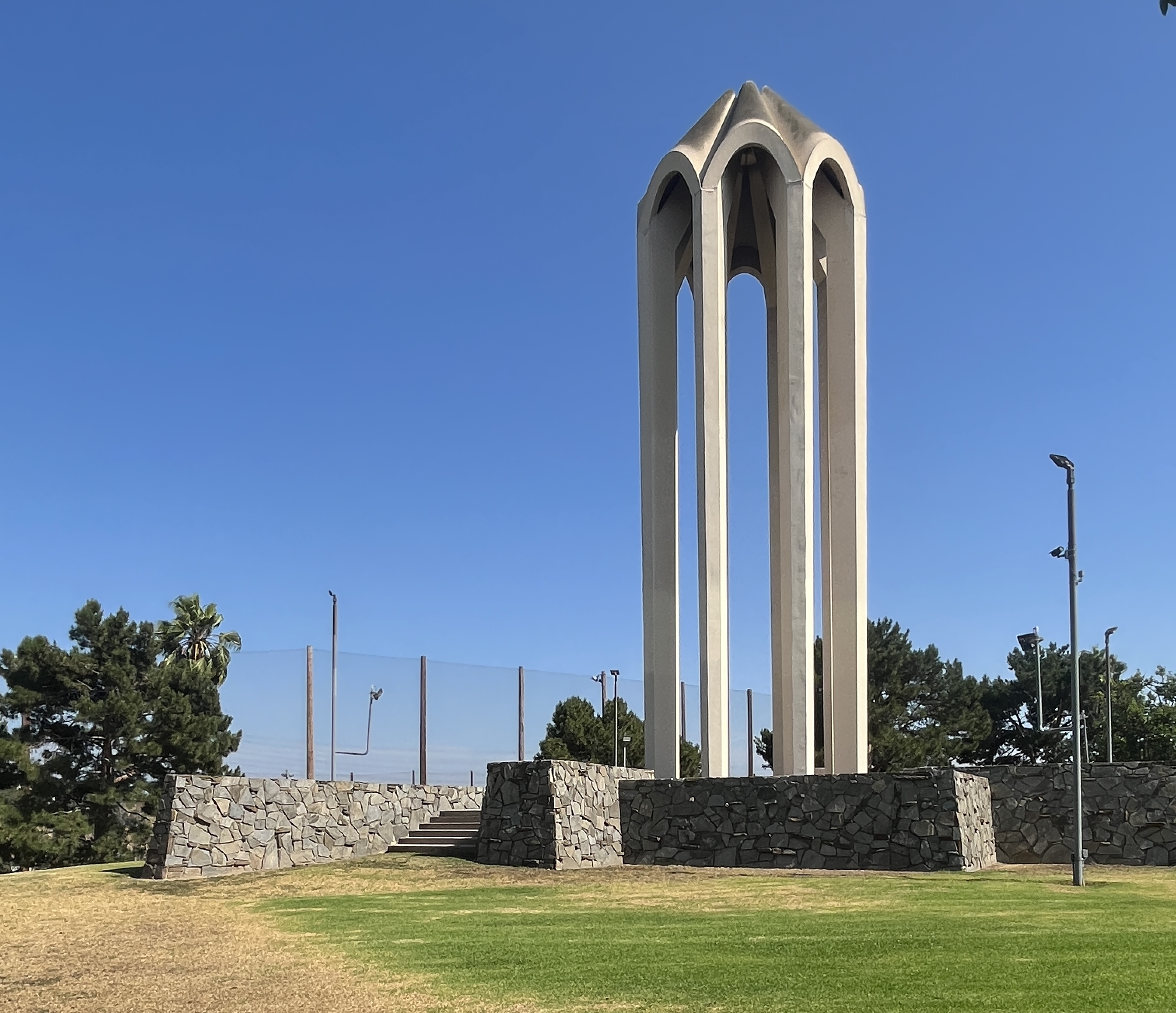

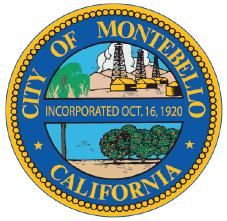
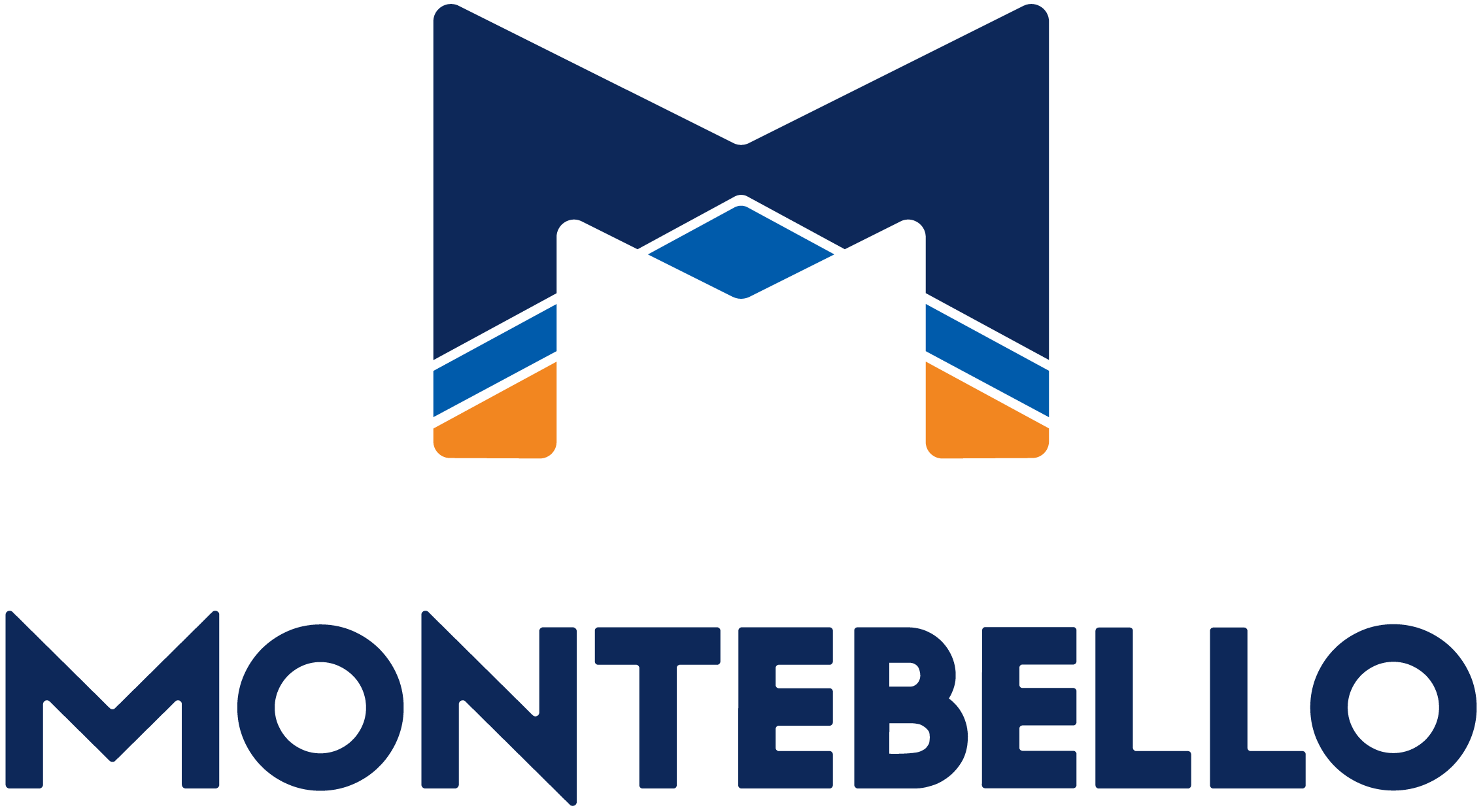
- Seal
- Interactive map of Montebello, California
- Location of Montebello in Los Angeles Metro Area Location of Montebello in California Location of Montebello in the United States
- Coordinates: 34°0′56″N 118°6′39″W
- Country: United States
- State: California
- County: Los Angeles
- Incorporated: October 16, 1920

Government
  - Type: Council-Manager
  - Mayor: Georgina Tamayo
  - City Manager: Raul Alvarez

Area
  - Total: 8.37 sq mi (21.67 km^{2})
  - Land: 8.33 sq mi (21.57 km^{2})
  - Water: 0.039 sq mi (0.10 km^{2}) 0.48%
- Elevation: 203 ft (62 m)

Population (2020)
  - Total: 62,640
  - Estimate (July 2024): 60,617
  - Density: 7,435.67/sq mi (2,870.93/km^{2})
- Time zone: UTC-8 (PST)
  - Summer (DST): UTC-7 (PDT)
- ZIP Code: 90640
- Area code: 213 and 323
- FIPS code: 06-48816
- GNIS feature IDs: 1656573, 2411144
- Website: montebelloca.gov

Montebello (Italian and Spanish for "Beautiful Mountain") is a city in Los Angeles County, California, United States, located just east of East Los Angeles and southwest of San Gabriel Valley. It is 8 mi (13 km) east of downtown Los Angeles. It is considered part of the Gateway Cities and San Gabriel Valley Cities, and is a member of the Gateway Cities Council of Governments and the San Gabriel Valley Council of Governments.

In the early 20th century, Montebello was a well-known source for oil reserves. At the 2020 census, the population estimate was 63,833. The population estimate for July 1, 2024, was 60,617.

== History ==
Historic occupants of the land along the Rio Hondo River were the indigenous Tongva (also known as Gabrielino), a portion of the Uto-Aztecan family of Native Americans. The Tongva occupied much of the Los Angeles basin and the southern Channel Islands - Santa Catalina, San Nicolas, San Clemente and Santa Barbara.

When the explorer Juan Rodríguez Cabrillo arrived off the shores of Santa Catalina in 1542, he was met by the Tongva people. Because the language of the Tongva was different from the neighboring tribes, the Spanish called them "Gabrielino." As more non-natives arrived and established settlements, diseases that were endemic among them caused high mortality among the Tongva and other indigenous peoples. These were new infectious diseases to them. By 1870, the area had few remaining indigenous inhabitants.

Father Angel Somera and Father Pedro Cambon, both Franciscan missionaries, founded the original Mission San Gabriel Arcángel, called Mission Vieja, on September 8, 1771. Today the site is near the intersection of San Gabriel Boulevard and the Rio Hondo River. The establishment of this mission marked the beginning of settlement by Spaniards in the Los Angeles region; it was the fourth of twenty-one missions that they ultimately established along California's El Camino Real. The mission did well initially as a farm and cattle ranch.

Six years after its founding, however, a destructive flood led the mission fathers to relocate the mission farther north, to its current location in what is the present day city of San Gabriel. The original mission site is California Historical Landmark #161.

During the early years of the mission's operations, the region was managed by Spanish colonists who had a "Rancho" land grant system. The current city of Montebello consists of land from Rancho San Antonio, Rancho La Merced, and Rancho Paso de Bartolo. The Juan Matias Sanchez Adobe, built in 1844, still stands at the center of old Rancho la Merced in East Montebello. Rancho la Merced is the city's oldest standing structure.

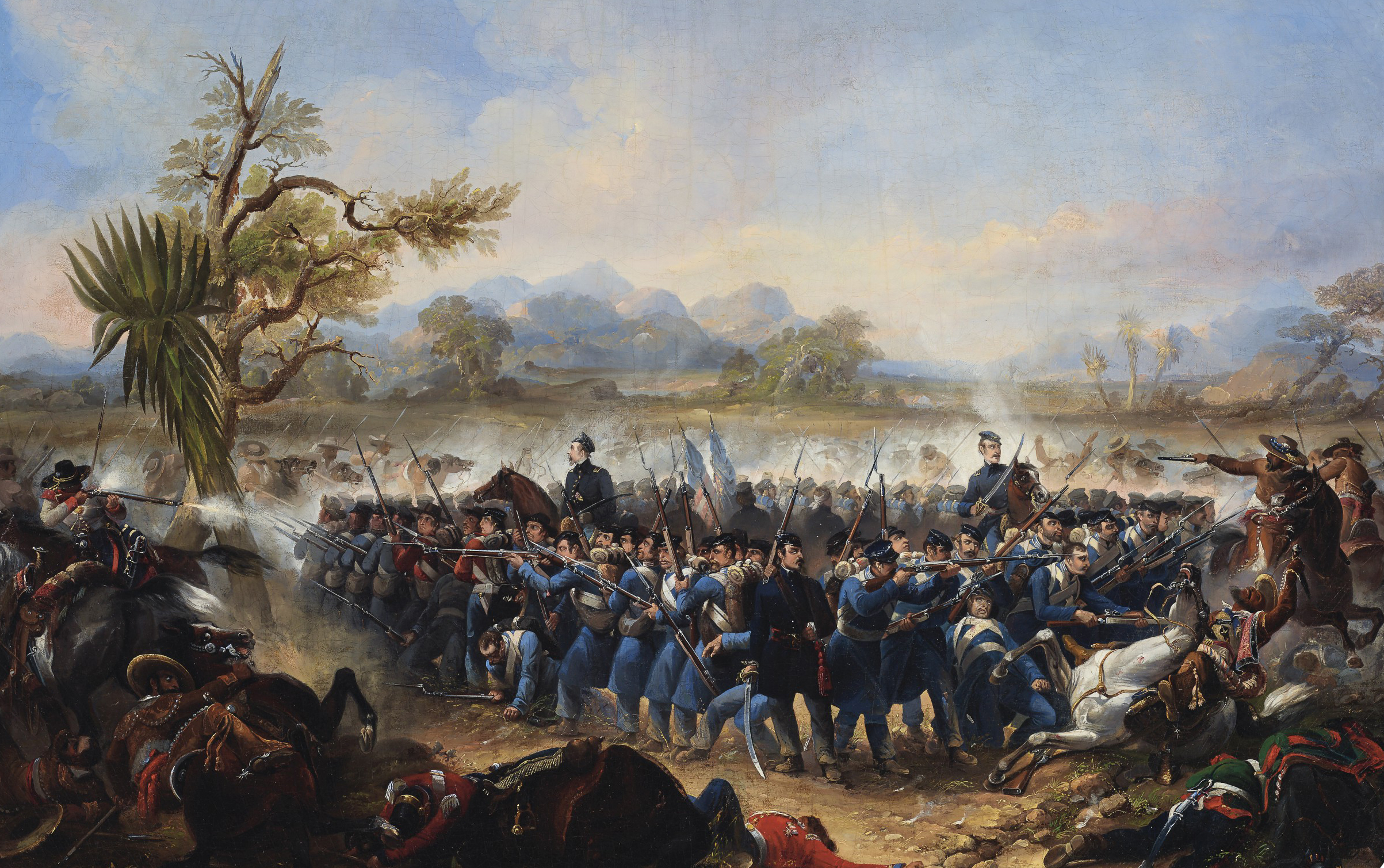
The 1847 Battle of Río San Gabriel was a decisive victory of American forces against the Californios during the U.S. conquest of California.

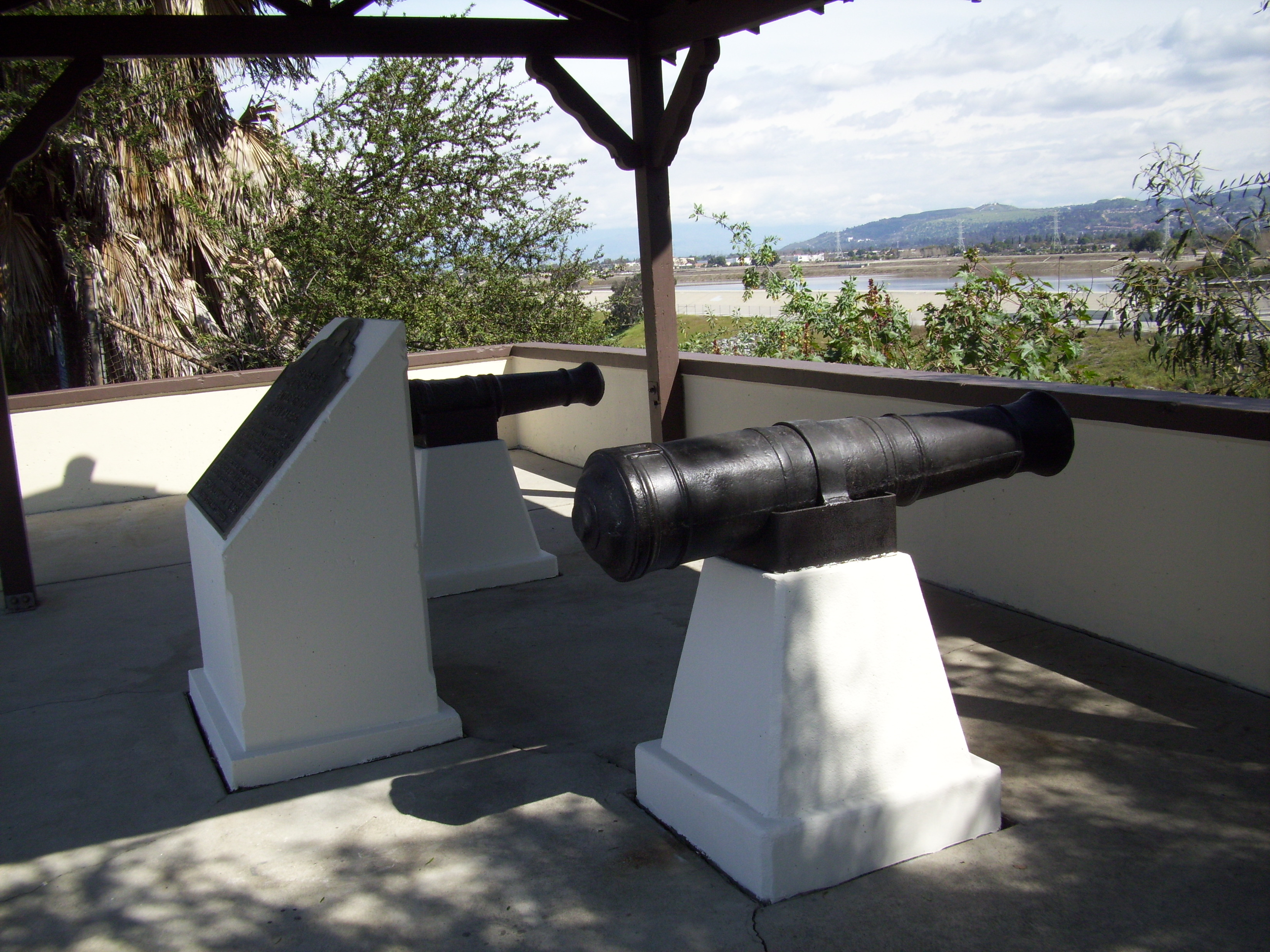
Battle of Río San Gabriel cannons and memorial in Montebello.

On January 8, 1847, the Battle of Río San Gabriel took place in what are today parts of the cities of Whittier, Pico Rivera and Montebello. The battle was a decisive, critical victory for the U.S. Army in the Mexican–American War. The United States took control of Los Angeles and Alta California. Today, the site is noted as California State Historical Landmark #385. Two cannons and a plaque commemorating the battle were installed overlooking the river at Bluff Road and Washington Boulevard.

Following the American Civil War, some 5,000 acres (2,000 ha) of the East Los Angeles area was owned by Alessandro Repetto, an Italian immigrant from Genoa, Italy. Following Repetto's death in 1885, his brother sold his rancho to a consortium of five Los Angeles businessmen, including banker Isaias W. Hellman and wholesale grocer/historian Harris Newmark, for $60,000, or approximately $12 per acre. The land was later divided among the partners, one large parcel of approximately 2,000 acres (810 ha) going to a partnership of Newmark and his nephew, banker Kaspare Cohn.

The city of Montebello was developed in May 1899 from the Newmark and Cohn share of 1,200 acres (490 ha). After the partners received the advice of hydraulic engineer William Mulholland for the design and building of the town's water system, they subdivided the land. In 1900 the completed water system was incorporated as the Montebello Land and Water Company.

An area of 200 acres (81 ha) adjacent to the tracks of what was formerly the San Pedro, Los Angeles & Salt Lake Railroad was developed into a townsite called Newmark. It was bounded by Los Angeles Avenue on the south, 1st Street on the east, Cleveland Avenue on the north, and 5th Street on the west. The remainder of the land was subdivided into 5 acres (2.0 ha) lots suitable for small-scale agriculture. On William Mulholland's suggestion, leaders of the city adopted Montebello as the name in 1920, replacing Newmark.

Originally an agricultural community, the city was known for its prolific production of flowers, berries, fruits, and vegetables. The first public flower show in 1912 was sponsored by the Montebello Women's Club and held in the Montebello High School auditorium on Whittier Boulevard. The Montebello – El Carmel (South Montebello) Improvement Association, the predecessor of the Montebello Chamber of Commerce, operated from September 1907 to April 1912, with the purpose "to improve and beautify the community." Some of its early achievements included: paving Whittier Boulevard, having trees planted along the streets, establishing the city's first high school, and having the entire area incorporated as "The City of Montebello".

On October 16, 1920, the city was incorporated. In honor of Montebello's agricultural roots, the city's official seal contains a red poinsettia in the center. In the first half of the 20th century, much of south Montebello was populated by Japanese-American farmers. During World War II, most were interned hundreds of miles away at camps in harsh areas under direction by President Franklin D. Roosevelt by Executive Order 9066. Many of the displaced residents were unable to return to their homes; survivors and their descendants did not receive an official apology or compensation until the late 20th century.

The Standard Oil Company discovered oil in the Montebello hills in 1917 on the Baldwin and Temple properties; this discovery changed the face of the city. Oil fields replaced agriculture. Eventually, the oil pumped from this find produced one-eighth of the crude oil in California. Over the course of sixty years, the Montebello hills were filled with producing oil wells.

In 1972, artist Millard Sheets designed a mosaic mural for the front entrance of the Home Savings of America branch in Montebello. The mural depicts local recreational activities such as kite-flying, picnicking, and horseback riding. The colorful meadow and flowering branches are references to the town's flower farms, hence the onetime motto: "The City of Flowers With an Oil Well Payroll."

On March 22, 2023, a high-end EF1 tornado struck the city, damaging 17 structures and injuring one person. According to the National Weather Service, it was the strongest tornado to hit the LA Metro area since March 1983.

== Geography ==
Montebello is located 8 mi (13 km) east of downtown Los Angeles. The city is considered to be part of the Gateway Cities while the northern part of the city is in the San Gabriel Valley. The surrounding cities are Monterey Park, South San Gabriel, and Rosemead to the north, Commerce to the south, Pico Rivera to the east, and Los Angeles and East Los Angeles to the west. The city is a member of the Gateway Cities Council of Governments.

According to the United States Census Bureau, the city has a total area of 8.4 sq mi (22 km^{2}), of which 8.3 sq mi (21 km^{2}) are land and 0.04 sq mi (0.10 km^{2}) or 0.48% is water.

=== Climate ===
Climate data for Montebello, California
Month	Jan	Feb	Mar	Apr	May	Jun	Jul	Aug	Sep	Oct	Nov	Dec	Year
Record high °F (°C)	91 (33)	95 (35)	100 (38)	104 (40)	105 (41)	108 (42)	108 (42)	106 (41)	113 (45)	106 (41)	100 (38)	88 (31)	113 (45)
Mean daily maximum °F (°C)	69.7 (20.9)	71.3 (21.8)	72.6 (22.6)	77.4 (25.2)	79.2 (26.2)	84.2 (29.0)	88.9 (31.6)	89.4 (31.9)	87.5 (30.8)	82.2 (27.9)	75.2 (24.0)	70.7 (21.5)	79.0 (26.1)
Mean daily minimum °F (°C)	47.9 (8.8)	48.7 (9.3)	50.5 (10.3)	53.1 (11.7)	56.9 (13.8)	60.9 (16.1)	64.3 (17.9)	65.4 (18.6)	63.8 (17.7)	58.4 (14.7)	52.0 (11.1)	47.3 (8.5)	55.8 (13.2)
Record low °F (°C)	30 (−1)	29 (−2)	30 (−1)	32 (0)	33 (1)	38 (3)	39 (4)	44 (7)	50 (10)	44 (7)	37 (3)	30 (−1)	29 (−2)
Average precipitation inches (mm)	3.53 (90)	3.60 (91)	2.94 (75)	0.90 (23)	0.23 (5.8)	0.06 (1.5)	0.01 (0.25)	0.02 (0.51)	0.17 (4.3)	0.31 (7.9)	1.00 (25)	1.67 (42)	14.44 (367)
Source: www.wrcc.dri.edu/cgi-bin/cliMAIN.pl?ca5790

== Demographics ==
Historical population
Census	Pop.	Note	%±
1930	5,498		—
1940	8,016		45.8%
1950	21,735		171.1%
1960	32,097		47.7%
1970	42,807		33.4%
1980	52,929		23.6%
1990	59,564		12.5%
2000	62,150		4.3%
2010	62,500		0.6%
2020	62,640		0.2%
U.S. Decennial Census; 1860–1870 1880-1890; 1900 1910 1920; 1930 1940 1950; 1960 1970 1980; 1990 2000 2010; 2020

Montebello first appeared as a city in the 1930 U.S. Census as part of the newly-formed but now defunct Montebello Township (1930 pop. 38,641).

=== Racial and ethnic composition ===
Montebello city, California – Racial and ethnic composition Note: the US Census treats Hispanic/Latino as an ethnic category. This table excludes Latinos from the racial categories and assigns them to a separate category. Hispanics/Latinos may be of any race.
Race / Ethnicity (NH = Non-Hispanic)	Pop 1980	Pop 1990	Pop 2000	Pop 2010	Pop 2020	% 1980	% 1990	% 2000	% 2010	% 2020
White alone (NH)	13,796	9,981	6,911	5,325	4,460	26.07%	16.76%	11.12%	8.52%	7.12%
Black or African American alone (NH)	233	486	395	380	472	0.44%	0.82%	0.64%	0.61%	0.75%
Native American or Alaska Native alone (NH)	148	100	141	99	106	0.28%	0.17%	0.23%	0.16%	0.17%
Asian alone (NH)	7,380	8,566	7,075	6,646	7,793	13.94%	14.38%	11.38%	10.63%	12.44%
Native Hawaiian or Pacific Islander alone (NH)	7,380	8,566	24	37	66	13.94%	14.38%	0.04%	0.06%	0.11%
Other race alone (NH)	76	168	70	65	196	0.14%	0.28%	0.11%	0.10%	0.31%
Mixed race or Multiracial (NH)	x	x	1,187	370	533	x	x	1.91%	0.59%	0.85%
Hispanic or Latino (any race)	31,296	40,263	43,347	49,578	49,014	59.13%	67.60%	74.57%	79.32%	78.25%
Total	52,929	59,564	62,150	62,500	62,640	100.00%	100.00%	100.00%	100.00%	100.00%

=== 2020 census ===
As of the 2020 census, Montebello had a population of 62,640 and a population density of 7,521.6 people per square mile. The median age was 37.8 years; 21.3% of residents were under the age of 18 and 16.4% were 65 years of age or older. For every 100 females there were 92.8 males, and for every 100 females age 18 and over there were 89.9 males age 18 and over.

100.0% of residents lived in urban areas, while 0.0% lived in rural areas.

The racial makeup of Montebello was 13,346 (21.3%) White, 8,005 (12.8%) Asian, 614 (1.0%) Black or African American, 1,400 (2.2%) American Indian and Alaska Native, 82 (0.1%) Native Hawaiian and Other Pacific Islander, 26,259 (41.9%) some other race, and 12,934 (20.6%) from two or more races; 49,014 (78.2%) were Hispanic or Latino of any race.

Including all responses for people of two or more races, 25,562 (40.8%) were White alone or in combination with one or more other races, 8,597 (13.7%) were Asian alone or in combination with one or more other races, 1,015 (1.6%) were Black or African American alone or in combination, 2,421 (3.9%) were American Indian and Alaska Native alone or in combination, 214 (0.3%) were Native Hawaiian and other Pacific Islander alone or in combination, and 38,402 (61.3%) were some other race alone or in combination with one or more other races.

Of the 49,014 Hispanic or Latino residents, 8,886 (14.2% of the total population) were White alone, 142 (0.2%) were Black or African American alone, 1,294 (2.1%) were American Indian and Alaska Native alone, 212 (0.3%) were Asian alone, 16 (0.0%) were Native Hawaiian and Other Pacific Islander alone, 26,063 (41.6%) were some other race alone, and 12,401 (19.8%) were two or more races.

There were 19,761 households in Montebello, of which 37.3% had children under the age of 18 living in them. Of all households, 43.6% were married-couple households, 17.4% were households with a male householder and no spouse or partner present, and 31.5% were households with a female householder and no spouse or partner present. About 18.6% of all households were made up of individuals and 9.2% had someone living alone who was 65 years of age or older.

There were 20,308 housing units, of which 19,761 (97.3%) were occupied; 8,771 (44.4%) were owner-occupied and 10,990 (55.6%) were renter-occupied. Of all housing units, 2.7% were vacant. The homeowner vacancy rate was 0.4% and the rental vacancy rate was 2.5%. Of the vacant units, 281 (1.4% of total units) were for rent, 26 (0.1%) were rented but not occupied, 31 (0.2%) were for sale only, 20 (0.1%) were sold but not occupied, 12 (0.1%) were for seasonal, recreational, or occasional use, and 177 (0.9%) were otherwise vacant.

=== Income and poverty ===
The median household income between 2017 and 2022 was $72,317 (2022 dollars), with 13.0% of people living in poverty.

=== 2010 census ===
The 2010 United States census reported that Montebello had a population of 62,500. The population density was 7,464.7 inhabitants per square mile (2,882.1/km^{2}). The racial makeup of Montebello was 33,633 (53.8%) White, 567 (0.9%) African American, 634 (1.0%) Native American, 6,850 (11.0%) Asian, 58 (0.1%) Pacific Islander, 18,431 (29.5%) from other races, and 2,327 (3.7%) from two or more races. Hispanic or Latino of any race were 49,578 persons (79.3%). Non-Hispanic Whites were 8.5% of the population.

Ethnic Latinos, mostly Mexican-American, make up the predominant group of residents in the city. Montebello borders East Los Angeles, and is well known for its Mexican-American history and culture. Montebello also has a significant Armenian-American community. In the 2010 census, 38.3% of Montebello residents identified as foreign born, with 75.6% speaking a language other than English in the home. There is also a Japanese community in Montebello.

Armenian, Italian, German, Irish and Russian are the most common ancestries. Spanish and Chinese are the most common spoken non-English languages.

The census reported that 62,100 people (99.4% of the population) lived in households, 39 (0.1%) lived in non-institutionalized group quarters, and 361 (0.6%) were institutionalized.

There were 19,012 households, of which 8,168 (43.0%) had children under the age of 18 living in them, 9,088 (47.8%) were opposite-sex married couples living together, 4,031 (21.2%) had a female householder with no husband present, 1,651 (8.7%) had a male householder with no wife present. There were 1,302 (6.8%) unmarried opposite-sex partnerships, and 134 (0.7%) same-sex married couples or partnerships. 3,350 households (17.6%) were made up of individuals, and 1,640 (8.6%) had someone living alone who was 65 years of age or older. The average household size was 3.27. There were 14,770 families (77.7% of all households); the average family size was 3.67.

The population was spread out, with 16,142 people (25.8%) under the age of 18, 6,414 people (10.3%) aged 18 to 24, 17,567 people (28.1%) aged 25 to 44, 13,857 people (22.2%) aged 45 to 64, and 8,520 people (13.6%) who were 65 years of age or older. The median age was 34.7 years. For every 100 females, there were 93.3 males. For every 100 females age 18 and over, there were 89.5 males.

There were 19,768 housing units at an average density of 2,361.0 units per square mile (911.6 units/km^{2}), of which 8,766 (46.1%) were owner-occupied, and 10,246 (53.9%) were occupied by renters. The homeowner vacancy rate was 0.9%; the rental vacancy rate was 4.1%. 29,095 people (46.6% of the population) lived in owner-occupied housing units and 33,005 people (52.8%) lived in rental housing units.

According to the 2010 United States census, Montebello had a median household income of $47,488, with 15.4% of the population living below the federal poverty line.

=== Mapping L.A. ===
Mapping L.A. reported that in 2000, Mexican and Armenian were the most common ancestries in Montebello. Mexico and El Salvador were the most common foreign places of birth.

== Economy ==
=== Top employers ===
According to the city's 2009 Comprehensive Annual Financial Report, the top employers in the city are:

#	Employer	# of Employees
1	Kaiser Permanente	4,496
2	Montebello Unified School District	3,577
3	Monarch Litho	2,865
4	The Shops at Montebello	1,897
5	Beverly Hospital	860
6	Bimbo Bakeries USA	750
7	Minson	633
8	City of Montebello	601
9	Royal Paper Box	170

== Parks and recreation ==
Parks include:

- Grant Rea Park, which features Montebello Barnyard Zoo, pony rides, train rides and a miniature water park.
- Bicknell Park, which features the Armenian Genocide Martyrs Monument.
- Montebello City Park, the oldest park, which featured fishponds in the 1950s, and now includes a skateboard park.
- Sanchez Adobe Park, which includes Juan Matias Sanchez Adobe, built in 1845, the oldest extant structure in Montebello.
- Ashiya Park, named for Montebello's sister city in Japan.
- Henry Acuna Park, named for the only Montebello Police Department officer to die on duty. Memorials are located there.
- The 11 acres (4.5 ha) Reggie Rodriguez Park, which includes the Reggie Rodriguez Community Center, both named for a Vietnam War hero.
- Chet Holifield Park, which features the Chet Holifield Branch Library, both named for Congressman Chet Holifield.

=== Golf course ===
Montebello Municipal Golf Course, a 120-acre (49 ha), 18-hole course founded in 1928 as a private club, was purchased by the city in 1941, and features hotels and a conference center.

== Government ==
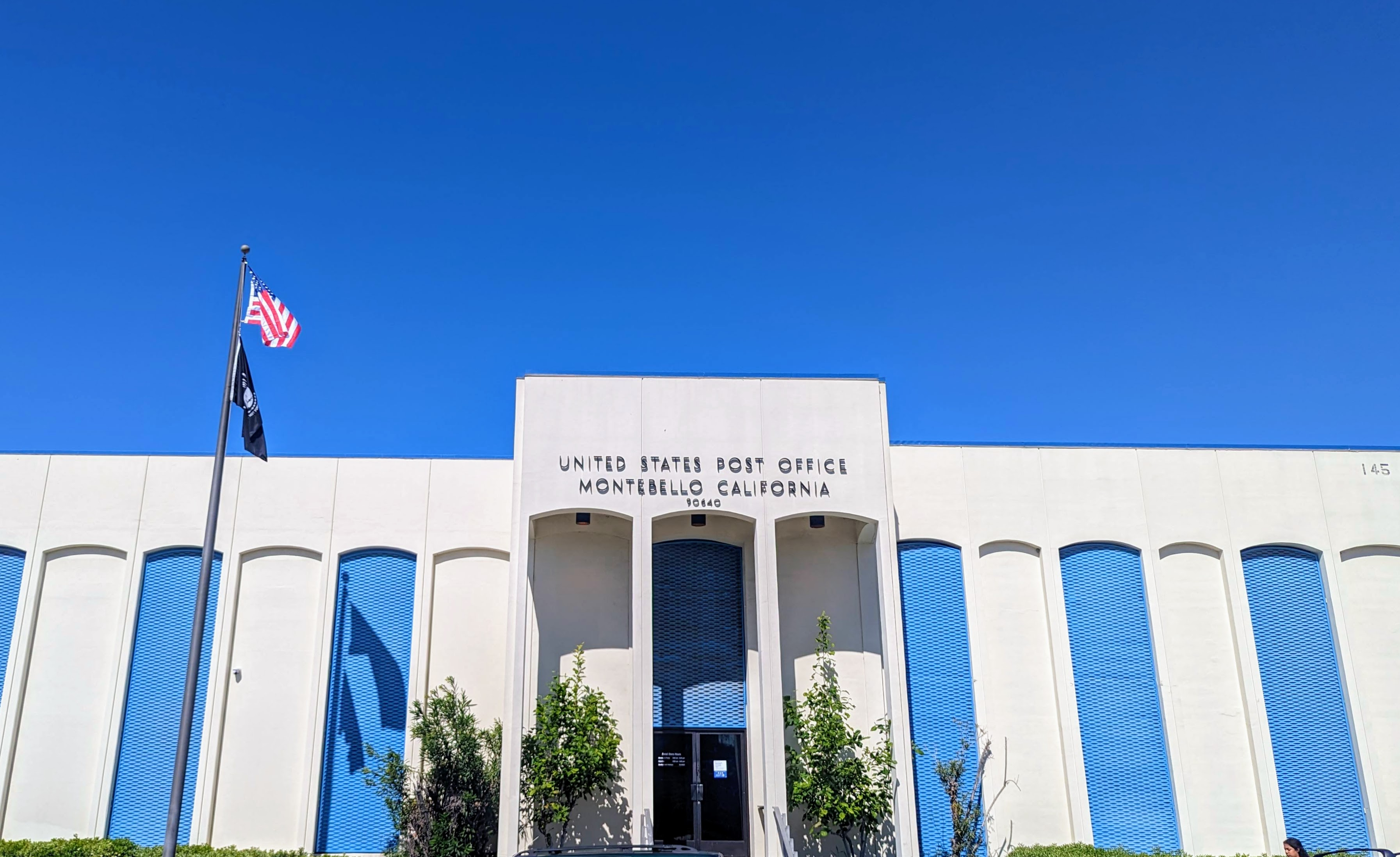
Post office in Montebello

In the California State Legislature, Montebello is in the 30th senatorial district, represented by Democrat Bob Archuleta, and in the 54th Assembly district, represented by Democrat Mark Gonzalez. In the United States House of Representatives, Montebello is in California's 38th congressional district, represented by Democrat Linda Sánchez.

Montebello utilizes a city council/city administrator form of government. The city council provides political leadership and policy direction. Montebello's current elected City Treasurer is Rafael Gutierrez. and the current elected City Clerk is Irma-Bernal Barajas. The city administrator works under the direction of the City Council, and functions as the manager of city employees and the department heads. Montebello has six department heads and some oversee more than one division. Previous Mayor Vanessa Delgado resigned in 2018 to serve on the California State Senate. The City Council is composed of five members elected at large by the citizens of Montebello to serve for four-year overlapping terms. Members include Salvador Melendez (Mayor), Georgina Tamayo (Mayor Pro Tem), Scarlet Peralta, Ric Alonzo, and Danielle Romero.

On January 24, 2024, Montebello became "at least" the fourth city in Southern California whose local governments passed a resolution calling for a ceasefire in Israel's war on Gaza; the city council passed the resolution unanimously.

== Education ==
=== Public ===
The city is served by the Montebello Unified School District. M.U.S.D. serves the city of Montebello, portions of the cities of Bell Gardens, Commerce, Downey, Rosemead, Pico Rivera, and Monterey Park, as well as the unincorporated community of South San Gabriel, and a part of the unincorporated community of East Los Angeles. The District is one of the largest and most diverse in Los Angeles County with an enrollment of more than 35,000 K–12 students and 30,000 adults enrolled in adult education.

There are eighteen elementary schools, six intermediate schools, five high schools, and four adult schools. The five high schools are: Montebello High School, founded in 1909; Bell Gardens High School; Schurr High School; Vail High School, an alternative high school for grades 10–12;

Applied Technology Center, a $30 million facility opened in the fall of 2011, is a vocational high school with state-of-the-art technical training capable of accommodating up to 750 students. Students wishing to attend ATC are required to apply for admission. Board of education President Edwin Chau stated that ATC offers students a "rigorous academic curriculum and career technical education within a full-day schedule." Montebello Unified, has made it their goal to ensure students graduate ready and college prepared." The project was paid for with a $98 million Measure M bond, which voters passed in November 2004.

=== Private ===
Saint Benedict School, a private parochial grammar school, K-8, is operated on Saint Benedict Church property. It opened in September 1941 and was formally dedicated on Pearl Harbor Day, December 7, 1941.

Our Lady of Miraculous Medal Parish School. The school first opened in 1954 through the leadership of the Daughters of Charity of St. Vincent De Paul.

A private parochial high school, Cantwell-Sacred Heart of Mary High School, is also located in Montebello. Originally two separate gender-segregated High Schools, they merged in the 1991, the Sacred Heart of Mary campus moving to the Cantwell campus.

St. John's Lutheran Church has a Kindergarten-8th school on a site adjoining the church.

== Infrastructure ==
=== Transportation ===
The city is easily accessible to the Long Beach- (I-710), San Gabriel River- (I-605), Pomona- (SR 60) and Santa Ana- (I-5) freeways.

==== Buses ====
Public transportation is provided by the city-owned Montebello Bus Lines; the service is the sixth largest public transit agency in Los Angeles County with an annual ridership of over 8.2 million. Starting in 1931 with a fleet of four buses, the agency now has a fleet of 66 buses, including five hybrid gasoline-electric buses and serves 14 communities.

==== Other public transportation ====
Montebello LINK is a transportation shuttle offering curb-to-curb service to and from the Montebello/Commerce station. Montebello also operates Montebello Dial-a-Taxi, a program offering transportation for senior residents and qualified disabled persons of any age. 15,000 residents utilize this service.

=== Law enforcement ===
Montebello has a police department consisting of 74 sworn officers, which includes the Chief of Police, two captains, five lieutenants, and ten sergeants. The department also employs 24 civilian personnel organized into three divisions: Field Services, Investigative Services, and Support Services. The Chief of Police is Paul Espinosa and is the eleventh police chief of the Montebello Police Department since 1920. Augmenting the department are a Reserve Officer Corps, a Police Explorer Program, a Police Chaplain Corps, and a civilian "Citizens on Patrol" program. The department provides a variety of services to citizens including Neighborhood Watch, the Citizen's Academy and a child seat loan program. The Crime prevention Bureau provides free security inspections to local businesses and residents.

=== Fire department ===
The Montebello Fire Department includes three fire stations, three paramedic engine companies, two paramedic rescue squads, one battalion chief unit, and one truck company.

=== Trees ===
The city maintains an estimated 20,000 city trees, and has received a "Tree City U.S.A." award since 1991.

== Notable people ==
- Alan Bannister, born in Montebello, was a Major League Baseball player
- Richard Cabral, American actor and writer known for his role on the anthology series American Crime (2015), and his recurring role on the Fox action comedy-drama TV series Lethal Weapon, based on the action film series of the same name
- Ken Davitian, actor, most notably played the role of Azamat in the movie "Borat"
- John DeCuir, Oscar-winning art director; Montebello High School Class of 1936; earned eleven Oscar nominations, winning three: The King and I, Cleopatra, and Hello, Dolly!
- Oscar De La Hoya, 10-time boxing world champion and Olympic gold medalist
- Rodney Eastman, actor, A Nightmare on Elm Street 3: Dream Warriors and A Nightmare on Elm Street 4: The Dream Master; graduate of Schurr High School Class of 1985
- Deborah Foreman, actress, star of film Valley Girl as Julie Richman; born in Montebello
- Darlene Hard, tennis player, two-time U.S. Nationals champion (1960, 1961), 1960 French champion, Fed Cup champ 1963; won 18 tennis titles in doubles and mixed doubles; born in Montebello and a 1953 graduate of Montebello High School
- Ed Hernandez, California state senator and former state assembly member
- Jay Hernandez, actor, has appeared in several major motion pictures, including playing the lead role in the 2005 horror film Hostel and Chato Santana / El Diablo in 2016's Suicide Squad
- Bobby Knoop, Major League Baseball player and coach, member Los Angeles Angels Hall of Fame; Montebello High School Class of 1956
- Mickey Klutts, Major League Baseball player, was born in Montebello
- Jack Larson, Actor, co-star in the Adventures of Superman (Jimmy Olsen), graduated from Montebello High School
- Judi Evans Luciano, actress, was born in Montebello, star on Days of Our Lives
- Robert Bruce Merrifield, Montebello High School class of 1939, Nobel Prize winner
- Max Montoya, born in Montebello, NFL player, four-time Pro Bowl selection
- Sergio Mora, professional boxer; Schurr High School class of 1997
- Sona Movsesian, born in Montebello, New York Times Best Selling author, podcast host, media personality, and Conan O'Brien's executive assistant
- Mirai Nagasu, born in Montebello, professional figure skater, national champion and Olympian
- Edward James Olmos, actor and director; Montebello High School Class of 1964
- Ramona Pagel, athlete, held U.S. record in shot put, Pan-American Games gold medalist; Schurr High School
- Joshua Pérez, born in Montebello, professional soccer player
- Jeffrey Lee Pierce, born in Montebello, singer, songwriter, guitarist and author. Founding member and frontman of The Gun Club.
- Jerry Pimm, college basketball coach, Montebello High School Class of 1956
- Carl Renezeder, off-road racing champion
- Jack Russell, born in Montebello, lead vocalist for Great White
- Mark Salas, born in Montebello, former MLB player.
- Hagop Sandaldjian, microminiature sculptor, lived and worked in Montebello after emigrating from Yerevan, Armenia (then part of the Soviet Union) in 1980.
- Catherine Sandoval, first Latina Rhodes Scholar, professor of law, California Public Utilities Commissioner
- Tom Tellez, track star and coach; Montebello High School Class of 1951, Tom Tellez Track at Carl Lewis International Complex
- Nosaj Thing, hip-hop recording artist, is a native of Montebello
- Art Torres, politician, Montebello High School Class of 1964
- Michael Trevino, born in Montebello; actor, best known for his role in "The Vampire Diaries" as Tyler Lockwood
- Eduardo Xol, television personality; graduate of Schurr High School Class of 1984

== Sister cities ==
Montebello has been affiliated with Ashiya, Hyōgo, Japan since the inception of the Sister City Program in 1961. Student Ambassadors are chosen to travel to Ashiya every year.

Montebello has been affiliated with Stepanakert, Nagorno-Karabakh Republic, since 2005, when a controversial move to facilitate the sister city relationship was made by the Armenian National Committee of the San Gabriel Valley and was approved by City Council.

Montebello is a sister city with Esquinapa, Mexico, Iguala, Mexico and Ensenada, Mexico.

== See also ==
- List of cities in Los Angeles County, California
- List of municipalities in California
