= Montebello High School =

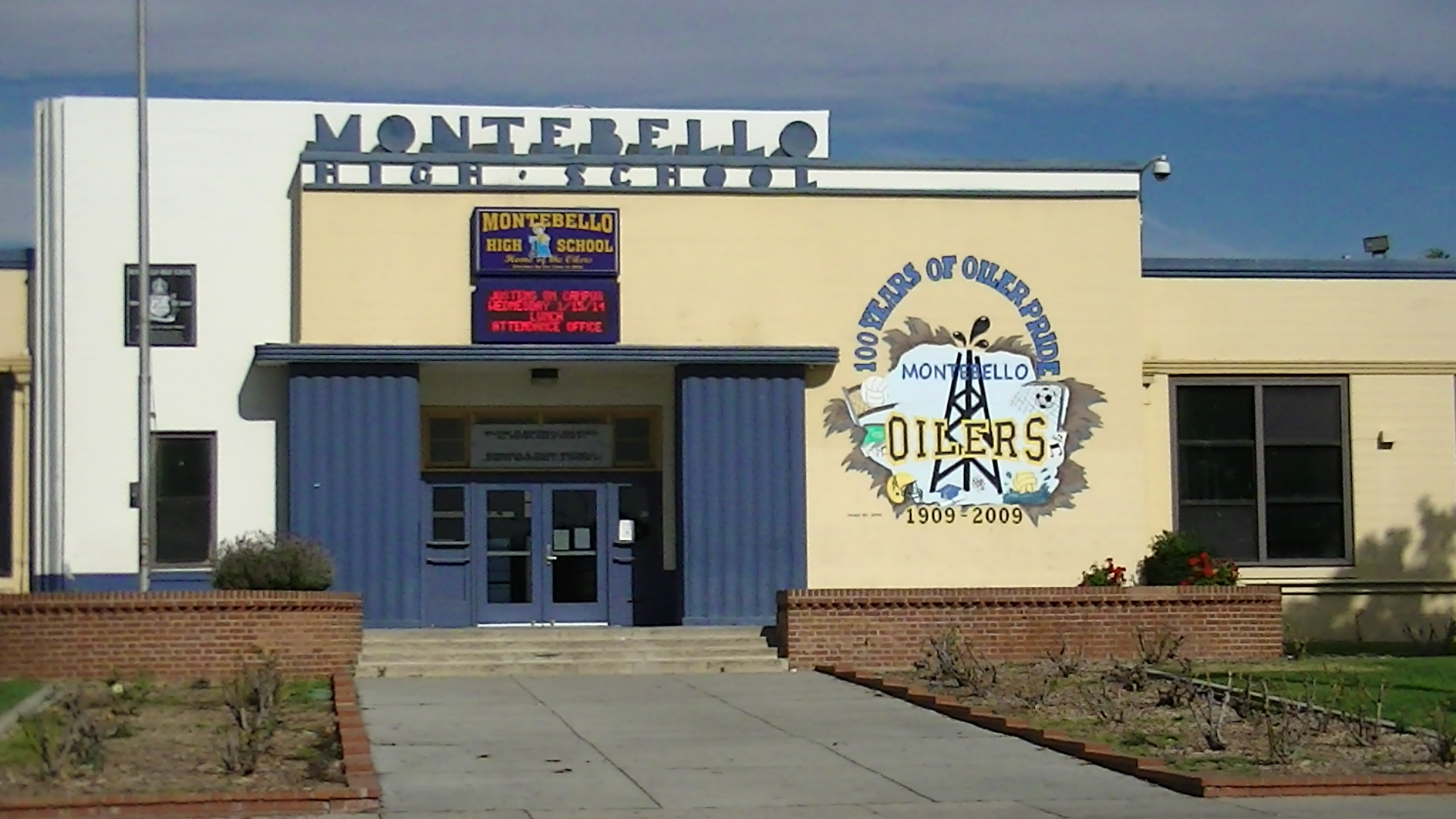

Location
- 2100 West Cleveland Avenue; Montebello, California 90640; United States; 34°00′56″N 118°07′21″W

Information
- Type: Public
- Established: 1909
- School district: Montebello Unified School District
- Principal: Constantino Duarte
- Teaching staff: 101.85 (FTE)
- Grades: 9-12
- Enrollment: 2,007 (2023–2024)
- Student to teacher ratio: 19.71
- Campus: Suburban
- Colors: Blue & Gold
- Athletics conference: CIF Southern Section; Almont League
- Mascot: Ollie the Oiler
- Nickname: Oilers
- Rival: Schurr High School
- Newspaper: OilerTV
- Yearbook: Golden Key
- Website: mhs.montebello.k12.ca.us

Montebello High School is a public high school which is part of the Montebello Unified School District. Founded in 1909, it has an enrollment of approximately 2,600 students in grades 9-12. Its campus is located in Montebello, California, a suburb of Los Angeles. It is named for the city of Montebello.

== Overview ==
The Montebello High School mascot is known as Ollie the Oiler, and the school's students and alumni are referred to as Oilers, (a reference to when Montebello was an oil-drilling town during the 1920s and 1930s).

== Demographics ==
The demographic breakdown of the 3,191 students enrolled for the 2012-2013 school year was:

- Male - 50.7%
- Female - 49.3%
- Native American/Alaskan - 0.1%
- Asian/Pacific islander - 0.9%
- Black - 0.3%
- Hispanic - 96.1%
- White - 2.4%
- Multiracial - 0.2%

Additionally, 86.3% of the students were eligible for free or reduced lunch.

== Extracurricular activities ==
=== Athletics ===
The varsity sports teams are referred to as the "Montebello Oilers." The school colors are blue and gold. The school has an athletic rivalry with nearby Schurr High School.

Sports offered at MHS:

==== Fall sports ====
- Boys Water Polo
- Competitive Cheer
- Cross Country
- Football
- Girls Tennis
- Girls Volleyball
- Girls Golf

==== Winter sports ====
- Boys Basketball
- Boys Soccer
- Coed Wrestling
- Competitive Cheer
- Girls Basketball
- Girls Soccer
- Girls Water Polo

==== Spring sports ====
- Baseball
- Boys Tennis
- Boys Volleyball
- Competitive Cheer
- Golf
- Softball
- Swimming
- Track and Field
- Ice hockey

== Notable alumni ==
=== Government and politics ===
- David L. Snowden, 1961: Police Chief of City of Beverly Hills, California (2004-2015)
- Art Torres, 1964: former United States Democratic Party state senator

=== Arts, sciences, and education ===
- John DeCuir, 1936: art director and production designer
- Robert Bruce Merrifield, 1939: biochemist who won the Nobel Prize in Chemistry in 1984 for the invention of solid phase Peptide synthesis

=== Sports and entertainment ===
- Jack Kramer, 1939: tennis player in International Tennis Hall of Fame
- Tom Tellez, 1951: former track coach at the University of Houston
- Darlene Hard, 1954: tennis player in International Tennis Hall of Fame
- Ivan Guevara, 1955: former college basketball coach at Whittier College and San Jose State University
- Barney Rosenzweig, 1955: television producer
- Jerry Pimm, 1956: former basketball coach at University of Utah
- Bobby Knoop, 1956: retired MLB second baseman for California Angels, Chicago White Sox, and Kansas City Royals
- Edward James Olmos, 1964: actor and director
- John Madrid, 1966: jazz and pop music trumpeter
